= 13th Nagaland Assembly =

Legislative assembly elections in India

Legislative Assembly of Nagaland
- 13th Nagaland Assembly

Type
- Type: Unicameral
- Term limits: 5 years

History
- Succeeded by: 14th Nagaland Assembly

Leadership
- Speaker: Sharingain Longkümer, NDPP since 7 February 2020
- Deputy Speaker: T. Yangseo Sangtam since 19 March 2022
- Leader of the House (Chief Minister): Neiphiu Rio, NDPP since 8 March 2018
- Deputy Chief Minister: Yanthungo Patton, BJP since 8 March 2018
- Leader of the Opposition: Vacant

Structure
- Seats: 60
- Political groups: Government (53); UDA (53): NDPP (35); BJP (13); NPF (4); IND (1); Vacant (7): Vacant (7)

Elections
- Voting system: First past the post
- Last election: 27 February 2018
- Next election: 27 February 2023

Meeting place
- Nagaland Legislative Assembly, Kohima, Nagaland, India-797001.

Website
- Nagaland Legislative Assembly

The Thirteenth Legislative Assembly of Nagaland was constituted after the 2018 Nagaland Legislative Assembly election. The election was held on 27 February 2018 in 59 out of 60 constituencies for the legislative assembly. The scheduled election in Northern Angami II constituency did not take place as the incumbent MLA Neiphiu Rio was declared elected unopposed.

== Notable members ==
| S.No | Position | Portrait | Name | Party | Constituency | Office Taken |
|---|---|---|---|---|---|---|
| 01 | Speaker | | Sharingain Longkümer | Nationalist Democratic Progressive Party | Aonglenden | 7 February 2020 |
| 02 | Deputy Speaker | | T. Yangseo Sangtam | Independent | Pungro–Kiphire | 19 March 2022 |
| 03 | Leader of the House | | Neiphiu Rio | Nationalist Democratic Progressive Party | Northern Angami II | 8 March 2018 |
| 05 | Deputy Leader of the House | | Yanthungo Patton | Bharatiya Janata Party | Tyüi | 8 March 2018 |
| 06 | Leader of Opposition | Vacant | | | | |

== Members of Legislative Assembly ==
The following are the Members of the Nagaland Legislative Assembly:

| No. | Constituency | Name | Party | Remarks |
|---|---|---|---|---|
Dimapur District
| 1 | Dimapur I | H. Tovihoto Ayemi | Bharatiya Janata Party | |
| 2 | Dimapur II | Moatoshi Longkümer | Nationalist Democratic Progressive Party | Switched from NPF to NDPP |
Chümoukedima District
| 3 | Dimapur III | Azheto Zhimomi | Nationalist Democratic Progressive Party | Switched from NPF to NDPP |
Chümoukedima District & Niuland District
| 4 | Ghaspani I | N. Jacob Zhimomi | Bharatiya Janata Party | |
Chümoukedima District
| 5 | Ghaspani II | Zhaleo Rio | Nationalist Democratic Progressive Party | |
Peren District
| 6 | Tening | Namri Nchang | Nationalist Democratic Progressive Party | |
| 7 | Peren | T. R. Zeliang | Nationalist Democratic Progressive Party | Switched from NPF to NDPP |
Kohima District
| 8 | Western Angami | Keneizhakho Nakhro | Nationalist Democratic Progressive Party | Switched from NPF to NDPP |
| 9 | Kohima Town | Neikiesalie Nicky Kire | Nationalist Democratic Progressive Party | |
| 10 | Northern Angami I | Khriehu Liezietsu | Naga People's Front | |
| 11 | Northern Angami II | Neiphiu Rio | Nationalist Democratic Progressive Party | |
Tseminyü District
| 12 | Tseminyü | R. Khing | Nationalist Democratic Progressive Party | |
Zünheboto District
| 13 | Pughoboto | Y. Vikheho Swü | Nationalist Democratic Progressive Party | Switched from NPF to NDPP |
Kohima District
| 14 | Southern Angami I | Medo Yhokha | Nationalist Democratic Progressive Party | Won in 2021 bypoll necessitated after the death of Vikho-o Yhoshü |
| 15 | Southern Angami II | Zale Neikha | Nationalist Democratic Progressive Party | |
Phek District
| 16 | Pfütsero | Neiba Kronu | Nationalist Democratic Progressive Party | |
| 17 | Chizami | Kezhienyi Khalo | Naga People's Front | |
| 18 | Chozuba | Chotisüh Sazo | Nationalist Democratic Progressive Party | Switched from NPF to NDPP |
| 19 | Phek | Kuzholuzo Nienu | Naga People's Front | |
| 20 | Meluri | Yitachu | Nationalist Democratic Progressive Party | Switched from NPF to NDPP |
Mokokchung District
| 21 | Tuli | Vacant | | Amenba Yaden switched from NPF to NDPP in April 2022, and resigned in February 2023. |
| 22 | Arkakong | Imnatiba Jamir | Nationalist Democratic Progressive Party | Switched from NPP to NDPP |
| 23 | Impur | Vacant | | Imtiwapang Aier switched from NPF to NDPP in April 2022, died on 7 January 2023. |
| 24 | Angetyongpang | Tongpang Ozüküm | Independent politician | |
| 25 | Mongoya | Ngangshi K. Ao | Naga People's Front | |
| 26 | Aonglenden | Sharingain Longkümer | Nationalist Democratic Progressive Party | |
| 27 | Mokokchung Town | Metsübo Jamir | Nationalist Democratic Progressive Party | |
| 28 | Koridang | Vacant | | Imkong L Imchen switched from NPF to NDPP in April 2022, and resigned in January 2023. |
| 29 | Jangpetkong | Longrineken | Bharatiya Janata Party | |
| 30 | Alongtaki | Temjen Imna Along | Bharatiya Janata Party | |
Zünheboto District
| 31 | Akuluto | Kazheto Kinimi | Bharatiya Janata Party | |
| 32 | Atoizu | Vacant | | Picto Shohe switched from NPF to NDPP in April 2022, and resigned in February 2023. |
| 33 | Suruhoto | H. Khehovi | Bharatiya Janata Party | |
| 34 | Aghunato | Pukhayi | Nationalist Democratic Progressive Party | |
| 35 | Zünheboto | K. Tokugha Sukhalu | Nationalist Democratic Progressive Party | |
| 36 | Satakha | G. Kaito Aye | Nationalist Democratic Progressive Party | Switched From JD(U) to NDPP |
Wokha District
| 37 | Tyüi | Yanthungo Patton | Bharatiya Janata Party | |
| 38 | Wokha | Chümben Mürry | Nationalist Democratic Progressive Party | Switched from NPF to NDPP |
| 39 | Sanis | Mhathung Yanthan | Nationalist Democratic Progressive Party | |
| 40 | Bhandari | Mmhonlümo Kikon | Bharatiya Janata Party | |
Mon District
| 41 | Tizit | P. Paiwang Konyak | Bharatiya Janata Party | |
| 42 | Wakching | Y. M. Yollow | Nationalist Democratic Progressive Party | Switched from NPF to NDPP |
| 43 | Tapi | Noke Wangnao | Nationalist Democratic Progressive Party | |
| 44 | Phomching | Pohwang Konyak | Nationalist Democratic Progressive Party | |
| 45 | Tehok | C. L. John | Nationalist Democratic Progressive Party | Switched from NPF to NDPP |
| 46 | Mon Town | Vacant | | N. Thongwang Konyak switched from NPF to NDPP in April 2022, and resigned in January 2023. |
| 47 | Aboi | Eshak Konyak | Nationalist Democratic Progressive Party | Switched from NPF to NDPP |
| 48 | Moka | E. E. Pangteang | Nationalist Democratic Progressive Party | Switched from NPF to NDPP |
Longleng District
| 49 | Tamlu | B. S. Nganlang | Nationalist Democratic Progressive Party | Switched from NPF to NDPP |
| 50 | Longleng | S. Pangnyu Phom | Bharatiya Janata Party | |
Tuensang District
| 51 | Noksen | H. Chuba Chang | Bharatiya Janata Party | Won in 2021 bypoll necessitated after the death of C. M. Chang |
| 52 | Longkhim–Chare | Muthingnyuba Sangtam | Nationalist Democratic Progressive Party | Switched from NPF to NDPP |
| 53 | Tuensang Sadar I | Toyang Chang | Nationalist Democratic Progressive Party | Switched from NPF to NDPP |
| 54 | Tuensang Sadar II | Kejong Chang | Nationalist Democratic Progressive Party | Switched from NPF to NDPP |
Mon District
| 55 | Tobu | N. Bongkhao Konyak | Nationalist Democratic Progressive Party | |
Noklak District
| 56 | Noklak | H. Haiying | Bharatiya Janata Party | |
| 57 | Thonoknyu | Vacant | | L. Khumo Khiamniungan switched From NPP to NDPP in April 2022, and resigned in February 2023. |
Shamator District
| 58 | Shamator–Chessore | Keoshu Yimchunger | Nationalist Democratic Progressive Party | Won in 2021 bypoll necessitated after the death of Toshi Wungtung |
Kiphire District
| 59 | Seyochung–Sitimi | V. Kashiho Sangtam | Bharatiya Janata Party | |
| 60 | Pungro–Kiphire | Vacant | | T. Yangseo Sangtam won in 2021 bypoll necessitated after the death of T. Torechu, and resigned in January 2023. |

== See also ==
- Nagaland Legislative Assembly
- 2018 Nagaland Legislative Assembly Election
- Northeast India
- List of constituencies of the Nagaland Legislative Assembly
