= 2023 Nagaland Legislative Assembly election =

Assembly elections in Indian state of Nagaland

- 27 February 2023

59 out of 60 seats (1 won unopposed) in the Nagaland Legislative Assembly 31 seats needed for a majority
- Turnout: 86.72% (▲1.10 pp)
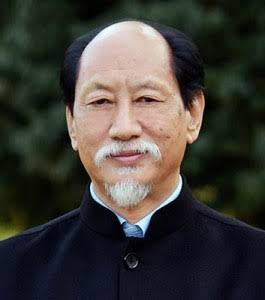

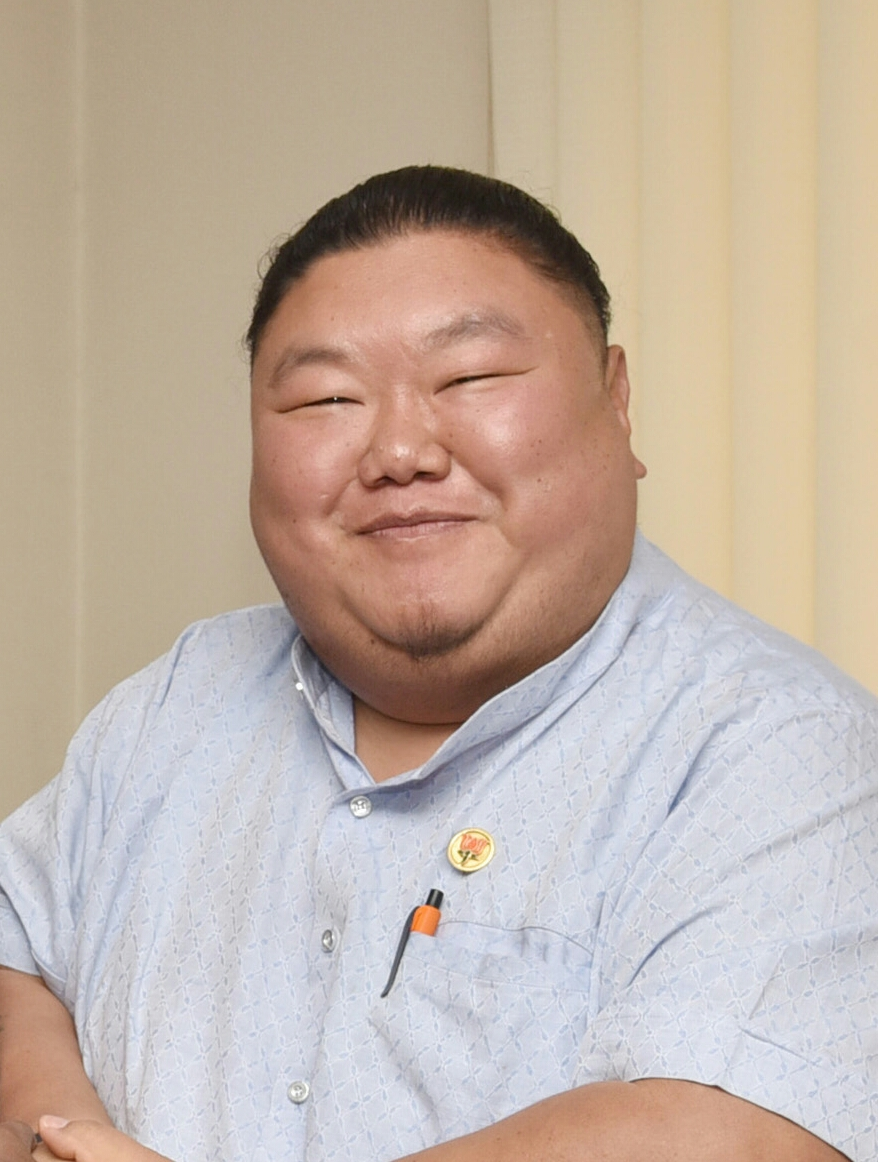

	Majority party	Minority party	Third party
Leader	Neiphiu Rio	Temjen Imna Along	Vanthungo Odyuo
Party	NPF	BJP	NCP
Alliance	NDA	NDA
Leader since	2017	2023	2023
Leader's seat	Northern Angami II	Alongtaki	Did not contest
Last election	25.2%, 18 seats	15.3%, 12 seats	1.06%, 0 seats
Seats won	27	12	7
Seat change	▲9	Steady	▲7
Popular vote	369,143	215,292	109,467
Percentage	32.22%	18.81%	9.56%
Swing	▲7.00 pp	▲3.51 pp	▲8.50 pp
	Fourth party	Fifth party
		LJP(RV)
Leader	Andrew Ahoto	Richard Humtsoe
Party	NPP	LJP(RV)
Leader since	2023	2023
Leader's seat	Did not contest	Did not contest
Last election	7.12%, 2 seats	New Party
Seats won	5	2
Seat change	▲3	New party
Popular vote	65,920	98,972
Percentage	5.78%	8.65%
Swing	▼1.34 pp	New party

- Structure of the Nagaland Legislative Assembly after the election
Chief Minister before election
Neiphiu Rio
NDPP
Chief Minister after election
Neiphiu Rio
Naga People Front

Legislative Assembly elections were held in Nagaland on 27 February 2023 to elect all 60 members of the Nagaland Legislative Assembly. The votes were counted and the results were declared on 2 March 2023.

The election marked a historic moment as it saw the first-ever election of two female MLAs to the Nagaland Assembly.

== Background ==
The previous assembly elections were held in February 2018. After the election, coalition of Nationalist Democratic Progressive Party (NDPP) and Bharatiya Janata Party (BJP) formed the state government, with Neiphiu Rio becoming Chief Minister. BJP severed ties with its local ally, Naga People's Front (NPF) to form the government despite the latter emerging as the single largest party. The tenure of 13th Nagaland Assembly ended on 12 March 2023.

=== Defections ===
In April 2022, 21 NPF MLAs joined NDPP along with then leader of the opposition T. R. Zeliang reducing the former's strength to four. In November 2022, BJP Nagaland District Presidents of Kohima, Wokha and Peren joined JD(U) as a major jolt to BJP Nagaland.

== Schedule ==
The election schedule was announced by the Election Commission of India on 18 January 2023.

Poll event	Schedule
Notification date	31 January 2023
Last date for filing nomination	7 February 2023
Scrutiny of nomination	8 February 2023
Last date for withdrawal of nomination	10 February 2023
Date of poll	27 February 2023
Date of Counting of Votes	2 March 2023

== Parties and alliances ==
=== National Democratic Alliance ===
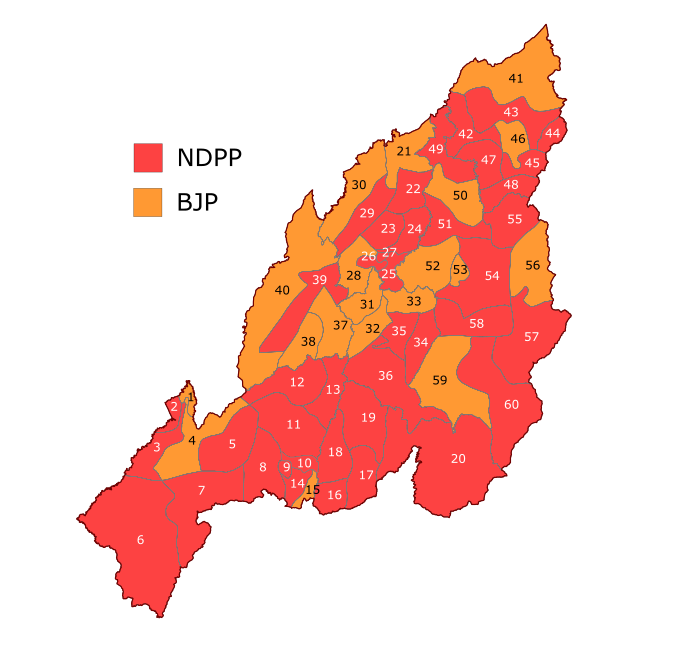
Map of the seat sharing arrangement between the NEDA

BJP and NPF announced their alliance for the election in July 2022 and the seat sharing formula was declared on 2 February 2023. Both BJP and NPF announced their candidates on the same day.

Party	Flag	Symbol	Leader	Seats contested
Naga People Front			Neiphiu Rio	40
Bharatiya Janata Party			Yanthungo Patton	20
Total				60

=== Indian National Congress ===
The Indian National Congress did not win any seat in the previous elections in 2018. On 26 December 2023, INC appointed Rajya Sabha MP Mukul Wasnik as the senior observer and along with former Goa Chief Minister Francisco Sardinha and K. Jeyakumar, both Lok Sabha MPs, as observers for the Nagaland polls. In December 2022, the Nagaland Pradesh Congress Committee (NPCC) President Kewekhape Therie invited like-minded parties and leaders to join an alliance to form a secular front. It depended on the strong anti-Hindutva stand in the Christian-majority state as well as the delay in resolving the Indo-Naga conflict. In their bid to regain lost ground, INC had been in conversation with church bodies as well as Naga National Political Groups (NNPGs).

Party	Flag	Symbol	Leader	Seats contested
Indian National Congress			Kewekhape Therie	23

=== Others ===
In a press release issued on 22 January 2023, Janata Dal (United) declared that it will not participate in any pre-poll, seat-sharing alliance with any political party. However, it would be open to post-poll alliance with like-minded parties. JD(U) was one of the first political parties to announce their candidates for the elections on 29 January 2022.

LJP(RV) decided to contest election not with any other party however party has decided not contest against BJP candidates.

Party	Flag	Symbol	Leader	Seats contested
Lok Janshakti Party (Ram Vilas)			Richard Humtsoe	16
Nationalist Congress Party			Vanthungo Odyuo	12
National People's Party			Andrew Ahoto	12
Republican Party of India (Athawale)			Mughato Ayemi	8
Janata Dal (United)			Senchumo (NSN) Lotha	7
Rashtriya Janata Dal			Nikheje Sumi	3
Communist Party of India			M. M. Throma Konyak	1
Rising People's Party			Joel Naga	1

== Candidates ==
For the 60 seats in the Nagaland Legislative Assembly, a total of 184 candidates submitted their nominations. At least 21 constituencies witnessed a three-way contest. Four women candidates were also fielded by various parties.

Based on their affidavits submitted to the Election Commission of India, The Morung Express, a leading newspaper in Nagaland, revealed that 104 candidates were crorepati (net assets over ₹10 million). The huge income and asset disparity between the candidates showed that the richest candidate was worth ₹137 crore (Sukhato A. Sema), and the poorest had just ₹5251 (T. Ngampai Konyak). While 16 of the 20 BJP candidates were crorepati, 34 from the NDPP were in the bracket.

District	Constituency		NEDA		NPF		INC	
District	No.	Name	Party	Candidate	Party	Candidate	Party	Candidate
Dimapur	1	Dimapur I	BJP	H. Tovihoto Ayemi			INC	Kewekhape Therie
Dimapur	2	Dimapur II (ST)	NDPP	Moatoshi Longkumer			INC	S. Amento Chishi
Chümoukedima	3	Dimapur III (ST)	NDPP	Hekani Jakhalu Kense			INC	V. Lasuh
Chümoukedima and Niuland	4	Ghaspani I (ST)	BJP	Jacob Zhimomi	NPF	Vikato S. Aye	INC	Akavi N. Zhimomi
Chümoukedima	5	Ghaspani II (ST)	NDPP	Zhaleo Rio				
Peren	6	Tening (ST)	NDPP	Tarie Zeliang	NPF	Henry Zeliang	INC	Rosy Thomson
Peren	7	Peren (ST)	NDPP	T.R. Zeliang	NPF	Kingudi Joseph		
Kohima	8	Western Angami (ST)	NDPP	Salhoutuonuo Kruse				
Kohima	9	Kohima Town (ST)	NDPP	Neikiesalie (Nicky) Kire			INC	Meshenlo Kath
Kohima	10	Northern Angami I (ST)	NDPP	Kekhrielhoulie Yhome	NPF	Khriehu Liezietsu		
Kohima	11	Northern Angami II (ST)	NDPP	Neiphiu Rio			INC	Seyievilie Sachü
Tseminyü	12	Tseminyü (ST)	NDPP	R. Khing				
Zünheboto	13	Pughoboto (ST)	NDPP	Vikheho Swu				
Kohima	14	Southern Angami I (ST)	NDPP	Medo Yhokha				
Kohima	15	Southern Angami II (ST)	BJP	Kropol Vitsü				
Phek	16	Pfütsero (ST)	NDPP	Neiba Kronu	NPF	Vivolie Kezo		
Phek	17	Chizami (ST)	NDPP	K. G. Kenye	NPF	Kezhienyi Khalo		
Phek	18	Chozuba (ST)	NDPP	Küdecho Khamo	NPF	Sovenyi		
Phek	19	Phek (ST)	NDPP	Kupota Khesoh	NPF	Kuzholuzo Nienu	INC	Zachilhu Ringa Vadeo
Phek	20	Meluri (ST)	NDPP	Z. Nyusietho Nyuthe	NPF	S. Akho Leyri		
Mokokchung	21	Tuli (ST)	BJP	Panjung Jamir				
Mokokchung	22	Arkakong (ST)	NDPP	Imnatiba				
Mokokchung	23	Impur (ST)	NDPP	T.N. Manen			INC	Bendangkokba
Mokokchung	24	Angetyongpang (ST)	NDPP	Tongpang Ozukum				
Mokokchung	25	Mongoya (ST)	NDPP	Imkongmar	NPF	Moasangba Jamir	INC	S. Supongmeren Jamir
Mokokchung	26	Aonglenden (ST)	NDPP	Sharingain Longkumer			INC	Toshipokba
Mokokchung	27	Mokokchung Town (ST)	NDPP	Metsubo Jamir			INC	Alem Jongshi
Mokokchung	28	Koridang (ST)	BJP	Imkong L Imchen	NPF	Major Toshikaba		
Mokokchung	29	Jangpetkong (ST)	NDPP	Temjenmenba	NPF	Imjongwati Longkumer		
Mokokchung	30	Alongtaki (ST)	BJP	Temjen Imna Along				
Zünheboto	31	Akuluto (ST)	BJP	Kazheto Kinimi				
Zünheboto	32	Atoizu (ST)	BJP	Kahuli Sema				
Zünheboto	33	Suruhoto (ST)	BJP	H. Khehovi				
Zünheboto	34	Aghunato (ST)	NDPP	Ikuto Zhimomi				
Zünheboto	35	Zünheboto (ST)	NDPP	K. T. Sukhalu	NPF	Akavi Sümi		
Zünheboto	36	Satakha (ST)	NDPP	G. Kaito Aye				
Wokha	37	Tyüi (ST)	BJP	Yanthungo Patton				
Wokha	38	Wokha (ST)	BJP	Renbonthung Ezung			INC	N. Wobenthung Lotha
Wokha	39	Sanis (ST)	NDPP	Mhathung Yanthan	NPF	Roland Lotha	INC	Yanchamo Ovung
Wokha	40	Bhandari (ST)	BJP	Mmhonlümo Kikon	NPF	Achumbemo Kikon	INC	Chenithung Humtsoe
Mon	41	Tizit (ST)	BJP	P. Paiwang Konyak	NPF	Tahwang Angh	INC	T. Thomas Konyak
Mon	42	Wakching (ST)	NDPP	W. Chingang Konyak				
Mon	43	Tapi (ST)	NDPP	Noke Wangnao	NPF	Wanglem Konyak		
Mon	44	Phomching (ST)	BJP	Konngam Konyak	NPF	Chingsak Konyak	INC	T. Ngampai Konyak
Mon	45	Tehok (ST)	NDPP	C. L. John	NPF	C. Kawang Konyak	INC	Shaboh Konyak
Mon	46	Mon Town (ST)	BJP	Cheong Konyak				
Mon	47	Aboi (ST)	NDPP	Eshak Konyak				
Mon	48	Moka (ST)	NDPP	E. E. Pangteang	NPF	D. Yongnyak Konyak		
Longleng	49	Tamlu (ST)	NDPP	B. S. Nganlang Phom				
Longleng	50	Longleng (ST)	BJP	S. Pangnyu Phom			INC	Denngan Y. Avennoho
Tuensang	51	Noksen (ST)	NDPP	H. Chuba Chang				
Tuensang	52	Longkhim–Chare (ST)	BJP	Sethrongkyu Sangtam				
Tuensang	53	Tuensang Sadar I (ST)	BJP	Bashanmongba Chang				
Tuensang	54	Tuensang Sadar II (ST)	NDPP	K. Odibendang Chang	NPF	H. Zungkum Chang	INC	Z. Throngso Yimkhiung
Mon	55	Tobu (ST)	NDPP	N. Bongkhao Konyak				
Noklak	56	Noklak (ST)	BJP	H. Haiying				
Noklak	57	Thonoknyu (ST)	NDPP	S. Heno Khiamniungan				
Shamator	58	Shamator–Chessore (ST)	NDPP	Keoshu Yimchunger	NPF	H. Mukam	INC	W. Akum Yimkhiung
Kiphire	59	Seyochung–Sitimi (ST)	BJP	V. Kashiho Sangtam			INC	S. Khaseo Sangtam
Kiphire	60	Pungro–Kiphire (ST)	NDPP	S. Kiusumew Yimchunger			INC	T. Atsubha Yimkhiung

== Issues ==
- Eastern Nagaland People's Organisation (ENPO) demanded separate state or union territory for Frontier Nagaland (or Eastern Nagaland or formerly called as Tuensang Division). The ENPO called for a boycott of the state assembly election.
- Janata Dal (United) has raised the issue of unemployment, stating that 90,000 educated youths in Nagaland are still unemployed.
- The separatist movement in Nagaland which has started since India got its independence.
- The demand for the removal of the Centre-enforced Armed Forces (Special Powers) Act of 1958 by many Naga Organizations.
- Various organisations have demanded for the imposition of the Inner Line Permit (ILP) system in the state to regulate entry of outsiders into the state, and for employment throughout the state and inter-state.

== Campaigns ==
=== Clean Election ===
The Nagaland Baptist Church Council (NBCC) continues its Clean Election Movement (CEM) with this state elections. NBCC first conceived the campaign in 1973 in time for the 1974 Nagaland Legislative Assembly election. Its aim was to prevent people from selling their votes or accepting bribe. Ever since, the campaign has gained momentum into a church-facilitated movement. However, NBCC leaders acknowledge that there has not been 'elaborate visible progress, but it is gaining ground slowly.' For the 2023 state elections, NBCC launched the campaign through its 20 affiliated and 4 associate church associations mid-2021. This year, CEM is part of the church's celebrations of 150 years of Christianity in Nagaland. The Chakhesang Clean Election Movement launched by the tribe's Baptist church council went further to declare that church workers who wish to involve in the election campaign must resign first and abstain from church-related ministry for a period of five years.

In October 2022, CEM issued a statement registering their protest over the declaration of a consensus candidate from Chungtia village in Mokokchung district accompanied with punitive and dismissive repercussions. They were clear that a consensus candidate through the diktat of the village council is an electoral malpractice and against the Election Code of Conduct. CEM also condemned possible declarations by other village councils or groups and called the church to be more vigilant against these practices. However, the condemnation came in rather late as the consensus candidate (B Toshikaba Longchar) was declared by the Chungtia Senso Mungdang (Chungtia Citizens Forum) on 28 December 2021 followed by the notification from the Chungtia Village Council (CVC) warning the villagers of a penalty of seven pigs for not following the diktat. A Writ petition filed at the Kohima Bench of the Gauhati High Court challenging the village resolution was first listed for hearing on 27 October 2022. T. Chalukumba Ao, a resident of the village, had approached the court challenging the resolution and consequential notice. Similarly, the Bench has admitted the case against the consensus candidate flouted by the Mongsenyimti Riongsanger Putu Menden (Mongsenyimti Riongsanger Village Council) and their resolutions in December 2021, June 2022, and October 2022. Consequent to the case regarding the village's consensus candidate, the Chungtia Senso Mungdang withdrew its resolution and the Chungtia Village Council withdrew its penalty of seven pigs on detractors.

== Surveys & polls ==
=== Exit polls ===
Election Commission of India had banned exit polls for the period between 7am on 16 February and 7pm on 27 February 2023. Accordingly, the exit polls were published in the evening of 27 February 2023.

Polling agency					Lead
Polling agency	NEDA	NPF	INC	Others	Lead
India Today-Axis My India	38-48	3-8	1-2	5-15	35-40
Zee News-Matrize	35-43	2-5	1-3	6-12	33-38
Times Now-ETG	39-49	4-8	0	6-17	35-41
India News-Jan Ki Baat	35-45	6-10	0	9-15	29-35
Poll of Polls (Average)	42	6	1	11	36
Actual Result	37	2	0	21	14

== Results ==
The election marked a historic moment as it saw the first-ever election of two female MLAs to the Nagaland Assembly. The sitting MLA for Akuluto constituency, Kazheto Kinimi, was elected unopposed after his opponent from the Indian National Congress, N. Khekashe Sumi, withdrew his nomination.

=== Results by alliance and party ===
Results
Alliance	Party	Popular vote			Seats		
Alliance	Party	Votes	%	±pp	Contested	Won	+/−
NDA	Nationalist Democratic Progressive Party	369,143	32.24	▲7.02	40	25	▲7
NDA	Bharatiya Janata Party	215,292	18.8	▲3.51	20	12	Steady
NDA	Total	584,184	51.04	▲10.53	60	37	▲7
None	Nationalist Congress Party	109,467	9.56	▲8.50	12	7	▲7
None	National People's Party	65,920	5.76	▼1.14	12	5	▲3
None	Lok Janshakti Party (Ram Vilas)	98,972	8.64	▲8.65	16	2	▲2
None	Naga People's Front	81,195	7.09	▼31.71	22	2	▼2
None	Republican Party of India (Athawale)	42,191	3.69	TBD	8	2	▲2
None	Janata Dal (United)	37,182	3.25	▼1.25	7	1	Steady
None	Indian National Congress	40,810	3.56	▲1.45	23	0	Steady
None	Independents	71737	6.27	TBD		4	▲3
None	Others	TBD	0.83	TBD		0	Steady
None	NOTA	3,512	0.31	▼0.26			
Total	100%						
Valid votes							
Invalid votes							
Votes cast/ turnout							
Abstentions							
Registered voters							

=== Results by district ===
District	Seats				
District	Seats	NEDA	NCP	NPF	OTH
Dimapur	2	2	—N/a	—N/a	—N/a
Chümoukedima	2	2	—N/a	—N/a	—N/a
Chümoukedima and Niuland	1	1	—N/a	—N/a	—N/a
Peren	2	1	1	—N/a	—N/a
Tseminyü	1	—N/a	—N/a	—N/a	1
Zünheboto	7	4	2	—N/a	1
Kohima	6	4	—N/a	—N/a	2
Phek	5	3	—N/a	1	1
Mokokchung	10	9	—N/a	—N/a	1
Wokha	4	2	1	1	—N/a
Mon	9	5	1	—N/a	3
Longleng	2	—N/a	1	—N/a	1
Tuensang	4	2	1	—N/a	1
Noklak	2	—N/a	—N/a	—N/a	2
Shamator	1	1	—N/a	—N/a	—N/a
Kiphire	2	1	—N/a	—N/a	1
Total	60	37	7	2	14

=== Results by constituency ===
District	Constituency		Winner				Runner-up				Margin
District	No.	Name	Candidate	Party	Votes	%	Candidate	Party	Votes	%	Margin
Dimapur	1	Dimapur I	H. Tovihoto Ayemi	BJP	13,325	67.01	Kewekhape Therie	INC	6,366	32.01	6,959
Dimapur	2	Dimapur II (ST)	Moatoshi Longkumer	NDPP	23,856	53.19	Y.Vikheho Awomi	LJP(RV)	18,709	41.71	5,147
Chümoukedima	3	Dimapur III (ST)	Hekani Jakhalu Kense	NDPP	14,395	45.16	Azheto Zhimomi	LJP(RV)	12,859	40.34	1,536
Chümoukedima	4	Ghaspani I (ST)	Jacob Zhimomi	BJP	32,037	55.95	V. Phushika Aomi	IND	11,941	20.85	20,096
Chümoukedima	5	Ghaspani II (ST)	Zhaleo Rio	NDPP	11,405	46.48	Z. Kasheto Yeptho	RPI(A)	7,230	29.46	4,175
Peren	6	Tening (ST)	Namri Nchang	NCP	6,736	29.39	Tarie Zeliang	NDPP	6,399	27.92	337
Peren	7	Peren (ST)	T. R. Zeliang	NDPP	16,800	67.36	Kingudi Joseph	NPF	6,885	27.61	9,915
Kohima	8	Western Angami (ST)	Salhoutuonuo Kruse	NDPP	7,078	49.74	Keneizhakho Nakhro	IND	7,071	49.69	7
Kohima	9	Kohima Town (ST)	Tseilhoutuo Rhütso	NPP	9,682	49.56	Neikiesalie Nicky Kire	NDPP	8,502	42.81	1,180
Kohima	10	Northern Angami I (ST)	Kekhrielhoulie Yhome	NDPP	7,724	55.85	Khriehu Liezietsu	NPF	6,034	43.63	1,690
Kohima	11	Northern Angami II (ST)	Neiphiu Rio	NDPP	17,045	92.87	Seyievilie Sachü	INC	1,221	6.65	15,824
Tseminyü	12	Tseminyü (ST)	Jwenga Seb	JD(U)	8,096	35.90	Loguseng Semp	RPI(A)	5,533	24.54	2,563
Zünheboto	13	Pughoboto (ST)	Sukhato A. Sema	LJP(RV)	7,808	52.80	Y. Vikheho Swu	NDPP	6,958	47.05	850
Kohima	14	Southern Angami I (ST)	Kevipodi Sophie	IND	6,643	50.53	Medo Yhokha	NDPP	6,466	49.18	177
Kohima	15	Southern Angami II (ST)	Kropol Vitsü	BJP	5,985	36.97	Zale Neikha	NCP	5,535	34.19	450
Phek	16	Pfütsero (ST)	Neisatuo Mero	IND	7,995	42.06	Neiba Kronu	NDPP	7,891	41.52	104
Phek	17	Chizami (ST)	K. G. Kenye	NDPP	7,088	43.28	Kevechutso Doulo	LJP(RV)	5,809	35.47	1,279
Phek	18	Chozuba (ST)	Küdecho Khamo	NDPP	9,485	41.15	Chotisuh Sazo	LJP(RV)	7,247	31.44	2,238
Phek	19	Phek (ST)	Kuzholuzo Nienu	NPF	9,485	48.92	Kupota Khesoh	NDPP	9,437	48.68	48
Phek	20	Meluri (ST)	Z. Nyusietho Nyuthe	NDPP	11,256	58.04	Yitachu	LJP(RV)	7,676	39.58	3,580
Mokokchung	21	Tuli (ST)	A. Pangjung Jamir	BJP	10,319	58.47	Amenba Yaden	NCP	7,290	41.31	3,029
Mokokchung	22	Arkakong (ST)	Nuklutoshi	NPP	9,387	53.36	Imnatiba	NDPP	8,184	46.52	1,203
Mokokchung	23	Impur (ST)	T. M. Mannen	NDPP	6,825	54.24	Bendangkokba	INC	5,730	45.53	1,095
Mokokchung	24	Angetyongpang (ST)	Tongpang Ozüküm	NDPP	8,046	51.14	K. Wati	IND	5,826	37.03	2,220
Mokokchung	25	Mongoya (ST)	Imkongmar	NDPP	6,818	41.91	S. Supongmeren Jamir	INC	5,776	35.51	1,042
Mokokchung	26	Aonglenden (ST)	Sharingain Longkümer	NDPP	7,074	72.24	Toshipokba	INC	2,684	27.41	4,390
Mokokchung	27	Mokokchung Town (ST)	Metsübo Jamir	NDPP	5,318	78.66	Alem Jongshi	INC	1,407	20.81	3,911
Mokokchung	28	Koridang (ST)	Imkong L. Imchen	BJP	8,340	43.56	Toshikaba	NPF	7,930	41.42	410
Mokokchung	29	Jangpetkong (ST)	Temjenmemba	NDPP	6,238	55.39	Imjongwati Longkumer	NPF	4,237	37.62	2,001
Mokokchung	30	Alongtaki (ST)	Temjen Imna Along	BJP	5,439	56.14	J. Lanu Longchar	JD(U)	4,237	43.73	1,202
Zünheboto	31	Akuluto (ST)	Kazheto Kinimi	BJP	Elected Unopposed						
Zünheboto	32	Atoizü (ST)	Picto Shohe	NCP	8,294	51.83	Kahuli Sema	BJP	7,692	48.07	602
Zünheboto	33	Suruhoto (ST)	S. Toiho Yeptho	NCP	6,919	50.18	H. Khehovi	BJP	6,850	49.68	69
Zünheboto	34	Aghunato (ST)	G. Ikuto Zhimomi	NDPP	7,133	52.04	Hukiye N. Tissica	LJP(RV)	6,541	47.72	592
Zünheboto	35	Zünheboto (ST)	K. Tokugha Sukhalu	NDPP	15,921	80.04	Akavi Sumi	NPF	3,893	19.57	12,028
Zünheboto	36	Satakha (ST)	G. Kaito Aye	NDPP	8,875	53.99	Zheito Chophy	LJP(RV)	7,524	45.77	1,351
Wokha	37	Tyüi (ST)	Yanthungo Patton	BJP	16,641	67.83	Senchumo Lotha	JD(U)	7,800	31.79	8,841
Wokha	38	Wokha (ST)	Y. Mhonbemo Hümtsoe	NCP	15,949	54.64	Renponthung Ezung	BJP	12,888	44.16	3,061
Wokha	39	Sanis (ST)	Mhathung Yanthan	NDPP	15,076	65.85	Senkathung Jami	RJD	5,563	24.30	9,513
Wokha	40	Bhandari (ST)	Achumbemo Kikon	NPF	13,867	54.11	Mmhonlumo Kikon	BJP	10,278	40.11	3,589
Mon	41	Tizit (ST)	P. Paiwang Konyak	BJP	10,428	52.99	T. Thomas Konyak	INC	5,825	29.60	4,603
Mon	42	Wakching (ST)	W. Chingang Konyak	NDPP	9,166	58.56	M. Honang Jess	NPP	6,433	41.10	2,733
Mon	43	Tapi (ST)	Noke Wangnao	NDPP	5,864	40.14	Wanglem Konyak	NPF	5,782	39.58	82
Mon	44	Phomching (ST)	K. Konngam Konyak	BJP	9,803	58.09	Pohwang Konyak	NCP	6,926	41.04	2,877
Mon	45	Tehok (ST)	C. L. John	NDPP	9,232	78.55	C. Kawang Konyak	NPF	2,162	18.40	7,070
Mon	46	Mon Town (ST)	Y. Mankhao Konyak	NCP	10,870	56.71	Cheong Konyak	BJP	8,259	43.09	2,611
Mon	47	Aboi (ST)	C. Manpon Konyak	IND	6,771	52.79	Wangka Konyak	RPI(A)	3,247	25.32	3,524
Mon	48	Moka (ST)	A. Nyamnyei Konyak	NPP	8,857	50.70	E. E. Pangteang	NDPP	8,301	47.51	556
Longleng	49	Tamlu (ST)	B. Bangtick Phom	IND	8,646	51.15	B. S. Nganlang Phom	NDPP	7,952	47.04	694
Longleng	50	Longleng (ST)	A. Pongshi Phom	NCP	16,908	57.90	S. Pangnyu Phom	BJP	11,638	39.85	5,270
Tuensang	51	Noksen (ST)	Y. Lima Onen Chang	RPI(A)	5,151	50.73	H. Chuba Chang	NDPP	4,963	48.88	188
Tuensang	52	Longkhim–Chare (ST)	Sethrongkyu Sangtam	BJP	10,187	50.33	Muthingnyuba Sangtam	NCP	8,564	42.31	1,623
Tuensang	53	Tuensang Sadar I (ST)	P. Bashangmongba Chang	BJP	12,638	63.30	Toyang Chang	NCP	6,994	35.03	5,644
Tuensang	54	Tuensang Sadar II (ST)	Imtichoba	RPI(A)	5,514	36.19	K. Odibendang Chang	NDPP	5,114	33.56	400
Mon	55	Tobu (ST)	Naiba Konyak	LJP(RV)	10,622	51.17	N. Bongkhao Konyak	NDPP	10,116	48.73	506
Noklak	56	Noklak (ST)	P. Longon	NCP	8,482	52.18	H. Haiying	BJP	7,748	47.67	734
Noklak	57	Thonoknyu (ST)	Benei M. Lamthiu	NPP	10,462	56.06	S. Heno Khiamniungan	NDPP	8,137	43.60	2,325
Shamator	58	Shamator–Chessore (ST)	S. Keoshu Yimchunger	NDPP	9,065	56.25	R. Tohanba	LJP(RV)	6,770	42.01	2,295
Kiphire	59	Seyochung–Sitimi (ST)	C. Kipili Sangtam	NPP	11,936	51.84	V. Kashiho Sangtam	BJP	11,006	47.80	930
Kiphire	60	Pungro–Kiphire (ST)	S. Kiusumew Yimchunger	NDPP	16,098	53.59	T. Yangseo Sangtam	RPI(A)	13,807	45.97	2,291

== By-elections (2023-2028) ==
Date	S.No	Constituency	MLA before election	Party before election	Elected MLA	Party after election	Reason
7 November 2023	48	Tapi	Noke Wangnao	Nationalist Democratic Progressive Party	Wangpang Konyak	Nationalist Democratic Progressive Party	Died on 28 August 2023
9 April 2026	28	Koridang	Imkong L. Imchen	Bharatiya Janata Party	Daochier L. Imchen	Bharatiya Janata Party	Died on 11 November 2025

== See also ==
- 2023 elections in India
- Elections in Nagaland
- Local government in Nagaland
