= 2018 Nagaland Legislative Assembly election =

Legislative assembly elections in India

- 27 February 2018

59 out of 60 seats (1 Unopposed) in the Nagaland Legislative Assembly 31 seats needed for a majority
- Turnout: 85.62%
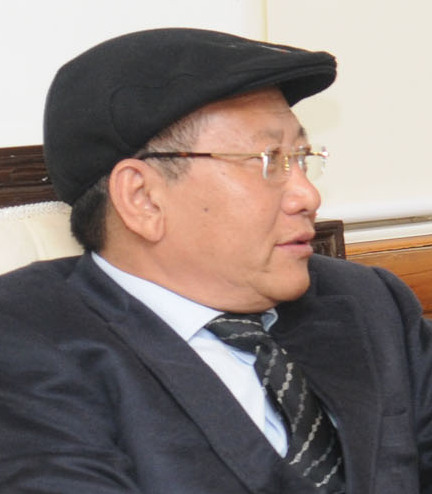

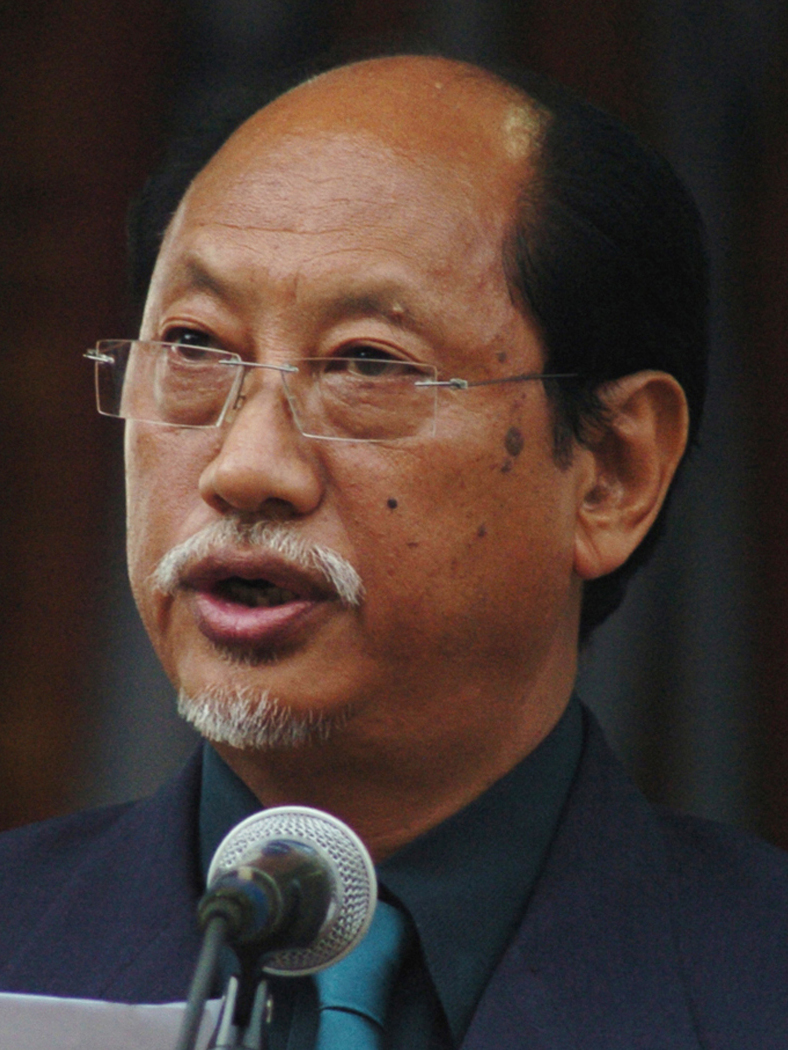

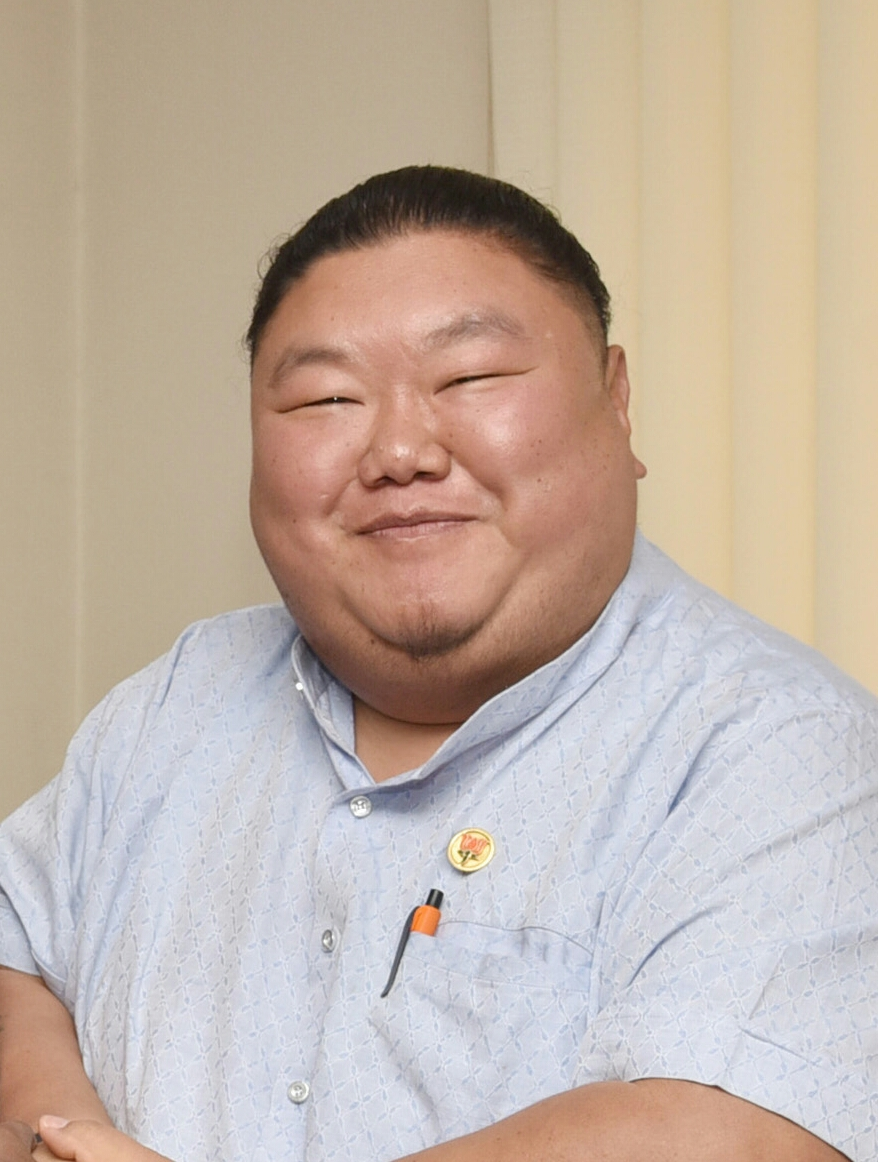

	First party	Second party	Third party
Leader	T. R. Zeliang	Neiphiu Rio	Temjen Imma Along
Party	NPF	NDPP	BJP
Alliance	-	NDA	NDA
Leader's seat	Peren	Northern Angami II	Alongtaki
Last election	38	new	1
Seats won	26	18	12
Seat change	▼12	▲18	▲11
Popular vote	389,912	253,090	153,864
Percentage	38.8%	25.2	15.3
Swing	▼8.2%	new	▲15.3%
	Fourth party	Fifth party
Party	NPP	JD(U)
Alliance	NDA	NDA
Last election	new	1
Seats won	2	1
Seat change	▲2	Steady
Popular vote	69,506	45,089
Percentage	6.9%	4.5%
Swing	new	▲2.8%
- Seatwise result map of the election

- Structure of the Nagaland Legislative Assembly after the election
Chief Minister before election
T. R. Zeliang
NPF
Chief Minister after election
Neiphiu Rio
NDPP

The elections to the 13th Nagaland State Legislative Assembly was held on 27th February 2018 in 59 out of its 60 constituencies, with one member elected unopposed. The counting of votes took place on 3rd March 2018. The incumbent Naga People's Front (NPF) lost the elections, while Chief minister T. R. Zeliang retained his seat. Former NPF leader, Neiphiu Rio joined the Nationalist Democratic Progressive Party (NDPP) before the elections. Subsequently, with two-thirds majority in the assembly, the NDPP-Bharatiya Janata Party alliance formed the government with Rio as the new Chief Minister of Nagaland.

== Background ==
The tenure of the 12th Nagaland State Legislative Assembly ended on 13th March 2018.

On 22 Jan 2018, former CM K. L. Chishi joined the BJP along with 12 other leaders and former lawmakers, including former Independent legislator Jacob Zhimomi, at an event in Dimapur. In the absence of a permanent solution to the Indo-Naga conflict, 11 parties issued a statement calling for the postponement of the polls.

The BJP-led National Democratic Alliance and the ruling Naga Peoples' Front dissolved their electoral alliance prior to the election. The BJP instead chose to form an alliance with the newly formed Nationalist Democratic Progressive Party, led by former CM Neiphiu Rio.

== Schedule ==
The dates of the election were announced on 18 January 2018.

Event	Date	Day
Date for nominations	31 Jan 2018	Wednesday
Last date for filing nominations	7 Feb 2018	Wednesday
Date for scrutiny of nominations	8 Feb 2018	Thursday
Last date for withdrawal of candidatures	12 Feb 2018	Monday
Date of poll	27 Feb 2018	Tuesday
Date of counting	3 Mar 2018	Saturday
Date before which the election shall be completed	5 Mar 2018	Monday

== Parties and alliances ==
=== Naga People's Front ===
Party	Flag	Symbol	Leader	Seats contested
Naga People's Front			T. R. Zeliang	58

=== North East Democratic Alliance ===
Party	Flag	Symbol	Leader	Seats contested
Nationalist Democratic Progressive Party			Neiphiu Rio	40
Bharatiya Janata Party			Temjen Imma Along	20
Total				60

=== Indian National Congress ===
Party	Flag	Symbol	Leader	Seats contested
Indian National Congress			Kewekhape Therie	18

=== Others ===
Party	Flag	Symbol	Leader	Seats contested
National People's Party			Conrad Sangma	25
Janata Dal (United)			Nitish Kumar	13
Nationalist Congress Party			Sharad Pawar	6
Aam Aadmi Party			Arvind Kejriwal	3
Lok Janshakti Party			Ram Vilas Paswan	2

== Exit polls ==
Polling firm	Date published				
Polling firm	Date published	NDPP+	NPF	INC	Others
JanKiBaat-NewsX	27 January 2018	27-32	20-25	0-2	5-7
CVoter	27 January 2018	25-31	19-25	0-4	6-10

== Result ==
Nine parties registered to contest the election, as well as a further 11 independent candidates. Lok Sabha MP and former Chief Minister Neiphiu Rio of the Nationalist Democratic Progressive Party was declared elected uncontested in the Northern Angami II constituency after no other candidate was nominated against him.

The scheduled election in Northern Angami II constituency did not take place as only incumbent MLA Neiphiu Rio was nominated and was therefore declared elected unopposed.

Parties and coalitions	Popular vote			Seats		
Parties and coalitions	Votes	%	±pp	Candidates	Won	+/−
Naga People's Front (NPF)	389,912	38.8		58	26	▼12
NDPP (NDPP)	253,090	25.2		40	18	▲18
Bharatiya Janata Party (BJP)	153,864	15.3		20	12	▲11
National People's Party (NPP)	69,506	6.9		25	2	▲2
Janata Dal (United) (JD(U))	45,089	4.5		13	1	Steady
Independents (IND)	43,008	4.3		11	1	▼7
Indian National Congress (INC)	20,752	2.1		18	0	▼8
Nationalist Congress Party (NCP)	10,693	1.1		6	0	▼4
Aam Aadmi Party (AAP)	7,491	0.7		3	0	Steady
Lok Janshakti Party (LJP)	2,765	0.3		2	0	Steady
None of the above (NOTA)						
Total	1,004,760	100.00		196	60	±0
Valid votes	1,004,760	97.53				
Invalid votes	2,489	2.47				
Votes cast / turnout	1,007,249	85.62				
Abstentions	169,183	14.38				
Registered voters	1,176,432					

=== Results by constituency ===
Winner, runner-up, voter turnout, and victory margin in every constituency
Assembly Constituency		Turnout	Winner				Runner Up				Margin
#k	Names	%	Candidate	Party	Votes	%	Candidate	Party	Votes	%	Margin
1	Dimapur I	80.90	H. Tovihoto Ayemi	BJP	11,721	63.16	Pukhavi Yepthomi	NPF	5,121	27.60	6,600
2	Dimapur II	74.14	Moatoshi Longkumer	NPF	21,942	56.26	Supulebten	NDPP	15,003	38.47	6,939
3	Dimapur III	81.14	Azheto Zhimomi	NPF	13,162	48.40	Tokheho	NDPP	11,024	40.54	2,138
4	Ghaspani I	78.94	Jacob Zhimomi	BJP	23,391	44.44	Z. Kasheto Yeptho	IND	20,796	39.51	2,595
5	Ghaspani II	86.52	Zhaleo Rio	NDPP	10,939	47.55	Kevingulie Khro	NPF	6,023	26.18	4,916
6	Tening	76.99	Namri Nchang	NDPP	7,018	34.08	Namduadi Rangkau Zeliang	NPF	6,850	33.26	168
7	Peren	78.20	T. R. Zeliang	NPF	14,064	60.48	Iherie Ndang	NDPP	8,632	37.12	5,432
8	Western Angami	82.42	Keneizhakho Nakhro	NPF	6,516	46.21	Kevisekho Kruse	NDPP	5,822	41.29	694
9	Kohima Town	72.64	Neikiesalie Nicky Kire	NDPP	12,605	53.78	Tseilhoutuo Rhütso	NPF	10,233	43.66	2,372
10	Northern Angami I	76.95	Khriehu Liezietsu	NPF	7,782	58.21	Kekhrielhoulie Yhome	NDPP	5,266	39.39	2,516
11	Northern Angami II	-	Neiphiu Rio	NDPP	Elected Unopposed						
12	Tseminyü	90.05	R. Khing	NDPP	7,925	35.82	Levi Rengma	NPP	7,062	31.92	863
13	Pughoboto	93.31	Y. Vikheho Swu	NPF	6,258	48.21	Sukhato A. Sema	BJP	6,188	47.67	70
14	Southern Angami I	84.87	Vikho-o Yhoshü	NDPP	5,821	50.82	Medokul Sophie	NPP	3,739	32.64	2,082
15	Southern Angami II	82.23	Zale Neikha	NDPP	7,563	52.10	Kropol Vitsu	NPF	6,792	46.79	771
16	Pfütsero	81.92	Neiba Kronu	NDPP	6,228	36.17	Thenucho	NPF	4,914	28.54	1,314
17	Chizami	89.15	Kezhienyi Khalo	NPF	6,563	42.27	Kevechutso Doulo	BJP	6,160	39.67	403
18	Chozuba	88.76	Chotisuh Sazo	NPF	11,432	51.39	Kudecho Khamo	NDPP	10,490	47.16	942
19	Phek	84.63	Küzholuzo Nienü	NPF	11,127	60.28	Kupota Khesoh	NDPP	6,196	33.57	4,931
20	Meluri	92.26	Yitachu	NPF	7,928	46.68	Z. Nyusietho Nyuthe	NDPP	7,854	46.24	74
21	Tuli	83.44	Amenba Yaden	NPF	3,865	26.44	L. Temjen Jamir	JD(U)	2,979	20.38	886
22	Arkakong	87.70	Imnatiba	NPP	6,307	43.49	Nuklutoshi	NPF	5,514	38.02	793
23	Impur	95.00	Imtiwapang Aier	NPF	4,852	49.70	T. N. Mannen	NDPP	4,790	49.06	62
24	Angetyongpang	80.34	Tongpang Ozüküm	IND	4,607	36.03	Alemtemshi Jamir	NDPP	3,657	28.60	950
25	Mongoya	84.83	Ngangshi K. Ao	NPF	6,883	49.12	Alemtemshi Jamir	NDPP	6,535	46.64	348
26	Aonglenden	85.42	Imtikümzük Longkümer	NDPP	5,206	47.92	Toshipokba	NPF	5,118	47.11	88
27	Mokokchung Town	78.09	Metsübo Jamir	NDPP	2,964	50.08	Chubatoshi Apok Jamir	NPF	1,960	33.11	1,004
28	Koridang	90.51	Imkong L. Imchen	NPF	7,525	46.42	T. Chalukumba Ao	NPP	7,397	45.64	128
29	Jangpetkong	90.31	Longrineken	BJP	3,615	35.09	E. T. Sunup	NPF	3,339	32.41	276
30	Alongtaki	82.73	Temjen Imna Along	BJP	5,981	49.96	Benjongliba Aier	NPF	5,895	49.24	86
31	Akuluto	89.55	Kazheto Kinimi	BJP	4,844	52.57	K. Khekaho Assumi	NPF	4,109	44.60	735
32	Atoizu	92.79	Picto Shohe	NPF	7,643	51.26	Kiyezhe L. Chishi	BJP	6,805	45.64	838
33	Suruhoto	88.22	H. Khehovi	BJP	10,860	79.78	Kaito Jakhalu	NPF	2,301	16.90	8,559
34	Aghunato	76.82	Pukhayi	NDPP	6,399	53.96	Hukiye N. Tissica	NPF	4,978	41.98	1,421
35	Zünheboto	79.45	K. Tokugha Sukhalu	NDPP	9,430	55.39	S. Hukavi Zhimomi	NPF	6,882	40.42	2,548
36	Satakha	82.80	G. Kaito Aye	JD(U)	6,431	47.18	Zheito Chophy	NPF	3,888	28.53	2,543
37	Tyüi	93.10	Yanthungo Patton	BJP	11,709	53.51	Yankithung Yanthan	NPF	8,617	39.38	3,092
38	Wokha	84.06	Chumben Murry	NPF	14,870	54.13	Y. Mhonbemo Hümtsoe	JD(U)	6,315	22.99	8,555
39	Sanis	94.42	Mhathung Yanthan	NDPP	10,548	49.19	Ramongo Lotha	JD(U)	7,556	35.23	2,992
40	Bhandari	94.58	Mmhonlümo Kikon	BJP	11,205	44.72	Achumbemo Kikon	NPF	10,893	43.47	312
41	Tizit	93.63	P. Paiwang Konyak	BJP	6,981	40.75	Y. Wangto Konyak	IND	4,595	26.82	2,386
42	Wakching	93.59	Y. M. Yollow Konyak	NPF	7,808	55.05	M. C. Konyak	NDPP	6,044	42.61	1,764
43	Tapi	91.29	Noke Wangnao	NDPP	4,284	37.17	N. Aphoa Konyak	JD(U)	3,047	26.44	1,237
44	Phomching	89.46	Pohwang Konyak	NDPP	6,611	44.64	K. Konngam Konyak	NPF	5,979	40.37	632
45	Tehok	92.18	C. L. John	NPF	7,463	68.54	C. Kawang Konyak	BJP	2,907	26.70	4,556
46	Mon Town	89.89	N. Thongwang Konyak	NPF	5,429	31.99	Y. Mankhao Konyak	NDPP	5,401	31.83	28
47	Aboi	94.04	E. Eshak Konyak	NPF	6,036	52.88	Awan Konyak	NDPP	5,131	44.95	905
48	Moka	94.46	E. E. Pangteang	NPF	7,684	50.00	K. Kiko Konyak	NDPP	7,536	49.04	148
49	Tamlu	94.20	B. S. Nganlang Phom	NPF	6,582	41.66	B. Phongshak Phom	NDPP	5,624	35.60	958
50	Longleng	94.53	S. Pangnyu Phom	BJP	9,987	40.80	Y. B. Angam Phom	NPP	8,981	36.69	1,006
51	Noksen	86.37	C. M. Chang	NDPP	4,436	43.07	W. Chingmak Chang	NPF	3,860	37.48	576
52	Longkhim Chare	93.80	Muthingnyuba Sangtam	NPF	9,316	46.37	A. Imtilemba Sangtam	BJP	7,468	37.17	1,848
53	Tuensang Sadar I	78.62	Toyang Chang	NPF	10,087	56.88	T. Mongko Chang	NDPP	6,828	38.50	3,259
54	Tuensang Sadar II	89.02	Kejong Chang	NPF	6,204	45.64	H. Zungkum Chang	NCP	4,405	32.41	1,799
55	Tobu	95.35	N. Bongkhao Konyak	NDPP	9,732	54.31	Naiba Konyak	NPF	7,991	44.59	1,741
56	Noklak	89.27	H. Haiying	BJP	5,643	39.98	P. Longon	NPF	5,638	39.95	5
57	Thonoknyu	87.47	L. Khumo Khiamniungan	NPP	8,389	51.32	S. Heno Khiamniungan	NPF	4,345	26.58	4,044
58	Shamator–Chessore	86.25	Toshi Wungtung	NDPP	4,311	28.41	R. Tohanba	NPF	4,004	26.38	307
59	Seyochung–Sitimi	85.30	V. Kashiho Sangtam	BJP	9,830	52.28	C. Kipili Sangtam	NPF	8,668	46.10	1,162
60	Pungro–Kiphire	78.32	T. Torechu	NPF	8,056	35.18	T. Yangseo Sangtam	JD(U)	7,583	33.11	473

== Government Formation ==
Neiphiu Rio, the leader of the Nationalist Democratic Progressive Party was sworn in as the Chief Minister of Nagaland on 8 March 2018. The ministry had 12 Cabinet ministers including the Chief Minister. Four incumbents including the Chief Minister belonged to the Nationalist Democratic Progressive Party, while six ministers including the Deputy Chief Minister belong to the Bharatiya Janata Party. One minister was a Naga People's Front MLA. One minister is an independent MLA. Later, two MLAs from NPP and one from JD(U) merged with Nationalist Democratic Progressive Party

== By-elections (2018-2023) ==
S.No	Date	Constituency	MLA before election	Party before election	Elected MLA	Party after election
26	11 April 2019	Aonglenden	Imtikumzuk Longkumer	Nationalist Democratic Progressive Party	Sharingain Longkumer	Nationalist Democratic Progressive Party
14	3 November 2020	Southern Angami-I	Vikho-o Yhoshü	Nationalist Democratic Progressive Party	Medo Yhokha	Nationalist Democratic Progressive Party
60	3 November 2020	Pungro Kiphire	T. Torechu	Naga People's Front	T. Yangseo Sangtam	Independent
51	17 April 2021	Noksen	C. M. Chang	Nationalist Democratic Progressive Party	H. Chuba Chang	Nationalist Democratic Progressive Party
58	30 October 2021	Shamator–Chessore	Toshi Wungtung	Nationalist Democratic Progressive Party	Keoshu Yimchunger	Nationalist Democratic Progressive Party

== See also ==
- Elections in India
- 2018 elections in India
