= Political parties in Nagaland =

== Major National Parties ==
- Bharatiya Janata Party (BJP)
- Indian National Congress (INC)

== Major Regional Parties ==
- Naga People's Front (NPF) of Neiphiu Rio

== Minor National-Level Parties ==
- National People's Party (NPP) found by late P. A. Sangma
- Nationalist Congress Party (NCP)
- Janata Dal (United) (JDU) led by Nitish Kumar
- Rashtriya Janata Dal (RJD)
- Republican Party of India (RPI) led by Ramdas Athawale
- Lok Janshakti Party (LJP) led by Ram Vilas Paswan
- Aam Aadmi Party (AAP) led by Arvind Kejriwal
- Communist Party of India (CPI)

== Minor Regional Parties ==
- Naga National Democratic Party (NNDP)
- Rising People's Party (RPP)
- United Naga Democratic Party (UNDP)

== Defunct Political Parties ==
- National Convention of Nagaland {merged with Naga Peoples Convention}
- Naga Peoples Convention {merged with Naga Nationalist Organisation}
- Naga Nationalist Organisation (NNO) {merged with Congress}
- Naga People's Party {merged with Nagaland People's Council}
- Democratic Labour Party
- United Democratic Front (UDF) {merged into Naga National Democratic Party
- United Democratic Front - Progressive (UDF-P) {merged with Congress}
- Naga National Party (NNP) {merged into Naga National Democratic Party}
- Nagaland People's Council (NPC) {renamed as Naga Peoples Front}
- Nagaland Peoples Party (NPP) {merged with Naga Peoples Front}
- Nagaland Democratic Party (NDP) {merged with Naga Peoples Front}
- Nationalist Democratic Movement (NDM) {merged with BJP}
- Democratic Progressive Party (DPP) {renamed as Nationalist Democratic Progressive Party}
- Nationalist Democratic Progressive Party (NDPP) {merged with NPF}
- Nagaland Congress (NC) {merged with NPP}
