= S. Kiusumew Yimchunger =

Indian politician (born 1961)

S. Kiusumew Yimchunger (born 1961) is an Indian politician from Nagaland. He is an MLA from the Pungro Kiphire Assembly constituency, which is reserved for Scheduled Tribe community, in Kiphire district. He won the 2023 Nagaland Legislative Assembly election, representing the Naga People's Front. He is the chief minister's advisor on Home Guards, Civil Defence and Fire and Emergency Services, to the government of Nagaland.

== Early life and education ==
Yimchunger is from Pungro, Kiphire district, Nagaland. He is the son of Supikiu. He studied Class 8 and passed the examination conducted by the Nagaland Board of School Education in 1979.

== Career ==
Yimchunger won the Pungro Kiphire Assembly constituency representing Nationalist Democratic Progressive Party in the 2023 Nagaland Legislative Assembly election. He polled 16,098 votes and defeated his nearest rival and sitting MLA, T. Yangseo Sangtam of the Republican Party of India (Athawale), by a margin of 2,291 votes.
