= Moatoshi Longkumer =

Indian politician

Advisor
- 07 March 2023 – Incumbent: Labour & Employment, Skill Development & Entrepreneurship and Excise.

Personal details
- Party: NPF
- Other political affiliations: NDPP
- Occupation: Politician

Moatoshi Longkumer is an Indian politician and has been a Member of the Nagaland Legislative Assembly from Dimapur II constituency since 2018. He is the Advisor for Labour & Employment, Skill Development & Entrepreneurship and Excise. He was a member of the Naga People's Front and later joined the Nationalist Democratic Progressive Party. In 2025, he rejoined the Naga People's Front after it merged with the NDPP.

== Electoral history ==
2023 Nagaland Legislative Assembly election : Dimapur II
Party	Candidate	Votes	%	±%
NDPP	Moatoshi Longkumer	23,856	53.19%	
LJP(RV)	Y. Vikheho Awomi	18,709	41.71%	
INC	S. Amento Chishi	1,784	3.98%	
NOTA	Nota	505	1.13%	−0.25%
Margin of victory		5,147	11.48%	−6.46%
Turnout		44,854	76.51%	2.36%
Registered electors		58,627		12.36%
NDPP gain from NPF		Swing	-3.53%	

=== Assembly Election 2018 ===
2018 Nagaland Legislative Assembly election : Dimapur II
Party	Candidate	Votes	%	±%
NPF	Moatoshi Longkumer	21,942	56.72%	28.22%
NDPP	Supulebten	15,003	38.78%	
AAP	Dr. S. Amos Lkr	1,211	3.13%	
NOTA	None of the Above	531	1.37%	
Margin of victory		6,939	17.94%	13.61%
Turnout		38,687	74.14%	−6.12%
Registered electors		52,179		12.17%
NPF gain from INC		Swing	18.81%	

=== Assembly Election 2013 ===
2013 Nagaland Legislative Assembly election : Alongtaki
Party	Candidate	Votes	%	±%
NPF	Dr. Benjongliba Aier	7,087	55.13%	−4.67%
Independent	Moatoshi Longkumer	5,596	43.53%	
INC	Imlitemsu	172	1.34%	−34.07%
Margin of victory		1,491	11.60%	−12.80%
Turnout		12,855	92.98%	8.75%
Registered electors		13,825		−26.86%
NPF hold		Swing	-4.67%	
