= Sukhato A. Sema =

Indian politician

14th Nagaland Legislative Assembly
- Incumbent
- Assumed office 20 February 2023

Member of Lok Janshakti Party (Ram Vilas)

Personal details
- Born: 31 October 1958 (age 67) Zünheboto, Nagaland, India
- Party: Lok Janshakti Party (Ram Vilas)

Sukhato A. Sema (born 1958) is an Indian politician from Nagaland. He is an MLA from the Pughoboto Assembly constituency, which is reserved for Scheduled Tribe community, in Zunheboto district. He won the 2023 Nagaland Legislative Assembly election, representing the Lok Janshakti Party (Ram Vilas).

== Early life and education ==
Sema is from Pughoboto, Zunheboto District, Nagaland. He is the son of Akhavi Sema. He is a doctor. He passed M.D. in 1984 with a gold medal at All India Institute of Medical Sciences, New Delhi.

== Career ==
Sema won the Pughoboto constituency representing the Lok Janshakti Party (Ram Vilas) in the 2023 Nagaland Legislative Assembly election. He polled 7,808 votes and defeated his nearest rival, Y. Vikheho Swu of the Nationalist Democratic Progressive Party, by 850 votes. In the 2018 Nagaland Legislative Assembly election he contested on a BJP ticket and lost by only 70 votes to Swu, who then represented the Naga People's Front.

In June 2024, he requested the party president Chirag Paswan to address the Naga political issue in the parliament, as Paswan is now the union cabinet minister of Food Processing Industries in the BJP-led NDA government.
