= Namri Nchang =

Indian politician

Namri Nchang (born 1967) is an Indian politician from Nagaland. He is a member of the Nagaland Legislative Assembly from Tening Assembly constituency, which is reserved for Scheduled Tribe community, in Peren district. He won the 2023 Nagaland Legislative Assembly election, representing the Nationalist Congress Party.

== Early life and education ==
Nchang is from Tening, Peren district, Nagaland. He is the son of the late Alabo Nchang. He completed his B.A. in 1991 at B. N. V. Degree College, which is affiliated with Bundelkhand University, Jhansi.

== Career ==
Nchang won the Tening Assembly constituency representing the Nationalist Congress Party in the 2023 Nagaland Legislative Assembly election. He polled 6,736 votes and defeated his nearest rival, Tarie Zeliang of the Nationalist Democratic Progressive Party, by a margin of 337 votes. Earlier, he had become an MLA for the first time, winning the 2013 Nagaland Legislative Assembly election on a Naga People's Front ticket and retaining it in the 2018 Nagaland Legislative Assembly election, to become a three-time MLA. On 31 May 2025, along with six others from the NCP, he joined the Nationalist Democratic Progressive Party which gave the party, led by chief minister Neiphiu Rio, an absolute majority in the house. In 2025, he joined the Naga People's Front after it merged with the Nationalist Democratic Progressive Party.
