= Tening Assembly constituency =

Legislative Assembly constituency in Nagaland State, India

Coordinates: 25.3°N 93.59°E

Tening
- Constituency No. 6 for the Nagaland Legislative Assembly

Constituency details
- Country: India
- Region: Northeast India
- State: Nagaland
- District: Peren
- Lok Sabha constituency: Nagaland
- Established: 1964
- Total electors: 27,405
- Reservation: ST

Member of Legislative Assembly
- 14th Nagaland Legislative Assembly
- Incumbent Namri Nchang
- Party: NPF
- Alliance: NDA
- Elected year: 2023

Tening is one of the 60 Legislative Assembly constituencies of Nagaland state in India.

It is part of Peren district and is reserved for candidates belonging to the Scheduled Tribes.

== Members of the Legislative Assembly ==
Year	Member	Party
1964	Lalkholam Singson	Independent politician
1969	N. Azu Newmai	Independent politician
1974	N. Azu Newmai	United Democratic Alliance
1977	N. C. Zeling	Indian National Congress
1982	Henlum L. Singson	Independent politician
1987	Henlum L. Singson	Indian National Congress
1989	T. R. Zeliang	Naga People's Front
1993	T. R. Zeliang	Indian National Congress
1998	T. R. Zeliang	Indian National Congress
2003	T. R. Zeliang	Indian National Congress
2008	Tarie Zeliang	Indian National Congress
2013	Namri Nchang	Naga People's Front
2018	Namri Nchang	Nationalist Democratic Progressive Party
2023	Namri Nchang	Nationalist Congress Party

== Election results ==
Vote share of winning candidates
2023	29.39%
2018	34.24%
2013	33.48%
2008	59.62%
2003	35.17%
1993	35.11%
1989	39.82%
1987	26.79%
1982	28.37%
1977	31.79%
1974	31.08%
1969	32.62%
1964	56.99%

=== 2023 Assembly election ===
2023 Nagaland Legislative Assembly election: Tening
Party	Candidate	Votes	%	±%
NCP	Namri Nchang	6,736	29.39%	
NDPP	Tarie Zeliang	6,399	27.92%	−6.32%
Independent	Dr. Tumda Newme	5,530	24.13%	
NPP	Zandi Domta	2,467	10.76%	
INC	Rosy Thomson	1,704	7.44%	
NOTA	Nota	42	0.18%	
NPF	Henry Zeliang	39	0.17%	−33.25%
Margin of victory		337	1.47%	0.65%
Turnout		22,917	83.62%	6.63%
Registered electors		27,405		2.95%
NCP gain from NDPP		Swing	-4.85%	

=== 2018 Assembly election ===
2018 Nagaland Legislative Assembly election: Tening
Party	Candidate	Votes	%	±%
NDPP	Namri Nchang	7,018	34.24%	
NPF	Namduadi Rangkau Zeliang	6,850	33.42%	−0.06%
Independent	Tarie Zeliang	6,476	31.60%	
NOTA	None of the Above	150	0.73%	
Margin of victory		168	0.82%	−3.38%
Turnout		20,494	76.99%	−17.18%
Registered electors		26,619		−8.29%
NDPP gain from NPF		Swing	0.76%	

=== 2013 Assembly election ===
2013 Nagaland Legislative Assembly election: Tening
Party	Candidate	Votes	%	±%
NPF	Namri Nchang	9,151	33.48%	−6.94%
INC	Tarie Zeliang	8,003	29.28%	−30.34%
Independent	L. L. Kuki	5,407	19.78%	
NCP	Neiba Ndang	3,930	14.38%	
Margin of victory		1,148	4.20%	−14.99%
Turnout		27,333	94.17%	7.78%
Registered electors		29,026		−1.81%
NPF gain from INC		Swing	-26.14%	

=== 2008 Assembly election ===
2008 Nagaland Legislative Assembly election: Tening
Party	Candidate	Votes	%	±%
INC	Tarie Zeliang	15,224	59.62%	24.45%
NPF	K. Samuel Medaliang	10,323	40.42%	17.39%
Margin of victory		4,901	19.19%	7.06%
Turnout		25,537	86.42%	−8.97%
Registered electors		29,560		55.53%
INC hold		Swing	24.45%	

=== 2003 Assembly election ===
2003 Nagaland Legislative Assembly election: Tening
Party	Candidate	Votes	%	±%
INC	T. R. Zeliang	6,374	35.17%	
NPF	Namri Nchang	4,175	23.04%	
JD(U)	Wizabo	3,449	19.03%	
BJP	Abraham	2,765	15.26%	
NDM	L. L. Kuki	1,361	7.51%	
Margin of victory		2,199	12.13%	
Turnout		18,124	95.36%	−1.23%
Registered electors		19,006		13.92%
INC hold		Swing	0.05%	

=== 1998 Assembly election ===
1998 Nagaland Legislative Assembly election: Tening
Party	Candidate	Votes	%	±%
INC	T. R. Zeliang		{{{percentage}}}	
	{{{candidate}}}	Unopposed		
INC hold		Swing		

=== 1993 Assembly election ===
1993 Nagaland Legislative Assembly election: Tening
Party	Candidate	Votes	%	±%
INC	T. R. Zeliang	6,005	35.11%	3.12%
Independent	Lalkholen	3,461	20.24%	
Independent	Namri Nchang	3,276	19.16%	
NPF	Atui	2,357	13.78%	−26.04%
Independent	Haokhosei	1,629	9.53%	
BJP	N. David	373	2.18%	
Margin of victory		2,544	14.88%	7.05%
Turnout		17,101	96.59%	−2.71%
Registered electors		17,802		106.62%
INC gain from NPF		Swing	-4.71%	

=== 1989 Assembly election ===
1989 Nagaland Legislative Assembly election: Tening
Party	Candidate	Votes	%	±%
NPF	T. R. Zeliang	3,387	39.82%	
INC	H. L. Singson	2,721	31.99%	5.20%
Independent	N. Azu Mewmai	1,382	16.25%	
NPP	Haokhosei	1,015	11.93%	−7.94%
Margin of victory		666	7.83%	7.20%
Turnout		8,505	99.30%	1.49%
Registered electors		8,616		0.14%
NPF gain from INC		Swing	13.03%	

=== 1987 Assembly election ===
1987 Nagaland Legislative Assembly election: Tening
Party	Candidate	Votes	%	±%
INC	Henlum L. Singson	2,235	26.79%	11.98%
NND	T. R. Zeliang	2,182	26.15%	6.34%
NPP	T. Hangsing	1,658	19.87%	
Independent	N. Azu Mewmai	1,407	16.86%	
Independent	N. Namgangbi Chewang	861	10.32%	
Margin of victory		53	0.64%	−7.92%
Turnout		8,343	97.81%	7.93%
Registered electors		8,604		−3.16%
INC gain from Independent		Swing	-1.58%	

=== 1982 Assembly election ===
1982 Nagaland Legislative Assembly election: Tening
Party	Candidate	Votes	%	±%
Independent	Henlum L. Singson	2,222	28.37%	
NND	C. R. Zeliang	1,552	19.81%	
Independent	Taditiu	1,270	16.21%	
INC	N. C. Zeliang	1,160	14.81%	−16.98%
Independent	N. Azu Mewmai	1,064	13.58%	
Independent	Zengdibe	522	6.66%	
Independent	Chungjathang Hangsingkaki	43	0.55%	
Margin of victory		670	8.55%	8.31%
Turnout		7,833	89.88%	0.07%
Registered electors		8,885		12.41%
Independent gain from INC		Swing	-3.42%	

=== 1977 Assembly election ===
1977 Nagaland Legislative Assembly election: Tening
Party	Candidate	Votes	%	±%
INC	N. C. Zeling	2,224	31.79%	
UDA	N. Azu Mewmai	2,207	31.55%	0.47%
NCN	Jangkhosei Hangsingh	1,966	28.10%	
Independent	Paokholun	599	8.56%	
Margin of victory		17	0.24%	−1.37%
Turnout		6,996	89.82%	3.00%
Registered electors		7,904		20.10%
INC gain from UDA		Swing	0.71%	

=== 1974 Assembly election ===
1974 Nagaland Legislative Assembly election: Tening
Party	Candidate	Votes	%	±%
UDA	N. Azu Mewmai	1,730	31.08%	
Independent	Jangkhosei Hangsingh	1,640	29.46%	
NNO	Lalkholam Singson	1,524	27.38%	17.25%
Independent	Ramga	672	12.07%	
Margin of victory		90	1.62%	−9.86%
Turnout		5,566	86.81%	7.37%
Registered electors		6,581		71.92%
UDA gain from Independent		Swing	-1.54%	

=== 1969 Assembly election ===
1969 Nagaland Legislative Assembly election: Tening
Party	Candidate	Votes	%	±%
Independent	N. Azu Mewmai	992	32.62%	
UDF	Kaikholal	643	21.14%	
Independent	Kaisungbo Kaurinta	473	15.55%	
Independent	Wizabo	346	11.38%	
NNO	Lalkholam Singson	308	10.13%	
Independent	Letkhosei	156	5.13%	
Independent	Thangkholan	123	4.04%	
Margin of victory		349	11.48%	−13.21%
Turnout		3,041	79.44%	6.06%
Registered electors		3,828		29.63%
Independent hold		Swing	-24.37%	

=== 1964 Assembly election ===
1964 Nagaland Legislative Assembly election: Tening
Party	Candidate	Votes	%	±%
Independent	Lalkholam Singson	1,235	56.99%	
Independent	Huthombo	700	32.30%	
Independent	Lutjakai	232	10.71%	
Margin of victory		535	24.69%	
Turnout		2,167	73.38%	
Registered electors		2,953		
Independent win (new seat)				

== See also ==
- List of constituencies of the Nagaland Legislative Assembly
- Peren district
