= Northern Angami II Assembly constituency =

Legislative Assembly constituency in Nagaland State, India

Coordinates: 25.77°N 94.04°E

Northern Angami II
- Constituency No. 11 for the Nagaland Legislative Assembly

Constituency details
- Country: India
- Region: Northeast India
- State: Nagaland
- District: Kohima
- Lok Sabha constituency: Nagaland
- Established: 1964
- Total electors: 21,840
- Reservation: ST

Member of Legislative Assembly
- 14th Nagaland Legislative Assembly
- Incumbent Neiphiu Rio; Chief Minister of Nagaland
- Party: NPF
- Alliance: NDA
- Elected year: 2023

Northern Angami II is one of the 60 Legislative Assembly constituencies of Nagaland state in India. It is part of Kohima district and is reserved for candidates belonging to the Scheduled Tribes. It is also part of Nagaland Lok Sabha constituency. Neiphiu Rio, the incumbent Chief Minister of Nagaland, is the current MLA of this constituency.

== Members of the Legislative Assembly ==
Year	Name	Party
1964	Lhousuohie	Independent
1966 (Note: by-election)	Neiphiu Rio	Independent
1969	Neiphiu Rio	United Democratic Alliance
1974	Neiphiu Rio	United Democratic Alliance
1977	Neiphiu Rio	United Democratic Alliance
1982	Neiphiu Rio	United Democratic Alliance
1987	Neiphiu Rio	Indian National Congress
1989	Neiphiu Rio	Indian National Congress
1993	Neiphiu Rio	Indian National Congress
1998	Neiphiu Rio	Indian National Congress
2003	Neiphiu Rio	Naga People's Front
2008	Neiphiu Rio	Naga People's Front
2013	Neiphiu Rio	Naga People's Front
2014 (Note: by-election)	Dr. Neiphrezo Keditsu	Naga People's Front
2018	Neiphiu Rio	Nationalist Democratic Progressive Party
2023	Neiphiu Rio	Nationalist Democratic Progressive Party

== Election results ==
=== 2023 Assembly election ===
2023 Nagaland Legislative Assembly election: Northern Angami II
Party	Candidate	Votes	%	±%
NDPP	Neiphiu Rio	17,045	92.87%	
INC	Seyievilie Sachu	1,221	6.65%	
NOTA	Nota	87	0.47%	
Margin of victory		15,824	86.22%	
Turnout		18,353	84.03%	
Registered electors		21,840		3.97%
NDPP hold		Swing		

=== 2018 Assembly election ===
2018 Nagaland Legislative Assembly election: Northern Angami II
Party	Candidate	Votes	%	±%
NDPP	Neiphiu Rio	Unopposed		
Registered electors		21,006		11.25%
NDPP gain from NPF		Swing		

=== 2014 Assembly by-election ===
This by-election was needed due to the resignation of the sitting MLA, Neiphiu Rio following his election to the Lok Sabha.

By-election 2014: Northern Angami II
Party	Candidate	Votes	%	±%
NPF	Neiphiu Rio	9,909	59.08%	−26.22%
BJP	Visasolie Lhoungu	6,864	40.92%	
Margin of victory		3,045	18.15%	−52.46%
Turnout		16,773	89.27%	−5.17%
Registered electors		18,882		−1.08%
NPF hold		Swing	-26.22%	

=== 2013 Assembly election ===
2013 Nagaland Legislative Assembly election: Northern Angami II
Party	Candidate	Votes	%	±%
NPF	Neiphiu Rio	15,305	85.30%	1.68%
INC	Kevise Sogotsu	2,634	14.68%	−2.97%
Margin of victory		12,671	70.62%	4.66%
Turnout		17,943	94.00%	10.59%
Registered electors		19,089		−3.62%
NPF hold		Swing	1.68%	

=== 2008 Assembly election ===
2008 Nagaland Legislative Assembly election: Northern Angami II
Party	Candidate	Votes	%	±%
NPF	Neiphiu Rio	13,641	83.62%	16.02%
INC	Sevetso	2,880	17.65%	−8.44%
Margin of victory		10,761	65.96%	24.46%
Turnout		16,314	83.41%	83.41%
Registered electors		19,807		17.97%
NPF hold		Swing		

=== 2003 Assembly election ===
2003 Nagaland Legislative Assembly election: Northern Angami II
Party	Candidate	Votes	%	±%
NPF	Neiphiu Rio	9,882	67.60%	
INC	Zakio Metha	3,815	26.10%	
BJP	R. Sopu Angami	565	3.86%	
Independent	Chupfuo	357	2.44%	
Margin of victory		6,067	41.50%	
Turnout		14,619	87.07%	87.07%
Registered electors		16,790		10.91%
NPF gain from INC		Swing		

=== 1998 Assembly election ===
1998 Nagaland Legislative Assembly election: Northern Angami II
Party	Candidate	Votes	%	±%
INC	Neiphiu Rio	Unopposed		
Registered electors		15,138		16.82%
INC hold		Swing		

=== 1993 Assembly election ===
1993 Nagaland Legislative Assembly election: Northern Angami II
Party	Candidate	Votes	%	±%
INC	Neiphiu Rio	5,411	45.17%	−6.63%
Independent	R. Sopu Angami	4,311	35.98%	
NPF	Ketholelie	2,258	18.85%	−29.35%
Margin of victory		1,100	9.18%	5.59%
Turnout		11,980	94.13%	6.72%
Registered electors		12,958		32.29%
INC hold		Swing	-6.63%	

=== 1989 Assembly election ===
1989 Nagaland Legislative Assembly election: Northern Angami II
Party	Candidate	Votes	%	±%
INC	Neiphiu Rio	4,366	51.80%	33.86%
NPF	Chupfuo	4,063	48.20%	
Margin of victory		303	3.59%	2.64%
Turnout		8,429	87.41%	−3.41%
Registered electors		9,795		−0.10%
INC gain from Independent		Swing	28.91%	

=== 1987 Assembly election ===
1987 Nagaland Legislative Assembly election: Northern Angami II
Party	Candidate	Votes	%	±%
Independent	Neiphiu Rio	2,012	22.88%	
Independent	Neiphiu Rio	1,928	21.93%	
NND	Chupfuo	1,848	21.02%	−10.17%
INC	R. Sopu Angami	1,577	17.94%	−1.30%
Independent	Luozolie	1,427	16.23%	
Margin of victory		84	0.96%	−0.76%
Turnout		8,792	90.82%	12.51%
Registered electors		9,805		−9.86%
Independent gain from NND		Swing	-8.30%	

=== 1982 Assembly election ===
1982 Nagaland Legislative Assembly election: Northern Angami II
Party	Candidate	Votes	%	±%
NND	Neiphiu Rio	2,620	31.19%	
Independent	K. V. Keditsu	2,476	29.47%	
INC	R. Sopu Angami	1,616	19.24%	
Independent	Sudlahie	1,552	18.47%	
Independent	Lho-Usao	137	1.63%	
Margin of victory		144	1.71%	−10.11%
Turnout		8,401	78.31%	2.65%
Registered electors		10,877		31.57%
NND gain from UDA		Swing	-11.20%	

=== 1977 Assembly election ===
1977 Nagaland Legislative Assembly election: Northern Angami II
Party	Candidate	Votes	%	±%
UDA	Neiphiu Rio	2,589	42.39%	9.28%
Independent	P. Sopu Angami	1,867	30.57%	
NCN	K. V. Keditsu	1,499	24.54%	
Independent	S. Zakieo	153	2.50%	
Margin of victory		722	11.82%	7.76%
Turnout		6,108	75.66%	−3.06%
Registered electors		8,267		−4.34%
UDA hold		Swing	9.28%	

=== 1974 Assembly election ===
1974 Nagaland Legislative Assembly election: Northern Angami II
Party	Candidate	Votes	%	±%
UDA	Neiphiu Rio	2,201	33.10%	
NNO	Zakio Metha	1,931	29.04%	−0.46%
Independent	Mozolie	1,077	16.20%	
Independent	Lho-Usao	1,023	15.39%	
Independent	Sazollie	322	4.84%	
Independent	Kekuo	95	1.43%	
Margin of victory		270	4.06%	−2.13%
Turnout		6,649	78.72%	−0.80%
Registered electors		8,642		81.86%
UDA gain from NNO		Swing	3.60%	

=== 1969 Assembly election ===
1969 Nagaland Legislative Assembly election: Northern Angami II
Party	Candidate	Votes	%	±%
NNO	Neiphiu Rio	1,115	29.51%	
Independent	Lho-Usao	881	23.31%	
UDF	Zakio Metha	780	20.64%	
Independent	Lhoutuo	539	14.26%	
Independent	Thinuokielie	464	12.28%	
Margin of victory		234	6.19%	
Turnout		3,779	79.52%	
Registered electors		4,752		
NNO gain from Independent		Swing		

=== 1966 Assembly by-election ===
1966 Nagaland Legislative Assembly by-election: Northern Angami II
Party	Candidate	Votes	%	±%
Independent	Neiphiu Rio	788	{{{percentage}}}	
NNO	L. Angami	609		
Margin of victory		179		
Independent hold		Swing		

=== 1964 Assembly election ===
1964 Nagaland Legislative Assembly election: Northern Angami II
Party	Candidate	Votes	%	±%
Independent	Lhousuohie	2,025	63.16%	
Independent	Thinuokielie	1,181	36.84%	
Margin of victory		844	26.33%	
Turnout		3,206	74.14%	
Registered electors		4,324		
Independent win (new seat)				

== See also ==
- List of constituencies of the Nagaland Legislative Assembly
- Angami
- Nagaland (Lok Sabha constituency)
