= Pungro–Kiphire Assembly constituency =

Legislative Assembly constituency in Nagaland State, India

Coordinates: 25.61°N 94.86°E

Pungro–Kiphire
- Constituency No. 60 for the Nagaland Legislative Assembly

Constituency details
- Country: India
- Region: Northeast India
- State: Nagaland
- District: Kiphire
- Lok Sabha constituency: Nagaland
- Established: 1974
- Total electors: 32,463
- Reservation: ST

Member of Legislative Assembly
- 14th Nagaland Legislative Assembly
- Incumbent S. Kiusumew Yimchunger
- Party: NPF
- Alliance: NDA
- Elected year: 2023

Pungro–Kiphire Assembly constituency is one of the 60 Legislative Assembly constituencies of Nagaland state in India.

It is part of Kiphire district and is reserved for candidates belonging to the Scheduled Tribes.

== Members of the Legislative Assembly ==
| Year | Member | Party |
|---|---|---|
| 1974 | T. Rothrong | United Democratic Alliance |
| 1977 | Kichingse | Independent politician |
| 1982 | T. Rothrong | Indian National Congress |
| 1987 | T. Rothrong | Indian National Congress |
| 1989 | T. Rothrong | Indian National Congress |
| 1993 | R. L. Akamba | Indian National Congress |
| 1998 | R. L. Akamba | Indian National Congress |
| 2003 | T. Torechu | Bharatiya Janata Party |
| 2008 | T. Torechu | Naga People's Front |
| 2013 | T. Torechu | Naga People's Front |
| 2018 | T. Torechu | Naga People's Front |
| 2020 by-election | T. Yangseo Sangtam | Independent politician |
| 2023 | S. Kiusumew Yimchunger | Nationalist Democratic Progressive Party |

== Election results ==
=== 2023 Assembly election ===
2023 Nagaland Legislative Assembly election: Pungro–Kiphire
| Party | Candidate | Votes | % | ±% |
|---|---|---|---|---|
| NDPP | S. Kiusumew Yimchunger | 16,098 | 53.59% | |
| RPI(A) | T. Yangseo Sangtam | 13,807 | 45.97% | |
| NOTA | Nota | 71 | 0.24% | |
| INC | T. Atsuba | 62 | 0.21% | −1.06% |
| Margin of victory | | 2,291 | 7.63% | 2.05% |
| Turnout | | 30,038 | 92.53% | 0.08% |
| Registered electors | | 32,463 | | 9.67% |
| NDPP gain from Independent | | Swing | 21.63% | |

=== 2020 Assembly by-election ===
2020 Nagaland Legislative Assembly by-election: Pungro–Kiphire
| Party | Candidate | Votes | % | ±% |
|---|---|---|---|---|
| Independent | T. Yangseo Sangtam | 8,747 | 31.96% | |
| Independent | S. Kiusumew Yimchunger | 7,220 | 26.38% | |
| BJP | Lirimong Sangtam | 5,664 | 20.70% | 16.41% |
| Independent | K. Shellumthong Yimchunger | 5,388 | 19.69% | |
| INC | Khaseo Anar | 347 | 1.27% | |
| NOTA | None of the Above | 92 | 0.34% | |
| Margin of victory | | 1,527 | 5.58% | 3.48% |
| Turnout | | 27,366 | 91.26% | 14.13% |
| Registered electors | | 29,601 | | 2.93% |
| Independent gain from NPF | | Swing | -3.80% | |

=== 2018 Assembly election ===
2018 Nagaland Legislative Assembly election: Pungro–Kiphire
| Party | Candidate | Votes | % | ±% |
|---|---|---|---|---|
| NPF | T. Torechu | 8,056 | 35.77% | −21.50% |
| JD(U) | T. Yangseo Sangtam | 7,583 | 33.67% | |
| NPP | S. K. James | 3,719 | 16.51% | |
| NCP | Lithriyem Dupongle | 1,970 | 8.75% | |
| BJP | T. Yankiu Yimchunger | 965 | 4.28% | 2.50% |
| NOTA | None of the Above | 230 | 1.02% | |
| Margin of victory | | 473 | 2.10% | −14.28% |
| Turnout | | 22,523 | 78.32% | −14.66% |
| Registered electors | | 28,757 | | −3.66% |
| NPF hold | | Swing | -21.50% | |

=== 2013 Assembly election ===
2013 Nagaland Legislative Assembly election: Pungro–Kiphire
| Party | Candidate | Votes | % | ±% |
|---|---|---|---|---|
| NPF | T. Torechu | 15,894 | 57.27% | 7.29% |
| INC | R. Tsapikiu Sangtam | 11,349 | 40.89% | 5.85% |
| BJP | J.M Makhe Yimchunger | 496 | 1.79% | −0.14% |
| Margin of victory | | 4,545 | 16.38% | 1.44% |
| Turnout | | 27,753 | 92.98% | −0.33% |
| Registered electors | | 29,848 | | 3.97% |
| NPF hold | | Swing | 7.29% | |

=== 2008 Assembly election ===
2008 Nagaland Legislative Assembly election: Pungro–Kiphire
| Party | Candidate | Votes | % | ±% |
|---|---|---|---|---|
| NPF | T. Torechu | 13,275 | 49.98% | 8.25% |
| INC | R. L. Akamba | 9,308 | 35.04% | 23.90% |
| RJD | R. Tsapikiu Sangtam | 3,691 | 13.90% | |
| BJP | Soly | 513 | 1.93% | −45.20% |
| Margin of victory | | 3,967 | 14.93% | 9.53% |
| Turnout | | 26,562 | 93.31% | −5.20% |
| Registered electors | | 28,707 | | 27.39% |
| NPF gain from BJP | | Swing | | |

=== 2003 Assembly election ===
2003 Nagaland Legislative Assembly election: Pungro–Kiphire
| Party | Candidate | Votes | % | ±% |
|---|---|---|---|---|
| BJP | T. Torechu | 10,246 | 47.13% | |
| NPF | Tsepikiu | 9,071 | 41.72% | |
| INC | R. L. Akamba | 2,423 | 11.15% | |
| Margin of victory | | 1,175 | 5.40% | |
| Turnout | | 21,740 | 98.51% | 98.51% |
| Registered electors | | 22,534 | | 9.95% |
| BJP gain from INC | | Swing | | |

=== 1998 Assembly election ===
1998 Nagaland Legislative Assembly election: Pungro–Kiphire
| Party | Candidate | Votes | % | ±% |
|---|---|---|---|---|
| INC | R. L. Akamba | Unopposed | | |
| Registered electors | | 20,495 | | 9.48% |
| INC hold | | Swing | | |

=== 1993 Assembly election ===
1993 Nagaland Legislative Assembly election: Pungro–Kiphire
| Party | Candidate | Votes | % | ±% |
|---|---|---|---|---|
| INC | R. L. Akamba | 4,891 | 29.12% | −9.47% |
| NPF | R. Sapikiu | 4,686 | 27.90% | 4.88% |
| Independent | Yasangwu | 3,801 | 22.63% | |
| Independent | Roghrong | 3,416 | 20.34% | |
| Margin of victory | | 205 | 1.22% | 1.01% |
| Turnout | | 16,794 | 89.95% | −3.93% |
| Registered electors | | 18,721 | | 80.84% |
| INC hold | | Swing | -9.47% | |

=== 1989 Assembly election ===
1989 Nagaland Legislative Assembly election: Pungro–Kiphire
| Party | Candidate | Votes | % | ±% |
|---|---|---|---|---|
| INC | T. Rothrong | 3,713 | 38.59% | −13.32% |
| Independent | T. Torechu | 3,693 | 38.38% | |
| NPF | Kipili | 2,215 | 23.02% | |
| Margin of victory | | 20 | 0.21% | −3.61% |
| Turnout | | 9,621 | 93.89% | 1.29% |
| Registered electors | | 10,352 | | 4.32% |
| INC hold | | Swing | -13.32% | |

=== 1987 Assembly election ===
1987 Nagaland Legislative Assembly election: Pungro–Kiphire
| Party | Candidate | Votes | % | ±% |
|---|---|---|---|---|
| INC | T. Rothrong | 4,732 | 51.91% | 17.78% |
| NND | T. Torechu | 4,384 | 48.09% | 27.50% |
| Margin of victory | | 348 | 3.82% | 0.87% |
| Turnout | | 9,116 | 92.59% | 25.49% |
| Registered electors | | 9,923 | | −19.64% |
| INC hold | | Swing | 17.78% | |

=== 1982 Assembly election ===
1982 Nagaland Legislative Assembly election: Pungro–Kiphire
| Party | Candidate | Votes | % | ±% |
|---|---|---|---|---|
| INC | T. Rothrong | 2,770 | 34.13% | 7.56% |
| Independent | T. Torechu | 2,531 | 31.18% | |
| NND | S. L. Akali | 1,671 | 20.59% | |
| Independent | R. Thongthong | 1,145 | 14.11% | |
| Margin of victory | | 239 | 2.94% | 1.60% |
| Turnout | | 8,117 | 67.10% | −14.17% |
| Registered electors | | 12,348 | | 69.31% |
| INC gain from Independent | | Swing | 6.21% | |

=== 1977 Assembly election ===
1977 Nagaland Legislative Assembly election: Pungro–Kiphire
| Party | Candidate | Votes | % | ±% |
|---|---|---|---|---|
| Independent | Kichingse | 1,620 | 27.91% | |
| INC | T. Rothrong | 1,542 | 26.57% | |
| UDA | Tsantsumong | 1,497 | 25.79% | −11.62% |
| Independent | P. Cheusume | 1,145 | 19.73% | |
| Margin of victory | | 78 | 1.34% | −3.93% |
| Turnout | | 5,804 | 81.27% | −0.78% |
| Registered electors | | 7,293 | | 20.75% |
| Independent gain from UDA | | Swing | -9.51% | |

=== 1974 Assembly election ===
1974 Nagaland Legislative Assembly election: Pungro–Kiphire
| Party | Candidate | Votes | % | ±% |
|---|---|---|---|---|
| UDA | T. Rothrong | 1,744 | 37.42% | |
| NNO | Kechingkam | 1,498 | 32.14% | |
| Independent | P. Cheusume | 1,419 | 30.44% | |
| Margin of victory | | 246 | 5.28% | |
| Turnout | | 4,661 | 82.05% | |
| Registered electors | | 6,040 | | |
| UDA win (new seat) | | | | |

== See also ==
- List of constituencies of the Nagaland Legislative Assembly
- Kiphire district
