= Shamator–Chessore Assembly constituency =

Legislative Assembly constituency in Nagaland State, India

Coordinates: 26.07°N 94.88°E

Shamator–Chessore
- Constituency No. 58 for the Nagaland Legislative Assembly

Constituency details
- Country: India
- Region: Northeast India
- State: Nagaland
- District: Shamator
- Lok Sabha constituency: Nagaland
- Established: 1974
- Total electors: 18,788
- Reservation: ST

Member of Legislative Assembly
- 14th Nagaland Legislative Assembly
- Incumbent Keoshu Yimchunger
- Party: NPF
- Alliance: NDA
- Elected year: 2023

Shamator–Chessore is one of the 60 Legislative Assembly constituencies of Nagaland state in India. It is part of Shamator district and is reserved for candidates belonging to the Scheduled Tribes.

== Members of the Legislative Assembly ==
Year	Member	Party
1974	P. Monokiu	Nagaland Nationalist Organisation
1977	K. Zungkum Yimchunger	United Democratic Alliance
1982	K. Zungkum Yimchunger	Naga National Democratic Party
1987	K. Zungkum Yimchunger	Naga National Democratic Party
1989	Yamukum	Naga People's Front
1993	K. Yamakam	Indian National Congress
1998	K. Yamakam	Indian National Congress
2003	K. Yamakam	Indian National Congress
2008	R. Tohanba	Naga People's Front
2013	R. Tohanba	Naga People's Front
2018	Toshi Wungtung	Nationalist Democratic Progressive Party
2021 by-election	Keoshu Yimchunger	Nationalist Democratic Progressive Party
2023	Keoshu Yimchunger	Nationalist Democratic Progressive Party

== Election results ==
=== 2023 Assembly election ===
2023 Nagaland Legislative Assembly election: Shamator–Chessore
Party	Candidate	Votes	%	±%
NDPP	Keoshu Yimchunger	9,065	56.25%	
LJP(RV)	R. Tohanba	6,770	42.01%	
NPF	H. Mukam	146	0.91%	
INC	W. Akum Yimkhiung	85	0.53%	
NOTA	Nota	49	0.30%	
Margin of victory		2,295	14.24%	
Turnout		16,115	85.77%	85.77%
Registered electors		18,788		7.38%
NDPP hold		Swing		

=== 2021 Assembly by-election ===
In the October 2021 by-election, Keoshu Yimchunger of the NDPP was unchallenged, and hence won the seat by default. The by-election was needed because of the death of the sitting member, Toshi Wungtung, on 1 July 2021.

2021 Nagaland Legislative Assembly by-election: Shamator–Chessore
Party	Candidate	Votes	%	±%
NDPP	Keoshu Yimchunger	Unopposed		
Registered electors		17,496		0.77%
NDPP hold		Swing		

=== 2018 Assembly election ===
2018 Nagaland Legislative Assembly election: Shamator–Chessore
Party	Candidate	Votes	%	±%
NDPP	Toshi Wungtung	4,311	28.79%	
NPF	R. Tohanba	4,004	26.74%	−16.39%
JD(U)	H. Mukam	3,654	24.40%	0.31%
NPP	K. Yimso Yimchunger	2,945	19.67%	
NOTA	None of the Above	61	0.41%	
Margin of victory		307	2.05%	−16.98%
Turnout		14,975	86.25%	−0.63%
Registered electors		17,363		−1.47%
NDPP gain from NPF		Swing	-14.34%	

=== 2013 Assembly election ===
2013 Nagaland Legislative Assembly election: Shamator–Chessore
Party	Candidate	Votes	%	±%
NPF	R. Tohanba	6,602	43.12%	−5.68%
JD(U)	K. Yimso Yimchunger	3,688	24.09%	
INC	Dokiu Kecham	2,638	17.23%	−19.03%
Independent	H. Mukam	2,346	15.32%	
Margin of victory		2,914	19.03%	6.50%
Turnout		15,309	86.87%	−5.51%
Registered electors		17,622		−15.16%
NPF hold		Swing	-5.68%	

=== 2008 Assembly election ===
2008 Nagaland Legislative Assembly election: Shamator–Chessore
Party	Candidate	Votes	%	±%
NPF	R. Tohanba	9,315	48.80%	19.79%
INC	K. Yamakam	6,922	36.26%	5.77%
BJP	M. Rokkimong	2,301	12.05%	3.46%
JD(S)	Thongthong	652	3.42%	
Margin of victory		2,393	12.54%	11.06%
Turnout		19,088	92.38%	−6.16%
Registered electors		20,772		34.08%
NPF gain from INC		Swing		

=== 2003 Assembly election ===
2003 Nagaland Legislative Assembly election: Shamator–Chessore
Party	Candidate	Votes	%	±%
INC	K. Yamakam	4,602	30.49%	
NPF	Zungkum	4,379	29.01%	
Independent	R. Tohanba	3,218	21.32%	
NDM	W. Akum Yimkhiung	1,597	10.58%	
BJP	Rokkimong	1,297	8.59%	
Margin of victory		223	1.48%	
Turnout		15,093	98.54%	98.54%
Registered electors		15,492		14.57%
INC hold		Swing		

=== 1998 Assembly election ===
1998 Nagaland Legislative Assembly election: Shamator–Chessore
Party	Candidate	Votes	%	±%
INC	K. Yamakam	Unopposed		
Registered electors		13,522		15.49%
INC hold		Swing		

=== 1993 Assembly election ===
1993 Nagaland Legislative Assembly election: Shamator–Chessore
Party	Candidate	Votes	%	±%
INC	K. Yamakam	5,121	44.74%	−0.36%
NPF	Y. Throngshi	3,226	28.18%	−26.72%
Independent	Z. Akum	3,100	27.08%	
Margin of victory		1,895	16.55%	6.76%
Turnout		11,447	98.04%	4.78%
Registered electors		11,708		56.32%
INC gain from NPF		Swing	-10.16%	

=== 1989 Assembly election ===
1989 Nagaland Legislative Assembly election: Shamator–Chessore
Party	Candidate	Votes	%	±%
NPF	Yamukum	3,816	54.90%	
INC	K. Zungkum Yimchunger	3,135	45.10%	17.60%
Margin of victory		681	9.80%	5.70%
Turnout		6,951	93.26%	−0.13%
Registered electors		7,490		0.11%
NPF gain from NND		Swing	23.30%	

=== 1987 Assembly election ===
1987 Nagaland Legislative Assembly election: Shamator–Chessore
Party	Candidate	Votes	%	±%
NND	K. Zungkum Yimchunger	2,189	31.60%	−13.34%
INC	Yamukum	1,905	27.50%	−7.35%
Independent	Throngshe	1,196	17.27%	
Independent	K. M. Caming	1,060	15.30%	
NPP	Thasankiu	577	8.33%	
Margin of victory		284	4.10%	−5.99%
Turnout		6,927	93.38%	19.83%
Registered electors		7,482		−25.27%
NND hold		Swing	-13.34%	

=== 1982 Assembly election ===
1982 Nagaland Legislative Assembly election: Shamator–Chessore
Party	Candidate	Votes	%	±%
NND	K. Zungkum Yimchunger	3,255	44.94%	
INC	Yamakan Kichan	2,524	34.85%	−5.24%
Independent	K. M. Caming	1,464	20.21%	
Margin of victory		731	10.09%	6.95%
Turnout		7,243	73.55%	−17.16%
Registered electors		10,012		34.03%
NND gain from UDA		Swing	1.71%	

=== 1977 Assembly election ===
1977 Nagaland Legislative Assembly election: Shamator–Chessore
Party	Candidate	Votes	%	±%
UDA	K. Zungkum Yimchunger	2,863	43.23%	19.09%
INC	Yamakan Kichan	2,655	40.09%	
Independent	Muzhi	891	13.45%	
Independent	Thongthong	214	3.23%	
Margin of victory		208	3.14%	−23.46%
Turnout		6,623	90.71%	22.17%
Registered electors		7,470		0.67%
UDA gain from NNO		Swing	-8.00%	

=== 1974 Assembly election ===
1974 Nagaland Legislative Assembly election: Shamator–Chessore
Party	Candidate	Votes	%	±%
NNO	P. Monokiu	2,473	51.23%	
Independent	K. Zungkum Yimchunger	1,189	24.63%	
UDA	K. M. Caming	1,165	24.14%	
Margin of victory		1,284	26.60%	
Turnout		4,827	68.54%	
Registered electors		7,420		
NNO win (new seat)				

== See also ==
- List of constituencies of the Nagaland Legislative Assembly
- Tuensang district
