= Angetyongpang Assembly constituency =

Legislative Assembly constituency in Nagaland State, India

Coordinates: 26.4°N 94.6°E

Angetyongpang
- Constituency No. 24 for the Nagaland Legislative Assembly

Constituency details
- Country: India
- Region: Northeast India
- State: Nagaland
- District: Mokokchung
- Lok Sabha constituency: Nagaland
- Established: 1974
- Total electors: 17,946
- Reservation: ST

Member of Legislative Assembly
- 14th Nagaland Legislative Assembly
- Incumbent Tongpang Ozüküm
- Party: NPF
- Alliance: NDA
- Elected year: 2023

Angetyongpang is one of the 60 Legislative Assembly constituencies of Nagaland state in India.

It is part of Mokokchung district and is reserved for candidates belonging to the Scheduled Tribes.

== Members of the Legislative Assembly ==
Year	Member	Party
1974	Sentichuba	United Democratic Alliance
1977	Sentichuba	United Democratic Alliance
1982	Sentichuba	Naga National Democratic Party
1987	Akumbenba	National People's Party
1989	S. Lima	Indian National Congress
1993	Tongpang Ozüküm	Naga People's Front
1998	Tongpang Ozüküm	Indian National Congress
2003	Jonshilemba	Independent politician
2008	Tongpang Ozüküm	Indian National Congress
2013	S. Chuba Longkumer	Independent politician
2018	Tongpang Ozüküm	Independent politician
2023	Tongpang Ozüküm	Nationalist Democratic Progressive Party

== Election results ==
=== 2023 Assembly election ===
2023 Nagaland Legislative Assembly election: Angetyongpang
Party	Candidate	Votes	%	±%
NDPP	Tongpang Ozüküm	8,046	51.14%	21.90%
Independent	Er. K. Wati	5,826	37.03%	
NPP	S. Maongkaba Ozukum	1,842	11.71%	
NOTA	Nota	20	0.13%	
Margin of victory		2,220	14.11%	6.51%
Turnout		15,734	87.67%	7.33%
Registered electors		17,946		15.29%
NDPP gain from Independent		Swing	14.30%	

=== 2018 Assembly election ===
2018 Nagaland Legislative Assembly election: Angetyongpang
Party	Candidate	Votes	%	±%
Independent	Tongpang Ozüküm	4,607	36.84%	
NDPP	Alemtemshi Jamir	3,657	29.24%	
NPF	S. Chuba Longkumer	3,353	26.81%	−10.30%
JD(U)	Sashimar	617	4.93%	
NCP	Supongwati	223	1.78%	
NOTA	None of the Above	49	0.39%	
Margin of victory		950	7.60%	4.58%
Turnout		12,506	80.34%	−11.56%
Registered electors		15,566		4.76%
Independent hold		Swing	-3.29%	

=== 2013 Assembly election ===
2013 Nagaland Legislative Assembly election: Angetyongpang
Party	Candidate	Votes	%	±%
Independent	S. Chuba Longkumer	5,480	40.13%	
NPF	Sashimar	5,068	37.11%	
INC	Jongshilemba	2,396	17.55%	−36.39%
Independent	Meren Pongener	689	5.05%	
Margin of victory		412	3.02%	−5.00%
Turnout		13,656	91.90%	7.95%
Registered electors		14,859		−18.97%
Independent gain from INC		Swing	-13.81%	

=== 2008 Assembly election ===
2008 Nagaland Legislative Assembly election: Angetyongpang
Party	Candidate	Votes	%	±%
INC	Tongpang Ozüküm	8,304	53.94%	34.47%
RJD	Jongshilemba	7,069	45.91%	
BJP	Supongwati	160	1.04%	−2.84%
Margin of victory		1,235	8.02%	−14.67%
Turnout		15,396	84.70%	−3.48%
Registered electors		18,338		48.99%
INC gain from Independent		Swing	11.77%	

=== 2003 Assembly election ===
2003 Nagaland Legislative Assembly election: Angetyongpang
Party	Candidate	Votes	%	±%
Independent	Jonshilemba	4,535	42.16%	
INC	Tongpang Ozüküm	2,094	19.47%	
JD(U)	Aosanen	1,858	17.27%	
SAP	S. Lima	1,425	13.25%	
NPF	Onenchuba	427	3.97%	
BJP	A. Imtizulu	417	3.88%	
Margin of victory		2,441	22.69%	
Turnout		10,756	87.44%	−11.57%
Registered electors		12,308		10.64%
Independent gain from INC		Swing	3.88%	

=== 1998 Assembly election ===
1998 Nagaland Legislative Assembly election: Angetyongpang
Party	Candidate	Votes	%	±%
INC	Tongpang Ozüküm	Unopposed		
Registered electors		11,124		−5.41%
INC gain from NPF		Swing		

=== 1993 Assembly election ===
1993 Nagaland Legislative Assembly election: Angetyongpang
Party	Candidate	Votes	%	±%
NPF	Tongpang Ozüküm	4,433	38.28%	18.55%
INC	S. Limatemjen	4,037	34.86%	−14.36%
Independent	Tsukjemwati	2,575	22.24%	
Independent	O. Temjen	535	4.62%	
Margin of victory		396	3.42%	−15.99%
Turnout		11,580	99.01%	5.95%
Registered electors		11,760		39.68%
NPF gain from INC		Swing	-10.94%	

=== 1989 Assembly election ===
1989 Nagaland Legislative Assembly election: Angetyongpang
Party	Candidate	Votes	%	±%
INC	S. Lima	3,837	49.22%	22.26%
Independent	Temsu Ao	2,324	29.81%	
NPF	Tongpang Ozüküm	1,538	19.73%	
Independent	Lanutoshi	97	1.24%	
Margin of victory		1,513	19.41%	17.33%
Turnout		7,796	93.05%	0.52%
Registered electors		8,419		1.08%
INC gain from NPP		Swing	20.19%	

=== 1987 Assembly election ===
1987 Nagaland Legislative Assembly election: Angetyongpang
Party	Candidate	Votes	%	±%
NPP	Akumbenba	2,227	29.03%	
INC	S. Lima	2,068	26.96%	10.19%
NND	Tongpang Ozüküm	1,890	24.64%	−19.70%
Independent	Jongshilemba	1,456	18.98%	
Independent	Lunutoshi	31	0.40%	
Margin of victory		159	2.07%	−3.76%
Turnout		7,672	92.53%	22.19%
Registered electors		8,329		−12.78%
NPP gain from NND		Swing	-15.31%	

=== 1982 Assembly election ===
1982 Nagaland Legislative Assembly election: Angetyongpang
Party	Candidate	Votes	%	±%
NND	Sentichuba	2,957	44.33%	
Independent	Akumbenba	2,568	38.50%	
INC	Meyichizung	1,118	16.76%	
Independent	Limameren	27	0.40%	
Margin of victory		389	5.83%	−10.13%
Turnout		6,670	70.34%	−17.36%
Registered electors		9,549		71.87%
NND gain from UDA		Swing	-13.65%	

=== 1977 Assembly election ===
1977 Nagaland Legislative Assembly election: Angetyongpang
Party	Candidate	Votes	%	±%
UDA	Sentichuba	2,783	57.98%	13.89%
Independent	Limasangwa	2,017	42.02%	
Margin of victory		766	15.96%	2.99%
Turnout		4,800	87.71%	12.10%
Registered electors		5,556		−17.91%
UDA hold		Swing	13.89%	

=== 1974 Assembly election ===
1974 Nagaland Legislative Assembly election: Angetyongpang
Party	Candidate	Votes	%	±%
UDA	Sentichuba	2,213	44.09%	
Independent	Limasangwa	1,562	31.12%	
NNO	Imkongsungit	1,244	24.79%	
Margin of victory		651	12.97%	
Turnout		5,019	75.61%	
Registered electors		6,768		
UDA win (new seat)				

== See also ==
- List of constituencies of the Nagaland Legislative Assembly
- Mokokchung district
