= Pughoboto Assembly constituency =

Legislative Assembly constituency in Nagaland State, India

Coordinates: 25.92°N 94.28°E

Pughoboto
- Constituency No. 13 for the Nagaland Legislative Assembly

Constituency details
- Country: India
- Region: Northeast India
- State: Nagaland
- District: Zünheboto
- Lok Sabha constituency: Nagaland
- Established: 1964
- Total electors: 15,803
- Reservation: ST

Member of Legislative Assembly
- 14th Nagaland Legislative Assembly
- Incumbent Sukhato A. Sema
- Party: LJP(RV)
- Alliance: NDA
- Elected year: 2023

Pughoboto is one of the 60 Legislative Assembly constituencies of Nagaland state in India.

It is part of Zünheboto district and is reserved for candidates belonging to the Scheduled Tribes.

== Members of the Legislative Assembly ==
| Year | Member | Party |
|---|---|---|
| 1964 | Kiyelho Sema | Independent politician |
| 1969 | Hosheto Sema | Independent politician |
| 1974 | Huska Sumi | Independent politician |
| 1977 | Huska Sumi | United Democratic Alliance |
| 1982 | Huska Sumi | Independent politician |
| 1987 | Joshua Achumi | Indian National Congress |
| 1989 | Joshua Achumi | Naga People's Front |
| 1993 | Huska Sumi | Naga People's Front |
| 1998 | Joshua Achumi | Indian National Congress |
| 2003 | Huska Sumi | Janata Dal |
| 2008 | Joshua Achumi | Indian National Congress |
| 2013 | Y. Vikheho Swu | Naga People's Front |
| 2018 | Y. Vikheho Swu | Naga People's Front |
| 2023 | Dr. Sukhato A. Sema | Lok Janshakti Party |

== Election results ==
=== 2023 Assembly election ===
2023 Nagaland Legislative Assembly election: Pughoboto
| Party | Candidate | Votes | % | ±% |
|---|---|---|---|---|
| LJP(RV) | Sukhato A. Sema | 7,808 | 52.80% | |
| NDPP | Y. Vikheho Swu | 6,958 | 47.05% | |
| NOTA | Nota | 23 | 0.16% | |
| Margin of victory | | 850 | 5.75% | 5.19% |
| Turnout | | 14,789 | 93.58% | 0.27% |
| Registered electors | | 15,803 | | 17.79% |
| LJP(RV) gain from NPF | | Swing | 2.81% | |

=== 2018 Assembly election ===
2018 Nagaland Legislative Assembly election: Pughoboto
| Party | Candidate | Votes | % | ±% |
|---|---|---|---|---|
| NPF | Y. Vikheho Swu | 6,258 | 49.99% | −9.18% |
| BJP | Sukhato A. Sema | 6,188 | 49.43% | |
| Independent | Kheyihe Zimomi | 56 | 0.45% | |
| NOTA | None of the Above | 17 | 0.14% | |
| Margin of victory | | 70 | 0.56% | −18.20% |
| Turnout | | 12,519 | 93.31% | −1.41% |
| Registered electors | | 13,416 | | 4.31% |
| NPF hold | | Swing | -9.18% | |

=== 2013 Assembly election ===
2013 Nagaland Legislative Assembly election: Pughoboto
| Party | Candidate | Votes | % | ±% |
|---|---|---|---|---|
| NPF | Y. Vikheho Swu | 7,208 | 59.16% | 17.14% |
| INC | Joshua Achumi | 4,922 | 40.40% | −4.45% |
| Margin of victory | | 2,286 | 18.76% | 15.94% |
| Turnout | | 12,183 | 94.72% | 4.11% |
| Registered electors | | 12,862 | | −23.73% |
| NPF gain from INC | | Swing | 14.32% | |

=== 2008 Assembly election ===
2008 Nagaland Legislative Assembly election: Pughoboto
| Party | Candidate | Votes | % | ±% |
|---|---|---|---|---|
| INC | Joshua Achumi | 6,853 | 44.85% | 5.45% |
| NPF | Y. Vikheho Swu | 6,421 | 42.02% | 37.34% |
| Independent | Huska Sumi | 2,215 | 14.50% | |
| Margin of victory | | 432 | 2.83% | −7.05% |
| Turnout | | 15,281 | 91.85% | 5.16% |
| Registered electors | | 16,864 | | 23.55% |
| INC gain from JD(U) | | Swing | -4.43% | |

=== 2003 Assembly election ===
2003 Nagaland Legislative Assembly election: Pughoboto
| Party | Candidate | Votes | % | ±% |
|---|---|---|---|---|
| JD(U) | Huska Sumi | 5,745 | 49.28% | |
| INC | Joshua Achumi | 4,593 | 39.40% | |
| BJP | Visheto | 775 | 6.65% | |
| NPF | Kashito | 545 | 4.67% | |
| Margin of victory | | 1,152 | 9.88% | |
| Turnout | | 11,658 | 85.45% | −3.37% |
| Registered electors | | 13,650 | | 9.28% |
| JD(U) gain from INC | | Swing | 11.88% | |

=== 1998 Assembly election ===
1998 Nagaland Legislative Assembly election: Pughoboto
| Party | Candidate | Votes | % | ±% |
|---|---|---|---|---|
| INC | Joshua Achumi | Unopposed | | |
| Registered electors | | 12,491 | | 21.46% |
| INC gain from NPF | | Swing | | |

=== 1993 Assembly election ===
1993 Nagaland Legislative Assembly election: Pughoboto
| Party | Candidate | Votes | % | ±% |
|---|---|---|---|---|
| NPF | Huska Sumi | 3,395 | 37.40% | −2.81% |
| Independent | Joshua Sema | 3,239 | 35.68% | |
| INC | Shikaho Chishi | 2,443 | 26.91% | 1.89% |
| Margin of victory | | 156 | 1.72% | −3.72% |
| Turnout | | 9,077 | 88.82% | −2.67% |
| Registered electors | | 10,284 | | 57.37% |
| NPF hold | | Swing | -2.81% | |

=== 1989 Assembly election ===
1989 Nagaland Legislative Assembly election: Pughoboto
| Party | Candidate | Votes | % | ±% |
|---|---|---|---|---|
| NPF | Joshua Achumi | 2,386 | 40.21% | |
| NPP | Huska Sumi | 2,063 | 34.77% | −5.51% |
| INC | Shikaho Chishi | 1,485 | 25.03% | −18.05% |
| Margin of victory | | 323 | 5.44% | 2.64% |
| Turnout | | 5,934 | 91.49% | −3.49% |
| Registered electors | | 6,535 | | 6.16% |
| NPF gain from INC | | Swing | -2.87% | |

=== 1987 Assembly election ===
1987 Nagaland Legislative Assembly election: Pughoboto
| Party | Candidate | Votes | % | ±% |
|---|---|---|---|---|
| INC | Joshua Achumi | 2,502 | 43.08% | 9.62% |
| NPP | Huska Sumi | 2,339 | 40.27% | |
| NND | L. Ghoshito Yeptho | 967 | 16.65% | 2.35% |
| Margin of victory | | 163 | 2.81% | −15.99% |
| Turnout | | 5,808 | 94.98% | 10.00% |
| Registered electors | | 6,156 | | −28.09% |
| INC gain from Independent | | Swing | -9.17% | |

=== 1982 Assembly election ===
1982 Nagaland Legislative Assembly election: Pughoboto
| Party | Candidate | Votes | % | ±% |
|---|---|---|---|---|
| Independent | Huska Sumi | 3,728 | 52.25% | |
| INC | Zhutovi | 2,387 | 33.45% | |
| NND | Kiyelho Sema | 1,020 | 14.30% | |
| Margin of victory | | 1,341 | 18.79% | 2.71% |
| Turnout | | 7,135 | 84.98% | −2.85% |
| Registered electors | | 8,561 | | 32.58% |
| Independent gain from UDA | | Swing | -5.80% | |

=== 1977 Assembly election ===
1977 Nagaland Legislative Assembly election: Pughoboto
| Party | Candidate | Votes | % | ±% |
|---|---|---|---|---|
| UDA | Huska Sumi | 3,218 | 58.04% | 40.75% |
| Independent | Atovi Sema | 2,326 | 41.96% | |
| Margin of victory | | 892 | 16.09% | −4.02% |
| Turnout | | 5,544 | 87.83% | 3.36% |
| Registered electors | | 6,457 | | 7.47% |
| UDA gain from Independent | | Swing | 6.64% | |

=== 1974 Assembly election ===
1974 Nagaland Legislative Assembly election: Pughoboto
| Party | Candidate | Votes | % | ±% |
|---|---|---|---|---|
| Independent | Huska Sumi | 2,536 | 51.41% | |
| NNO | Hosheto Sema | 1,544 | 31.30% | −2.10% |
| UDA | Atovi Sema | 853 | 17.29% | |
| Margin of victory | | 992 | 20.11% | 12.38% |
| Turnout | | 4,933 | 84.47% | 5.76% |
| Registered electors | | 6,008 | | 12.81% |
| Independent hold | | Swing | 10.28% | |

=== 1969 Assembly election ===
1969 Nagaland Legislative Assembly election: Pughoboto
| Party | Candidate | Votes | % | ±% |
|---|---|---|---|---|
| Independent | Hosheto Sema | 1,724 | 41.13% | |
| NNO | Kiyelho Sema | 1,400 | 33.40% | |
| Independent | Yeghoto | 638 | 15.22% | |
| UDF | Inaho | 430 | 10.26% | |
| Margin of victory | | 324 | 7.73% | |
| Turnout | | 4,192 | 78.71% | 78.71% |
| Registered electors | | 5,326 | | 25.11% |
| Independent hold | | Swing | | |

=== 1964 Assembly election ===
1964 Nagaland Legislative Assembly election: Pughoboto
| Party | Candidate | Votes | % | ±% |
|---|---|---|---|---|
| Independent | Kiyelho Sema | Unopposed | | |
| Registered electors | | 4,257 | | |
| Independent win (new seat) | | | | |

== See also ==
- List of constituencies of the Nagaland Legislative Assembly
- Zunheboto district
