= Tongpang Ozüküm =

Indian politician

Member of the Nagaland Legislative Assembly

Tongpang Ozüküm (born 1980) is an Indian politician from Nagaland. He is a two-time member of the Nagaland Legislative Assembly from Angetyongpang Assembly constituency. He was a Minister of Housing, Mechanical and Road & Bridges (April 2018- July 2019) in the Fourth Neiphiu Rio ministry from 2018. In 2023, he was appointed as an adviser to the Water Resources Department.

== Early life and education ==
Ozukum is from Angetyongpang, Mokokchung District, Nagaland. He is the son of late Temsulepden. He completed his Bachelor's degree in arts in 2003 at Kohima College, which is affiliated with Nagaland University. His wife is in the government service in the education department.

Ozukum served as President of the Naga Students' Federation from 2013 to 2015

== Career ==
Ozukum first became an MLA winning the 2018 Nagaland Legislative Assembly election as an independent candidate from the Angetyongpang Assembly constituency. He polled 4,607 and defeated his nearest rival, Alemtemshi Jamir of the NDPP, by a margin of 450 votes. In 2023, he joined the Nationalist Democratic Progressive Party and retained the seat in the 2023 Nagaland Legislative Assembly election representing the NDPP. In 2023, he polled 8,046 votes and defeated his nearest rival, K. Wati, an independent candidate, by a margin of 2,220 votes.
