= NPF =

NPF may refer to:

- Naga People's Front, a regional political party in Nagaland and Manipur, India
- National Park Foundation
- The National Patriotic Front (Zimbabwe), a political party in Zimbabwe
- The National Policy Forum of the British Labour Party
- The National Press Foundation
- National Pro Fastpitch, an American professional women's softball league
- NPF (firewall), NetBSD's new stateful packet filter
- The Network Processing Forum
- National Progressive Front (Iraq)
- National Progressive Front (Syria)
- The National Psoriasis Foundation
- Neopentylene fluorophosphate, an acetylcholinesterase inhibitor
- Neuropsychiatric Forum
- Nigeria Police Force
- Nineveh Plain Forces, a military organization formed in 2015 by indigenous Assyrian Christians in Iraq
- North Preston's Finest
- New Popular Front, a left-wing alliance in France
