= T. Torechu =

Indian teacher and politician (c.1948–2019)

Nagaland Legislative Assembly
- In office 2003 – 16 December 2019
- Preceded by: R. L. Akamba
- Succeeded by: T. Yangseo Sangtam
- Constituency: Pungro Kiphire

Personal details
- Born: c. 1948
- Died: 16 December 2019 (aged 71)
- Party: Naga People's Front

T. Torechu (c. 1948 – 16 December 2019) was an Indian teacher and politician from Nagaland belonging to Naga People's Front. He was a legislator of the Nagaland Legislative Assembly.

== Early life ==
Torechu did his completed his school education from Pungro Government School and GHS Tuensang. He went on to complete his college studies from Fazl Ali College in Mokokchung. He later, took up a job as a government school teacher.

== Political life ==
He was elected as a legislator of the Nagaland Legislative Assembly from Pungro Kiphire in 2003 as a Bharatiya Janata Party candidate. Later, he joined Naga People's Front. He was also elected from this constituency in 2008.

Torechu won the 2013 Nagaland Legislative Assembly election as the sitting NPF candidate by defeating his nearest rival R. Tsapikiu Sangtam of the Indian National Congress (INC) by a margin of 4545 votes. Torechu garnered 57.30% of the total votes polled. He was elected for the fourth time from the same constituency in 2018.

== Death ==
Torechu died on 16 December 2019 at the age of 71. He was survived by his wife, six sons, and a daughter. His funeral was conducted at Pungro local ground.
