= Seyochung–Sitimi Assembly constituency =

Legislative Assembly constituency in Nagaland State, India

Coordinates: 25.9°N 94.64°E

Seyochung–Sitimi
- Constituency No. 59 for the Nagaland Legislative Assembly

Constituency details
- Country: India
- Region: Northeast India
- State: Nagaland
- District: Kiphire
- Lok Sabha constituency: Nagaland
- Established: 1974
- Total electors: 24,166
- Reservation: ST

Member of Legislative Assembly
- 14th Nagaland Legislative Assembly
- Incumbent C. Kipili Sangtam
- Party: NPP
- Alliance: NDA
- Elected year: 2023

Seyochung–Sitimi is one of the 60 Legislative Assembly constituencies of Nagaland state in India.

It is part of Kiphire district and is reserved for candidates belonging to the Scheduled Tribes.

== Members of the Legislative Assembly ==
Year	Member	Party
1974	Zhetovi	Independent politician
1977	Yopikyu Thongtsar	United Democratic Alliance
1982	Yopikyu Thongtsar	Naga National Democratic Party
1987	Yopikyu Thongtsar	Naga National Democratic Party
1989	S. Sethricho Sangtam	Indian National Congress
1993	S. Sethricho Sangtam	Indian National Congress
1998	S. Sethricho Sangtam	Indian National Congress
2003	C. Kipili Sangtam	Nationalist Democratic Movement
2008	C. Kipili Sangtam	Independent politician
2013	C. Kipili Sangtam	Naga People's Front
2018	V. Kashiho Sangtam	Bharatiya Janata Party
2023	C. Kipili Sangtam	National People's Party

== Election results ==
=== 2023 Assembly election ===
2023 Nagaland Legislative Assembly election: Seyochung–Sitimi
Party	Candidate	Votes	%	±%
NPP	C. Kipili Sangtam	11,694	51.42%	
BJP	V. Kashiho Sangtam	10,962	48.21%	−4.79%
NOTA	Nota	66	0.29%	
INC	Khaseo Sangtam	18	0.08%	
Margin of victory		732	3.22%	−3.05%
Turnout		22,740	94.10%	8.80%
Registered electors		24,166		11.14%
NPP gain from BJP		Swing	-1.57%	

=== 2018 Assembly election ===
2018 Nagaland Legislative Assembly election: Seyochung–Sitimi
Party	Candidate	Votes	%	±%
BJP	V. Kashiho Sangtam	9,830	53.00%	52.62%
NPF	C. Kipili Sangtam	8,668	46.73%	−10.90%
NOTA	None of the Above	50	0.27%	
Margin of victory		1,162	6.26%	−9.40%
Turnout		18,548	85.30%	−12.65%
Registered electors		21,744		−1.85%
BJP gain from NPF		Swing	-4.64%	

=== 2013 Assembly election ===
2013 Nagaland Legislative Assembly election: Seyochung–Sitimi
Party	Candidate	Votes	%	±%
NPF	C. Kipili Sangtam	12,507	57.63%	41.72%
INC	Tsasepi Sangtam	9,108	41.97%	9.81%
BJP	Lingko Sangtam	81	0.37%	−11.41%
Margin of victory		3,399	15.66%	9.47%
Turnout		21,701	97.96%	1.68%
Registered electors		22,154		1.55%
NPF gain from Independent		Swing	19.29%	

=== 2008 Assembly election ===
2008 Nagaland Legislative Assembly election: Seyochung–Sitimi
Party	Candidate	Votes	%	±%
Independent	C. Kipili Sangtam	8,054	38.35%	
INC	Sethricho Shihote	6,754	32.16%	1.82%
NPF	L. Tsanio Sangtam	3,343	15.92%	11.51%
BJP	Kiheto	2,474	11.78%	10.85%
Independent	Chothrongba Sangtam	271	1.29%	
RJD	T. Thsapongkyu Sangtam	200	0.95%	
Margin of victory		1,300	6.19%	−27.80%
Turnout		21,003	96.70%	−3.23%
Registered electors		21,816		33.09%
Independent gain from NDM		Swing	-25.98%	

=== 2003 Assembly election ===
2003 Nagaland Legislative Assembly election: Seyochung–Sitimi
Party	Candidate	Votes	%	±%
NDM	C. Kipili Sangtam	10,476	64.33%	
INC	S. Sethricho Sangtam	4,940	30.33%	−21.53%
NPF	Chothrongba Sangtam	718	4.41%	
BJP	P. Lipongkyu Sangtam	152	0.93%	
Margin of victory		5,536	33.99%	30.26%
Turnout		16,286	99.51%	2.46%
Registered electors		16,392		12.01%
NDM gain from INC		Swing	8.60%	

=== 1998 Assembly election ===
1998 Nagaland Legislative Assembly election: Seyochung–Sitimi
Party	Candidate	Votes	%	±%
INC	S. Sethricho Sangtam	7,337	51.87%	−3.86%
Independent	Kipili	6,809	48.13%	
Margin of victory		528	3.73%	−7.71%
Turnout		14,146	97.04%	14.03%
Registered electors		14,635		10.17%
INC hold		Swing	-3.86%	

=== 1993 Assembly election ===
1993 Nagaland Legislative Assembly election: Seyochung–Sitimi
Party	Candidate	Votes	%	±%
INC	S. Sethricho Sangtam	6,130	55.72%	0.23%
NPF	C. Kipili Sangtam	4,871	44.28%	−0.23%
Margin of victory		1,259	11.44%	0.46%
Turnout		11,001	83.01%	−6.84%
Registered electors		13,284		76.51%
INC hold		Swing	0.23%	

=== 1989 Assembly election ===
1989 Nagaland Legislative Assembly election: Seyochung–Sitimi
Party	Candidate	Votes	%	±%
INC	S. Sethricho Sangtam	3,732	55.49%	13.63%
NPF	Yopikyu Thongtsar	2,993	44.51%	
Margin of victory		739	10.99%	−2.06%
Turnout		6,725	89.85%	−0.57%
Registered electors		7,526		0.27%
INC gain from NND		Swing	0.58%	

=== 1987 Assembly election ===
1987 Nagaland Legislative Assembly election: Seyochung–Sitimi
Party	Candidate	Votes	%	±%
NND	Yopikyu Thongtsar	3,695	54.91%	14.37%
INC	S. Sethricho Sangtam	2,817	41.86%	8.93%
NPP	Akhai	217	3.22%	
Margin of victory		878	13.05%	5.45%
Turnout		6,729	90.42%	20.28%
Registered electors		7,506		−36.02%
NND hold		Swing	14.37%	

=== 1982 Assembly election ===
1982 Nagaland Legislative Assembly election: Seyochung–Sitimi
Party	Candidate	Votes	%	±%
NND	Yopikyu Thongtsar	3,290	40.54%	
INC	L. Kichingso	2,673	32.93%	11.27%
Independent	N. Zhetovi Sema	2,153	26.53%	
Margin of victory		617	7.60%	−11.94%
Turnout		8,116	70.14%	−16.90%
Registered electors		11,732		50.80%
NND gain from UDA		Swing	-8.40%	

=== 1977 Assembly election ===
1977 Nagaland Legislative Assembly election: Seyochung–Sitimi
Party	Candidate	Votes	%	±%
UDA	Yopikyu Thongtsar	3,236	48.93%	30.79%
Independent	Kheshito	1,944	29.40%	
INC	N. Zhetovi Sema	1,433	21.67%	
Margin of victory		1,292	19.54%	10.71%
Turnout		6,613	87.04%	4.68%
Registered electors		7,780		12.20%
UDA gain from Independent		Swing	15.52%	

=== 1974 Assembly election ===
1974 Nagaland Legislative Assembly election: Seyochung–Sitimi
Party	Candidate	Votes	%	±%
Independent	Zhetovi	1,854	33.41%	
NNO	Kichingse	1,364	24.58%	
Independent	Yopikyu Thongtsar	1,324	23.86%	
UDA	Kheshito	1,007	18.15%	
Margin of victory		490	8.83%	
Turnout		5,549	82.36%	
Registered electors		6,934		
Independent win (new seat)				

== See also ==
- List of constituencies of the Nagaland Legislative Assembly
- Kiphire district
