= Rising People's Party =

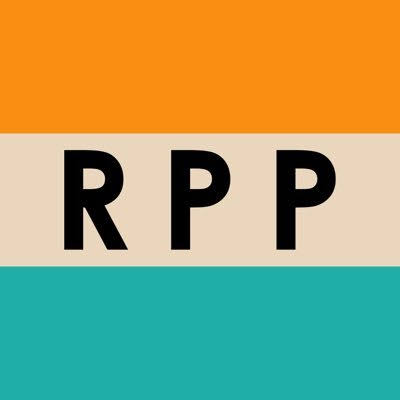
Nagaland

The Rising People's Party (RPP) was a political party of Nagaland, India founded by Joel Naga in 2021. It was dissolved in July 2026 following its merger with the Naga People's Front. The motto of the party is "For Freedom and Democracy". The party seeks autonomy and federal status for Nagaland. RPP supported S. Supongmeren Jamir of Indian National Congress during the 2024 Lok Sabha election, and the Party is allied with the Congress party. In the 2023 Legislative Assembly election, the party fielded a single candidate in Tseminyu district. In 2024, the party indicated support for maintaining the free movement regime and opposed the construction of fencing along the India–Myanmar border as divisive for ethnic groups of the Northeast.
