= Democratic Progressive Party (Nagaland) =

Former political party in India

Democratic Progressive Party (DPP) was a former regional political party in the Indian state of Nagaland.

In October 2017, DPP was renamed as Nationalist Democratic Progressive Party (NDPP).
