= Angami =

Angami may refer to:

== People and culture ==
- Angami people, an ethnic group of the Naga people in Northeastern India
- Angami language
  - Angami Naga Sign Language
  - Angami–Pochuri languages
- Angami name

== Other uses ==
- Angami Public Organization
- Angami Women Organization

== See also ==
- Angami Baptist Church Council
