= Nagaland Congress =

Nagaland Congress is a regional political party in the Indian state of Nagaland.

The party was founded in 2016 as a splinter group of the Indian National Congress.

Nagaland Congress is planning to rename the party as Nagaland Reformation Party.

In 2018 February, the party merged with National People's Party (NPP).
