= Noke Wangnao =

Indian politician (1937–2023)

Member of the Nagaland Legislative Assembly
- In office 2013–2023
- Preceded by: Lanpha
- Succeeded by: Wangpang Konyak

Personal details
- Born: 1937
- Died: 28 August 2023 (aged 86) Chümoukedima, Nagaland, India
- Party: Nationalist Democratic Progressive Party (2018–2023); Naga People's Front (2003–2018)
- Parent: Monyao (father)

Noke Wangnao (1937 – 28 August 2023), also known as Papa Noke, was an Indian politician from Nagaland. He was elected to the Nagaland Legislative Assembly nine times from the Tapi Assembly constituency in 1974, 1977, 1982, 1987, 1989, 2003, 2013, 2018, and 2023. He had served as minister of various departments in the Nagaland Legislative Assembly and also as the Nagaland chief minister's advisor on social welfare.

== Death ==
Wangnao died at Chümoukedima's Christian Institute of Health Sciences and Research on 28 August 2023, at the age of 86.
