= Keoshu Yimchunger =

Indian politician

Member of Nagaland Legislative Assembly
- Incumbent
- Assumed office 21 October 2021
- Preceded by: Toshi Wungtung
- Constituency: Shamator–Chessore

Personal details
- Born: 16 July 1977 (age 48) Tuensang District
- Occupation: Government Primary School teacher (1997–2021)

Keoshu Yimchunger is an Indian politician from Nagaland. Since October 2021, he has represented the Shamator–Chessore Assembly constituency.

== Political life ==
Yimchunger first won the Shamator–Chessore seat unopposed in the October 2021 by elections. He was re-elected in the 2023 Nagaland Legislative Assembly election from the same seat.

== Personal life ==
Keoshu was born on 16 July 1977 in Tuensang District. He served as a Government Primary School teacher from 1997 to 2021.
