= Temjen Imna Along =

Indian politician

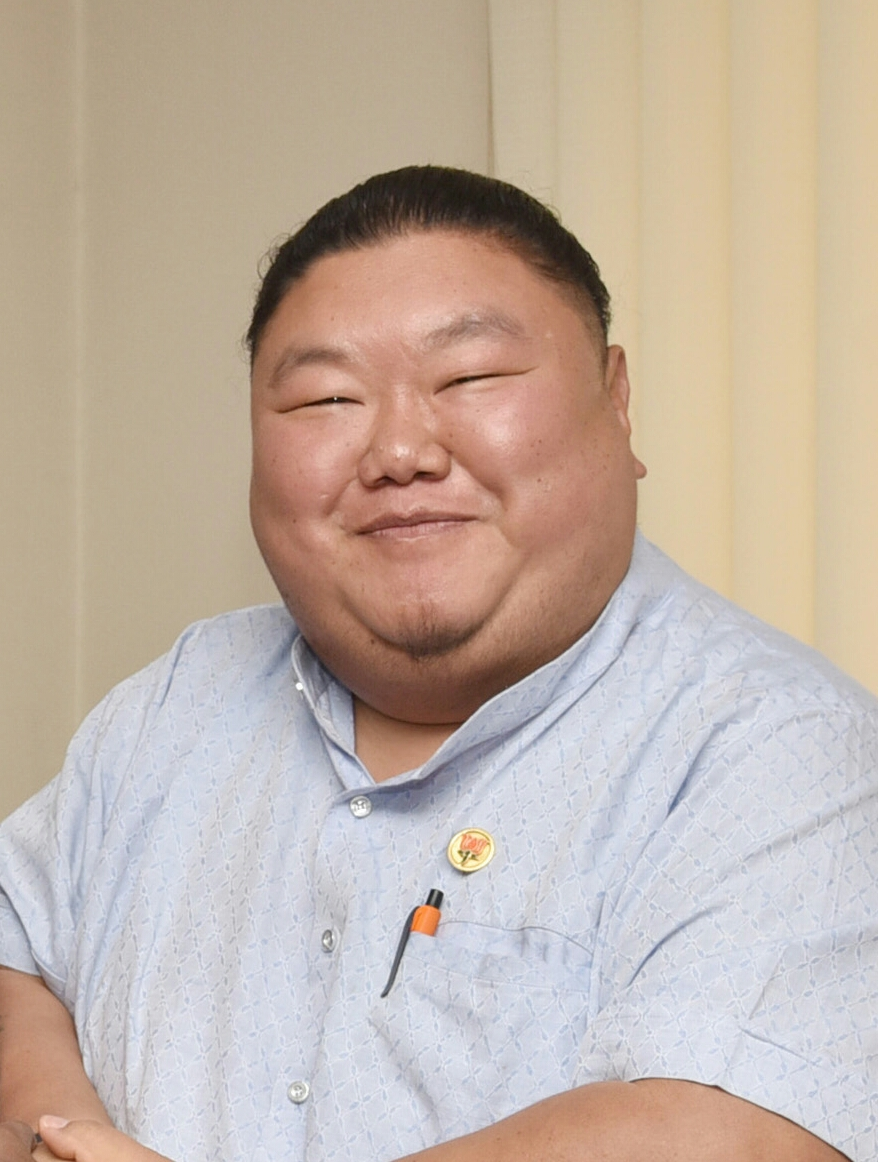
- Imna Along in August 2019

Cabinet Minister, Government of Nagaland
- Incumbent
- Assumed office 8 March 2018
- 7 March 2023 – Incumbent: Minister of Tourism and Higher Education of Nagaland
- 8 March 2018 – 7 March 2023: Minister of Higher and Technical Education and Tribal Affairs of Nagaland

Member of the Nagaland Legislative Assembly
- Incumbent
- Assumed office March 2018
- Preceded by: Benjongliba Aier
- Constituency: Alongtaki

State President of the Bharatiya Janata Party of Nagaland
- In office 15 January 2020 - 25 September 2023

Personal details
- Born: November 25, 1980 (age 45) Mokokchung, Nagaland, India
- Party: Bharatiya Janata Party
- Website: www.alongimna.com

Temjen Imna Along (born 25 November 1980) is an Indian politician and a former State President of the Bharatiya Janata Party of Nagaland, from 15 January 2020 till 25 September 2023. He has been a Member of the Legislative Assembly in the Nagaland Legislative Assembly from Alongtaki constituency since 2018. He is also the Minister of Tourism and Higher Education in the Fifth Neiphiu Rio ministry since 2023.

== In popular culture ==
He is very active on social media and also very popular due to his sense of humour. He also posts about his state and promotes the culture of Nagaland.
