= V. Kashiho Sangtam =

Indian politician

V. Kashiho Sangtam is an Indian Bharatiya Janata Party (BJP) politician from Nagaland, hailing from New Monger village, Kiphire District.

Before entering into politics, Kashiho retired as Assistant Director from the Department of Rural Development in the Government of Nagaland.

He was elected to the Nagaland Legislative Assembly in the 2018 election from Seyochung–Sitimi constituency as a BJP candidate. He was minister of Soil & Water Conservation, Geology and Mining and chairman of the Nagaland State Mineral Development Corporation in the Fourth Neiphiu Rio ministry from 2018 to 2023.
