= T. Yangseo Sangtam =

Indian politician

T. Yangseo Sangtam is an Indian politician who served as Deputy Speaker of the Nagaland Legislative Assembly from 2022 to 2023 and as Member of Nagaland Legislative Assembly from the Pungro Kiphire Assembly constituency.
