= Nationalist Democratic Progressive Party =

Former Political party in India, 2018-2025

- Abbreviation: NDPP
- Founder: Neiphiu Rio
- Founded: 17 May 2017 (8 years ago)
- Dissolved: 19 October 2025 (5 months ago)
- Split from: Naga People's Front
- Merged into: Naga People's Front
- Headquarters: H/No:155 (1), Ward No.4, Chümoukedima, Nagaland, India - 797103
- Ideology: Conservatism; Christian right Naga nationalism Regionalism
- Political position: Centre-right
- Colours: Red; White
- Alliance: NDA (from 2018); UDAN (from 2022)

Election symbol
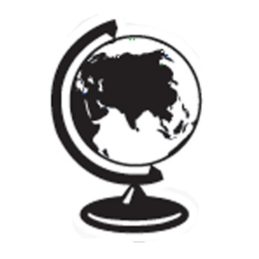

Party flag
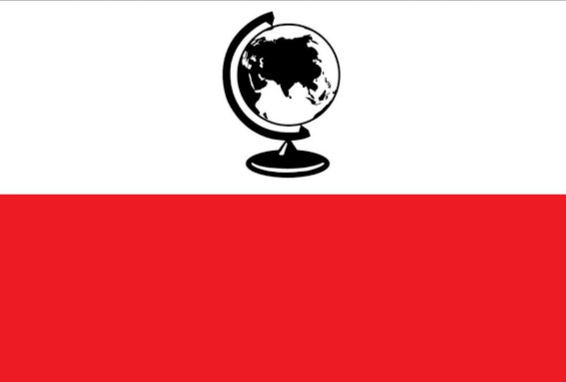

The Nationalist Democratic Progressive Party (NDPP) was a regional political party that ruled the Indian state of Nagaland from 2018 until its merger with Naga People's Front in 2025. The symbol of the party was a globe.

The NDPP was formed by Naga People's Front rebels who supported former Chief Minister of Nagaland Neiphiu Rio, and split to form the Democratic Progressive Party. The NDPP was merged with the Naga People's Front in 2025.

== History ==
The party was established as the Democratic Progressive Party (DPP) in May 2017. In October 2017, the DPP changed its name to Nationalist Democratic Progressive Party.

In January 2018, former Chief Minister Neiphiu Rio joined the party after the Naga People's Front broke its ties with the Bharatiya Janata Party for the 2018 Nagaland Legislative Assembly election. The NDPP then formed an alliance with the BJP for the election. Within the same month, 10 NPF MLAs quit the party and began negotiations with the NDPP.

In the 2018 Nagaland Legislative Assembly election, the NDPP won 18 seats with 253,090 votes and 25.20% vote share. They then came to power in a coalition with the BJP, with Rio as chief minister.

On April 29, 2022, 21 Naga People's Front Nagaland MLAs joined the Nationalist Democratic Progressive Party; this increased the number of NDPP MLAs to 42.

In the 2023 Nagaland Legislative Assembly election, the NDPP emerged as the single largest party and won 25 seats with 369,143 votes and 32.22% vote share. It's ally BJP won 12 seats. Thus, the alliance secured a majority.

In 2025, the party was merged with the Naga People's Front.

== Electoral performance ==
Election Year	Overall votes	% of overall votes	seats contested	seats won	+/- in seats	+/- in vote share
Nagaland Legislative Assembly
2018 (Debut)	253,090	25.2	40	18 / 60	Steady	Steady
2023	3,68,848	32.22	40	25 / 60	▲7	▲7.02

== Chief Minister ==
No (Note: A number inside brackets indicates that the incumbent has previously held office.)	Portrait	Name	Constituency	Term of office		Days in office	Assembly (election)	Coalition
(7)		Neiphiu Rio	Northern Angami II	8 March 2018	7 March 2023	7 years, 225 days	13th (2018 election)	North East Democratic Alliance
(7)		Neiphiu Rio	Northern Angami II	7 March 2023	19 October 2025	7 years, 225 days	14th (2023 election)	North East Democratic Alliance
