= Fifth Rio ministry =

Fifth cabinet headed by Neiphiu Rio

- 22nd Ministry of Nagaland
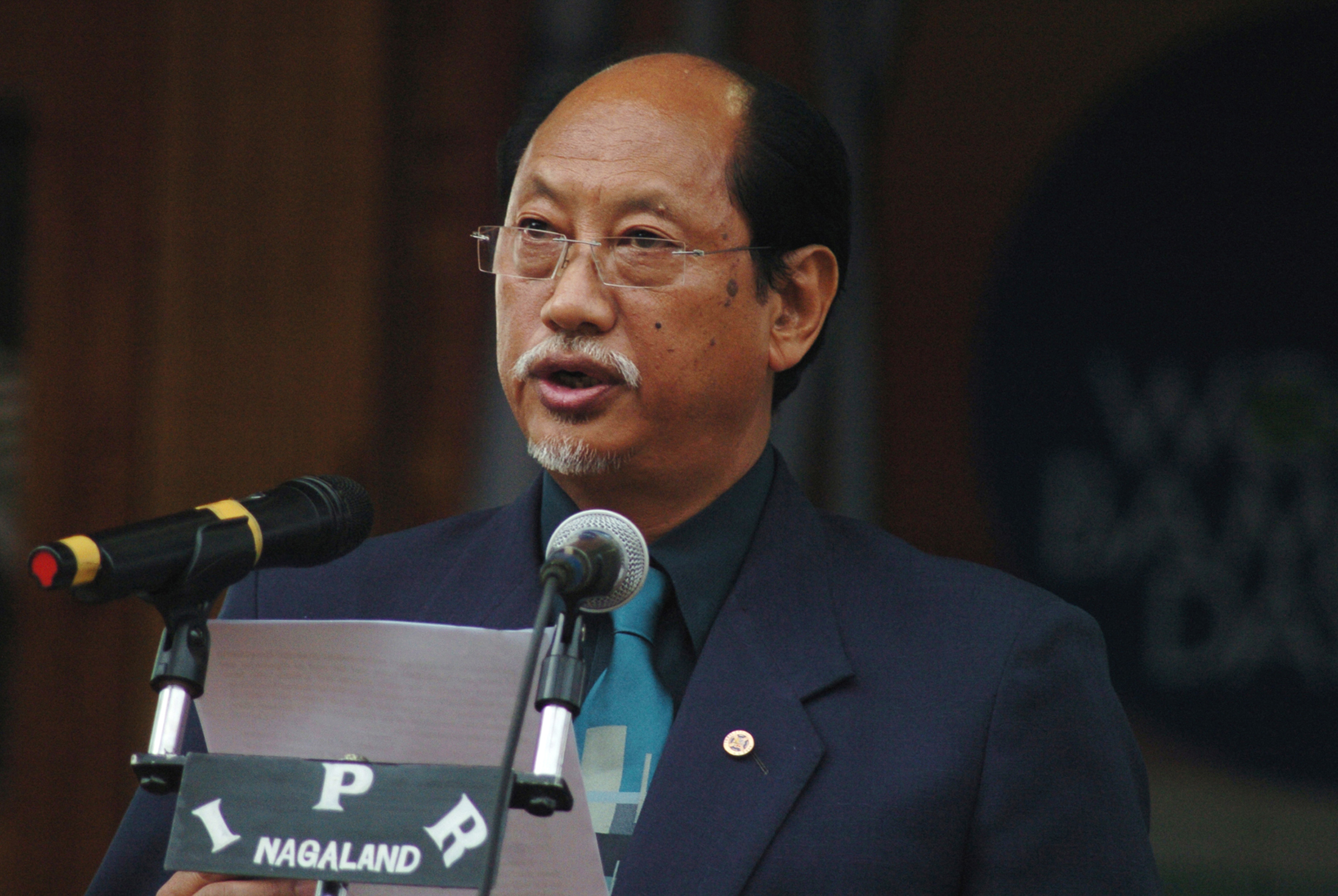
- Neiphiu Rio; Hon'ble Chief Minister of Nagaland
- Date formed: 7 March 2023

People and organisations
- Governor: Governor; La. Ganesan; Ajay Kumar Bhalla acting
- Chief Minister: Neiphiu Rio
- Deputy Chief Minister: T. R. Zeliang & Yanthungo Patton
- Total no. of members: 12
- Member parties: NPF; BJP
- Status in legislature: Coalition

History
- Election: 2023
- Legislature term: 5 years
- Predecessor: Fourth Rio ministry

This is the list of ministers who took oath after 14th Nagaland Assembly formed. Neiphiu Rio became head of the government.

== Council of Ministers ==
S.No	Name	Constituency	Department	Party
1.	Neiphiu Rio; Chief Minister	Northern Anagami II	Finance; Personnel and Administrative Reforms; All important policy issues; Other departments not allocated to any Minister.	NPF
Deputy Chief Minister
2.	T. R. Zeliang	Peren	Planning and Transformation; National Highway	NPF
3.	Yanthungo Patton	Tyüi	Home; Border Affairs	BJP
Cabinet Ministers
4.	C. L. John	Tehok	Forest, Environment and Climate Change; Village Guard	NPF
5.	G. Kaito Aye	Satakha	Roads and Bridges	NPF
6.	Jacob Zhimomi	Ghaspani I	Public Health Engineering; Cooperation	BJP
7.	K. G. Kenye	Chizami	Power; Parliamentary Affairs	NPF
8.	Metsübo Jamir	Mokokchung Town	Rural Development; State Institute of Rural Development (SIDR)	NPF
9.	P. Bashangmongba Chang	Tuensang Sadar I	Housing and Mechanical Engineering	BJP
10.	P. Paiwang Konyak	Tizit	Health and Family Welfare	BJP
11.	Salhoutuonuo Kruse	Western Angami	Women Resource Development; Horticulture	NPF
12.	Temjen Imna Along	Alongtaki	Tourism; Higher Education	BJP

== Advisors ==
S.No	Name	Constituency	Portfolio	Party
1.			Social Welfare	NPF
2.				
3.				
4.				
5.				
6.				
7.				
8.				
9.				
10.				
11.				
12.				
13.				
14.				
15.				
16.				
17.				
18.				
19.				
20.				
21.				
22.				

== Demographics of Council of Ministers ==
District	Ministers	Name of ministers
Chümoukedima and Niuland	1	Jacob Zhimomi
Dimapur	-	-
Kiphire	-	-
Kohima	2	Neiphiu Rio; Salhoutuonuo Kruse
Longleng	-	-
Mokokchung	2	Metsübo Jamir; Temjen Imna Along
Mon	2	P. Paiwang Konyak; C. L. John
Noklak	-	-
Peren	1	T. R. Zeliang
Phek	1	K. G. Kenye
Shamator	-	-
Tseminyü	-	-
Tuensang	1	P. Bashangmongba Chang
Wokha	1	Yanthungo Patton
Zünheboto	1	G. Kaito Aye

== See also ==
- Government of Nagaland
