= 2008 Nagaland Legislative Assembly election =

Legislative Assembly election in Nagaland, India

- 5 March 2008

All 60 seats in the Nagaland Legislative Assembly 31 seats needed for a majority
- Registered: 1,302,266
- Turnout: 86.19%
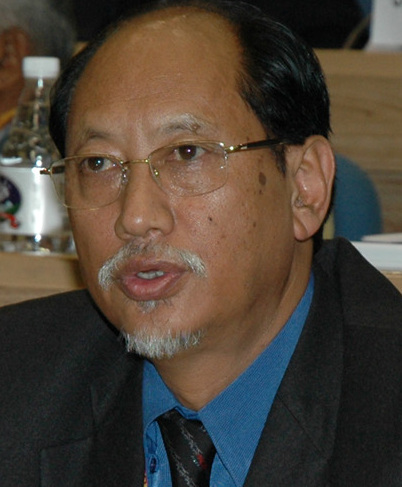
| | Majority party | Minority party |
|---|---|---|
| Leader | Neiphiu Rio | Viswesül Pusa |
| Party | NPF | INC |
| Alliance | NDA | UPA |
| Leader since | 2002 | 1993 |
| Leader's seat | Northern Angami-II | South Angami-II |
| Seats before | 19 | 21 |
| Seats won | 26 | 23 |
| Seat change | ▲7 | ▲2 |
| Popular vote | 32.58% | 35.16 |
CM before election
President's rule
Elected CM
Neiphiu Rio
NPF

Elections to the Nagaland Legislative Assembly were held in March 2008 to elect members of the 60 constituencies in Nagaland, India. The Indian National Congress won the most votes, while the Nagaland Peoples Front won the most seats and Neiphiu Rio was appointed as the Chief Minister of Nagaland. The number of constituencies was set as 60 by the recommendation of the Delimitation Commission of India.

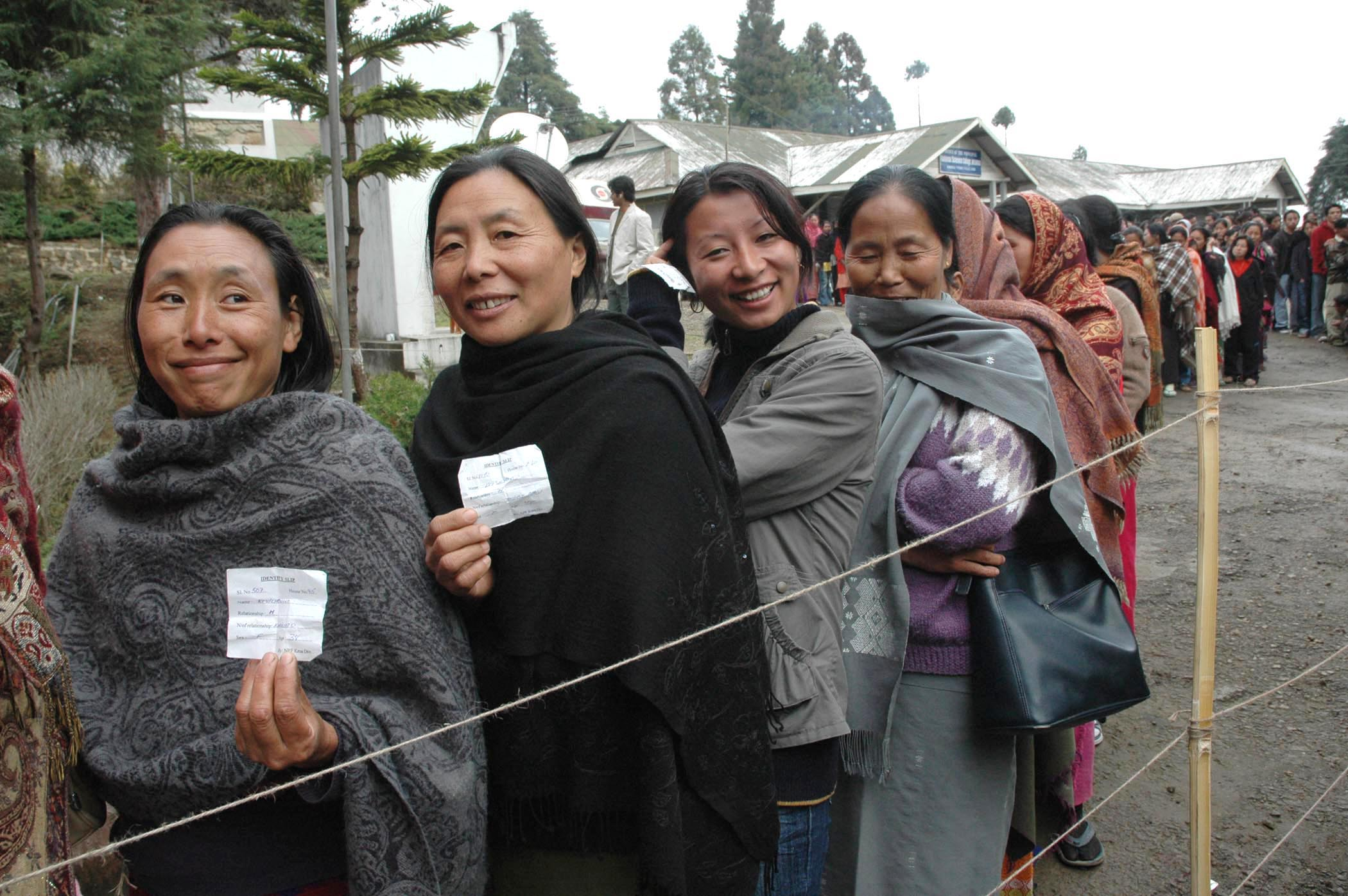
Voters queuing up in Jotsoma village (Western Angami Constituency) to cast their votes for the election.

== Parties contested ==
| Party | Flag | Symbol | Leader | Seats contested |
|---|---|---|---|---|
| Indian National Congress | | | Viswesül Pusa | 60 |
| Naga People's Front | | | Neiphiu Rio | 56 |
| Rashtriya Janata Dal | | | Lalu Prasad Yadav | 25 |
| Bharatiya Janata Party | | | Rajnath Singh | 23 |
| Nationalist Congress Party | | | P. A. Sangma | 8 |
| Janata Dal (Secular) | | | H. D. Deve Gowda | 4 |
| Janata Dal (United) | | | Nitish Kumar | 3 |
| Lok Jan Shakti Party | | | Ram Vilas Paswan | 3 |
| United Naga Democratic Party | | | | 2 |
| Adarsh Political Party | | | | 1 |

== Result ==
| Party | Votes | % | Seats | +/– |
|---|---|---|---|---|
| Indian National Congress | 411,100 | 35.16 | 23 | ▲2 |
| Nagaland Peoples Front | 380,964 | 32.58 | 26 | ▲7 |
| Bharatiya Janata Party | 96,658 | 8.27 | 2 | ▼5 |
| Rashtriya Janata Dal | 74,298 | 6.35 | 0 | New |
| Nationalist Congress Party | 45,397 | 3.88 | 2 | ▲2 |
| Janata Dal (Secular) | 3,671 | 0.31 | 0 | New |
| Janata Dal (United) | 3,243 | 0.28 | 0 | ▼3 |
| Lok Jan Shakti Party | 2,960 | 0.25 | 0 | New |
| United Naga Democratic Party | 2,583 | 0.22 | 0 | New |
| Adarsh Political Party | 81 | 0.01 | 0 | New |
| Independents | 148,297 | 12.68 | 7 | ▲3 |
| Total | 1,169,252 | 100.00 | 60 | 0 |
| Valid votes | 1,169,252 | 99.84 | | |
| Invalid/blank votes | 1,896 | 0.16 | | |
| Total votes | 1,171,148 | 100.00 | | |
| Registered voters/turnout | 1,302,266 | 89.93 | | |
Source: ECI

=== Results by constituency ===
Winner, runner-up, voter turnout, and victory margin in every constituency
| Assembly Constituency | | Turnout | Winner | | | | Runner Up | | | | Margin |
| #k | Names | % | Candidate | Party | Votes | % | Candidate | Party | Votes | % | Margin |
|---|---|---|---|---|---|---|---|---|---|---|---|
| 1 | Dimapur I | 80.83 | K. L. Chishi | INC | 8,700 | 60.16 | Atomi | NPF | 4,774 | 33.01 | 3,926 |
| 2 | Dimapur II | 75.13 | S. I. Jamir | INC | 17,954 | 54.16 | Savi Liegise | NPF | 15,195 | 45.84 | 2,759 |
| 3 | Dimapur III | 78.77 | Azheto Zhimomi | INC | 7,874 | 50.16 | L. Inazhe Sema | RJD | 4,871 | 31.03 | 3,003 |
| 4 | Ghaspani I | 81.86 | Y. Hewoto Awomi | INC | 17,646 | 36.58 | H. Khekiho Zhimomi | NPF | 16,132 | 33.45 | 1,514 |
| 5 | Ghaspani II | 83.65 | K. Hollohon | IND | 8,312 | 35.61 | Rokonicha | NPF | 6,661 | 28.54 | 1,651 |
| 6 | Tening | 86.42 | Tarie Zeliang | INC | 15,224 | 59.59 | K. Samuel Medaliang | NPF | 10,323 | 40.41 | 4,901 |
| 7 | Peren | 87.45 | T. R. Zeliang | NPF | 14,959 | 57.45 | Vatsu Meru | INC | 11,080 | 42.55 | 3,879 |
| 8 | Western Angami | 76.73 | Kiyanilie Peseyie | NPF | 6,284 | 40.62 | Achubu | INC | 4,854 | 31.37 | 1,430 |
| 9 | Kohima Town | 74.48 | Neikiesalie Nicky Kire | NPF | 16,197 | 58.09 | Z. Obed | INC | 9,094 | 32.61 | 7,103 |
| 10 | Northern Angami I | 76.09 | Shürhozelie Liezietsu | NPF | 6,229 | 37.50 | Prasielie Pienyu | IND | 5,256 | 31.64 | 973 |
| 11 | Northern Angami II | 83.41 | Neiphiu Rio | NPF | 13,641 | 82.57 | Sevetso | INC | 2,880 | 17.43 | 10,761 |
| 12 | Tseminyü | 95.66 | R. Khing | NPF | 8,216 | 33.71 | Levi Rengma | IND | 8,150 | 33.44 | 66 |
| 13 | Pughoboto | 91.85 | Joshua Achumi | INC | 6,853 | 44.24 | Y. Vikheho Swu | NPF | 6,421 | 41.46 | 432 |
| 14 | Southern Angami I | 87.10 | Vikho-o Yhoshü | NPF | 6,774 | 57.50 | Medokul Sophie | INC | 5,006 | 42.50 | 1,768 |
| 15 | Southern Angami II | 84.22 | Viswesül Pusa | INC | 5,116 | 37.47 | Atha Vizol | NPF | 4,598 | 33.68 | 518 |
| 16 | Pfütsero | 71.07 | Neiba Kronu | NPF | 9,617 | 52.88 | Kewekhape Therie | INC | 8,204 | 45.11 | 1,413 |
| 17 | Chizami | 94.78 | Deo Nukhu | INC | 8,117 | 39.16 | Kewezu | NPF | 7,942 | 38.31 | 175 |
| 18 | Chozuba | 87.94 | Chotisuh Sazo | IND | 8,754 | 37.56 | Vaprumu Demo | INC | 7,402 | 31.76 | 1,352 |
| 19 | Phek | 79.45 | Küzholuzo Nienü | NPF | 10,919 | 55.43 | Dezoto Rhakho | RJD | 4,643 | 23.57 | 6,276 |
| 20 | Meluri | 91.54 | Yitachu | NPF | 11,121 | 57.50 | Penthu | INC | 8,183 | 42.31 | 2,938 |
| 21 | Tuli | 69.61 | L. Temjen Jamir | NPF | 4,411 | 28.45 | T. Tali | IND | 4,231 | 27.29 | 180 |
| 22 | Arkakong | 86.38 | Nuklutoshi | NPF | 9,035 | 45.40 | Takatiba Masa Ao | INC | 8,455 | 42.49 | 580 |
| 23 | Impur | 92.72 | Nungsangyapang | INC | 10,373 | 61.42 | T. N. Mannen | RJD | 6,184 | 36.61 | 4,189 |
| 24 | Angetyongpang | 84.70 | Tongpang Ozüküm | INC | 8,304 | 53.46 | Jongshilemba | RJD | 7,069 | 45.51 | 1,235 |
| 25 | Mongoya | 83.87 | Ngangshi K. Ao | IND | 7,325 | 53.14 | S. Supongmeren Jamir | INC | 4,291 | 31.13 | 3,034 |
| 26 | Aonglenden | 75.98 | Nungshizenba | INC | 4,380 | 47.01 | Imtikümzük Longkümer | IND | 2,841 | 30.49 | 1,539 |
| 27 | Mokokchung Town | 79.70 | Chubatoshi Apok Jamir | INC | 2,085 | 42.94 | Aolepden | IND | 1,459 | 30.05 | 626 |
| 28 | Koridang | 86.03 | Imkong L. Imchen | NPF | 10,144 | 52.00 | T. Chenung Longchar | IND | 8,947 | 45.87 | 1,197 |
| 29 | Jangpetkong | 86.16 | I. Imkong | INC | 7,721 | 58.80 | Longrineken | NPF | 5,410 | 41.20 | 2,311 |
| 30 | Alongtaki | 84.30 | Sakusangba | NPF | 9,521 | 59.75 | Tiameren Aier | INC | 5,637 | 35.37 | 3,884 |
| 31 | Akuluto | 96.50 | Kheto | INC | 7,100 | 64.63 | Khetoho | NPF | 3,885 | 35.37 | 3,215 |
| 32 | Atoizu | 89.04 | Doshehe Y. Sema | NPF | 8,188 | 51.79 | Mghato Achumi | INC | 7,622 | 48.21 | 566 |
| 33 | Suruhoto | 91.11 | Shetoyi | IND | 7,053 | 52.83 | Khutovi | INC | 6,257 | 46.87 | 796 |
| 34 | Aghunato | 90.18 | Tokheho Yepthomi | INC | 6,997 | 52.93 | Pukhayi | NPF | 6,223 | 47.07 | 774 |
| 35 | Zünheboto | 79.81 | K. C. Nihoshe | IND | 9,592 | 52.10 | S. Hukavi Zhimomi | INC | 8,403 | 45.65 | 1,189 |
| 36 | Satakha | 84.31 | G. Kaito Aye | NPF | 7,621 | 56.33 | Inavi | INC | 5,909 | 43.67 | 1,712 |
| 37 | Tyüi | 96.57 | Yanthungo Patton | BJP | 6,172 | 30.72 | Yankithung Yanthan | INC | 5,335 | 26.56 | 837 |
| 38 | Wokha | 83.54 | Chumben Murry | NCP | 14,181 | 42.45 | T. M. Lotha | BJP | 8,270 | 24.76 | 5,911 |
| 39 | Sanis | 95.80 | Ralanthung Yanthan | NPF | 5,114 | 22.75 | T. L. Merry | BJP | 4,037 | 17.96 | 1,077 |
| 40 | Bhandari | 93.30 | Wochumo Kithan | NPF | 6,059 | 25.91 | Mmhonlümo Kikon | NCP | 4,301 | 18.40 | 1,758 |
| 41 | Tizit | 89.31 | Aloh | INC | 8,463 | 50.12 | Tingkup | NPF | 6,284 | 37.22 | 2,179 |
| 42 | Wakching | 97.51 | M. C. Konyak | BJP | 7,476 | 38.88 | Yona | INC | 6,213 | 32.31 | 1,263 |
| 43 | Tapi | 89.58 | Lanpha Konyak | INC | 6,941 | 53.81 | Noke Wangnao | NPF | 5,957 | 46.19 | 984 |
| 44 | Phomching | 93.17 | Kongam | INC | 8,802 | 48.28 | Pohwang Konyak | BJP | 7,773 | 42.63 | 1,029 |
| 45 | Tehok | 92.83 | C. L. John | NPF | 7,829 | 53.29 | Shaboh | INC | 6,426 | 43.74 | 1,403 |
| 46 | Mon Town | 86.44 | Chingwang Konyak | INC | 10,316 | 58.00 | N. Thongwang Konyak | NPF | 7,136 | 40.12 | 3,180 |
| 47 | Aboi | 96.83 | Nyeiwang Konyak | NPF | 5,415 | 51.83 | E. Eshak Konyak | RJD | 4,799 | 45.94 | 616 |
| 48 | Moka | 94.86 | E. E. Pangteang | NPF | 8,256 | 52.97 | A. Nyamnyei Konyak | INC | 6,190 | 39.72 | 2,066 |
| 49 | Tamlu | 99.67 | P. Dako Phom | IND | 17,860 | 53.53 | B. S. Nganlang Phom | INC | 12,932 | 38.76 | 4,928 |
| 50 | Longleng | 96.18 | S. Pangnyu Phom | NCP | 13,535 | 36.84 | T. L. Semdok | RJD | 11,309 | 30.78 | 2,226 |
| 51 | Noksen | 78.47 | H. Chuba Chang | INC | 2,988 | 32.55 | C. M. Chang | NPF | 2,905 | 31.64 | 83 |
| 52 | Longkhim Chare | 97.67 | S. Kyukhangba Sangtam | INC | 7,437 | 38.57 | Imtilemba Sangtam | BJP | 6,474 | 33.57 | 963 |
| 53 | Tuensang Sadar I | 70.79 | P. Chuba | INC | 9,230 | 56.22 | Nungsanglemba Chang | BJP | 4,078 | 24.84 | 5,152 |
| 54 | Tuensang Sadar II | 94.02 | Kejong Chang | INC | 7,628 | 43.58 | Rhakila | NCP | 7,275 | 41.56 | 353 |
| 55 | Tobu | 95.22 | Naiba Konyak | NPF | 10,017 | 58.26 | Bongkhao | INC | 7,176 | 41.74 | 2,841 |
| 56 | Noklak | 92.05 | Puthai Longon | NPF | 7,939 | 60.18 | Sedem Khaming | INC | 2,167 | 16.43 | 5,772 |
| 57 | Thonoknyu | 91.12 | S. Heno Khiamniungan | NPF | 5,600 | 34.58 | Pongom | IND | 3,432 | 21.19 | 2,168 |
| 58 | Shamator–Chessore | 92.38 | R. Tohanba | NPF | 9,315 | 48.54 | K. Yamakam | INC | 6,922 | 36.07 | 2,393 |
| 59 | Seyochung–Sitimi | 96.70 | C. Kipili Sangtam | IND | 8,054 | 38.18 | Sethricho Shihote | INC | 6,754 | 32.02 | 1,300 |
| 60 | Pungro–Kiphire | 93.31 | T. Torechu | NPF | 13,275 | 49.56 | R. L. Akamba | INC | 9,308 | 34.75 | 3,967 |

== See also ==
- List of constituencies of the Nagaland Legislative Assembly
- 2008 elections in India
