= Pfütsero Assembly constituency =

Legislative Assembly constituency in Nagaland State, India

Coordinates: 25.57°N 94.3°E

Pfütsero
- Constituency No. 16 for the Nagaland Legislative Assembly

Constituency details
- Country: India
- Region: Northeast India
- State: Nagaland
- District: Phek
- Lok Sabha constituency: Nagaland
- Established: 1964
- Total electors: 20,805
- Reservation: ST

Member of Legislative Assembly
- 14th Nagaland Legislative Assembly
- Incumbent Neisatuo Mero
- Party: Independent
- Elected year: 2023

Pfütsero is one of the 60 Legislative Assembly constituencies of Nagaland state in India.

It is part of Phek district and is reserved for candidates belonging to the Scheduled Tribes.

== Members of the Legislative Assembly ==
| Year | Member | Party |
|---|---|---|
| 1964 | Wezhulhu | Independent politician |
| 1969 | Weprenyi Kapfo | Independent politician |
| 1974 | Weprenyi Kapfo | United Democratic Alliance |
| 1977 | Lhiweshelo Mero | United Democratic Alliance |
| 1982 | Thenucho Tünyi | Naga National Democratic Party |
| 1987 | Thenucho Tünyi | Naga National Democratic Party |
| 1989 | Thenucho Tünyi | Naga People's Front |
| 1993 | Kewekhape | Indian National Congress |
| 1998 | Kewekhape Therie | Indian National Congress |
| 2003 | Kewekhape Therie | Naga People's Front |
| 2008 | Neiba Kronu | Naga People's Front |
| 2013 | Neiba Kronu | Naga People's Front |
| 2018 | Neiba Kronu | Nationalist Democratic Progressive Party |
| 2023 | Dr. Neisatuo Mero | Independent politician |

== Election results ==
=== 2023 Assembly election ===
2023 Nagaland Legislative Assembly election: Pfütsero
| Party | Candidate | Votes | % | ±% |
|---|---|---|---|---|
| Independent | Dr. Neisatuo Mero | 7,995 | 42.06% | |
| NDPP | Neiba Kronu | 7,891 | 41.52% | 4.65% |
| NPF | Vivolie Kezo | 3,059 | 16.09% | −12.99% |
| NOTA | Nota | 62 | 0.33% | |
| Margin of victory | | 104 | 0.55% | −7.23% |
| Turnout | | 19,007 | 91.36% | 9.44% |
| Registered electors | | 20,805 | | 0.89% |
| Independent gain from NDPP | | Swing | 5.20% | |

=== 2018 Assembly election ===
2018 Nagaland Legislative Assembly election: Pfütsero
| Party | Candidate | Votes | % | ±% |
|---|---|---|---|---|
| NDPP | Neiba Kronu | 6,228 | 36.87% | |
| NPF | Thenucho | 4,914 | 29.09% | −3.12% |
| INC | Kewekhape Therie | 3,785 | 22.41% | −6.47% |
| NPP | Vivolie Kezo | 1,914 | 11.33% | |
| NOTA | None of the Above | 52 | 0.31% | |
| Margin of victory | | 1,314 | 7.78% | 4.44% |
| Turnout | | 16,893 | 81.92% | −11.96% |
| Registered electors | | 20,622 | | −6.03% |
| NDPP gain from NPF | | Swing | 4.66% | |

=== 2013 Assembly election ===
2013 Nagaland Legislative Assembly election: Pfütsero
| Party | Candidate | Votes | % | ±% |
|---|---|---|---|---|
| NPF | Neiba Kronu | 6,636 | 32.21% | −13.82% |
| INC | Kewekhape Therie | 5,949 | 28.88% | −10.39% |
| United Naga Democratic Party | Thenucho | 4,071 | 19.76% | |
| Independent | Vivolie Kezo | 3,933 | 19.09% | |
| Margin of victory | | 687 | 3.33% | −3.43% |
| Turnout | | 20,602 | 93.88% | 12.23% |
| Registered electors | | 21,946 | | −14.23% |
| NPF hold | | Swing | -13.82% | |

=== 2008 Assembly election ===
2008 Nagaland Legislative Assembly election: Pfütsero
| Party | Candidate | Votes | % | ±% |
|---|---|---|---|---|
| NPF | Neiba Kronu | 9,617 | 46.03% | −5.01% |
| INC | Kewekhape Therie | 8,204 | 39.27% | −2.49% |
| RJD | Pfuchukha Lasushe | 364 | 1.74% | |
| Margin of victory | | 1,413 | 6.76% | −2.52% |
| Turnout | | 20,891 | 71.07% | −5.97% |
| Registered electors | | 25,587 | | 38.40% |
| NPF hold | | Swing | -5.01% | |

=== 2003 Assembly election ===
2003 Nagaland Legislative Assembly election: Pfütsero
| Party | Candidate | Votes | % | ±% |
|---|---|---|---|---|
| NPF | Kewekhape | 8,268 | 51.04% | |
| INC | Lhiweshelo Mero | 6,765 | 41.76% | |
| NDM | Kuhupoyo | 1,165 | 7.19% | |
| Margin of victory | | 1,503 | 9.28% | |
| Turnout | | 16,198 | 87.61% | 1.84% |
| Registered electors | | 18,488 | | 8.75% |
| NPF gain from INC | | Swing | -6.90% | |

=== 1998 Assembly election ===
1998 Nagaland Legislative Assembly election: Pfütsero
| Party | Candidate | Votes | % | ±% |
|---|---|---|---|---|
| INC | Kewekhape Therie | Unopposed | | |
| Margin of victory | | | | |
| Registered electors | | 17,001 | | 12.49% |
| INC hold | | Swing | | |

=== 1993 Assembly election ===
1993 Nagaland Legislative Assembly election: Pfütsero
| Party | Candidate | Votes | % | ±% |
|---|---|---|---|---|
| INC | Kewekhape | 7,473 | 57.94% | 8.53% |
| NPF | Thenucho | 5,425 | 42.06% | −8.53% |
| Margin of victory | | 2,048 | 15.88% | 14.70% |
| Turnout | | 12,898 | 85.77% | 0.22% |
| Registered electors | | 15,113 | | 69.20% |
| INC gain from NPF | | Swing | 7.35% | |

=== 1989 Assembly election ===
1989 Nagaland Legislative Assembly election: Pfütsero
| Party | Candidate | Votes | % | ±% |
|---|---|---|---|---|
| NPF | Thenucho | 3,821 | 50.59% | |
| INC | Lhiweshelo Mero | 3,732 | 49.41% | 1.25% |
| Margin of victory | | 89 | 1.18% | −2.51% |
| Turnout | | 7,553 | 85.56% | 7.76% |
| Registered electors | | 8,932 | | 0.00% |
| NPF gain from NND | | Swing | -1.25% | |

=== 1987 Assembly election ===
1987 Nagaland Legislative Assembly election: Pfütsero
| Party | Candidate | Votes | % | ±% |
|---|---|---|---|---|
| NND | Jhenucho | 3,543 | 51.84% | 11.86% |
| INC | Lhiweshelo Mero | 3,291 | 48.16% | 14.70% |
| Margin of victory | | 252 | 3.69% | −2.84% |
| Turnout | | 6,834 | 77.80% | 11.09% |
| Registered electors | | 8,932 | | 2.17% |
| NND hold | | Swing | 11.86% | |

=== 1982 Assembly election ===
1982 Nagaland Legislative Assembly election: Pfütsero
| Party | Candidate | Votes | % | ±% |
|---|---|---|---|---|
| NND | Thenucho | 2,310 | 39.98% | |
| INC | Lhiweshelo Mero | 1,933 | 33.45% | |
| Independent | Kewekhape | 1,535 | 26.57% | |
| Margin of victory | | 377 | 6.52% | −11.53% |
| Turnout | | 5,778 | 66.71% | −13.94% |
| Registered electors | | 8,742 | | 73.28% |
| NND gain from UDA | | Swing | 1.04% | |

=== 1977 Assembly election ===
1977 Nagaland Legislative Assembly election: Pfütsero
| Party | Candidate | Votes | % | ±% |
|---|---|---|---|---|
| UDA | Lhiweshelo Mero | 1,568 | 38.94% | −1.44% |
| NCN | Vepari | 841 | 20.88% | |
| Independent | Kewekhape Therie | 818 | 20.31% | |
| Independent | Weprenyi Kapfo | 800 | 19.87% | |
| Margin of victory | | 727 | 18.05% | 6.81% |
| Turnout | | 4,027 | 80.65% | 8.06% |
| Registered electors | | 5,045 | | −26.54% |
| UDA hold | | Swing | -1.44% | |

=== 1974 Assembly election ===
1974 Nagaland Legislative Assembly election: Pfütsero
| Party | Candidate | Votes | % | ±% |
|---|---|---|---|---|
| UDA | Weprenyi Kapfo | 1,969 | 40.38% | |
| Independent | Vepari | 1,421 | 29.14% | |
| NNO | Wezulhi Krome | 756 | 15.50% | −16.83% |
| Independent | Snokha | 714 | 14.64% | |
| Margin of victory | | 548 | 11.24% | −4.48% |
| Turnout | | 4,876 | 72.60% | −6.97% |
| Registered electors | | 6,868 | | 76.33% |
| UDA gain from Independent | | Swing | -7.67% | |

=== 1969 Assembly election ===
1969 Nagaland Legislative Assembly election: Pfütsero
| Party | Candidate | Votes | % | ±% |
|---|---|---|---|---|
| Independent | Weprenyi Kapfo | 1,489 | 48.05% | |
| NNO | Wezulhi Krome | 1,002 | 32.33% | |
| Independent | Vepari | 608 | 19.62% | |
| Margin of victory | | 487 | 15.71% | −24.22% |
| Turnout | | 3,099 | 79.56% | −6.78% |
| Registered electors | | 3,895 | | 43.78% |
| Independent hold | | Swing | -21.92% | |

=== 1964 Assembly election ===
1964 Nagaland Legislative Assembly election: Pfütsero
| Party | Candidate | Votes | % | ±% |
|---|---|---|---|---|
| Independent | Wezhulhu | 1,633 | 69.97% | |
| Independent | Kewetso Ritse | 701 | 30.03% | |
| Margin of victory | | 932 | 39.93% | |
| Turnout | | 2,334 | 86.34% | |
| Registered electors | | 2,709 | | |
| Independent win (new seat) | | | | |

== See also ==
- List of constituencies of the Nagaland Legislative Assembly
- Phek district
