= Neisatuo Mero =

Indian politician

Neisatuo Mero (born 1976) is an Indian politician from Nagaland. He is an MLA from the Pfütsero Assembly constituency, which is reserved for Scheduled Tribe community, in Phek district. He won the 2023 Nagaland Legislative Assembly election, as an independent candidate.

== Early life and education ==
Mero is from Pfütsero, Phek district, Nagaland. He is the son of the late Ditsozu Mero. He completed his BDS in 1995 at Gauhati University. His wife is in government service.

== Career ==
Mero was elected from the Pfütsero Assembly constituency as an independent candidate in the 2023 Nagaland Legislative Assembly election. He polled 7,995 votes and defeated his nearest rival and sitting MLA, Neiba Kronu of the Nationalist Democratic Progressive Party, by a margin of 104 votes. It was a big shock to the NDPP, as Kronu was a cabinet minister for land revenue and parliamentary affairs.
