= A. Nyamnyei Konyak =

Indian politician

A. Nyamnyei Konyak (born 1955) is an Indian politician from Nagaland. He is a five-time MLA from the Moka Assembly constituency, which is reserved for Scheduled Tribe community, in Mon district. He won the 2023 Nagaland Legislative Assembly election, representing the National People's Party.

== Early life and education ==
Konyak is from Moka, Mon District, Nagaland. He is the son of the late Anchao Konyak. He passed Class 8 in 1979.

== Career ==
Konyak won the Moka Assembly constituency representing the National People's Party in the 2023 Nagaland Legislative Assembly election. He polled 8,857 votes and defeated his nearest rival and sitting MLA, E. E. Pangteang of the Nationalist Democratic Progressive Party, by a margin of 556 votes. Earlier, he had lost to Pangteang in both the 2008 and 2003 Assembly elections. He was first elected as an MLA in the 1982 Nagaland Legislative Assembly election representing the Naga National Democratic Party. In 1982, he polled 2,724 votes and defeated his nearest rival, K. Kiko Konyak, an independent candidate, by 811 votes. He joined the Indian National Congress and retained the seat in the 1987 Nagaland Legislative Assembly election. He regained the seat and won for a third time, also on a Congress ticket, in the 1993 election and won again in the 1998 election, but as an independent candidate. Thereafter, Pangteang of the Naga People's Front won four consecutive terms including the 2018 election before Konyak regained it in the 2023 Assembly election.
