= Mhathung Yanthan =

Indian politician

Member of the Nagaland Legislative Assembly
- Incumbent
- Assumed office 2018
- Constituency: Sanis

Personal details
- Born: Wokha district, Nagaland, India
- Party: Naga People's Front
- Occupation: Technocrat, Politician, Advisor of agriculture to the Chief Minister

Mhathung Yanthan (born 1 May 1960) is an Indian politician from the state of Nagaland, representing the Sanis Assembly constituency. He is a two-time member of the Nagaland Legislative Assembly since 2018.

== Early life and education ==
Yanthan is from the Lotha Naga community in the Wokha district of Nagaland. Before entering politics, he served as an Agriculture Officer in various capacities and retired as Director of the Land Resources Department, Government of Nagaland. He was also a team leader/mission director with the Nagaland Honey Bee mission, Bamboo Mission and is considered as the chief architect in the introduction of rubber plantations in the state of Nagaland, which is considered a success story today. He is the son of late Ashemo Yanthan. He completed his B.Sc in agriculture at Hisar Agriculture University (HAU), Haryana, and his M.Sc. in agriculture in 1985 at Orissa University of Agriculture and Technology, Bhubaneshwar.

== Political career ==
Yanthan began his political career as a member of the Nationalist Democratic Progressive Party and won the Sanis constituency seat in the 2018 Nagaland Legislative Assembly election. He polled 10,548 votes and defeated his nearest rival, Ramongo Lotha of Janata Dal (United), by a margin of 2,992 votes. He was named the chief minister's advisor on horticulture and borders affairs.

In the 2023 Nagaland Legislative Assembly election, he retained his seat in Sanis. He polled 15,076 votes and defeated Senkathung Jami of the RJD, by a margin of 9,513 votes. He was named the chief minister's advisor on agriculture.

== See also ==
- Naga People's Front
- Nagaland Legislative Assembly
