= Metsübo Jamir =

Indian politician

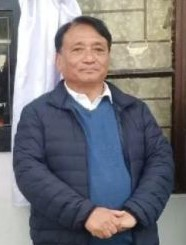
- Metsubo Jamir in 2023

Cabinet Minister, Government of Nagaland
- Incumbent
- Assumed office 7 March 2023
- Governor: La. Ganesan
- Cabinet: Fifth Rio ministry
- Chief Minister: Neiphiu Rio
- Ministry and Departments: Rural Development; State Institute of Rural Development (SIDR)
- In office 7 March 2018 – March 2023
- Governor: Padmanabha Acharya; R. N. Ravi; Jagdish Mukhi; La. Ganesan
- Cabinet: Fourth Rio ministry
- Chief Minister: Neiphiu Rio
- Ministry and Departments: Rural Development

Member of Nagaland Legislative Assembly
- Incumbent
- Assumed office March 2018
- Preceded by: C. Apok Jamir
- Constituency: Mokokchung Town

Personal details
- Party: Naga People's Front

Metsübo Jamir is a Naga People's Front politician from Nagaland. He is the longest serving Director of the Rural Development Department Nagaland . He is the son of N.I. Jamir (former minister and former chief secretary of Nagaland) and the younger brother of Alemtemshi Jamir IAS (former chief secretary of Nagaland). He was elected to the Nagaland Legislative Assembly election in the 2018 election from Mokokchung Town constituency as a candidate of the Nationalist Democratic Progressive Party. He has been Minister of Rural Development since 2018.

Personal Life

Metsubo Jamir is married to Alemla Jamir, a retired government servant and he has one son and one daughter. His son is Temjenmoa Jamir who is married to Unokali Assumi in November 2022.
