= Jangpetkong Assembly constituency =

Legislative Assembly constituency in Nagaland State, India

Coordinates: 26.44°N 94.62°E

Jangpetkong
- Constituency No. 29 for the Nagaland Legislative Assembly

Constituency details
- Country: India
- Region: Northeast India
- State: Nagaland
- District: Mokokchung
- Lok Sabha constituency: Nagaland
- Established: 1964
- Total electors: 12,861
- Reservation: ST

Member of Legislative Assembly
- 14th Nagaland Legislative Assembly
- Incumbent Temjenmenba
- Party: NPF
- Alliance: NDA
- Elected year: 2023

Jangpetkong is one of the 60 Legislative Assembly constituencies of Nagaland state in India.

It is part of Mokokchung district and is reserved for candidates belonging to the Scheduled Tribes.

== Members of the Legislative Assembly ==
Year	Member	Party
1964	R. Lesen	Independent politician
1966 by-election	Imchalemba Ao	Independent politician
1969	I. Arienba	Independent politician
1974	Imchalemba Ao	Independent politician
1977	Imchalemba Ao	United Democratic Alliance
1982	I. Imkong	Indian National Congress
1987	Chubatemjen Ao	Indian National Congress
1989	Chubatemjen Ao	Indian National Congress
1993	I. Imkong	Indian National Congress
1998	I. Imkong	Indian National Congress
2003	I. Imkong	Indian National Congress
2008	I. Imkong	Indian National Congress
2013	Longrineken	Naga People's Front
2018	Longrineken	Bharatiya Janata Party
2023	Temjenmenba	Nationalist Democratic Progressive Party

== Election results ==
=== 2023 Assembly election ===
2023 Nagaland Legislative Assembly election: Jangpetkong
Party	Candidate	Votes	%	±%
NDPP	Temjenmemba	6,238	55.39%	
NPF	Imjongwati Longkumer	4,237	37.62%	4.84%
LJP(RV)	Longrineken	777	6.90%	
NOTA	Nota	10	0.09%	
Margin of victory		2,001	17.77%	15.06%
Turnout		11,262	87.57%	−2.74%
Registered electors		12,861		14.05%
NDPP gain from BJP		Swing	19.89%	

=== 2018 Assembly election ===
2018 Nagaland Legislative Assembly election: Jangpetkong
Party	Candidate	Votes	%	±%
BJP	Longrineken	3,615	35.50%	
NPF	E. T. Sunup	3,339	32.79%	0.15%
NPP	Dr. K. Chuba	3,185	31.27%	
NOTA	None of the Above	45	0.44%	
Margin of victory		276	2.71%	1.08%
Turnout		10,184	90.31%	1.46%
Registered electors		11,277		4.90%
BJP gain from NPF		Swing	2.86%	

=== 2013 Assembly election ===
2013 Nagaland Legislative Assembly election: Jangpetkong
Party	Candidate	Votes	%	±%
NPF	Longrineken	3,117	32.64%	−8.78%
Independent	E. T. Sunup	2,961	31.00%	
Independent	Dr. K. Chuba	2,549	26.69%	
INC	I. Imkong	919	9.62%	−49.49%
Margin of victory		156	1.63%	−16.06%
Turnout		9,551	88.85%	3.14%
Registered electors		10,750		−29.47%
NPF gain from INC		Swing	-26.48%	

=== 2008 Assembly election ===
2008 Nagaland Legislative Assembly election: Jangpetkong
Party	Candidate	Votes	%	±%
INC	I. Imkong	7,721	59.11%	−14.97%
NPF	Longrineken	5,410	41.42%	23.89%
Margin of victory		2,311	17.69%	−38.87%
Turnout		13,062	86.16%	6.84%
Registered electors		15,241		40.55%
INC hold		Swing	-14.97%	

=== 2003 Assembly election ===
2003 Nagaland Legislative Assembly election: Jangpetkong
Party	Candidate	Votes	%	±%
INC	I. Imkong	6,329	74.08%	
NPF	Chubatemjen Ao	1,497	17.52%	
SAP	N. Meren Ozukum	717	8.39%	
Margin of victory		4,832	56.56%	
Turnout		8,543	78.86%	78.86%
Registered electors		10,844		10.10%
INC hold		Swing	2.59%	

=== 1998 Assembly election ===
1998 Nagaland Legislative Assembly election: Jangpetkong
Party	Candidate	Votes	%	±%
INC	I. Imkong	Unopposed		
Registered electors		9,849		3.84%
INC hold		Swing		

=== 1993 Assembly election ===
1993 Nagaland Legislative Assembly election: Jangpetkong
Party	Candidate	Votes	%	±%
INC	I. Imkong	6,281	71.50%	17.56%
NPF	Chubatemjen Ao	2,504	28.50%	−17.56%
Margin of victory		3,777	42.99%	35.13%
Turnout		8,785	92.75%	−2.79%
Registered electors		9,485		51.66%
INC hold		Swing	17.56%	

=== 1989 Assembly election ===
1989 Nagaland Legislative Assembly election: Jangpetkong
Party	Candidate	Votes	%	±%
INC	Chubatemjen Ao	3,201	53.93%	11.21%
NPF	I. Imkong	2,734	46.07%	
Margin of victory		467	7.87%	−4.88%
Turnout		5,935	95.54%	0.48%
Registered electors		6,254		0.61%
INC hold		Swing	11.21%	

=== 1987 Assembly election ===
1987 Nagaland Legislative Assembly election: Jangpetkong
Party	Candidate	Votes	%	±%
INC	Chubatemjen Ao	2,516	42.72%	−7.57%
Independent	Kiremwati	1,765	29.97%	
NND	I. Imkong	1,608	27.31%	−22.40%
Margin of victory		751	12.75%	12.16%
Turnout		5,889	95.06%	19.49%
Registered electors		6,216		−29.85%
INC hold		Swing	-7.57%	

=== 1982 Assembly election ===
1982 Nagaland Legislative Assembly election: Jangpetkong
Party	Candidate	Votes	%	±%
INC	I. Imkong	3,320	50.30%	
NND	Imchalemba Ao	3,281	49.70%	
Margin of victory		39	0.59%	−5.66%
Turnout		6,601	75.57%	−17.44%
Registered electors		8,861		65.22%
INC gain from UDA		Swing	8.96%	

=== 1977 Assembly election ===
1977 Nagaland Legislative Assembly election: Jangpetkong
Party	Candidate	Votes	%	±%
UDA	Imchalemba Ao	2,044	41.33%	18.73%
Independent	Arienba	1,735	35.09%	
Independent	Imdongensa	1,166	23.58%	
Margin of victory		309	6.25%	−8.87%
Turnout		4,945	93.01%	17.90%
Registered electors		5,363		−42.73%
UDA gain from Independent		Swing	3.61%	

=== 1974 Assembly election ===
1974 Nagaland Legislative Assembly election: Jangpetkong
Party	Candidate	Votes	%	±%
Independent	Imchalemba Ao	2,602	37.72%	
UDA	Arienba	1,559	22.60%	
Independent	Mayangtemba	1,161	16.83%	
NNO	Imsumeren	1,043	15.12%	−23.31%
Independent	Dangtimeren	533	7.73%	
Margin of victory		1,043	15.12%	12.69%
Turnout		6,898	75.11%	−0.54%
Registered electors		9,365		91.28%
Independent hold		Swing	-3.14%	

=== 1969 Assembly election ===
1969 Nagaland Legislative Assembly election: Jangpetkong
Party	Candidate	Votes	%	±%
Independent	I. Arienba	1,513	40.86%	
NNO	Imchalemba Ao	1,423	38.43%	
UDF	Tekasosang	767	20.71%	
Margin of victory		90	2.43%	
Turnout		3,703	75.65%	
Registered electors		4,896		
Independent hold		Swing		

=== 1966 Assembly by-election ===
1966 Nagaland Legislative Assembly by-election: Jangpetkong
Party	Candidate	Votes	%	±%
Independent	Imchalemba Ao	971		
Independent	Inkongwati Ao	12		
Margin of victory		959		
Independent hold		Swing		

=== 1964 Assembly election ===
1964 Nagaland Legislative Assembly election: Jangpetkong
Party	Candidate	Votes	%	±%
Independent	R. Lesen	1,867	80.96%	
Independent	Imtitoshi Lanu	439	19.04%	
Margin of victory		1,428	61.93%	
Turnout		2,306	72.19%	
Registered electors		3,200		
Independent win (new seat)				

== See also ==
- List of constituencies of the Nagaland Legislative Assembly
- Mokokchung district
