= Tuensang Sadar I Assembly constituency =

Legislative Assembly constituency in Nagaland State, India

Coordinates: 26.27°N 94.82°E

Tuensang Sadar I
- Constituency No. 53 for the Nagaland Legislative Assembly

Constituency details
- Country: India
- Region: Northeast India
- State: Nagaland
- District: Tuensag
- Lok Sabha constituency: Nagaland
- Established: 1974
- Total electors: 23,618
- Reservation: ST

Member of Legislative Assembly
- 14th Nagaland Legislative Assembly
- Incumbent P. Bashangmongba Chang
- Party: Bharatiya Janata Party
- Elected year: 2023

Tuensang Sadar I Legislative Assembly constituency is one of the 60 Legislative Assembly constituencies of Nagaland state in India.

It is part of Tuensang district and is reserved for candidates belonging to the Scheduled Tribes.

== Members of the Legislative Assembly ==
Year	Member	Picture	Party
1974	H. Saochang		Independent politician
1977	H. Saochang		Indian National Congress
1982	H. Saochang		Indian National Congress
1984 by-election	Changkong		Indian National Congress
1987	Changkong		Indian National Congress
1989	Changkong		Indian National Congress
1993	Changkong		Indian National Congress
1998	P. Chuba Chang		Independent politician
2003	P. Chuba Chang		Independent politician
2008	P. Chuba Chang		Indian National Congress
2013	Toyang Chang		Independent politician
2018	Toyang Chang		Naga People's Front
2023	P. Bashangmongba Chang		Bharatiya Janata Party

== Election results ==
=== 2023 Assembly election ===
2023 Nagaland Legislative Assembly election: Tuensang Sadar I
Party	Candidate	Votes	%	±%
BJP	P. Bashangmongba Chang	12,638	63.30%	
NCP	Toyang Chang	6,994	35.03%	
Independent	C. N. Yanchu Chang	287	1.44%	
NOTA	Nota	46	0.23%	
Margin of victory		5,644	28.27%	9.08%
Turnout		19,965	84.53%	5.92%
Registered electors		23,618		9.32%
BJP gain from NPF		Swing	3.91%	

=== 2018 Assembly election ===
2018 Nagaland Legislative Assembly election: Tuensang Sadar I
Party	Candidate	Votes	%	±%
NPF	Toyang Chang	10,087	59.39%	16.17%
NDPP	T. Mongko Chang	6,828	40.20%	
NOTA	None of the Above	70	0.41%	
Margin of victory		3,259	19.19%	5.67%
Turnout		16,985	78.62%	2.53%
Registered electors		21,605		−2.17%
NPF gain from Independent		Swing	2.65%	

=== 2013 Assembly election ===
2013 Nagaland Legislative Assembly election: Tuensang Sadar I
Party	Candidate	Votes	%	±%
Independent	Toyang Changkong Chang	9,534	56.74%	
NPF	L. Elam Chang	7,262	43.22%	23.47%
Margin of victory		2,272	13.52%	−19.19%
Turnout		16,803	76.09%	8.19%
Registered electors		22,084		−4.79%
Independent gain from INC		Swing	-1.87%	

=== 2008 Assembly election ===
2008 Nagaland Legislative Assembly election: Tuensang Sadar I
Party	Candidate	Votes	%	±%
INC	P. Chuba Chang	9,230	58.61%	21.91%
BJP	Nungsanglemba Chang	4,078	25.90%	19.23%
NPF	L. Elam Chang	3,110	19.75%	7.94%
Margin of victory		5,152	32.72%	32.11%
Turnout		15,748	70.79%	−26.27%
Registered electors		23,194		44.22%
INC gain from Independent		Swing	21.30%	

=== 2003 Assembly election ===
2003 Nagaland Legislative Assembly election: Tuensang Sadar I
Party	Candidate	Votes	%	±%
Independent	P. Chuba Chang	5,595	37.31%	
INC	Nungsang	5,504	36.70%	−5.99%
NPF	Sashi	1,771	11.81%	
NDM	K. Imlong Chang	1,127	7.51%	
BJP	Yongkonglemba	1,000	6.67%	
Margin of victory		91	0.61%	−14.00%
Turnout		14,997	94.17%	7.09%
Registered electors		16,082		12.46%
Independent hold		Swing	-10.32%	

=== 1998 Assembly election ===
1998 Nagaland Legislative Assembly election: Tuensang Sadar I
Party	Candidate	Votes	%	±%
Independent	P. Chuba Chang	7,017	57.31%	
INC	Changkong Chang	5,228	42.69%	−4.93%
Margin of victory		1,789	14.61%	−2.46%
Turnout		12,245	87.08%	4.54%
Registered electors		14,300		13.43%
Independent gain from INC		Swing	9.68%	

=== 1993 Assembly election ===
1993 Nagaland Legislative Assembly election: Tuensang Sadar I
Party	Candidate	Votes	%	±%
INC	Changkong Chang	4,918	47.63%	−12.02%
NPF	Kechingba Yimchunger	3,155	30.55%	−9.80%
Independent	Chusangchazo	2,253	21.82%	
Margin of victory		1,763	17.07%	−2.23%
Turnout		10,326	82.54%	0.25%
Registered electors		12,607		44.74%
INC hold		Swing	-12.02%	

=== 1989 Assembly election ===
1989 Nagaland Legislative Assembly election: Tuensang Sadar I
Party	Candidate	Votes	%	±%
INC	Changkong Chang	4,222	59.65%	10.47%
NPF	S. Khoney	2,856	40.35%	
Margin of victory		1,366	19.30%	−5.32%
Turnout		7,078	82.30%	−0.56%
Registered electors		8,710		0.20%
INC hold		Swing	10.47%	

=== 1987 Assembly election ===
1987 Nagaland Legislative Assembly election: Tuensang Sadar I
Party	Candidate	Votes	%	±%
INC	Changkong Chang	3,489	49.18%	
Independent	S. Khoney	1,742	24.55%	
NND	Kechingba Yimchunger	1,237	17.43%	
Independent	Yanchumong	627	8.84%	
Margin of victory		1,747	24.62%	
Turnout		7,095	82.86%	
Registered electors		8,693		
INC hold		Swing		

=== 1984 Assembly by-election ===
1984 Nagaland Legislative Assembly by-election: Tuensang Sadar I
Party	Candidate	Votes	%	±%
INC	Changkong Chang	4,850		
NND	C. Sangtam	3,845		
Margin of victory		1,005		
INC hold		Swing		

=== 1982 Assembly election ===
1982 Nagaland Legislative Assembly election: Tuensang Sadar I
Party	Candidate	Votes	%	±%
INC	H. Sao Chang	3,190	54.48%	11.46%
NND	Chiten Sangtam	2,665	45.52%	
Margin of victory		525	8.97%	0.76%
Turnout		5,855	52.66%	−26.22%
Registered electors		11,317		96.71%
INC hold		Swing	11.46%	

=== 1977 Assembly election ===
1977 Nagaland Legislative Assembly election: Tuensang Sadar I
Party	Candidate	Votes	%	±%
INC	H. Sao Chang	1,914	43.02%	
UDA	Chiten Sangtam	1,549	34.82%	19.75%
Independent	L. J. Toshi Sangtam	986	22.16%	
Margin of victory		365	8.20%	5.23%
Turnout		4,449	78.88%	32.37%
Registered electors		5,753		−30.12%
INC gain from Independent		Swing	10.07%	

=== 1974 Assembly election ===
1974 Nagaland Legislative Assembly election: Tuensang Sadar I
Party	Candidate	Votes	%	±%
Independent	H. Sao Chang	1,229	32.95%	
NNO	Chiten Sangtam	1,118	29.97%	
Independent	K. Asungba	821	22.01%	
UDA	Chingmakw Imlong	562	15.07%	
Margin of victory		111	2.98%	
Turnout		3,730	46.51%	
Registered electors		8,233		
Independent win (new seat)				

== See also ==
- List of constituencies of the Nagaland Legislative Assembly
- Tuensang district
