= Chubatoshi Apok Jamir =

Indian politician

C. Apok Jamir

Working President Nagaland Pradesh Congress Committee
- Incumbent
- Assumed office 1 November 2024

Member of Parliament, Rajya Sabha
- In office 1998–2004
- Preceded by: Vizol Koso
- Succeeded by: T. R. Zeliang
- Constituency: Nagaland

Member of the Nagaland Legislative Assembly
- In office 2013–2018
- Preceded by: Nungshizenba
- Succeeded by: Metsubo Jamir
- Constituency: Mokokchung Town
- In office 2004–2008
- Preceded by: S. C. Jamir
- Succeeded by: Nungshizenba
- Constituency: Aonglenden

Personal details
- Born: 26 April 1961 (age 64)
- Party: Indian National Congress
- Spouse: Amenla
- Parent(s): S. C. Jamir, Imkonglemla

Chubatoshi Apok Jamir is an Indian politician and working president of the Nagaland Pradesh Congress Committee. He was a Member of Parliament, representing Nagaland in the Rajya Sabha, the upper house of India's Parliament as a member of the Indian National Congress from 1998 to 2004. He also won the 2008 and 2013 elections for the Nagaland Legislative Assembly representing Mokokchung Town constituency.

== Political life ==
Jamir won the 2008 and 2013 elections for the Nagaland Legislative Assembly representing Mokokchung Town constituency.

In 2024, he was appointed the Working President of the Nagaland Pradesh Congress Committee.

== Personal life ==
Jamir is the son of former Nagaland Chief Minister S. C. Jamir.

== See also ==
- List of Rajya Sabha members from Nagaland
