= Moka Assembly constituency =

Legislative Assembly constituency in Nagaland State, India

Coordinates: 26.31°N 94.99°E

Moka
- Constituency No. 48 for the Nagaland Legislative Assembly

Constituency details
- Country: India
- Region: Northeast India
- State: Nagaland
- District: Mon
- Lok Sabha constituency: Nagaland
- Established: 1974
- Total electors: 18,039
- Reservation: ST

Member of Legislative Assembly
- 14th Nagaland Legislative Assembly
- Incumbent A. Nyamnyei Konyak
- Party: NPP
- Alliance: NDA
- Elected year: 2023

Moka is one of the 60 Legislative Assembly constituencies of Nagaland state in India.

It is part of Mon district and is reserved for candidates belonging to the Scheduled Tribes.

== Members of the Legislative Assembly ==
Year	Member	Party
1974	Anden	Nagaland Nationalist Organisation
1977	Manwai Awang	Independent politician
1982	A. Nyamnyei Konyak	Naga National Democratic Party
1987	A. Nyamnyei Konyak	Indian National Congress
1989	K. Kiko Konyak	Indian National Congress
1993	A. Nyamnyei Konyak	Indian National Congress
1998	A. Nyamnyei Konyak	Independent politician
2003	E. E. Pangteang	Naga People's Front
2008	E. E. Pangteang	Naga People's Front
2013	E. E. Pangteang	Naga People's Front
2018	E. E. Pangteang	Naga People's Front
2023	A. Nyamnyei Konyak	National People's Party

== Election results ==
=== 2023 Assembly election ===
2023 Nagaland Legislative Assembly election: Moka
Party	Candidate	Votes	%	±%
NPP	A. Nyamnyei Konyak	8,857	50.70%	
NDPP	E. E. Pangteang	8,301	47.51%	−1.91%
NPF	D. Yongnyak Konyak	288	1.65%	−48.75%
NOTA	Nota	25	0.14%	
Margin of victory		556	3.18%	2.21%
Turnout		17,471	96.85%	2.39%
Registered electors		18,039		11.76%
NPP gain from NPF		Swing	0.30%	

=== 2018 Assembly election ===
2018 Nagaland Legislative Assembly election: Moka
Party	Candidate	Votes	%	±%
NPF	E. E. Pangteang	7,684	50.40%	−14.17%
NDPP	K. Kiko Konyak	7,536	49.43%	
NOTA	None of the Above	27	0.18%	
Margin of victory		148	0.97%	−28.28%
Turnout		15,247	94.46%	−2.11%
Registered electors		16,141		−5.49%
NPF hold		Swing	-14.17%	

=== 2013 Assembly election ===
2013 Nagaland Legislative Assembly election: Moka
Party	Candidate	Votes	%	±%
NPF	E. E. Pangteang	10,649	64.56%	11.32%
INC	Longang	5,824	35.31%	−4.61%
Margin of victory		4,825	29.25%	15.93%
Turnout		16,494	96.57%	2.19%
Registered electors		17,079		3.96%
NPF hold		Swing	11.32%	

=== 2008 Assembly election ===
2008 Nagaland Legislative Assembly election: Moka
Party	Candidate	Votes	%	±%
NPF	E. E. Pangteang	8,256	53.24%	7.18%
INC	A. Nyamnyei Konyak	6,190	39.92%	6.13%
BJP	K. Kiko Konyak	1,139	7.35%	
Margin of victory		2,066	13.32%	1.05%
Turnout		15,507	94.86%	−5.04%
Registered electors		16,429		27.00%
NPF hold		Swing	7.18%	

=== 2003 Assembly election ===
2003 Nagaland Legislative Assembly election: Moka
Party	Candidate	Votes	%	±%
NPF	E. E. Pangteang	5,837	46.06%	
INC	A. Nyamnyei Konyak	4,282	33.79%	
NDM	P. Longang	2,554	20.15%	
Margin of victory		1,555	12.27%	
Turnout		12,673	99.43%	99.43%
Registered electors		12,936		8.51%
NPF gain from Independent		Swing	-8.89%	

=== 1998 Assembly election ===
1998 Nagaland Legislative Assembly election: Moka
Party	Candidate	Votes	%	±%
Independent	A. Nyamnyei Konyak	Unopposed		
Registered electors		11,921		−2.69%
Independent gain from INC		Swing		

=== 1993 Assembly election ===
1993 Nagaland Legislative Assembly election: Moka
Party	Candidate	Votes	%	±%
INC	A. Nyamnyei Konyak	6,684	54.95%	−6.56%
NPF	E. E. Pangteang	5,480	45.05%	6.56%
Margin of victory		1,204	9.90%	−13.12%
Turnout		12,164	99.58%	0.70%
Registered electors		12,250		46.27%
INC hold		Swing	-6.56%	

=== 1989 Assembly election ===
1989 Nagaland Legislative Assembly election: Moka
Party	Candidate	Votes	%	±%
INC	K. Kiko Konyak	5,064	61.51%	25.04%
NPF	A. Nyamnyei Konyak	3,169	38.49%	
Margin of victory		1,895	23.02%	20.85%
Turnout		8,233	98.88%	−0.02%
Registered electors		8,375		0.01%
INC hold		Swing	25.04%	

=== 1987 Assembly election ===
1987 Nagaland Legislative Assembly election: Moka
Party	Candidate	Votes	%	±%
INC	A. Nyamnyei Konyak	3,017	36.46%	27.76%
Independent	K. Kiko Konyak	2,838	34.30%	
NND	E. E. Pangteang	2,419	29.24%	−11.22%
Margin of victory		179	2.16%	−9.88%
Turnout		8,274	98.90%	9.22%
Registered electors		8,374		10.20%
INC gain from NND		Swing	-3.99%	

=== 1982 Assembly election ===
1982 Nagaland Legislative Assembly election: Moka
Party	Candidate	Votes	%	±%
NND	A. Nyamnyei Konyak	2,724	40.45%	
Independent	K. Kiko Konyak	1,913	28.41%	
Independent	Engopangtiang Konyak	1,511	22.44%	
INC	Awang Manwal	586	8.70%	
Margin of victory		811	12.04%	−2.34%
Turnout		6,734	89.68%	0.24%
Registered electors		7,599		36.40%
NND gain from Independent		Swing	-6.96%	

=== 1977 Assembly election ===
1977 Nagaland Legislative Assembly election: Moka
Party	Candidate	Votes	%	±%
Independent	Manwai Awang	2,304	47.41%	
UDA	Pangtiang	1,605	33.02%	6.14%
NCN	A. Nyamnyei Konyak	951	19.57%	
Margin of victory		699	14.38%	−9.05%
Turnout		4,860	89.45%	23.74%
Registered electors		5,571		−4.80%
Independent gain from NNO		Swing	-2.91%	

=== 1974 Assembly election ===
1974 Nagaland Legislative Assembly election: Moka
Party	Candidate	Votes	%	±%
NNO	Anden	1,840	50.31%	
UDA	S. Manwai	983	26.88%	
Independent	Akai	834	22.81%	
Margin of victory		857	23.43%	
Turnout		3,657	65.70%	
Registered electors		5,852		
NNO win (new seat)				

== See also ==
- List of constituencies of the Nagaland Legislative Assembly
- Mon district
