= Temjenmemba =

Indian politician (born 1974)

Temjenmemba (born 1974) is an Indian politician from Nagaland. He is an MLA from the Jangpetkong Assembly constituency, which is reserved for Scheduled Tribe community, in Mokokchung district. He won the 2023 Nagaland Legislative Assembly election, representing the Nationalist Democratic Progressive Party, which is now merged with the NPF.

== Early life and education ==
Temjenmemba is from Jangpetkong, Mokokchung, Nagaland. He is the son of the late Tekachang. He completed his M.A. in good governance, in 2011, at Global Open University, Dimapur, Nagaland.

== Career ==
Temjenmemba was elected from the Jangpetkong Assembly constituency representing the Nationalist Democratic Progressive Party in the 2023 Nagaland Legislative Assembly election. He polled 6,238 votes and defeated his nearest rival, Imjongwati Longkumer of the Naga People's Front, by a margin of 2,001 votes.
