= K. Konngam Konyak =

Indian politician

K. Konngam Konyak (born 1956) is an Indian politician from Nagaland. He is an MLA from the Phomching Assembly constituency, which is reserved for Scheduled Tribe community, in Mon district. He won the 2023 Nagaland Legislative Assembly election, representing the Bharatiya Janata Party.

== Early life and education ==
Konyak is from Phomching, Mon district, Nagaland. He is the son of the late Konwang Konyak. He studied Class 8 at Government High School, Jotsoma, and passed the Nagaland Board of School Education examinations in 1979.

== Career ==
Konyak was elected from the Phomching Assembly constituency, representing the Bharatiya Janata Party in the 2023 Nagaland Legislative Assembly election. He polled 9,803 votes and defeated his nearest rival and sitting MLA, Pohwang Konyak of the Nationalist Congress Party, by 2,877 votes. Earlier, he lost the 2018 Nagaland Legislative Assembly election on NPF ticket to Konyak by 632 votes.
