= C. Manpon Konyak =

Indian politician

C. Manpon Konyak (born 1981) is an Indian politician from Nagaland. He is an MLA from the Aboi Assembly constituency, which is reserved for Scheduled Tribe community, in Mon district. He won the 2023 Nagaland Legislative Assembly election, as an independent candidate.

== Early life and education ==
Konyak is from Aboi, Mon district, Nagaland. He is the son of Changkap. He completed his M.A. in sociology, in 2005, at Hemwati Nandan Bahuguna Garhwal University, Srinagar, Uttaranchal.

== Career ==
Konyak won the Aboi constituency as an independent candidate in the 2023 Nagaland assembly election. He polled 6,771 votes and defeated his nearest rival, Wangka Konyak of the Republican Party of India (Athawale), by 3,524 votes.
