= 1982 Nagaland Legislative Assembly election =

Legislative Assembly election in Nagaland, India

← 1977	10 November 1982	1987 →

All 60 seats in the Nagaland Legislative Assembly 31 seats needed for a majority
- Registered: 596,453
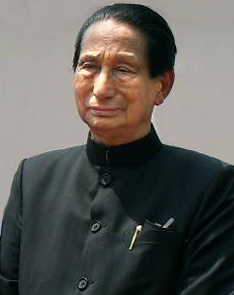
	Majority party	Minority party
		NND
Leader	S. C. Jamir	John Bosco Jasokie
Party	INC	NND
Leader's seat	Aonglenden	Kohima Town
Seats before	15
Seats won	24	24
Seat change	▲9	New
Popular vote	32.08%	32.01%
CM before election
John Bosco Jasokie
Naga National Democratic Party
Elected CM
S. C. Jamir
United Democratic Front—Progressive

Elections to the Nagaland Legislative Assembly were held in November 1982 to elect members of the 60 constituencies in Nagaland, India. The United Democratic Front—Progressive alliance, led by the Indian National Congress won the most seats and S. C. Jamir was appointed as the Chief Minister of Nagaland for his second term. The number of constituencies was set as 60 by the recommendation of the Delimitation Commission of India.

== Result ==
Party	Votes	%	Seats	+/–
Indian National Congress	140,420	32.08	24	▲9
Naga National Democratic Party	140,112	32.01	24	New
Independents	157,173	35.91	12	▲3
Total	437,705	100.00	60	0
Valid votes	437,705	98.59		
Invalid/blank votes	6,267	1.41		
Total votes	443,972	100.00		
Registered voters/turnout	596,453	74.44		
Source: ECI

=== Results by constituency ===
Winner, runner-up, voter turnout, and victory margin in every constituency
Assembly Constituency		Turnout	Winner				Runner Up				Margin
#k	Names	%	Candidate	Party	Votes	%	Candidate	Party	Votes	%	Margin
1	Dimapur I	48.55%	Md. Anwar Hussain	INC	4,554	41.67%	Chhlie Kevichhsa	NND	3,342	30.58%	1,212
2	Dimapur II	44.17%	I. Vikheshe	INC	4,854	35.77%	Lhomithi Sema	Independent	2,658	19.59%	2,196
3	Dimapur III	78.76%	Lolit Mech	INC	2,994	58.84%	Dabalal Mech	NND	991	19.48%	2,003
4	Ghaspani I	61.16%	Shikiho Sema	INC	3,665	26.31%	L. Hekiye Yeptho	Independent	2,681	19.25%	984
5	Ghaspani II	73.63%	Rokonicha	NND	3,590	39.25%	Langkam	INC	3,522	38.51%	68
6	Tening	89.88%	Henlum L. Singson	Independent	2,222	27.82%	C. R. Zeliang	NND	1,552	19.43%	670
7	Peren	74.47%	L. Lungalang	NND	3,954	51.63%	Longbe Neru	INC	2,468	32.22%	1,486
8	Western Angami	60.45%	Setu Lietise	NND	1,780	26.81%	N. T. Nakhro	Independent	1,099	16.55%	681
9	Kohima Town	49.78%	John Bosco Jasokie	NND	3,574	54.76%	Khyomo Lotha	INC	2,776	42.53%	798
10	Northern Angami I	66.73%	Dr. Shürhozelie Liezietsu	NND	2,189	32.76%	P. Vikuolie	Independent	1,405	21.03%	784
11	Northern Angami II	78.31%	Chupfuo	NND	2,620	30.76%	K. V. Keditsu	Independent	2,476	29.07%	144
12	Tseminyü	82.81%	R. S. Rengma	NND	2,104	26.59%	Nillo	Independent	2,039	25.76%	65
13	Pughoboto	84.98%	Huska Sumi	Independent	3,728	51.24%	Zhutovi	INC	2,387	32.81%	1,341
14	Southern Angami I	72.54%	Puse	Independent	2,338	47.22%	Vistonei K. Angami	NND	1,913	38.64%	425
15	Southern Angami II	80.08%	Vizadel Sakhrie	Independent	1,635	29.73%	Pusazo	Independent	1,481	26.93%	154
16	Pfütsero	66.71%	Thenucho	NND	2,310	39.61%	Lhiweshelo Mero	INC	1,933	33.14%	377
17	Chizami	87.59%	Zhovehu Lohe	Independent	1,892	28.27%	Soyio	NND	1,782	26.63%	110
18	Chozuba	83.40%	Vamuzo Phesao	NND	4,494	52.48%	Notsutso	INC	3,995	46.65%	499
19	Phek	74.90%	Vejoyi	NND	2,485	35.09%	Zachilhu Vadeo	Independent	2,204	31.12%	281
20	Meluri	83.52%	Chiekhutso	NND	3,373	53.12%	M. Asang Snock	INC	2,902	45.70%	471
21	Tuli	84.32%	I. Merachiba	INC	2,969	36.80%	T. Tali	NND	2,545	31.54%	424
22	Arkakong	76.35%	Marchiba	Independent	2,480	30.61%	R. C. Chiten Jamir	INC	2,361	29.14%	119
23	Impur	88.47%	Kariba	INC	3,944	39.08%	T. Chuba	NND	3,872	38.36%	72
24	Angetyongpang	70.34%	Sentichuba	NND	2,957	44.02%	Akumbenba	Independent	2,568	38.23%	389
25	Mongoya	65.36%	N. I. Jamir	INC	3,289	54.94%	Sentiyangba	NND	2,597	43.38%	692
26	Aonglenden	65.58%	S. C. Jamir	INC	3,212	57.56%	Kilangmeren	NND	2,308	41.36%	904
27	Mokokchung Town	57.82%	Takuyaba	NND	535	33.33%	I. Chuba	Independent	453	28.22%	82
28	Koridang	80.89%	Nokzenketba	Independent	2,025	25.32%	Dalle Nomo	NND	1,955	24.44%	70
29	Jangpetkong	75.57%	I. Imkong	INC	3,320	49.58%	Imchalemba Ao	NND	3,281	49.00%	39
30	Alongtaki	85.27%	Tiamaran	Independent	1,769	31.45%	Bendangtoshi Ao	INC	1,697	30.17%	72
31	Akuluto	86.48%	Khehoto	INC	1,861	35.88%	I. Vitokhe Sema	Independent	1,155	22.27%	706
32	Atoizu	82.33%	Kiyezhe L. Chishi	INC	1,852	27.04%	Khotoheo	NND	1,772	25.88%	80
33	Suruhoto	84.13%	Kiyozhe	Independent	1,608	22.38%	Khukivi Awomi	Independent	1,415	19.69%	193
34	Aghunato	89.29%	Kineto Hollehon	INC	1,980	33.97%	Akato	Independent	1,343	23.04%	637
35	Zünheboto	64.61%	Chutoshe	INC	1,757	28.77%	Vihoto	Independent	1,375	22.52%	382
36	Satakha	88.02%	Hokheto	NND	2,324	30.97%	Kaito	INC	2,028	27.03%	296
37	Tyüi	75.98%	T. A. Noullio	INC	3,437	43.47%	N. L. Odyuo	NND	3,029	38.31%	408
38	Wokha	61.22%	Mhao Lotha	NND	2,693	33.68%	Rainbow Ezung	INC	2,575	32.21%	118
39	Sanis	75.75%	T. Nchibemo Ngullie	Independent	3,680	46.53%	Mhonohan Murry	NND	2,265	28.64%	1,415
40	Bhandari	72.59%	E. Thungohamo Ezung	INC	3,311	40.43%	Tsenlamo Kikon	NND	3,216	39.27%	95
41	Tizit	92.53%	N. Yeangphong Konyak	INC	2,334	40.20%	P. K. Along	NND	1,654	28.49%	680
42	Wakching	93.64%	P. Ehyol	INC	3,123	42.82%	A. Shangkem Konyak	NND	2,146	29.42%	977
43	Tapi	92.96%	Noke Wangnao	NND	3,074	45.93%	Benja	INC	1,795	26.82%	1,279
44	Phomching	94.80%	Pohwang Konyak	NND	3,231	51.35%	Kongam	INC	2,948	46.85%	283
45	Tehok	97.66%	C. Nocklem Konyak	INC	3,827	50.84%	T. P. Manlen Konyak	NND	3,588	47.67%	239
46	Mon Town	86.75%	Yoktin Konyak	Independent	1,981	29.74%	Hoka	INC	1,421	21.33%	560
47	Aboi	94.91%	Eyong Konyak	Independent	2,171	39.24%	Khampei Konyak	Independent	1,174	21.22%	997
48	Moka	89.68%	A. Nyamnyei Konyak	NND	2,724	39.97%	K. Kiko Konyak	Independent	1,913	28.07%	811
49	Tamlu	98.04%	Bangjak Phom	INC	4,618	44.06%	N. Wokshing Phom	Independent	3,825	36.49%	793
50	Longleng	89.29%	Chenlom Phom	NND	4,462	37.49%	Chingko	Independent	2,672	22.45%	1,790
51	Noksen	82.19%	C. Chongshen Chang	INC	2,569	49.53%	I. L. Ghingmak	Independent	1,295	24.97%	1,274
52	Longkhim Chare	85.55%	Horangse Sangtam	NND	3,215	32.20%	T. Subengse Sangtam	INC	3,082	30.86%	133
53	Tuensang Sadar I	52.66%	H. Sao Chang	INC	3,190	53.52%	Chiten Sangtam	NND	2,665	44.71%	525
54	Tuensang Sadar II	73.54%	A. Lakimong Yimchunger	INC	1,866	27.38%	Yanchu Chang	Independent	1,483	21.76%	383
55	Tobu	85.81%	Sheakpong Konyak	INC	3,325	40.46%	Sopen Konyak	NND	2,871	34.93%	454
56	Noklak	77.85%	Thangpong	NND	1,662	23.85%	John	INC	1,328	19.06%	334
57	Thonoknyu	76.20%	P. Pongon	NND	2,280	28.52%	Khuno Khiamniongan	Independent	1,725	21.58%	555
58	Shamator–Chessore	73.55%	K. Zungkum Yimchunger	NND	3,255	44.20%	Yamakan Kichan	INC	2,524	34.27%	731
59	Seyochung–Sitimi	70.14%	Yopikyu Thongtsar	NND	3,290	39.98%	L. Kichingso	INC	2,673	32.48%	617
60	Pungro–Kiphire	67.10%	T. Rothrong	INC	2,770	33.43%	Torchu Yimchunger	Independent	2,531	30.55%	239

== See also ==
- List of constituencies of the Nagaland Legislative Assembly
- 1982 elections in India
