= Nuklutoshi =

Indian politician

Nuklutoshi Longkumer (born 1967) is an Indian politician from Nagaland. He is a three-time MLA from Arkakong Assembly constituency, which is reserved for Scheduled Tribe community, in Mokokchung district. He won the 2023 Nagaland Legislative Assembly election, representing the National People's Party.

== Early life and education ==
Nuklutoshi is from Arkakong, Mokokchung District, Nagaland. He is the son of the late Suzutemjen. He completed his B.Sc. in 1994 at a college affiliated with Manipur University.

== Career ==
Nuklutoshi won the Arkakong constituency, representing the National People's Party in the 2023 Nagaland Legislative Assembly election. He polled 9,387 votes and defeated his nearest rival and sitting MLA, Imnatiba of the Nationalist Democratic Progressive Party, by a margin of 3,029 votes. He became an MLA for the first time winning the 2008 Nagaland Legislative Assembly election representing the Naga People's Front. In 2008, he polled 9,035 votes and defeating his nearest rival, Takatiba Masa Ao of the Indian National Congress, by a margin of 580 votes. He retained the seat for the NPF, in the 2013 Nagaland Legislative Assembly election, again beating Masa Ao of the Congress, by a margin of 1,450 votes. However, he lost the 2018 Nagaland Legislative Assembly election to Imnatiba, by 793 votes. He regained the seat and became an MLA for the third time in the 2023 Assembly election.
