= Phomching Assembly constituency =

Legislative Assembly constituency in Nagaland State, India

Coordinates: 26.71°N 95.2°E

Phomching
- Constituency No. 44 for the Nagaland Legislative Assembly

Constituency details
- Country: India
- Region: Northeast India
- State: Nagaland
- District: Mon
- Lok Sabha constituency: Nagaland
- Established: 1974
- Total electors: 17,455
- Reservation: ST

Member of Legislative Assembly
- 14th Nagaland Legislative Assembly
- Incumbent K. Konngam Konyak
- Party: Bharatiya Janata Party
- Elected year: 2023

Phomching is one of the 60 Legislative Assembly constituencies of Nagaland state in India.

It is part of Mon district and is reserved for candidates belonging to the Scheduled Tribes.

== Members of the Legislative Assembly ==
Year	Member	Party
1974	Wanpen	Nagaland Nationalist Organisation
1977	Pohwang Konyak	United Democratic Alliance
1982	Pohwang Konyak	Naga National Democratic Party
1987	P. Pohwang	Indian National Congress
1989	Kongam	Indian National Congress
1993	Kongam	Indian National Congress
1998	Kongam	Indian National Congress
2003	Kongam	Indian National Congress
2008	Kongam	Indian National Congress
2013	Pohwang Konyak	Naga People's Front
2018	Pohwang Konyak	Nationalist Democratic Progressive Party
2023	K. Konngam Konyak	Bharatiya Janata Party

== Election results ==
=== 2023 Assembly election ===
2023 Nagaland Legislative Assembly election: Phomching
Party	Candidate	Votes	%	±%
BJP	K. Konngam Konyak	9,803	58.09%	
NCP	Pohwang Konyak	6,926	41.04%	
INC	T. Ngampai Konyak	84	0.50%	−1.06%
NOTA	Nota	51	0.30%	
NPF	H. Chingsak Konyak	11	0.07%	−40.41%
Margin of victory		2,877	17.05%	12.77%
Turnout		16,875	96.68%	7.22%
Registered electors		17,455		5.70%
BJP gain from NDPP		Swing	13.34%	

=== 2018 Assembly election ===
2018 Nagaland Legislative Assembly election: Phomching
Party	Candidate	Votes	%	±%
NDPP	Pohwang Konyak	6,611	44.75%	
NPF	K. Konngam Konyak	5,979	40.48%	−15.33%
NPP	H. Chingsak Konyak	1,725	11.68%	
INC	T. Ngampai Konyak	230	1.56%	−41.30%
NOTA	None of the Above	227	1.54%	
Margin of victory		632	4.28%	−8.68%
Turnout		14,772	89.46%	−7.50%
Registered electors		16,513		−14.89%
NDPP gain from NPF		Swing	-11.05%	

=== 2013 Assembly election ===
2013 Nagaland Legislative Assembly election: Phomching
Party	Candidate	Votes	%	±%
NPF	Pohwang Konyak	10,499	55.81%	48.73%
INC	K. Konngam Konyak	8,062	42.85%	−5.62%
BJP	Leiyang	232	1.23%	−41.57%
Margin of victory		2,437	12.95%	7.29%
Turnout		18,813	96.96%	4.16%
Registered electors		19,403		−0.85%
NPF gain from INC		Swing	7.34%	

=== 2008 Assembly election ===
2008 Nagaland Legislative Assembly election: Phomching
Party	Candidate	Votes	%	±%
INC	Kongam	8,802	48.47%	−10.80%
BJP	Pohwang Konyak	7,773	42.80%	
NPF	Wangpai	1,285	7.08%	−23.45%
LJP	Leiyang	373	2.05%	
Margin of victory		1,029	5.67%	−23.08%
Turnout		18,160	93.17%	−5.42%
Registered electors		19,569		19.89%
INC hold		Swing	-10.80%	

=== 2003 Assembly election ===
2003 Nagaland Legislative Assembly election: Phomching
Party	Candidate	Votes	%	±%
INC	Kongam	9,399	59.27%	
NPF	Pohwang Konyak	4,841	30.53%	
NDM	Wangpai	895	5.64%	
JD(U)	Leiyang	723	4.56%	
Margin of victory		4,558	28.74%	
Turnout		15,858	98.22%	98.22%
Registered electors		16,323		10.40%
INC hold		Swing	7.40%	

=== 1998 Assembly election ===
1998 Nagaland Legislative Assembly election: Phomching
Party	Candidate	Votes	%	±%
INC	Kongam	Unopposed		
Registered electors		14,785		3.34%
INC hold		Swing		

=== 1993 Assembly election ===
1993 Nagaland Legislative Assembly election: Phomching
Party	Candidate	Votes	%	±%
INC	Konngam	7,372	51.87%	−34.86%
NPF	Pohwang Konyak	6,840	48.13%	34.86%
Margin of victory		532	3.74%	−69.71%
Turnout		14,212	99.76%	41.63%
Registered electors		14,307		82.30%
INC hold		Swing	-34.86%	

=== 1989 Assembly election ===
1989 Nagaland Legislative Assembly election: Phomching
Party	Candidate	Votes	%	±%
INC	Konngam	3,940	86.73%	30.86%
NPF	P. Pohwang	603	13.27%	
Margin of victory		3,337	73.45%	61.73%
Turnout		4,543	58.13%	−40.09%
Registered electors		7,848		0.80%
INC hold		Swing	30.86%	

=== 1987 Assembly election ===
1987 Nagaland Legislative Assembly election: Phomching
Party	Candidate	Votes	%	±%
INC	P. Pohwang	4,226	55.86%	8.15%
NND	Konngam	3,339	44.14%	−8.15%
Margin of victory		887	11.73%	7.15%
Turnout		7,565	98.21%	3.41%
Registered electors		7,786		17.31%
INC gain from NND		Swing	3.57%	

=== 1982 Assembly election ===
1982 Nagaland Legislative Assembly election: Phomching
Party	Candidate	Votes	%	±%
NND	Pohwang Konyak	3,231	52.29%	
INC	Konngam	2,948	47.71%	11.13%
Margin of victory		283	4.58%	−4.67%
Turnout		6,179	94.80%	7.75%
Registered electors		6,637		17.08%
NND gain from UDA		Swing	6.46%	

=== 1977 Assembly election ===
1977 Nagaland Legislative Assembly election: Phomching
Party	Candidate	Votes	%	±%
UDA	Pohwang Konyak	2,170	45.83%	19.62%
INC	Wanpen	1,732	36.58%	
Independent	M. Minyong	449	9.48%	
NCN	P. Manangh	384	8.11%	
Margin of victory		438	9.25%	−9.03%
Turnout		4,735	87.05%	19.03%
Registered electors		5,669		15.39%
UDA gain from NNO		Swing	1.34%	

=== 1974 Assembly election ===
1974 Nagaland Legislative Assembly election: Phomching
Party	Candidate	Votes	%	±%
NNO	Wanpen	1,421	44.49%	
UDA	Powang	837	26.21%	
Independent	Thanglong Konyak	728	22.79%	
Independent	L. Atao Konyak	208	6.51%	
Margin of victory		584	18.28%	
Turnout		3,194	68.02%	
Registered electors		4,913		
NNO win (new seat)				

== See also ==
- List of constituencies of the Nagaland Legislative Assembly
- Mon district
