= Sanis Assembly constituency =

Legislative Assembly constituency in Nagaland State, India

Coordinates: 26.22°N 94.22°E

Sanis
- Constituency No. 39 for the Nagaland Legislative Assembly

Constituency details
- Country: India
- Region: Northeast India
- State: Nagaland
- District: Wokha
- Lok Sabha constituency: Nagaland
- Established: 1964
- Total electors: 24,051
- Reservation: ST

Member of Legislative Assembly
- 14th Nagaland Legislative Assembly
- Incumbent Mhathung Yanthan
- Party: NPF
- Alliance: NDA
- Elected year: 2023

Sanis is one of the 60 Legislative Assembly constituencies of Nagaland state in India.

It is part of Wokha district and is reserved for candidates belonging to the Scheduled Tribes.

== Members of the Legislative Assembly ==
Year	Member	Party
1964	Mhondamo Kithan	Independent politician
1969	Mhondamo Kithan	Nagaland Nationalist Organisation
1974	Mhonshan	Independent politician
1977	Mhonshan Murry	United Democratic Alliance
1982	T. Nchibemo Ngullie	Independent politician
1987	T. Nchibemo Ngullie	Indian National Congress
1989	T. Nchibemo Ngullie	Indian National Congress
1993	Y. Sulanthung H. Lotha	Democratic Labour Party
1998	Thomas Ngullie	Indian National Congress
2003	Nkhao Lotha	Naga People's Front
2008	Ralanthung Yanthan	Naga People's Front
2013	N. Thomas Lotha	Independent politician
2018	Mhathung Yanthan	Nationalist Democratic Progressive Party
2023	Mhathung Yanthan	Nationalist Democratic Progressive Party

== Election results ==
=== 2023 Assembly election ===
2023 Nagaland Legislative Assembly election: Sanis
Party	Candidate	Votes	%	±%
NDPP	Mhathung Yanthan	15,076	65.85%	15.88%
RJD	Senkathung Jami	5,563	24.30%	
NPF	Dr. Roland Lotha	1,754	7.66%	5.43%
LJP(RV)	Y. Sulanthung H Lotha	289	1.26%	
Independent	Mhonbemo	105	0.46%	
INC	Yanchamo Ovung	94	0.41%	
NOTA	Nota	15	0.07%	
Margin of victory		9,513	41.55%	27.38%
Turnout		22,896	95.20%	0.78%
Registered electors		24,051		7.58%
NDPP hold		Swing	15.88%	

=== 2018 Assembly election ===
2018 Nagaland Legislative Assembly election: Sanis
Party	Candidate	Votes	%	±%
NDPP	Mhathung Yanthan	10,548	49.97%	
JD(U)	Ramongo Lotha	7,556	35.79%	
NPP	Ralanthung Yanthan	1,997	9.46%	
NPF	Y. Renbomo Kikon	471	2.23%	−16.37%
LJP	Senkathung Jami	415	1.97%	
Independent	Y. Sulanthung H Lotha	92	0.44%	
NOTA	None of the Above	31	0.15%	
Margin of victory		2,992	14.17%	6.95%
Turnout		21,110	94.42%	−3.37%
Registered electors		22,357		0.65%
NDPP gain from Independent		Swing	17.82%	

=== 2013 Assembly election ===
2013 Nagaland Legislative Assembly election: Sanis
Party	Candidate	Votes	%	±%
Independent	N. Thomas Lotha	6,983	32.15%	
RJD	Nkhao Lotha	5,413	24.92%	9.11%
NPF	Ralanthung Yanthan	4,041	18.60%	−4.45%
BJP	Er. Senkathung Jami	2,758	12.70%	−5.50%
Independent	Mhonbemo Lotha	1,975	9.09%	
INC	Y. Sulanthung H.Lotha	524	2.41%	−8.05%
Margin of victory		1,570	7.23%	2.37%
Turnout		21,723	97.79%	3.22%
Registered electors		22,213		−5.32%
Independent gain from NPF		Swing	9.10%	

=== 2008 Assembly election ===
2008 Nagaland Legislative Assembly election: Sanis
Party	Candidate	Votes	%	±%
NPF	Ralanthung Yanthan	5,114	23.05%	−3.70%
BJP	T. L. Merry	4,037	18.19%	14.04%
NCP	Y. Sulanthung H. Lotha	3,979	17.93%	−8.62%
RJD	Nkhao Lotha	3,507	15.81%	
Independent	Y. Ekyimo Kikon	2,611	11.77%	
INC	N. Thomas Lotha	2,321	10.46%	1.73%
Margin of victory		1,077	4.85%	4.66%
Turnout		22,189	95.80%	−0.23%
Registered electors		23,461		15.10%
NPF hold		Swing	-3.70%	

=== 2003 Assembly election ===
2003 Nagaland Legislative Assembly election: Sanis
Party	Candidate	Votes	%	±%
NPF	Nkhao Lotha	5,168	26.75%	
NCP	Y. Sulanthung H. Lotha	5,131	26.55%	
NDM	T. L. Merry	3,285	17.00%	
JD(U)	Ekhyimo Kikon	2,176	11.26%	
INC	N. Thomas Lotha	1,687	8.73%	
BJP	Wobemo Yanthan	803	4.16%	
AITC	Thechamo	679	3.51%	
Nagaland Democratic Party	Roland Lotha	394	2.04%	
Margin of victory		37	0.19%	
Turnout		19,323	94.80%	94.80%
Registered electors		20,383		18.49%
NPF gain from INC		Swing	-3.09%	

=== 1998 Assembly election ===
1998 Nagaland Legislative Assembly election: Sanis
Party	Candidate	Votes	%	±%
INC	Thomas Ngullie	Unopposed		
Registered electors		17,203		44.19%
INC gain from Democratic Labour Party (India)		Swing		

=== 1993 Assembly election ===
1993 Nagaland Legislative Assembly election: Sanis
Party	Candidate	Votes	%	±%
Democratic Labour Party (India)	Y. Sulanthung H. Lotha	3,245	29.83%	
NPF	Nkhao Jami	2,938	27.01%	−10.19%
INC	T. Nchibemo Ngullie	2,743	25.22%	−16.21%
Independent	T. L. Merry	1,952	17.94%	
Margin of victory		307	2.82%	−1.40%
Turnout		10,878	92.68%	5.80%
Registered electors		11,931		42.54%
Democratic Labour Party (India) gain from INC		Swing	-11.59%	

=== 1989 Assembly election ===
1989 Nagaland Legislative Assembly election: Sanis
Party	Candidate	Votes	%	±%
INC	T. Nchibemo Ngullie	2,960	41.42%	1.40%
NPF	Nkhao Lotha	2,658	37.20%	
NPP	Rainbow Ezung	1,528	21.38%	
Margin of victory		302	4.23%	1.91%
Turnout		7,146	86.88%	5.63%
Registered electors		8,370		−0.74%
INC hold		Swing	1.40%	

=== 1987 Assembly election ===
1987 Nagaland Legislative Assembly election: Sanis
Party	Candidate	Votes	%	±%
INC	T. Nchibemo Ngullie	2,715	40.03%	15.56%
NND	Nkhoa	2,558	37.71%	8.94%
Independent	Rainbow Ezung	1,374	20.26%	
BJP	P. Pius	136	2.01%	
Margin of victory		157	2.31%	−15.66%
Turnout		6,783	81.25%	5.50%
Registered electors		8,432		−19.24%
INC gain from Independent		Swing	-6.73%	

=== 1982 Assembly election ===
1982 Nagaland Legislative Assembly election: Sanis
Party	Candidate	Votes	%	±%
Independent	T. Nchibemo Ngullie	3,680	46.75%	
NND	Mhonohan Murry	2,265	28.78%	
INC	Mhondambakothan	1,926	24.47%	
Margin of victory		1,415	17.98%	15.54%
Turnout		7,871	75.75%	−8.71%
Registered electors		10,441		40.39%
Independent gain from UDA		Swing	7.65%	

=== 1977 Assembly election ===
1977 Nagaland Legislative Assembly election: Sanis
Party	Candidate	Votes	%	±%
UDA	Mhonshan Murry	2,434	39.10%	23.30%
Independent	T. Nchibemo Ngullie	2,282	36.66%	
Independent	Wopansao	1,509	24.24%	
Margin of victory		152	2.44%	0.75%
Turnout		6,225	84.46%	−3.20%
Registered electors		7,437		25.54%
UDA gain from Independent		Swing	13.25%	

=== 1974 Assembly election ===
1974 Nagaland Legislative Assembly election: Sanis
Party	Candidate	Votes	%	±%
Independent	Mhonshan	1,330	25.85%	
Independent	T. Nchibemo Ngullie	1,243	24.16%	
UDA	Nsemo Ovung	813	15.80%	
NNO	Renchio	713	13.86%	−27.46%
Independent	Zumomo	414	8.05%	
Independent	B. Tsanbemomurry	252	4.90%	
Independent	Ramongo Lotha	191	3.71%	
Independent	Chenio Lotha	189	3.67%	
Margin of victory		87	1.69%	−0.10%
Turnout		5,145	87.66%	0.45%
Registered electors		5,924		77.79%
Independent gain from NNO		Swing	-15.47%	

=== 1969 Assembly election ===
1969 Nagaland Legislative Assembly election: Sanis
Party	Candidate	Votes	%	±%
NNO	Mhondamo Kithan	1,199	41.32%	
UDF	T. Nchibemo Ngullie	1,147	39.52%	
Independent	Zana Yanthan	556	19.16%	
Margin of victory		52	1.79%	−13.86%
Turnout		2,902	87.21%	4.23%
Registered electors		3,332		25.69%
NNO gain from Independent		Swing	-16.51%	

=== 1964 Assembly election ===
1964 Nagaland Legislative Assembly election: Sanis
Party	Candidate	Votes	%	±%
Independent	Mhodamo Kithan	1,267	57.83%	
Independent	Etssorhomo Ezung	924	42.17%	
Margin of victory		343	15.65%	
Turnout		2,191	82.99%	
Registered electors		2,651		
Independent win (new seat)				

== See also ==
- List of constituencies of the Nagaland Legislative Assembly
- Wokha district
