= Jacob Zhimomi =

Indian politician

Jacob Zhimomi is a Bharatiya Janata Party politician from Nagaland. He has been consecutively elected to the Nagaland Legislative Assembly from Ghaspani I since 2013. He is currently serving as the Minister of Public Health Engineering Department (PHED) and Cooperation in the Fifth Neiphiu Rio ministry since 2023 in Nagaland. Jacob Zhimomi is the son of Ihezhe Zhimomi, a native of the Aghunato Sub-division of Zünheboto District, who was a former politician and member of the First Nagaland Legislative Assembly. He is also a Sümi Naga.
