= Arkakong Assembly constituency =

Legislative Assembly constituency in Nagaland State, India

Coordinates: 26.47°N 94.63°E

Arkakong
- Constituency No. 22 for the Nagaland Legislative Assembly

Constituency details
- Country: India
- Region: Northeast India
- State: Nagaland
- District: Mokokchung
- Lok Sabha constituency: Nagaland
- Established: 1964
- Total electors: 19,479
- Reservation: ST

Member of Legislative Assembly
- 14th Nagaland Legislative Assembly
- Incumbent Nuklutoshi Longkümer
- Party: NPP
- Alliance: NDA
- Elected year: 2023

Arkakong is one of the 60 Legislative Assembly constituencies of Nagaland state in India.

It is part of Mokokchung district and is reserved for candidates belonging to the Scheduled Tribes.

== Members of the Legislative Assembly ==
Year	Member	Party
1964	R. C. Chiten Jamir	Independent politician
1969	R. C. Chiten Jamir	Nagaland Nationalist Organisation
1974	R. C. Chiten Jamir	Nagaland Nationalist Organisation
1977	Tsukjemwati	United Democratic Alliance
1982	Marchiba	Independent politician
1987	Jongpongchiten	Indian National Congress
1989	Jongpongchiten	Indian National Congress
1993	Soalemba	Indian National Congress
1998	Imtiyanger	Indian National Congress
2003	Takatiba Masa Ao	Indian National Congress
2008	Nuklutoshi	Naga People's Front
2013	Nuklutoshi	Naga People's Front
2018	Imnatiba	National People's Party
2023	Nuklutoshi	National People's Party

== Election results ==
=== 2023 Assembly election ===
2023 Nagaland Legislative Assembly election: Arkakong
Party	Candidate	Votes	%	±%
NPP	Nuklutoshi	9,387	53.36%	9.45%
NDPP	Imnatiba	8,184	46.52%	40.16%
NOTA	Nota	21	0.12%	
Margin of victory		1,203	6.84%	1.32%
Turnout		17,592	90.31%	2.61%
Registered electors		19,479		18.93%
NPP hold		Swing	9.45%	

=== 2018 Assembly election ===
2018 Nagaland Legislative Assembly election: Arkakong
Party	Candidate	Votes	%	±%
NPP	Imnatiba	6,307	43.91%	
NPF	Nuklutoshi	5,514	38.39%	−16.22%
Independent	K. Temjen Jamir	1,576	10.97%	
NDPP	Mangyang Lima	914	6.36%	
NOTA	None of the Above	53	0.37%	
Margin of victory		793	5.52%	−3.75%
Turnout		14,364	87.70%	−6.45%
Registered electors		16,379		−1.43%
NPP gain from NPF		Swing	-10.70%	

=== 2013 Assembly election ===
2013 Nagaland Legislative Assembly election: Arkakong
Party	Candidate	Votes	%	±%
NPF	Nuklutoshi	8,544	54.61%	9.13%
INC	Takatiba Masa Ao	7,094	45.34%	2.78%
Margin of victory		1,450	9.27%	6.35%
Turnout		15,645	94.15%	7.94%
Registered electors		16,617		−27.88%
NPF hold		Swing	9.13%	

=== 2008 Assembly election ===
2008 Nagaland Legislative Assembly election: Arkakong
Party	Candidate	Votes	%	±%
NPF	Nuklutoshi	9,035	45.48%	−2.81%
INC	Takatiba Masa Ao	8,455	42.56%	−8.96%
Independent	O. Lanutoshi Ao	2,411	12.14%	
Margin of victory		580	2.92%	−0.31%
Turnout		19,864	86.38%	−13.45%
Registered electors		23,040		48.81%
NPF gain from INC		Swing	-6.04%	

=== 2003 Assembly election ===
2003 Nagaland Legislative Assembly election: Arkakong
Party	Candidate	Votes	%	±%
INC	Takatiba Masa Ao	7,950	51.52%	
NPF	Imtiyanger	7,452	48.29%	
Margin of victory		498	3.23%	
Turnout		15,431	99.66%	−0.03%
Registered electors		15,483		13.95%
INC hold		Swing	-3.75%	

=== 1998 Assembly election ===
1998 Nagaland Legislative Assembly election: Arkakong
Party	Candidate	Votes	%	±%
INC	Imtiyanger	Unopposed		
Registered electors		13,587		14.23%
INC hold		Swing		

=== 1993 Assembly election ===
1993 Nagaland Legislative Assembly election: Arkakong
Party	Candidate	Votes	%	±%
INC	Soalemba	6,552	55.27%	5.67%
Independent	M. Pongener	5,297	44.68%	
Margin of victory		1,255	10.59%	−4.29%
Turnout		11,855	99.70%	2.91%
Registered electors		11,894		36.31%
INC hold		Swing	5.67%	

=== 1989 Assembly election ===
1989 Nagaland Legislative Assembly election: Arkakong
Party	Candidate	Votes	%	±%
INC	Jongpongchiten	4,175	49.60%	5.98%
NPF	Marchiba	2,923	34.72%	
Independent	Tsukjemwati	1,320	15.68%	
Margin of victory		1,252	14.87%	0.29%
Turnout		8,418	96.79%	−2.00%
Registered electors		8,726		0.17%
INC hold		Swing	5.98%	

=== 1987 Assembly election ===
1987 Nagaland Legislative Assembly election: Arkakong
Party	Candidate	Votes	%	±%
INC	Jongpongchiten	3,747	43.62%	14.24%
NPP	Marchiba	2,494	29.03%	
NND	Chubalemla	2,350	27.35%	−2.01%
Margin of victory		1,253	14.59%	13.10%
Turnout		8,591	98.79%	22.45%
Registered electors		8,711		−17.91%
INC gain from Independent		Swing	12.76%	

=== 1982 Assembly election ===
1982 Nagaland Legislative Assembly election: Arkakong
Party	Candidate	Votes	%	±%
Independent	Marchiba	2,480	30.85%	
INC	R. C. Chiten Jamir	2,361	29.37%	6.65%
NND	Tsukjeuwati	2,360	29.36%	
Independent	Imtiwati	837	10.41%	
Margin of victory		119	1.48%	−11.48%
Turnout		8,038	76.35%	−16.02%
Registered electors		10,611		91.60%
Independent gain from UDA		Swing	-4.84%	

=== 1977 Assembly election ===
1977 Nagaland Legislative Assembly election: Arkakong
Party	Candidate	Votes	%	±%
UDA	Tsukjemwati	1,806	35.69%	−13.24%
INC	R. C. Chiten Jamir	1,150	22.73%	
Independent	Noklen	1,020	20.16%	
Independent	Latongwati	456	9.01%	
Independent	I. Suzumar Imsong	368	7.27%	
NCN	Imtiwati	260	5.14%	
Margin of victory		656	12.96%	10.83%
Turnout		5,060	92.36%	7.83%
Registered electors		5,538		−32.64%
UDA gain from NNO		Swing	-15.37%	

=== 1974 Assembly election ===
1974 Nagaland Legislative Assembly election: Arkakong
Party	Candidate	Votes	%	±%
NNO	R. C. Chiten Jamir	3,521	51.07%	19.40%
UDA	Tsukjeuwati	3,374	48.93%	
Margin of victory		147	2.13%	1.08%
Turnout		6,895	84.53%	1.22%
Registered electors		8,222		71.15%
NNO hold		Swing	19.40%	

=== 1969 Assembly election ===
1969 Nagaland Legislative Assembly election: Arkakong
Party	Candidate	Votes	%	±%
NNO	R. C. Chiten Jamir	1,267	31.67%	
UDF	Noklen Jamir	1,225	30.62%	
Independent	Tsukjemwati	1,012	25.29%	
Independent	Imtimeren	497	12.42%	
Margin of victory		42	1.05%	
Turnout		4,001	83.31%	83.31%
Registered electors		4,804		63.07%
NNO gain from Independent		Swing		

=== 1964 Assembly election ===
1964 Nagaland Legislative Assembly election: Arkakong
Party	Candidate	Votes	%	±%
Independent	R. C. Chiten Jamir	Unopposed		
Registered electors		2,946		
Independent win (new seat)				

== See also ==
- List of constituencies of the Nagaland Legislative Assembly
- Mokokchung district
