= Meluri Assembly constituency =

Legislative Assembly constituency in Nagaland State, India

Coordinates: 25.68°N 94.62°E

Meluri
- Constituency No. 20 for the Nagaland Legislative Assembly

Constituency details
- Country: India
- Region: Northeast India
- State: Nagaland
- District: Phek
- Lok Sabha constituency: Nagaland
- Established: 1964
- Total electors: 20,628
- Reservation: ST

Member of Legislative Assembly
- 14th Nagaland Legislative Assembly
- Incumbent Z. Nyusietho Nyuthe
- Party: NPF
- Alliance: NDA
- Elected year: 2023

Meluri is one of the 60 Legislative Assembly constituencies of Nagaland state in India.

It is part of Phek district and is reserved for candidates belonging to the Scheduled Tribes.

== Members of the Legislative Assembly ==
Year	Member	Party
1964	Amon	Independent politician
1969	Marhutho	United Front of Nagaland
1974	Rasutho	United Democratic Alliance
1977	Chekhutso	United Democratic Alliance
1982	Chiekhutso	Naga National Democratic Party
1987	Chiekhutso	Naga National Democratic Party
1989	Khuosatho	Indian National Congress
1993	Zutsepa Katiry	Naga People's Front
1998	Khuosatho	Indian National Congress
2003	Yitachu	Naga People's Front
2008	Yitachu	Naga People's Front
2013	Yitachu	Naga People's Front
2018	Yitachu	Naga People's Front
2023	Z. Nyusietho Nyuthe	Nationalist Democratic Progressive Party

== Election results ==
=== 2023 Assembly election ===
2023 Nagaland Legislative Assembly election: Meluri
Party	Candidate	Votes	%	±%
NDPP	Z. Nyusietho Nyuthe	11,256	58.04%	10.72%
LJP(RV)	Yitachu	7,676	39.58%	
NPF	S. Akho Leyri	304	1.57%	−46.20%
RJD	Hopeson Snock	102	0.53%	
NOTA	Nota	55	0.28%	
Margin of victory		3,580	18.46%	18.01%
Turnout		19,393	93.01%	0.75%
Registered electors		20,851		15.91%
NDPP gain from NPF		Swing	10.27%	

=== 2018 Assembly election ===
2018 Nagaland Legislative Assembly election: Meluri
Party	Candidate	Votes	%	±%
NPF	Yitachu	7,928	47.77%	−16.80%
NDPP	Z. Nyusietho Nyuthe	7,854	47.32%	
NPP	M. Hopeson Snock	619	3.73%	
NOTA	None of the Above	195	1.17%	
Margin of victory		74	0.45%	−29.35%
Turnout		16,596	92.26%	−3.04%
Registered electors		17,989		−7.99%
NPF hold		Swing	-16.80%	

=== 2013 Assembly election ===
2013 Nagaland Legislative Assembly election: Meluri
Party	Candidate	Votes	%	±%
NPF	Yitachu	12,030	64.57%	6.61%
INC	Khuosatho	6,479	34.78%	−7.87%
Independent	S. Akho Leyri	120	0.64%	
Margin of victory		5,551	29.79%	14.48%
Turnout		18,631	95.29%	4.48%
Registered electors		19,551		−7.46%
NPF hold		Swing	6.61%	

=== 2008 Assembly election ===
2008 Nagaland Legislative Assembly election: Meluri
Party	Candidate	Votes	%	±%
NPF	Yitachu	11,121	57.96%	16.59%
INC	Penthu	8,183	42.65%	6.67%
JD(S)	Zutsepa Katiry	36	0.19%	
Margin of victory		2,938	15.31%	9.91%
Turnout		19,187	91.54%	−6.54%
Registered electors		21,127		53.13%
NPF hold		Swing	16.59%	

=== 2003 Assembly election ===
2003 Nagaland Legislative Assembly election: Meluri
Party	Candidate	Votes	%	±%
NPF	Yitachu	5,557	41.37%	
INC	Khuosatho	4,832	35.97%	−38.44%
RLD	S. Supong	1,649	12.28%	
BJP	P. K. T. Marhutho	1,394	10.38%	
Margin of victory		725	5.40%	−43.43%
Turnout		13,432	97.35%	5.15%
Registered electors		13,797		11.28%
NPF gain from INC		Swing	-0.74%	

=== 1998 Assembly election ===
1998 Nagaland Legislative Assembly election: Meluri
Party	Candidate	Votes	%	±%
INC	Khuosatho	7,001	74.42%	35.63%
Independent	Wetetso	2,407	25.58%	
Margin of victory		4,594	48.83%	45.51%
Turnout		9,408	76.75%	−15.46%
Registered electors		12,398		4.34%
INC gain from NPF		Swing	32.31%	

=== 1993 Assembly election ===
1993 Nagaland Legislative Assembly election: Meluri
Party	Candidate	Votes	%	±%
NPF	Zutsepa Katiry	4,589	42.11%	7.00%
INC	Khuosatho	4,227	38.79%	−3.70%
Independent	M. Asang Snock	2,082	19.10%	
Margin of victory		362	3.32%	−4.06%
Turnout		10,898	92.21%	−2.35%
Registered electors		11,882		47.40%
NPF gain from INC		Swing	-0.38%	

=== 1989 Assembly election ===
1989 Nagaland Legislative Assembly election: Meluri
Party	Candidate	Votes	%	±%
INC	Khuosatho	3,206	42.49%	18.87%
NPF	Chiekhutso	2,649	35.10%	
NPP	Thungchamo	1,691	22.41%	11.99%
Margin of victory		557	7.38%	0.32%
Turnout		7,546	94.55%	3.20%
Registered electors		8,061		0.14%
INC gain from NND		Swing	5.97%	

=== 1987 Assembly election ===
1987 Nagaland Legislative Assembly election: Meluri
Party	Candidate	Votes	%	±%
NND	Chiekhutso	2,673	36.51%	−17.24%
Independent	Asang	2,156	29.45%	
INC	Rasutho	1,729	23.62%	−22.63%
NPP	Thungchamo	763	10.42%	
Margin of victory		517	7.06%	−0.44%
Turnout		7,321	91.35%	7.83%
Registered electors		8,050		5.88%
NND hold		Swing	-17.24%	

=== 1982 Assembly election ===
1982 Nagaland Legislative Assembly election: Meluri
Party	Candidate	Votes	%	±%
NND	Chiekhutso	3,373	53.75%	
INC	M. Asang Snock	2,902	46.25%	
Margin of victory		471	7.51%	3.02%
Turnout		6,275	83.52%	−6.91%
Registered electors		7,603		29.72%
NND gain from UDA		Swing	19.65%	

=== 1977 Assembly election ===
1977 Nagaland Legislative Assembly election: Meluri
Party	Candidate	Votes	%	±%
UDA	Chekhutso	1,794	34.11%	7.65%
Independent	P. K. T. Marhutho	1,558	29.62%	
Independent	Thungchamo	1,433	27.24%	
Independent	Rasutho	341	6.48%	
Independent	Khapi	102	1.94%	
Independent	Rukohol	32	0.61%	
Margin of victory		236	4.49%	3.01%
Turnout		5,260	90.43%	5.06%
Registered electors		5,861		2.57%
UDA hold		Swing	7.65%	

=== 1974 Assembly election ===
1974 Nagaland Legislative Assembly election: Meluri
Party	Candidate	Votes	%	±%
UDA	Rasutho	1,250	26.46%	
NNO	Marhutho	1,180	24.97%	3.49%
Independent	Thungchamo	1,160	24.55%	
Independent	Shevohu	804	17.02%	
Independent	Vekhuhu	331	7.01%	
Margin of victory		70	1.48%	−7.16%
Turnout		4,725	85.37%	−0.67%
Registered electors		5,714		60.78%
UDA gain from UDF		Swing	-8.65%	

=== 1969 Assembly election ===
1969 Nagaland Legislative Assembly election: Meluri
Party	Candidate	Votes	%	±%
UDF	Marhutho	1,072	35.10%	
Independent	Moses	808	26.46%	
NNO	Thungchamo	656	21.48%	
Independent	Kerengulo	518	16.96%	
Margin of victory		264	8.64%	
Turnout		3,054	86.04%	86.04%
Registered electors		3,554		19.10%
UDF gain from Independent		Swing		

=== 1964 Assembly election ===
1964 Nagaland Legislative Assembly election: Meluri
Party	Candidate	Votes	%	±%
Independent	Amon	Unopposed		
Registered electors		2,984		
Independent win (new seat)				

== See also ==
- List of constituencies of the Nagaland Legislative Assembly
- Meluri District
