= Aonglenden Assembly constituency =

Legislative constituency in Nagaland State, India

Coordinates: 26.29°N 94.49°E

Aonglenden
- Constituency No. 26 for the Nagaland Legislative Assembly

Constituency details
- Country: India
- Region: Northeast India
- State: Nagaland
- District: Mokokchung
- Lok Sabha constituency: Nagaland
- Established: 1964
- Total electors: 12,491
- Reservation: ST

Member of Legislative Assembly
- 14th Nagaland Legislative Assembly
- Incumbent Sharingain Longkumer
- Party: NPF
- Alliance: NDA
- Elected year: 2023

Aonglenden is one of the 60 Legislative Assembly constituencies of Nagaland state in India. It is part of Mokokchung district and is reserved for candidates belonging to the Scheduled Tribes. It falls under Nagaland Lok Sabha constituency.

== Members of the Legislative Assembly ==
Year	Member	Party
1964	Imsumeren	Independent
1966★	J. Maputemjen	Independent
1969	Bendangangshi	United Front of Nagaland
1974	Chubatoshi	United Democratic Front
1977	S. C. Jamir	United Democratic Front
1982	S. C. Jamir	Indian National Congress
1987	Nungshizenba	Indian National Congress
1989	Nungshizenba	Indian National Congress
1993	Nungshizenba	Indian National Congress
1998	S. C. Jamir	Indian National Congress
2003	S. C. Jamir	Indian National Congress
2004★	C. Apok Jamir	Indian National Congress
2008	Nungshizenba	Indian National Congress
2011★	Toshipokba	Nagaland People's Front
2013	Imtikumzuk Longkumer	Indian National Congress
2018	Imtikumzuk Longkumer	Nationalist Democratic Progressive Party
2019★	Sharingain Longkumer	Nationalist Democratic Progressive Party
2023	Sharingain Longkumer	Nationalist Democratic Progressive Party

★by-election

== Election results ==
=== 2023 Assembly election ===
2023 Nagaland Legislative Assembly election: Aonglenden
Party	Candidate	Votes	%	±%
NDPP	Sharingain Longkümer	7,363	71.90%	▼10.17%
INC	Toshipokba	2,843	27.76%	▲5.24%
NOTA	Nota	35	0.34%	
Margin of victory		4,520	44.14%	−15.41%
Turnout		10,241	81.99%	−2.04%
Registered electors		12,491		0.07%
NDPP hold		Swing	-10.17%	

=== 2019 Assembly by-election ===
2019 Nagaland Legislative Assembly by-election: Aonglenden
Party	Candidate	Votes	%	±%
NDPP	Sharingain Longkumer	8,607	82.07%	31.83%
INC	Alem Jongshi	2,362	22.52%	
NOTA	None of the Above	28	0.27%	
Margin of victory		6,245	59.54%	58.70%
Turnout		10,488	83.80%	−1.39%
Registered electors		12,482		2.88%
NDPP hold		Swing	31.83%	

=== 2018 Assembly election ===
2018 Nagaland Legislative Assembly election: Aonglenden
Party	Candidate	Votes	%	±%
NDPP	Imtikümzük Longkümer	5,206	50.24%	
NPF	Toshipokba	5,118	49.39%	4.22%
NOTA	None of the Above	39	0.38%	
Margin of victory		88	0.85%	−8.62%
Turnout		10,363	85.42%	−0.42%
Registered electors		12,132		1.53%
NDPP gain from INC		Swing	-4.40%	

=== 2013 Assembly election ===
2013 Nagaland Legislative Assembly election: Aonglenden
Party	Candidate	Votes	%	±%
INC	Imtikümzük Longkümer	5,604	54.64%	10.52%
NPF	Toshipokba	4,633	45.17%	−10.72%
Margin of victory		971	9.47%	−2.31%
Turnout		10,257	85.84%	−1.98%
Registered electors		11,949		−6.69%
INC gain from NPF		Swing	-1.25%	

=== 2011 Assembly by-election ===
2011 Nagaland Legislative Assembly by-election: Aonglenden
Party	Candidate	Votes	%	±%
NPF	Toshipokba	6,265	55.89%	32.44%
INC	S. C. Jamir	4,945	44.11%	−4.89%
Margin of victory		1,320	11.78%	−5.44%
Turnout		11,210	87.82%	11.84%
Registered electors		12,806		4.44%
NPF gain from INC		Swing	-14.93%	

=== 2008 Assembly election ===
2008 Nagaland Legislative Assembly election: Aonglenden
Party	Candidate	Votes	%	±%
INC	Nungshizenba	4,380	49.00%	−21.82%
Independent	Imtikümzük Longkümer	2,841	31.78%	
NPF	Toshipokba	2,096	23.45%	−5.73%
Margin of victory		1,539	17.22%	−24.42%
Turnout		8,939	75.98%	−15.14%
Registered electors		12,262		17.36%
INC hold		Swing	-21.82%	

=== 2004 Assembly by-election ===
2004 Nagaland Legislative Assembly by-election: Aonglenden
Party	Candidate	Votes	%	±%
INC	Chubatoshi Apok Jamir	6,742	70.82%	−19.26%
NPF	Alempokba	2,778	29.18%	19.59%
Margin of victory		3,964	41.64%	−38.85%
Turnout		9,520	91.12%	−4.58%
Registered electors		10,448		2.64%
INC hold		Swing	-19.26%	

=== 2003 Assembly election ===
2003 Nagaland Legislative Assembly election: Aonglenden
Party	Candidate	Votes	%	±%
INC	S. C. Jamir	8,714	90.08%	
NPF	Chubalemla	928	9.59%	
Margin of victory		7,786	80.48%	
Turnout		9,674	95.70%	95.70%
Registered electors		10,179		11.33%
INC hold		Swing		

=== 1998 Assembly election ===
1998 Nagaland Legislative Assembly election: Aonglenden
Party	Candidate	Votes	%	±%
INC	S. C. Jamir	Unopposed		
Registered electors		9,143		0.27%
INC hold		Swing		

=== 1993 Assembly election ===
1993 Nagaland Legislative Assembly election: Aonglenden
Party	Candidate	Votes	%	±%
INC	Nungshizenba	6,157	74.15%	−18.40%
NPF	Bendangnukshi	2,146	25.85%	18.40%
Margin of victory		4,011	48.31%	−36.81%
Turnout		8,303	91.45%	−3.65%
Registered electors		9,118		26.78%
INC hold		Swing	-18.40%	

=== 1989 Assembly election ===
1989 Nagaland Legislative Assembly election: Aonglenden
Party	Candidate	Votes	%	±%
INC	Nungshizenba	6,293	92.56%	32.44%
NPF	Alichiba	506	7.44%	
Margin of victory		5,787	85.12%	64.48%
Turnout		6,799	95.09%	9.07%
Registered electors		7,192		0.21%
INC hold		Swing	32.44%	

=== 1987 Assembly election ===
1987 Nagaland Legislative Assembly election: Aonglenden
Party	Candidate	Votes	%	±%
INC	Nungshizenba	3,686	60.12%	1.93%
NND	M. Bendangnukshi	2,421	39.49%	−2.32%
Margin of victory		1,265	20.63%	4.26%
Turnout		6,131	86.02%	20.45%
Registered electors		7,177		−15.65%
INC hold		Swing	1.93%	

=== 1982 Assembly election ===
1982 Nagaland Legislative Assembly election: Aonglenden
Party	Candidate	Votes	%	±%
INC	S. C. Jamir	3,212	58.19%	
NND	Kilangmeren	2,308	41.81%	
Margin of victory		904	16.38%	−9.41%
Turnout		5,520	65.58%	−17.48%
Registered electors		8,509		62.73%
INC gain from UDA		Swing	-4.70%	

=== 1977 Assembly election ===
1977 Nagaland Legislative Assembly election: Aonglenden
Party	Candidate	Votes	%	±%
UDA	S. C. Jamir	2,688	62.89%	16.24%
NCN	I. Bendang	1,586	37.11%	
Margin of victory		1,102	25.78%	9.88%
Turnout		4,274	83.06%	11.84%
Registered electors		5,229		−20.48%
UDA hold		Swing	16.24%	

=== 1974 Assembly election ===
1974 Nagaland Legislative Assembly election: Aonglenden
Party	Candidate	Votes	%	±%
UDA	Chubatoshi	2,148	46.66%	
Independent	Bendamgangshi	1,416	30.76%	
NNO	Kilangmeren	1,040	22.59%	12.36%
Margin of victory		732	15.90%	15.69%
Turnout		4,604	71.21%	−18.16%
Registered electors		6,576		56.05%
UDA gain from UDF		Swing	20.01%	

=== 1969 Assembly election ===
1969 Nagaland Legislative Assembly election: Aonglenden
Party	Candidate	Votes	%	±%
UDF	Bendangangshi	1,003	26.65%	
Independent	Kilangmeren	995	26.43%	
Independent	Imtiwati	827	21.97%	
NNO	Maputemjen	385	10.23%	
Independent	Akangtenjen	310	8.24%	
Independent	Sosangtemjen	244	6.48%	
Margin of victory		8	0.21%	
Turnout		3,764	89.37%	
Registered electors		4,214		
UDF gain from Independent		Swing		

=== 1966 Assembly by-election ===
1966 Nagaland Legislative Assembly by-election: Aonglenden
Party	Candidate	Votes	%	±%
Independent	J. Maputemjen	Unopposed		
Independent hold		Swing		

=== 1964 Assembly election ===
1964 Nagaland Legislative Assembly election: Aonglenden
Party	Candidate	Votes	%	±%
Independent	Imsumeren	1,788	88.08%	
Independent	Kariba Ao	242	11.92%	
Margin of victory		1,546	76.16%	
Turnout		2,030	78.71%	
Registered electors		2,583		
Independent win (new seat)				

== See also ==
- List of constituencies of the Nagaland Legislative Assembly
- Nagaland Lok Sabha constituency
- Mokokchung district
