= Z. Nyusietho Nyuthe =

Indian politician (born 1966)

Z. Nyusietho Nyuthe (born 1966) is an Indian politician from Nagaland. He is an MLA from Meluri Assembly constituency, which is reserved for Scheduled Tribe community, in Meluri district. He won the 2023 Nagaland Legislative Assembly election, representing the Nationalist Democratic Progressive Party, which is now merged with the Naga People's Front.

== Early life and education ==
Nyuthe is from Meluri, Phek District, Nagaland. He is the son of the late Zhihuopa. He completed his M.A. in sociology in 1989 at North Eastern Hill University, Shillong. He is a retired government employee.

== Career ==
Nyuthe took voluntary retirement as Nagaland Civil Service Officer.

Nyuthe won the Meluri Assembly constituency representing the Nationalist Democratic Progressive Party in the 2023 Nagaland Legislative Assembly election. He polled 112,156 votes and defeated his nearest rival, Yitachu of the Lok Janshakti Party (Ram Vilas), by a margin of 3,580 votes. In the 2018 Nagaland Legislative Assembly election he lost to Yitachu who was contesting on an NPF ticket.
