= Aboi Assembly constituency =

Legislative Assembly constituency in Nagaland State, India

Coordinates: 26.59°N 94.9°E

Aboi
- Constituency No. 47 for the Nagaland Legislative Assembly

Constituency details
- Country: India
- Region: Northeast India
- State: Nagaland
- District: Mon
- Lok Sabha constituency: Nagaland
- Established: 1974
- Total electors: 13,589
- Reservation: ST

Member of Legislative Assembly
- 14th Nagaland Legislative Assembly
- Incumbent C. Manpon Konyak
- Party: independent
- Elected year: 2023

Aboi is one of the 60 Legislative Assembly constituencies of Nagaland state in India.

It is part of Mon district and is reserved for candidates belonging to the Scheduled Tribes.

== Members of the Legislative Assembly ==
Year	Member	Party
1974	Nyeiwang Konyak	United Democratic Alliance
1977	A. Longngei Konyak	United Democratic Alliance
1982	Eyong Konyak	Independent politician
1987	W. Eyung	Indian National Congress
1989	Nyeiwang Konyak	Indian National Congress
1993	W. Eyong	Naga People's Front
1998	Eyong Konyak	Indian National Congress
2003	Nyeiwang Konyak	Naga People's Front
2008	Nyeiwang Konyak	Naga People's Front
2013	E. Eshak Konyak	Indian National Congress
2018	E. Eshak Konyak	Naga People's Front
2023	C. Manpon Konyak	Independent politician

== Election results ==
=== 2023 Assembly election ===
2023 Nagaland Legislative Assembly election: Aboi
Party	Candidate	Votes	%	±%
Independent	C. Manpon Konyak	6,771	52.79%	
RPI(A)	Wangka Konyak	3,247	25.32%	
NDPP	E. Eshak Konyak	2,766	21.57%	−24.21%
NOTA	Nota	42	0.33%	
Margin of victory		3,524	27.48%	19.40%
Turnout		12,826	94.39%	0.35%
Registered electors		13,589		13.99%
Independent gain from NPF		Swing	-1.05%	

=== 2018 Assembly election ===
2018 Nagaland Legislative Assembly election: Aboi
Party	Candidate	Votes	%	±%
NPF	E. Eshak Konyak	6,036	53.84%	17.05%
NDPP	Awan Konyak	5,131	45.77%	
NOTA	None of the Above	43	0.38%	
Margin of victory		905	8.07%	1.55%
Turnout		11,210	94.04%	−0.30%
Registered electors		11,921		5.94%
NPF gain from INC		Swing	10.52%	

=== 2013 Assembly election ===
2013 Nagaland Legislative Assembly election: Aboi
Party	Candidate	Votes	%	±%
INC	E. Eshak Konyak	4,599	43.32%	41.07%
NPF	Nyeiwang Konyak	3,906	36.79%	−15.63%
BJP	C. Manpon Konyak	1,974	18.59%	
NCP	Taiwang	133	1.25%	
Margin of victory		693	6.53%	0.56%
Turnout		10,616	94.34%	−1.41%
Registered electors		11,253		4.30%
INC gain from NPF		Swing	-9.10%	

=== 2008 Assembly election ===
2008 Nagaland Legislative Assembly election: Aboi
Party	Candidate	Votes	%	±%
NPF	Nyeiwang Konyak	5,415	52.42%	8.79%
RJD	E. Eshak Konyak	4,799	46.46%	
INC	B. P. Hanghuh Konyak	233	2.26%	−19.44%
Margin of victory		616	5.96%	−3.02%
Turnout		10,330	96.83%	−1.79%
Registered electors		10,789		22.08%
NPF hold		Swing	8.79%	

=== 2003 Assembly election ===
2003 Nagaland Legislative Assembly election: Aboi
Party	Candidate	Votes	%	±%
NPF	Nyeiwang Konyak	3,721	43.63%	
BJP	E. Eshak Konyak	2,955	34.65%	
INC	Manlip	1,850	21.69%	−51.90%
Margin of victory		766	8.98%	−38.19%
Turnout		8,529	97.53%	5.04%
Registered electors		8,838		8.82%
NPF gain from INC		Swing	-15.14%	

=== 1998 Assembly election ===
1998 Nagaland Legislative Assembly election: Aboi
Party	Candidate	Votes	%	±%
INC	Eyong Konyak	5,452	73.59%	32.35%
Independent	Howing	1,957	26.41%	
Margin of victory		3,495	47.17%	29.64%
Turnout		7,409	92.49%	−4.50%
Registered electors		8,122		−0.53%
INC gain from NPF		Swing	14.82%	

=== 1993 Assembly election ===
1993 Nagaland Legislative Assembly election: Aboi
Party	Candidate	Votes	%	±%
NPF	W. Eyong	4,632	58.77%	9.29%
INC	Nyeiwang Konyak	3,250	41.23%	−9.29%
Margin of victory		1,382	17.53%	16.48%
Turnout		7,882	96.99%	3.05%
Registered electors		8,165		15.65%
NPF gain from INC		Swing	8.24%	

=== 1989 Assembly election ===
1989 Nagaland Legislative Assembly election: Aboi
Party	Candidate	Votes	%	±%
INC	Nyeiwang Konyak	3,324	50.52%	7.33%
NPF	W. Eyung	3,255	49.48%	
Margin of victory		69	1.05%	−18.73%
Turnout		6,579	93.94%	−0.81%
Registered electors		7,060		0.00%
INC hold		Swing	7.33%	

=== 1987 Assembly election ===
1987 Nagaland Legislative Assembly election: Aboi
Party	Candidate	Votes	%	±%
INC	W. Eyung	2,868	43.19%	24.04%
Independent	Khampei Konyak	1,555	23.42%	
NND	Y. Nyeiwang	1,491	22.45%	3.22%
Independent	B. P. Hanghuh Konyak	726	10.93%	
Margin of victory		1,313	19.77%	1.41%
Turnout		6,640	94.75%	−0.16%
Registered electors		7,060		21.10%
INC gain from Independent		Swing	3.20%	

=== 1982 Assembly election ===
1982 Nagaland Legislative Assembly election: Aboi
Party	Candidate	Votes	%	±%
Independent	Eyong Konyak	2,171	39.99%	
Independent	Khampei Konyak	1,174	21.62%	
NND	Nyeiwang Konyak	1,044	19.23%	
INC	A. Longngei Konyak	1,040	19.16%	
Margin of victory		997	18.36%	4.01%
Turnout		5,429	94.91%	8.24%
Registered electors		5,830		−4.52%
Independent gain from UDA		Swing	-10.25%	

=== 1977 Assembly election ===
1977 Nagaland Legislative Assembly election: Aboi
Party	Candidate	Votes	%	±%
UDA	A. Longngei Konyak	2,573	50.23%	−1.03%
NCN	Nyeiwang Konyak	1,838	35.88%	
Independent	Shahang	711	13.88%	
Margin of victory		735	14.35%	11.81%
Turnout		5,122	86.67%	0.74%
Registered electors		6,106		11.30%
UDA hold		Swing	-1.03%	

=== 1974 Assembly election ===
1974 Nagaland Legislative Assembly election: Aboi
Party	Candidate	Votes	%	±%
UDA	Nyeiwang Konyak	2,324	51.27%	
NNO	Longneim	2,209	48.73%	
Margin of victory		115	2.54%	
Turnout		4,533	85.93%	
Registered electors		5,486		
UDA win (new seat)				

== See also ==
- List of constituencies of the Nagaland Legislative Assembly
- Mon district
