= Yitachu =

Indian politician

Member of the Nagaland Legislative Assembly
- In office 2003–2023
- Preceded by: Khuasatho
- Succeeded by: Z. Nyusietho Nyuthe
- Constituency: Meluri

Personal details
- Born: 15 January 1967 (age 59) Hutsü Village, Meluri, Phek, Nagaland
- Party: Lok Janshakti Party (Ram Vilas)(2023- ) Nationalist Democratic Progressive Party (2022- 2023); Naga People's Front (2003-2022)
- Spouse: Kusa Fithu
- Children: 2
- Parent: Thungchamo (father)
- Education: LLB
- Alma mater: Campus Law Center, University of Delhi

Yitachu is a politician from Pochury tribe of Nagaland, India. He was elected to the Nagaland Legislative Assembly four times from the Meluri Assembly constituency in the 2003, 2008, 2013 and 2018 Nagaland Legislative Assembly election. He also served briefly as a state minister.
