= P. Chuba Chang =

Indian politician

Member of the Legislative Assembly of Nagaland for Tuensang Sadar I constituency
- In office 1998–2003

Minister of School Education
- In office 2003–2004

Personal details
- Born: P. Chuba Chang; 29 April 1965 Nagaland, India
- Died: 22 February 2013 (aged 47) Kohima, India
- Party: Indian National Congress
- Spouse: Achungla Chang
- Children: One son and a daughter

P. Chuba Chang (29 April 1965 – 22 February 2013) was an Indian politician from Nagaland. He was a Member of the Nagaland Legislative Assembly between 1998 and 2003, representing the Tuensang Sadar I constituency (until 2008 as an Independent, from 2008 onwards as a candidate of the Indian National Congress). He served as Minister of School Education in the Nagaland state government in 2003-2004 and as parliamentary secretary of economy and statistics. He died at Kohima in Naga Hospital on 22, February 2013, in the midst of his re-election campaign.

Chang is survived by wife Achungla Chang, a son and daughter.
