= Imtikümzük Longkümer =

Indian politician

Imtikümzük Longkümer (21 January 1967 – 22 September 2018) was an Indian politician from Nagaland. He was a deputy speaker of the Legislative Assembly of Nagaland. He was a member of the Naga People's Front.

Imtikümzük was a Nationalist Democratic Progressive Party (NDPP) legislator serving in the Nagaland Legislative Assembly from the Aonglenden constituency in Mokokchung district. He served in the Legislative Assembly from 2013 until his death in 2018.
