= Ghaspani I Assembly constituency =

Legislative Assembly constituency in Nagaland State, India

Coordinates: 25.79°N 93.78°E

Ghaspani I
- Constituency No. 4 for the Nagaland Legislative Assembly

Constituency details
- Country: India
- Region: Northeast India
- State: Nagaland
- District: Chümoukedima and Niuland
- Lok Sabha constituency: Nagaland
- Established: 1974
- Total electors: 75,372
- Reservation: ST

Member of Legislative Assembly
- 14th Nagaland Legislative Assembly
- Incumbent Jacob Zhimomi
- Party: Bharatiya Janata Party
- Elected year: 2023

Ghaspani I is one of the 60 Legislative Assembly constituencies of Nagaland state in India.

Previously part of Dimapur district, it is now part of Chümoukedima district and Niuland district. It is reserved for candidates belonging to the Scheduled Tribes.

== Members of the Legislative Assembly ==
Year	Member	Party
2003	H. Khekiho Zhimomi	Naga People's Front
2008	Y. Hewoto Awomi	Indian National Congress
2013	Jacob Zhimomi	Independent
2018	Jacob Zhimomi	Bharatiya Janata Party
2023	Jacob Zhimomi	Bharatiya Janata Party

== Election results ==
Vote share of winning candidates
2023	55.95%
2018	44.72%
2013	51.00%
2008	36.72%
2003	50.98%
1993	58.86%
1989	45.35%
1987	56.64%
1982	27.17%
1977	38.14%
1974	18.21%

=== Assembly Election 2023 ===
2023 Nagaland Legislative Assembly election: Ghaspani I
Party	Candidate	Votes	%	±%
BJP	Jacob Zhimomi	32,037	55.95	11.23
Independent	V. Phushika Awomi	11,941	20.85	
JD(U)	Imsumongba Pongen	8,228	14.37	
INC	Akavi N. Zhimomi	4,513	7.88	5.02
NPF	Vikato Aye	277	0.48	
NOTA	None of the above	264	0.46	
Margin of victory		20,096	35.10	30.13
Turnout		57,260	75.97	−2.97
Registered electors		75,372		13.75
BJP hold		Swing	11.23	

=== Assembly Election 2018 ===
2018 Nagaland Legislative Assembly election: Ghaspani I
Party	Candidate	Votes	%	±%
BJP	Jacob Zhimomi	23,391	44.72	
Independent	Z. Kasheto Yeptho	20,796	39.76	
AAP	Akavi N. Zhimomi	6,233	11.92	
INC	Nagavito Sumi	1,497	2.86	
NOTA	None of the Above	387	0.74	
Margin of victory		2,595	4.96	2.96
Turnout		52,304	78.94	−8.83
Registered electors		66,259		12.82
BJP gain from Independent		Swing	-6.28	

=== Assembly Election 2013 ===
2013 Nagaland Legislative Assembly election: Ghaspani I
Party	Candidate	Votes	%	±%
Independent	Jacob Zhimomi	26,287	51.00	
NPF	H. Khekiho Zhimomi	25,255	49.00	15.43
Margin of victory		1,032	2.00	−1.15
Turnout		51,543	87.77	6.22
Registered electors		58,728		−0.34
Independent gain from INC		Swing	14.28	

=== Assembly Election 2008 ===
2008 Nagaland Legislative Assembly election: Ghaspani I
Party	Candidate	Votes	%	±%
INC	Y. Hewoto Awomi	17,646	36.72	15.34
NPF	H. Khekiho Zhimomi	16,132	33.57	−17.41
Independent	Dr. Kakheto Zhimomi	14,456	30.08	
Margin of victory		1,514	3.15	−26.45
Turnout		48,054	81.86	−0.95
Registered electors		58,926		8.21
INC gain from NPF		Swing	-14.26	

=== Assembly Election 2003 ===
2003 Nagaland Legislative Assembly election: Ghaspani I
Party	Candidate	Votes	%	±%
NPF	H. Khekiho Zhimomi	22,888	50.98	
INC	Dr. Kanito	9,600	21.38	
JD(U)	Patrick	7,846	17.48	
BJP	Viyiezo Makritsu	4,560	10.16	
Margin of victory		13,288	29.60	
Turnout		44,894	82.50	−13.62
Registered electors		54,453		7.49
NPF gain from INC		Swing	-7.88	

=== Assembly Election 1998 ===
1998 Nagaland Legislative Assembly election: Ghaspani I
Party	Candidate	Votes	%	±%
INC	Dr. V. Kanito	Unopposed		
Margin of victory				
Registered electors		50,657		−0.17
INC hold		Swing		

=== Assembly Election 1993 ===
1993 Nagaland Legislative Assembly election: Ghaspani I
Party	Candidate	Votes	%	±%
INC	Shikiho	28,406	58.86	18.95
NPF	Razouvotuo	19,856	41.14	−4.21
Margin of victory		8,550	17.72	12.27
Turnout		48,262	96.12	28.50
Registered electors		50,744		52.52
INC gain from NPF		Swing	13.51	

=== Assembly Election 1989 ===
1989 Nagaland Legislative Assembly election: Ghaspani I
Party	Candidate	Votes	%	±%
NPF	H. Khekiho Zhimomi	10,000	45.35	
INC	Shikiho Sema	8,799	39.90	−16.73
NPP	Z. Nihoto	3,251	14.74	−21.73
Margin of victory		1,201	5.45	−14.72
Turnout		22,050	67.62	9.25
Registered electors		33,270		1.05
NPF gain from INC		Swing	-11.29	

=== Assembly Election 1987 ===
1987 Nagaland Legislative Assembly election: Ghaspani I
Party	Candidate	Votes	%	±%
INC	Shikiho Sema	10,551	56.64	29.47
NPP	H. Khekiho Zhimomi	6,795	36.48	
NND	Tokuho Suneho	1,283	6.89	−9.97
Margin of victory		3,756	20.16	12.87
Turnout		18,629	58.37	−2.79
Registered electors		32,923		44.58
INC hold		Swing	29.47	

=== Assembly Election 1982 ===
1982 Nagaland Legislative Assembly election: Ghaspani I
Party	Candidate	Votes	%	±%
INC	Shikiho Sema	3,665	27.17	17.47
Independent	L. Hekiye Yeptho	2,681	19.88	
Independent	Nihoto Sema	2,354	17.45	
NND	Niza	2,274	16.86	
Independent	T. K. Giant	1,217	9.02	
Independent	Adi Ritse	944	7.00	
Independent	P. Temjen Jamir	213	1.58	
Independent	Huchoveyi Chakhenang	140	1.04	
Margin of victory		984	7.30	4.06
Turnout		13,488	61.16	−5.08
Registered electors		22,772		86.52
INC gain from Independent		Swing	-10.97	

=== Assembly Election 1977 ===
1977 Nagaland Legislative Assembly election: Ghaspani I
Party	Candidate	Votes	%	±%
Independent	K. Shikhu	2,928	38.14	
UDA	Lhouvisier	2,680	34.91	16.83
Independent	Yehovi	1,093	14.24	
INC	Lhousao	745	9.70	
Independent	Reubenson Ao	231	3.01	
Margin of victory		248	3.23	3.10
Turnout		7,677	66.25	5.12
Registered electors		12,209		31.86
Independent hold		Swing	19.93	

=== Assembly Election 1974 ===
1974 Nagaland Legislative Assembly election: Ghaspani I
Party	Candidate	Votes	%	±%
Independent	Lhouvisier	995	18.21	
UDA	Niza Naleo	988	18.08	
Independent	Nihoto Sema	866	15.85	
Independent	Nithashe	729	13.34	
NNO	Thepo Fuwheto	711	13.01	
Independent	Vihot	527	9.64	
Independent	Aphu	447	8.18	
Independent	Vikhalie	201	3.68	
Margin of victory		7	0.13	
Turnout		5,464	61.13	
Registered electors		9,259		
Independent win (new seat)				

== See also ==
- List of constituencies of the Nagaland Legislative Assembly
- Dimapur district
