= Mokokchung Town Assembly constituency =

Legislative Assembly constituency in Nagaland State, India

Coordinates: 26.32°N 94.51°E

Mokokchung Town
- Constituency No. 27 for the Nagaland Legislative Assembly

Constituency details
- Country: India
- Region: Northeast India
- State: Nagaland
- District: Mokokchung
- Lok Sabha constituency: Nagaland
- Established: 1964
- Total electors: 8,252
- Reservation: ST

Member of Legislative Assembly
- 14th Nagaland Legislative Assembly
- Incumbent Metsubo Jamir
- Party: NPF
- Alliance: NDA
- Elected year: 2023

Mokokchung Town is one of the 60 Legislative Assembly constituencies of Nagaland state in India.

It is part of Mokokchung district and is reserved for candidates belonging to the Scheduled Tribes.

== Members of the Legislative Assembly ==
Year	Member	Party
1964	Khelhoshe Sema	Independent
1966 (Note: by-election)	A. Longkumer	Independent
1969	Assamwati	Nagaland Nationalist Organisation
1974	R. Lisen Ao	Nagaland Nationalist Organisation
1977	Takuyaba	United Democratic Front
1982	Takuyaba	Naga National Democratic Party
1987	Imtimeren	Indian National Congress
1989	S. C. Jamir	Indian National Congress
1993	S. C. Jamir	Indian National Congress
1998	Nungshizenba	Indian National Congress
2003	Nungshizenba	Indian National Congress
2008	C. Apok Jamir	Indian National Congress
2013	C. Apok Jamir	Indian National Congress
2018	Metsubo Jamir	Nationalist Democratic Progressive Party
2023	Metsubo Jamir	Nationalist Democratic Progressive Party

== Election results ==
=== 2023 Assembly election ===
2023 Nagaland Legislative Assembly election: Mokokchung Town
Party	Candidate	Votes	%	±%
NDPP	Metsübo Jamir	5,318	78.66%	25.79%
INC	Alem Jongshi	1,407	20.81%	18.51%
NOTA	Nota	36	0.53%	
Margin of victory		3,911	57.85%	39.94%
Turnout		6,761	81.93%	3.84%
Registered electors		8,252		14.95%
NDPP hold		Swing	25.79%	

=== 2018 Assembly election ===
2018 Nagaland Legislative Assembly election: Mokokchung Town
Party	Candidate	Votes	%	±%
NDPP	Metsübo Jamir	2,964	52.87%	
NPF	Chubatoshi Apok Jamir	1,960	34.96%	−8.60%
Independent	Temsuwati	526	9.38%	
INC	Rongsenshilu	129	2.30%	−42.20%
NOTA	None of the Above	27	0.48%	
Margin of victory		1,004	17.91%	16.97%
Turnout		5,606	78.09%	−8.07%
Registered electors		7,179		23.48%
NDPP gain from INC		Swing	8.37%	

=== 2013 Assembly election ===
2013 Nagaland Legislative Assembly election: Mokokchung Town
Party	Candidate	Votes	%	±%
INC	Chubatoshi Apok Jamir	2,229	44.50%	−0.92%
NPF	Rosemtong	2,182	43.56%	14.98%
Independent	Dr. Yangerla	579	11.56%	
Margin of victory		47	0.94%	−12.70%
Turnout		5,009	86.15%	10.82%
Registered electors		5,814		−4.58%
INC hold		Swing	-0.92%	

=== 2008 Assembly election ===
2008 Nagaland Legislative Assembly election: Mokokchung Town
Party	Candidate	Votes	%	±%
INC	Chubatoshi Apok Jamir	2,085	45.42%	−8.20%
Independent	Aolepden	1,459	31.79%	
NPF	Nokzenketba	1,312	28.58%	−17.79%
Margin of victory		626	13.64%	6.38%
Turnout		4,590	79.70%	2.49%
Registered electors		6,093		22.57%
INC hold		Swing	-8.20%	

=== 2003 Assembly election ===
2003 Nagaland Legislative Assembly election: Mokokchung Town
Party	Candidate	Votes	%	±%
INC	Nungshizenba	1,937	53.63%	
NPF	L. Nokzenketba	1,675	46.37%	
Margin of victory		262	7.25%	
Turnout		3,612	72.84%	72.84%
Registered electors		4,971		9.11%
INC hold		Swing	-44.53%	

=== 1998 Assembly election ===
1998 Nagaland Legislative Assembly election: Mokokchung Town
Party	Candidate	Votes	%	±%
INC	Nungshizenba	Unopposed		
Registered electors		4,556		−4.96%
INC hold		Swing		

=== 1993 Assembly election ===
1993 Nagaland Legislative Assembly election: Mokokchung Town
Party	Candidate	Votes	%	±%
INC	S. C. Jamir	4,580	98.16%	15.08%
NPF	Bendangtoshi	86	1.84%	−15.08%
Margin of victory		4,494	96.31%	30.17%
Turnout		4,666	97.56%	8.41%
Registered electors		4,794		72.32%
INC hold		Swing	15.08%	

=== 1989 Assembly election ===
1989 Nagaland Legislative Assembly election: Mokokchung Town
Party	Candidate	Votes	%	±%
INC	S. C. Jamir	2,017	83.07%	45.67%
NPF	Takuyaba	411	16.93%	
Margin of victory		1,606	66.14%	62.80%
Turnout		2,428	89.14%	5.89%
Registered electors		2,782		−0.22%
INC hold		Swing	45.67%	

=== 1987 Assembly election ===
1987 Nagaland Legislative Assembly election: Mokokchung Town
Party	Candidate	Votes	%	±%
INC	Imtimeren	861	37.40%	13.57%
Independent	Imkongmar	784	34.06%	
NND	Takuyaba	628	27.28%	−6.62%
Independent	Lanutoshi	29	1.26%	
Margin of victory		77	3.34%	−1.85%
Turnout		2,302	83.25%	25.43%
Registered electors		2,788		0.43%
INC gain from NND		Swing	3.50%	

=== 1982 Assembly election ===
1982 Nagaland Legislative Assembly election: Mokokchung Town
Party	Candidate	Votes	%	±%
NND	Takuyaba	535	33.90%	
Independent	I. Chuba	453	28.71%	
INC	Limatemjen	376	23.83%	
Independent	Imtijongshi	214	13.56%	
Margin of victory		82	5.20%	−35.93%
Turnout		1,578	57.82%	−26.45%
Registered electors		2,776		97.58%
NND gain from UDA		Swing	-36.66%	

=== 1977 Assembly election ===
1977 Nagaland Legislative Assembly election: Mokokchung Town
Party	Candidate	Votes	%	±%
UDA	Takuyaba	827	70.56%	50.64%
Independent	Koramoa Jamir	345	29.44%	
Margin of victory		482	41.13%	22.91%
Turnout		1,172	84.27%	37.63%
Registered electors		1,405		−58.00%
UDA gain from NNO		Swing	27.43%	

=== 1974 Assembly election ===
1974 Nagaland Legislative Assembly election: Mokokchung Town
Party	Candidate	Votes	%	±%
NNO	R. Lisen Ao	656	43.13%	−14.06%
Independent	Limatemjen	379	24.92%	
UDA	Assamwati	303	19.92%	
Independent	Atak Aonok	156	10.26%	
Independent	K. Tiayanger	27	1.78%	
Margin of victory		277	18.21%	−10.19%
Turnout		1,521	46.64%	−8.45%
Registered electors		3,345		−31.27%
NNO hold		Swing	-14.06%	

=== 1969 Assembly election ===
1969 Nagaland Legislative Assembly election: Mokokchung Town
Party	Candidate	Votes	%	±%
NNO	Assamwati	1,492	57.19%	
Independent	Kilensuwa	751	28.78%	
UDF	Tekasosang	366	14.03%	
Margin of victory		741	28.40%	
Turnout		2,609	55.09%	
Registered electors		4,867		
NNO gain from Independent		Swing		

=== 1966 Assembly by-election ===
This by-election was needed because of the death of the sitting MLA, Khelhoshe Sema.

1966 Nagaland Legislative Assembly by-election: Mokokchung Town
Party	Candidate	Votes	%	±%
Independent	A. Longkumer	905		
Independent	Moklonsama Ao	853		
Margin of victory		52		
Independent hold		Swing		

=== 1964 Assembly election ===
1964 Nagaland Legislative Assembly election: Mokokchung Town
Party	Candidate	Votes	%	±%
Independent	Khelhoshe Sema	670	50.99%	
Independent	Tekasosang	644	49.01%	
Margin of victory		26	1.98%	
Turnout		1,314	60.74%	
Registered electors		2,165		
Independent win (new seat)				

== See also ==
- List of constituencies of the Nagaland Legislative Assembly
- Mokokchung district
