= P. Bashangmongba Chang =

Indian politician (born 1979)

P. Bashangmongba Chang (born 1979) is an Indian politician from Nagaland. He is member of current 5th Rio cabinet. He is a member of the Nagaland Legislative Assembly from Tuensang Sadar Assembly constituency, which is reserved for Scheduled Tribes, in Tuensang District. He was elected in the 2023 Nagaland Legislative Assembly election, representing the Bharatiya Janata Party.

== Early life and education ==
Chang is from Tuensang, Nagaland. He is the son of Phanglou Panglo. He completed his Class 12 in 1995 and passed the examination conducted by the Board of Higher Secondary Examination, Tamil Nadu.

== Career ==
Chang won from Tuensang Sadar Assembly constituency representing Bharatiya Janata Party in the 2023 election. He polled 12,638 votes and defeated his nearest rival and sitting MLA, Toyang Chang of the Nationalist Congress Party, by a margin of 5,644 votes. He was inducted into the Nagaland ministry as the Minister of Housing and Mechanical Engineering.

At the Hok Ah festival at Langnok village in January 2025, the housing minister urged the citizens to make sustainable and judicious use of the natural resources and advocated self-reliance through skill development. In March 2025, he inaugurated the PWD Office Complex at Tongdentsuyong ward, Mokokchung.
