= Neiba Kronu =

Indian politician

Neiba Kronu is a Naga People's Front politician from Nagaland. He was elected to the Nagaland Legislative Assembly in the 2008 and 2013 elections as a candidate of the Naga People's Front and in 2018 from Pfütsero constituency as a candidate of the Nationalist Democratic Progressive Party. He was Minister of Planning & Co-ordination and Land Revenue in the Fourth Neiphiu Rio ministry from 2018-2023.
