= United Naga Democratic Party =

Indian political party

United Naga Democratic Party (UNDP) is a regional political party in Nagaland, India.
