= Second Zeliang ministry =

Second cabinet headed by T. R. Zeliang

- 20th ministry of Nagaland
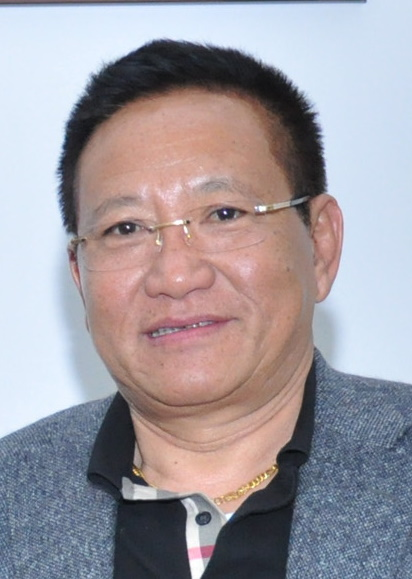
- T. R. Zeliang
- Date formed: 19 November 2017
- Date dissolved: 8 March 2018

People and organisations
- Governor: Padmanabha Balakrishna Acharya
- Chief Minister: T. R. Zeliang
- Total no. of members: 13
- Member parties: Nagaland People's Front

History
- Election: 2018
- Outgoing election: 2013
- Legislature term: 5 years
- Predecessor: Liezietsu ministry
- Successor: Fourth Rio ministry

The Second Zeliang ministry was the 20th ministry in the Indian state of Nagaland which was formed on 19 July 2017 under the leadership of chief minister T. R. Zeliang, who succeeded Shürhozelie Liezietsu. Zeliang won a vote of no-confidence on 21 July 2017 in the state legislature and expanded his council of ministers the following day.

The ministry remain in power until the chief minister's resignation on 8 March 2018 following the 2018 Legislative Assembly election.

== History ==
In February 2017, chief minister T. R. Zeliang was forced to resign from office following mass violent protests by tribal groups against his government's decision to hold urban body polls with 33 percent seats reserved for women. Following his resignation, Naga People's Front party president Shürhozelie Liezietsu was sworn in as chief minister.

On 4 July 2017, Zeliang along with 33 other MLAs held a meeting and claimed it to be the Naga People's Front legislative party meeting where Zeliang was elected as the party leader. The party MLAs authorised Zeliang to stake claim to form government before the governor heading the National Democratic Alliance government in the state along with the Bharatiya Janata Party and eight other independents. Liezietsu finally stepped down as chief minister on 19 July 2017 and Zeliang was sworn in into office by governor Padmanabha Acharya. He proved his majority in the state legislature on 21 July 2017 and formed his ministry on 22 July 2017.

== Composition ==
The ministry was formed on 22 July 2017 with the swearing-in of twelve cabinet ministers. Later on 13 December 2017, he sacked five ministers and subsequently two other ministers on 15 December 2017. He, thereupon, inducted six other cabinet ministers. Apart from the cabinet ministers, the council of ministers also composed of advisers of cabinet rank and parliamentary secretaries.

== List of members ==
=== Cabinet Ministers ===
Portfolio	Minister	Took office	Left office	Party
Chief Minister; Minister of Finance; Minister of Personnel and Administrative Reforms; All other departments not allocated to any other Minister.	T. R. Zeliang	19 July 2017	8 March 2018	NPF
Minister of Political Affairs	G. Kaito Aye	22 July 2017	8 March 2018	NPF
Minister of National Highways	G. Kaito Aye	22 July 2017	19 December 2017	NPF
Minister of National Highways	Y. Vikheho Swu	19 December 2017	22 March 2018	NPF
Minister of Health and Family Welfare; Minister of Elections	Imkong L. Imchen	22 July 2017	8 March 2018	NPF
Minister of Parliamentary Affairs	Tokheho Yepthomi	22 July 2017	13 December 2017	NPF
Minister of Parliamentary Affairs	Imkong L. Imchen	19 December 2017	8 March 2018	NPF
Minister of School Education	Tokheho Yepthomi	22 July 2017	13 December 2017	NPF
Minister of Home Affairs	Yanthungo Patton	22 July 2017	13 December 2017	NPF
Minister of Home Affairs	Küzholuzo Nienü	15 December 2017	8 March 2018	NPF
Minister of Power	C. Kipili Sangtam	22 July 2017	8 March 2018	NPF
Minister of Roads and Bridges	Neikiesalie Nicky Kire	22 July 2017	13 December 2017	NPF
Minister of Roads and Bridges	G. Kaito Aye	19 December 2017	8 March 2018	NPF
Minister of Horticulture, Do-Bhasi and Gaon Bura	Kejong Chang	22 July 2017	8 March 2018	NPF
Minister of Forest, Environment and Climate Change	Neiba Kronu	22 July 2017	13 December 2017	NPF
Minister of Cooperation; Minister of Relief and Rehabilition; Chairman, MARCOFED	Imtilemba Sangtam	22 July 2017	8 March 2018	BJP
Minister of Geology and Mining; Minister of Border Affairs	Mmhonlümo Kikon	22 July 2017	15 December 2017	BJP
Minister of Geology and Mining; Minister of Border Affairs	P. Longon	15 December 2017	8 March 2018	NPF
Minister of Rural Development	E. E. Pangteang	24 July 2017	15 December 2017	NPF
Minister of Rural Development	C. L. John	15 December 2017	8 March 2018	NPF
Minister of Urban Development and Municipal Affairs	S. I. Jamir	15 December 2017	8 March 2018	NPF
Minister of Transport and Civil Aviation	P. Paiwang Konyak	15 December 2017	8 March 2018	BJP

=== Advisors with cabinet rank ===
Portfolio	Minister	Took office	Left office	Party
Advisor for Public Health Engineering	Noke Wangnao	26 July 2017	19 December 2017	NPF
Advisor for Public Health Engineering	Jacob Zhimomi	19 December 2017	8 March 2018	NPF
Advisor for Urban Affairs and Municipal Administration	S. I. Jamir	26 July 2017	15 December 2017	NPF
Advisor for Treasuries and Accounts; Advisor for Legal Metrology and Consumer Protection	T. M. Lotha	26 July 2017	8 March 2018	NPF
Advisor for Soil and Water Conservation; Advisor for National State Disaster Management Authority	Pukhayi	26 July 2017	8 March 2018	NPF
Advisor for Under Developed Areas; Advisor for Nagaland Empowerment of People through Energy Development	S. Pangnyu Phom	26 July 2017	8 March 2018	NPF
Advisor for Planning and Coordination	C. M. Chang	26 July 2017	19 December 2017	NPF
Advisor for Planning and Coordination	E. E. Pangteang	19 December 2017	8 March 2018	NPF
Advisor for Food and Civil Supplies	Nuklutoshi	26 July 2017	8 March 2018	NPF
Advisor for Higher and Technical Education	Deo Nukhu	26 July 2017	19 December 2018	NPF
Advisor for Higher and Technical Education	N. Thomas Lotha	19 December 2018	8 March 2018	NPF
Advisor for Nagaland Beekeeping and Honey Mission	Deo Nukhu	26 July 2017	19 December 2018	NPF
Advisor for Nagaland Beekeeping and Honey Mission	Naiba Konyak	19 December 2018	8 March 2018	NPF
Advisor for State Lotteries; Advisor for Nagaland Bamboo Development Agency	Naiba Konyak	26 July 2017	8 March 2018	NPF
Advisor for Social Welfare	Chotisüh Sazo	19 December 2017	8 March 2018	NPF
Advisor for School Education	Yitachu	19 December 2017	8 March 2018	NPF
Advisor for Forest, Environment and Climate Change	N. Thongwang Konyak	19 December 2017	8 March 2018	NPF
Advisor for Jails; Advisor for Science and Technology; Advisor for Home Guards and Civil Defence; Chairman, Nagaland Khadi and Village Industries Board	Hukavi Zhimoni	19 December 2017	8 March 2018	NPF
Advisor for Mechanical Engineering; Chairman, Nagaland State Mineral Development Corporation Limited	Vikho-o Yhoshü	19 December 2017	8 March 2018	NPF
Advisor for Labour, Employment and Skill Development	R. Tohanba	19 December 2017	8 March 2018	NPF
Advisor for Evaluation; Advisor for Nagaland Rural Livelihood Mission	T. Torechu	19 December 2017	8 March 2018	NPF
Advisor for Irrigation and Flood Control; Advisor for State Institute of Rural Development	Tovihoto Ayemi	19 December 2017	8 March 2018	NPF

=== Parliamentary Secretaries ===
Portfolio	Minister	Took office	Left office	Party
Parliamentary Secretary for Tourism	Chubatoshi Apok Jamir	26 July 2017	8 March 2018	NPF
Parliamentary Secretary for Evaluation; Parliamentary Secretary for Nagaland Rural Livelihood Mission	Pohwang	26 July 2017	19 December 2017	NPF
Parliamentary Secretary for Civil Administration Works Division; Parliamentary Secretary for Taxes	Benjongliba Aier	26 July 2017	8 March 2018	NPF
Parliamentary Secretary for Transport and Civil Aviation	P. Paiwang Konyak	26 July 2017	15 December 2017	NPF
Parliamentary Secretary for Social Welfare	Merentoshi R. Jamir	26 July 2017	19 December 2017	NPF
Parliamentary Secretary for Jails; Parliamentary Secretary for Science and Technology; Chairman, Nagaland Khadi and Village Industries Board	Hukavi Zhimoni	26 July 2017	19 December 2017	NPF
Parliamentary Secretary for Fisheries; Parliamentary Secretary for Printing and Stationery	Shetoyi	26 July 2017	8 March 2018	NPF
Parliamentary Secretary for Land Resources Development; Parliamentary Secretary for Excise	B. S. Nganlang	26 July 2017	8 March 2018	NPF
Parliamentary Secretary for Technical Education	N. Thomas Lotha	26 July 2017	19 December 2017	NPF
Parliamentary Secretary for Information and Public Relations; Parliamentary Secretary for State Institute of Rural Development	Imtikümzük Longkümer	26 July 2017	8 March 2018	NPF
Parliamentary Secretary for Municipal Affairs	Zhaleo Rio	26 July 2017	19 December 2017	NPF
Parliamentary Secretary for Information Technology and Communication; Parliamentary Secretary for Development Authority of Nagaland	Longrineken	26 July 2017	8 March 2018	NPF
Parliamentary Secretary for Land Revenue; Parliamentary Secretary for Village Guards; Parliamentary Secretary for Women Resources Development	L. Khumo	26 July 2017	8 March 2018	NPF
Parliamentary Secretary for Housing	Levi Rengma	26 July 2017	8 March 2018	NPF
Parliamentary Secretary for Justice and Law	Picto Shohe	26 July 2017	8 March 2018	NPF
Parliamentary Secretary for Industries and Commerce; Parliamentary Secretary for Nagaland Industrial Development Corporation Limited	Amenba Yaden	26 July 2017	8 March 2018	NPF
Parliamentary Secretary for Agriculture	Y. M. Yolow	26 July 2017	8 March 2018	NPF
Parliamentary Secretary for New and Renewable Energy; Parliamentary Secretary for Fire and Emergency Services	Toyang Changkong Chang	26 July 2017	8 March 2018	NPF
Parliamentary Secretary for Veterinary and Animal Husbandry	S. Chuba Longkumer	26 July 2017	8 March 2018	NPF
Parliamentary Secretary for Art and Culture; Chairman, Nagaland Handloom and Handicrafts Development Corporation	E. Eshak Konyak	26 July 2017	8 March 2018	NPF
Parliamentary Secretary for Mechnical Engineering; Chairman, Nagaland State Mineral Development Corporation Limited	Vikho-o Yhoshü	26 July 2017	19 December 2017	NPF
Parliamentary Secretary for Youth Resources and Sports; Parliamentary Secretary for Music Task Force	Khekaho Assumi	26 July 2017	8 March 2018	NPF
Parliamentary Secretary for Irrigation and Flood Control	Tovihoto Ayemi	26 July 2017	19 December 2017	NPF
Parliamentary Secretary for Sericulture	Namri Nchang	26 July 2017	19 December 2017	NPF
Parliamentary Secretary for Sericulture	Imtikümzük Longkümer	19 December 2017	8 March 2018	NPF
Parliamentary Secretary for Home Guards and Civil Defence	Namri Nchang	26 July 2017	19 December 2017	NPF
Parliamentary Secretary for Economics and Statistics; Parliamentary Secretary for State Council of Educational Research and Training	Kropol Vitsu	26 July 2017	8 March 2018	NPF
Parliamentary Secretary for Labour and Employment (including Skill Development)	Neiphrezo Keditsu	26 July 2017	19 December 2017	NPF
