= Fourth Rio ministry =

Cabinet of Nagaland, India since 2018 until 2023

- Ministry of Nagaland
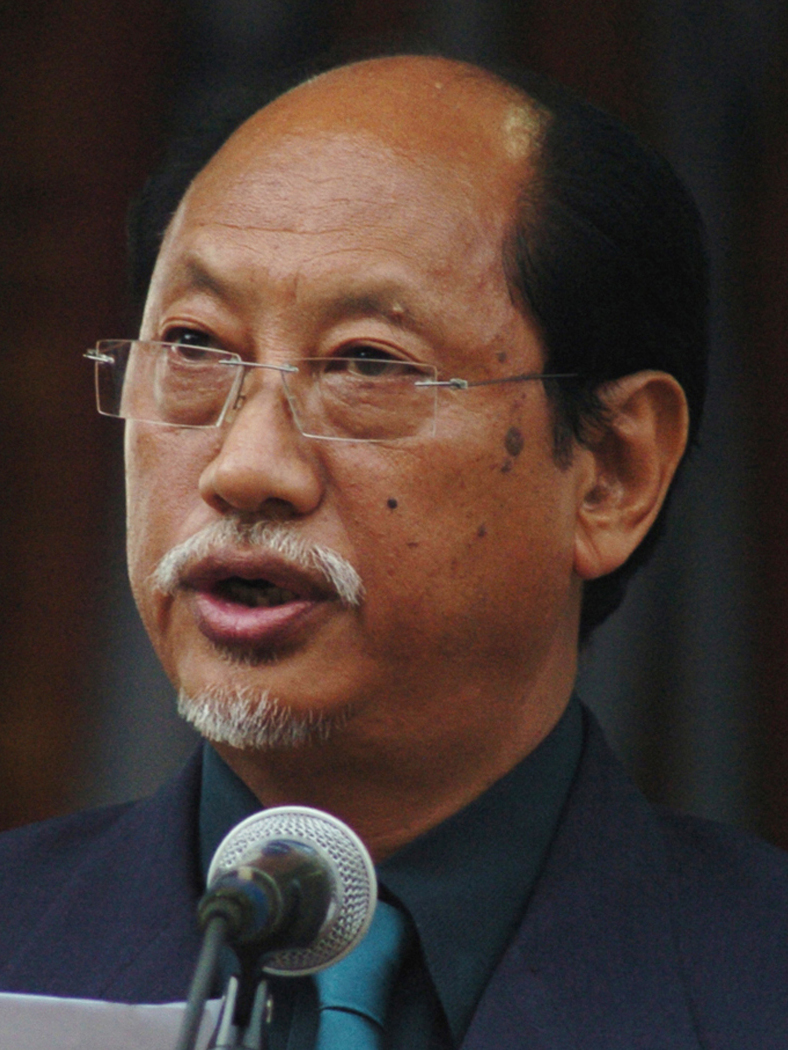
- Neiphiu Rio, the Hon'ble Chief Minister of Nagaland
- Date formed: March 2018
- Date dissolved: March 2023

People and organisations
- Head of state: Governor: Padmanabha Acharya (till 31 July 2019); R. N. Ravi (1 August 2019 – 9 September 2021); Prof Jagdish Mukhi (Governor of Assam) ( Additional Charge of Nagaland 17 September 2021 – 13 February 2023)
- Head of government: Neiphiu Rio
- No. of ministers: 12
- Member parties: NDPP; BJP
- Status in legislature: Coalition

History
- Election: 2018
- Legislature term: 5 years
- Predecessor: Zeliang II
- Successor: Rio V

This is a list of minister from the Neiphiu Rio fourth cabinet starting from December 2013. Rio is the leader of the Nationalist Democratic Progressive Party and was sworn in to the Chief Ministers of Nagaland on 8 March 2018. The ministry had 12 Cabinet ministers including the Chief Minister. The following is the list of ministers of his ministry.

In the current government, five incumbents including the Chief Minister belong to the NDPP, while six including the Deputy Chief Minister belong to the BJP. One Minister is an Independent MLA.

== Council of Ministers ==
SI No.	Cabinet Ministers	Constituency	Department	Party
1.	Neiphiu Rio; Chief Minister	Northern Angami-I	Finance.; Administrative and Personnel Reforms.; Policy issues.; Other departments not allocated to a Minister.	NDPP
2.	Yanthungo Patton; Deputy Chief Minister	Tyüi	Home.; Road and Bridges (July 2019- April 2022)	BJP
3.	Pangyu Phom	Longleng	Health and Family welfare.	BJP
4.	P. Paiwang Konyak	Tizit	Transport.; Civil Aviation & Railways.; Land resources.	BJP
5.	Jacob Zhimomi	Ghaspani-1	Public health engineering.	BJP
6.	Kashiho Sangtham	Seyochung Sitimi	Soil & Water conservation.; Geology & Mining; Chairman NSMDC	BJP
7.	Temjen Imma Along	Alongtaki	Higher Education.; Technical Education; Tribal Affairs	BJP
8.	Neiba Kronu	Pfütsero	Planning & Co-ordination.; Land revenue.	NDPP
9.	Metsübo Jamir	Mokokchung Town	Rural Development	NDPP
10.	G. Kaito Aye	Satakha	Agriculture.; Cooperative.	NDPP
11.	Y. M. Yolow	Wakching	• Forest and Environment	NDPP
12.	Tongpang Ozüküm	Angetyongpang	Housing.; Mechanical; Road & Bridges (April 2018- July 2019)	Independent

== Former Ministers ==
SI No.	Cabinet Ministers	Constituency	Department	Party	Term	Reason
1.	C. M. Chang	Noksen	Parliamentary Affairs.; Forest.; Environment.; Climate change.	NDPP	March 2018 – October 2020	Death

== See also ==
- Government of Nagaland
- Nagaland Legislative Assembly
