= 2003 elections in India =

Elections in India
- 2003

== Overall result ==
| Polling Date(s) | State | Government before | Chief Minister before | Government after | Elected Chief Minister | Maps |
|---|---|---|---|---|---|---|
| 26 February 2003 | Tripura | Communist Party of India (Marxist) | Manik Sarkar | Communist Party of India (Marxist) | Manik Sarkar | |
| 26 February 2003 | Meghalaya | Independent | Flinder Anderson Khonglam | Indian National Congress | D. D. Lapang | |
| 26 February 2003 | Nagaland | Indian National Congress | S. C. Jamir | Democratic Alliance of Nagaland | Neiphiu Rio | |
| 26 February 2003 | Himachal Pradesh | Bharatiya Janata Party | Prem Kumar Dhumal | Indian National Congress | Virbhadra Singh | |
| 20 November 2003 | Mizoram | Mizo National Front | Zoramthanga | Mizo National Front | Zoramthanga | |
| 27 November 2003 | Madhya Pradesh | Indian National Congress | Digvijaya Singh | Bharatiya Janata Party | Uma Bharti | |
| 1 December 2003 | Chhattisgarh | Indian National Congress | Ajit Jogi | Bharatiya Janata Party | Raman Singh | |
| 1 December 2003 | Delhi | Indian National Congress | Sheila Dikshit | Indian National Congress | Sheila Dikshit | |
| 1 December 2003 | Rajasthan | Indian National Congress | Ashok Gehlot | Bharatiya Janata Party | Vasundhara Raje | |

Rabi Gouda

== Legislative Assembly elections ==
=== Chhattisgarh ===
Chhattisgarh

| Party | No. of candidates | No. of elected | No. of votes | % |
|---|---|---|---|---|
| Bharatiya Janata Party | 90 | 50 | 3789914 | 39,26% |
| Bahujan Samaj Party | 54 | 2 | 429334 | 4,45% |
| Communist Party of India | 18 | 0 | 103776 | 1.08% |
| Communist Party of India (Marxist) | 6 | 0 | 27521 | 0,29% |
| Indian National Congress | 90 | 30 | 3543754 | 36,71% |
| Nationalist Congress Party | 89 | 1 | 677983 | 7,02% |
| Communist Party of India (Marxist-Leninist) Liberation | 5 | 0 | 4888 | 0,05% |
| Janata Dal (United) | 18 | 0 | 16657 | 0,17% |
| Jharkhand Mukti Morcha | 8 | 0 | 10008 | 0,10% |
| Shiv Sena | 2 | 0 | 2087 | 0,02% |
| Samajwadi Party | 52 | 0 | 91905 | 0,95% |
| Akhil Bharatiya Bharat Mata – Putra Paksha | 1 | 0 | 2655 | 0,03% |
| Akhil Bharatiya Hindu Mahasabha | 3 | 0 | 1384 | 0,01% |
| Akhil Bharatiya Jan Sangh | 1 | 0 | 1462 | 0,02% |
| Akhil Bharatiya Manav Adhikar Dal | 1 | 0 | 74 | 0,00% |
| Apna Dal | 7 | 0 | 12749 | 0,13% |
| Chhattisgarh Mukti Morcha | 8 | 0 | 37335 | 0,39% |
| Chhattisgarhi Samaj Party | 20 | 0 | 18284 | 0,19% |
| Gondvana Gantantra Party | 41 | 0 | 154446 | 1,60% |
| Jai Prakash Janata Dal | 4 | 0 | 3995 | 0,04% |
| Lok Janshakti Party | 12 | 0 | 8059 | 0,08% |
| Lokpriya Samaj Party | 2 | 0 | 1115 | 0,01% |
| Loktantrik Samajwadi Party | 11 | 0 | 8365 | 0,09% |
| Republican Party of India | 5 | 0 | 5411 | 0,06% |
| Republican Party of India (Athvale) | 6 | 0 | 2540 | 0,03% |
| Shoshit Samaj Party | 1 | 0 | 406 | 0,00% |
| Samajwadi Janata Party (Rashtriya) | 3 | 0 | 679 | 0,01% |
| Yuva Gantantra Party | 7 | 0 | 9843 | 0,10% |
| Independents | 254 | 0 | 686942 | 7,12% |
| Total: | 819 | 90 | 9653571 | |

=== Delhi ===
| Party No. of candidates | No. of elected | No. of votes | % |
|---|---|---|---|
| Indian National Congress | 70 | 47 | |
| Bharatiya Janta Party | 70 | 20 | |
| Others | 70 | 1 | |

=== Himachal Pradesh ===
| Rank | Party | Seats Contested | Seats won | % votes |
|---|---|---|---|---|
| 1 | Indian National Congress | 68 | 43 | 41 |
| 2 | Bharatiya Janata Party | 68 | 16 | 35.38 |
| 3 | Independent | 68 | 6 | 12.60 |
| 4 | Himachal Vikas Congress | 49 | 1 | 5.87 |
| 5 | Lok Jan Shakti Party | 27 | 1 | 1 |
| 6 | Loktantrik Morcha Himachal Pradesh | 14 | 1 | 2.17 |
| | Total | | 68 | |

=== Madhya Pradesh ===
| SN | Party | Seats Contested | Seats won | Seats Changed | % Votes |
|---|---|---|---|---|---|
| 1 | Bharatiya Janata Party | 225 | 173 | +90 | 43.72 |
| 2 | Indian National Congress | 224 | 38 | -86 | 32.58 |
| 3 | Samajwadi Party | 158 | 7 | + 5 | 3.89 |
| 4 | Bahujan Samaj Party | 153 | 2 | +1 | 7.58 |
| 5 | Janata Dal (United) | 4 | 0 | + 1 | 1.23 |
| 6 | Independents | 215 | 0 | 6 | 4.71 |
| | Total | | 230 | | |

=== Meghalaya ===
← Summary of the 23 February 2003 Meghalaya Legislative Assembly election results →
| Parties and coalitions | Popular vote | | | Seats | |
| Parties and coalitions | Votes | % | ±pp | Won | +/− |
|---|---|---|---|---|---|
| Indian National Congress (INC) | 270,269 | 29.96 | 5.07 ▼ | 22 | 3 ▼ |
| Nationalist Congress Party (NCP) | 174,972 | 19.40 | | 14 | |
| United Democratic Party (UDP) | 144,255 | 15.99 | 11 ▼ | 9 | 11 ▼ |
| Bharatiya Janata Party (BJP) | 48,932 | 5.42 | 0.41 ▼ | 2 | 1 ▼ |
| Meghalaya Democratic Party (MDP) | 47,852 | 5.31 | | 4 | |
| Hill State People's Democratic Party (HPDP/HSPDP) | 44,520 | 4.94 | 1.83 ▼ | 2 | 1 ▼ |
| Khun Hynnieutrip National Awakaning Movement | 32,677 | 3.62 | | 2 | |
| Garo National Council (GNC) | 8,483 | 0.94 | 1.17 ▼ | 0 | 1 ▼ |
| People's Democratic Movement (PDM) | 16,245 | 1.80 | 5.15 ▼ | 0 | 3 ▼ |
| Khasi Farmers Democratic Party (KFDP) | 2,478 | 0.27 | | 0 | |
| Communist Party of India | 551 | 0.06 | 0.11 ▼ | 0 | Steady |
| Samata Party (SAP) | 811 | 0.09 | | 0 | |
| Samajwadi Party (SP) | 245 | 0.03 | 0.06 ▼ | 0 | Steady |
| Independents (IND) | 109,686 | 12.16 | 4.0 ▼ | 5 | Steady |
| Total | 901,976 | 100.00 | | 60 | ±0 |
Source: Election Commission of India

=== Mizoram ===
| Party | Votes | % | Seats | +/– |
|---|---|---|---|---|
| Mizo National Front | 132,507 | 31.69 | 21 | 0 |
| Indian National Congress | 125,690 | 30.06 | 12 | ▲6 |
| Mizoram People's Conference | 67,576 | 16.16 | 3 | ▼9 |
| Zoram Nationalist Party | 61,466 | 14.70 | 2 | New |
| Maraland Democratic Front | 8,146 | 1.95 | 1 | ▲1 |
| Hmar People's Convention | 2,195 | 0.52 | 1 | New |
| Bharatiya Janata Party | 7,823 | 1.87 | 0 | 0 |
| Janata Dal (United) | 1,864 | 0.45 | 0 | New |
| Communist Party of India | 124 | 0.03 | 0 | New |
| Ephraim Union | 123 | 0.03 | 0 | New |
| Independents | 10,599 | 2.53 | 0 | ▼1 |
| Total | 418,113 | 100.00 | 40 | 0 |
| Valid votes | 418,113 | 99.93 | | |
| Invalid/blank votes | 307 | 0.07 | | |
| Total votes | 418,420 | 100.00 | | |
| Registered voters/turnout | 532,028 | 78.65 | | |
Source: ECI

=== Nagaland ===
| Party | Votes | % | Seats | +/– |
|---|---|---|---|---|
| Indian National Congress | 318,671 | 35.86 | 21 | –32 |
| Nagaland Peoples Front | 264,534 | 29.76 | 19 | New |
| Bharatiya Janata Party | 96,658 | 10.88 | 7 | New |
| Nationalist Democratic Movement | 84,699 | 9.53 | 5 | New |
| Janata Dal (United) | 51,562 | 5.80 | 3 | New |
| Samata Party | 10,456 | 1.18 | 1 | New |
| Nationalist Congress Party | 17,726 | 1.99 | 0 | New |
| All India Trinamool Congress | 2,951 | 0.33 | 0 | New |
| Rashtriya Lok Dal | 1,796 | 0.20 | 0 | New |
| Nagaland Democratic Party | 423 | 0.05 | 0 | New |
| Independents | 39,285 | 4.42 | 4 | –3 |
| Total | 888,761 | 100.00 | 60 | 0 |
Source: ECI

=== Rajasthan ===
| Party | No. of candidates | No. of elected | No. of votes | % |
|---|---|---|---|---|
| Bharatiya Janata Party | 200 | 120 | | |
| Indian National Congress | 200 | 56 | | |
| Others | 200 | 0 | | |

=== Tripura ===
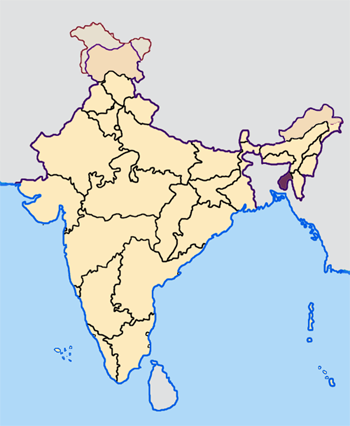
Tripura

| Party | No. of candidates | No. of elected | No. of votes | % |
|---|---|---|---|---|
| Bharatiya Janata Party | | 0 | 20032 | 1,32% |
| Communist Party of India | | | 23443 | 1,54% |
| Communist Party of India (Marxist) | | 37 | 711119 | 46,28% |
| Indian National Congress | 60 | 13 | 498749 | 32,84% |
| Nationalist Congress Party | 12 | 0 | 4553 | 0,30% |
| All India Forward Bloc | 1 | 0 | 9844 | 0,65% |
| All India Trinamool Congress | 18 | 0 | 6493 | 0,43% |
| Communist Party of India (Marxist-Leninist) Liberation | 8 | 0 | 2615 | 0,17% |
| Indigenous Nationalist Party of Twipra | 18 | 0 | 189186 | 12,46% |
| Revolutionary Socialist Party | 2 | 0 | 28688 | 1,89% |
| Janata Dal (United) | 4 | 0 | 944 | 0,06% |
| Amra Bangalee | 9 | 0 | 6791 | 0,45% |
| Lok Janshakti Party | 10 | 0 | 3544 | 0,23% |
| Independents | 52 | 0 | 12788 | 0,84% |
| Total: | 254 | 60 | 1518789 | |

== Legislative By-elections ==
=== Jammu and Kashmir ===
Winner, runner-up, voter turnout, and victory margin in every constituency
| Assembly Constituency | | Turnout | Winner | | | | Runner Up | | | | Margin |
| #k | Names | % | Candidate | Party | Votes | % | Candidate | Party | Votes | % | Margin |
|---|---|---|---|---|---|---|---|---|---|---|---|
| 1 | Pampore | 37.6% | Zahoor Ahmad Mir | JKPDP | 14,317 | 1.4% | Mushtaq Ahmad | JKNC | 1,535 | 2.45% | 12,782 |

=== Jharkhand ===
Winner, runner-up, voter turnout, and victory margin in every constituency
| Assembly Constituency | | Turnout | Winner | | | | Runner Up | | | | Margin |
| #k | Names | % | Candidate | Party | Votes | % | Candidate | Party | Votes | % | Margin |
|---|---|---|---|---|---|---|---|---|---|---|---|
| 1 | Poreyahat | 68.75% | Prashant Kumar | JMM | 58,924 | .52% | Ajit Kumar | BJP | 58,316 | .66% | 608 |
