= 2003 Nagaland Legislative Assembly election =

Legislative Assembly election in Nagaland, India

- 26 February 2003

All 60 seats in the Nagaland Legislative Assembly 31 seats needed for a majority
- Registered: 1,014,841
- Turnout: 87.85%
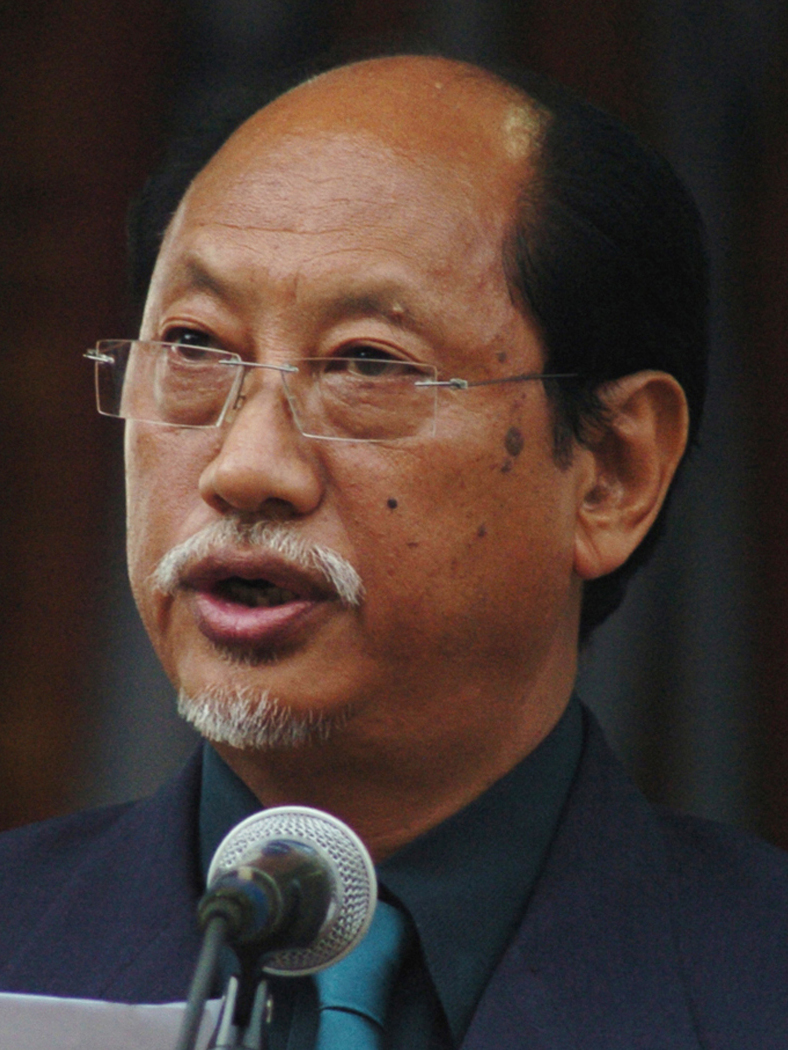

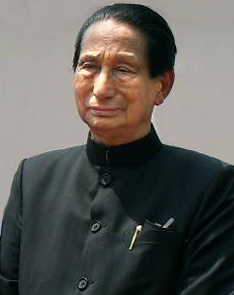

	Majority party	Minority party	Third party
Leader	Neiphiu Rio	S.C. Jamir	Hokishe Sema
Party	NPF	INC	BJP
Alliance	NDA		NDA
Leader since	2002
Leader's seat	Northern Angami-II	Aonglenden	Dimapur-I
Seats before	New	53
Seats won	19	21	7
Seat change	New	▼32	New
Popular vote	29.76%	35.86%	10.88%
CM before election
S. C. Jamir
INC
Elected CM
Neiphiu Rio
NPF

Elections to the Nagaland Legislative Assembly were held in February 2003 to elect members of the 60 constituencies in Nagaland, India. The Democratic Alliance of Nagaland, which was formed of the Naga People's Front, the Bharatiya Janata Party, Janata Dal (United) and the Samata Party, won a majority of seats and Neiphiu Rio was appointed as the Chief Minister of Nagaland. The number of constituencies was set as 60 by the recommendation of the Delimitation Commission of India.

== Background ==
After the previous elections in 1998, Neiphiu Rio, was made the Home minister in S C Jamir's cabinet, but he resigned from the Congress in September 2002, accusing the chief minister of blocking a negotiated settlement on the Naga issue. After his resignation, Rio joined the Naga People's Front which partnered with other Naga regionalist parties and the state branch of the Bharatiya Janata Party under his leadership, to form the Democratic Alliance of Nagaland.

== Parties contested ==
Party	Flag	Symbol	Leader	Seats contested
Indian National Congress			S. C. Jamir	60
Naga People's Front			Neiphiu Rio	56
Bharatiya Janata Party			L. K. Advani	38
Nationalist Democratic Movement			K. L. Chishi	25
Janata Dal (United)			Nitish Kumar	13
Nationalist Congress Party			P. A. Sangma	7
Samata Party			George Fernandes	4
Rashtriya Lok Dal			Ajit Singh	3
All India Trinamool Congress			Mamata Banerjee	2
Nagaland Democratic Party			Roland Lotha	2

== Result ==
Party	Votes	%	Seats	+/–
Indian National Congress	318,671	35.86	21	▼32
Naga People's Front	264,534	29.76	19	New
Bharatiya Janata Party	96,658	10.88	7	New
Nationalist Democratic Movement	84,699	9.53	5	New
Janata Dal (United)	51,562	5.80	3	New
Samata Party	10,456	1.18	1	New
Nationalist Congress Party	17,726	1.99	0	New
All India Trinamool Congress	2,951	0.33	0	New
Rashtriya Lok Dal	1,796	0.20	0	New
Nagaland Democratic Party	423	0.05	0	New
Independents	39,285	4.42	4	▼3
Total	888,761	100.00	60	0
Valid votes	888,761	99.69		
Invalid/blank votes	2,736	0.31		
Total votes	891,497	100.00		
Registered voters/turnout	1,014,841	87.85		
Source: ECI

=== Results by constituency ===
Winner, runner-up, voter turnout, and victory margin in every constituency
Assembly Constituency		Turnout	Winner				Runner Up				Margin
#k	Names	%	Candidate	Party	Votes	%	Candidate	Party	Votes	%	Margin
1	Dimapur I	66.11	Hokishe Sema	BJP	7,494	52.70	Kevi Zakiesatuo	INC	4,080	28.69	3,414
2	Dimapur II	63.25	Y. Hewoto Awomi	NPF	14,006	48.19	Imtisunget Jamir	INC	13,218	45.48	788
3	Dimapur III	83.73	Kihoto Hollohon	NDM	6,549	46.03	Azheto Zhimomi	NPF	6,263	44.02	286
4	Ghaspani I	82.50	H. Khekiho Zhimomi	NPF	22,888	50.95	Dr. Kanito	INC	9,600	21.37	13,288
5	Ghaspani II	88.12	Rokonicha	INC	6,337	30.21	Dr. Kakheto Zhimomi	NDM	5,970	28.46	367
6	Tening	95.36	T. R. Zeliang	INC	6,374	35.17	Namri Nchang	NPF	4,175	23.04	2,199
7	Peren	90.33	Vatsu Meru	NPF	7,869	42.10	Neiba Ndang	INC	6,658	35.63	1,211
8	Western Angami	72.87	Kiyanilie Peseyie	NPF	5,192	40.20	Asu Keyho	INC	4,226	32.72	966
9	Kohima Town	64.78	Z. Obed	NPF	8,367	44.83	T. Abao Kire	INC	7,870	42.17	497
10	Northern Angami I	61.49	Dr. Shürhozelie Liezietsu	NPF	5,502	53.91	Dr. Shürhozelie Liezietsu	INC	4,703	46.09	799
11	Northern Angami II	87.07	Neiphiu Rio	NPF	9,882	67.60	Zakio Metha	INC	3,815	26.10	6,067
12	Tseminyü	96.15	R. Khing	JD(U)	8,327	38.91	Nillo	INC	6,612	30.89	1,715
13	Pughoboto	85.45	Huska Sumi	JD(U)	5,745	49.25	Joshua Achumi	INC	4,593	39.38	1,152
14	Southern Angami I	76.63	Medokul Sophie	INC	2,845	30.23	Mavil Khieya	NPF	2,415	25.66	430
15	Southern Angami II	85.40	Viswesül Pusa	INC	5,466	56.28	Zaku Tsukru	NPF	4,247	43.72	1,219
16	Pfütsero	87.61	Kewekhape	NPF	8,268	51.04	Lhiweshelo Mero	INC	6,765	41.76	1,503
17	Chizami	94.63	Deo Nukhu	SMP	4,616	34.71	Zhovehu Lohe	INC	3,769	28.34	847
18	Chozuba	93.33	Thenucho	NPF	6,166	35.85	Nuzota Swuro	INC	4,295	24.97	1,871
19	Phek	93.87	Küzholuzo Nienü	NPF	9,084	59.09	Zachilhu Vadeo	INC	6,282	40.86	2,802
20	Meluri	97.35	Yitachu	NPF	5,557	41.37	Khuosatho	INC	4,832	35.97	725
21	Tuli	98.78	T. Tali	INC	10,131	57.71	L. Temjen Jamir	NPF	7,423	42.28	2,708
22	Arkakong	99.66	Takatiba Masa Ao	INC	7,950	51.52	Imtiyanger	NPF	7,452	48.29	498
23	Impur	97.96	Nungsangyapang	INC	7,597	58.05	T. Yubangnenba	NPF	5,488	41.93	2,109
24	Angetyongpang	87.44	Jonshilemba	IND	4,535	42.14	Tongpang Ozüküm	INC	2,094	19.46	2,441
25	Mongoya	87.05	S. Supongmeren Jamir	INC	7,081	67.43	Nungsanginba	NPF	3,145	29.95	3,936
26	Aonglenden	95.70	S. C. Jamir	INC	8,714	89.46	Chubalemla	NPF	928	9.53	7,786
27	Mokokchung Town	72.84	Nungshizenba	INC	1,937	53.49	L. Nokzenketba	NPF	1,675	46.26	262
28	Koridang	97.56	Imkong L. Imchen	IND	7,258	42.37	T. Nokyu Longchar	INC	6,894	40.24	364
29	Jangpetkong	78.86	I. Imkong	INC	6,329	74.01	Chubatemjen Ao	NPF	1,497	17.50	4,832
30	Alongtaki	85.84	Tiameren	BJP	7,423	59.81	T. Saku Aier	INC	4,988	40.19	2,435
31	Akuluto	78.91	Khetoho	NPF	3,318	54.43	Kazheto Kinimi	INC	2,778	45.57	540
32	Atoizu	87.65	Doshehe Y. Sema	INC	3,200	33.68	Kiyezhe L. Chishi	NDM	3,182	33.49	18
33	Suruhoto	90.99	Khutovi	IND	4,209	45.28	Kiyezhe Aye	INC	2,516	27.07	1,693
34	Aghunato	77.10	Tokheho Yepthomi	INC	4,363	54.56	Pukhayi	NDM	3,608	45.12	755
35	Zünheboto	72.54	S. Hukavi Zhimomi	NDM	4,700	44.86	Kakheho	INC	4,573	43.65	127
36	Satakha	79.33	Kaito	INC	3,792	40.88	Kughavi	NPF	3,048	32.86	744
37	Tyüi	90.32	Yankithung Yanthan	INC	8,108	49.45	T. A. Ngullie	BJP	5,496	33.52	2,612
38	Wokha	77.82	Dr. T. M. Lotha	BJP	8,347	35.33	A. Yentsao Odyuo	NPF	5,755	24.36	2,592
39	Sanis	94.80	Nkhao Lotha	NPF	5,168	26.74	Y. Sulanthung H. Lotha	NCP	5,131	26.55	37
40	Bhandari	84.24	E. Thungohamo Ezung	NDM	5,240	30.96	L. Yanthungo Patton	INC	4,554	26.90	686
41	Tizit	96.69	N. Yeangphong Konyak	NPF	5,387	39.21	Aloh Wangham	NDM	4,056	29.52	1,331
42	Wakching	92.16	M. C. Konyak	BJP	5,859	51.67	P. Enyei Konyak	INC	5,408	47.69	451
43	Tapi	98.43	Noke Wangnao	NPF	3,328	31.90	Lanpha Konyak	INC	3,151	30.20	177
44	Phomching	98.22	Kongam	INC	9,399	58.62	Pohwang Konyak	NPF	4,841	30.19	4,558
45	Tehok	98.16	W. Wongyuh Konyak	INC	6,748	51.22	Noklem	NPF	4,729	35.90	2,019
46	Mon Town	83.95	Chingwang	INC	5,701	43.59	S. Yokten	NPF	4,260	32.57	1,441
47	Aboi	97.53	Nyeiwang Konyak	NPF	3,721	43.17	E. Eshak Konyak	BJP	2,955	34.28	766
48	Moka	99.43	E. E. Pangteang	NPF	5,837	45.38	A. Nyamnyei Konyak	INC	4,282	33.29	1,555
49	Tamlu	99.94	Nyemli Phom	INC	9,427	31.33	B. Bangtick Phom	NDM	8,947	29.73	480
50	Longleng	99.86	Chenlom Phom	JD(U)	8,595	27.52	Pukyong Phom	NPF	7,895	25.27	700
51	Noksen	98.81	H. Chuba Chang	INC	4,478	56.12	C. M. Chang	NPF	3,495	43.80	983
52	Longkhim Chare	91.84	Imtilemba Sangtam	BJP	7,211	50.81	S. Kyukhangba Sangtam	INC	6,968	49.09	243
53	Tuensang Sadar I	94.17	P. Chuba	IND	5,595	36.95	Nungsang	INC	5,504	36.34	91
54	Tuensang Sadar II	98.79	A. Lakiumong Yimchunger	BJP	4,595	35.85	Wongto	NDM	4,104	32.01	491
55	Tobu	98.09	K. Naiba Konyak	NPF	5,792	48.05	A. Thongo Mukiano	INC	5,199	43.13	593
56	Noklak	95.39	Puthai Longon	NPF	5,736	53.26	Sedem Khaming	INC	4,793	44.51	943
57	Thonoknyu	98.24	S. Heno Khiamniungan	NDM	4,371	36.06	N. L. Aimong	INC	2,242	18.50	2,129
58	Shamator–Chessore	98.54	K. Yamakam	INC	4,602	30.15	Zungkum	NPF	4,379	28.68	223
59	Seyochung–Sitimi	99.51	C. Kipili Sangtam	NDM	10,476	64.23	S. Sethricho Sangtam	INC	4,940	30.29	5,536
60	Pungro–Kiphire	98.51	T. Torechu	BJP	10,246	46.16	Tsepikiu	NPF	9,071	40.86	1,175

== See also ==
- List of constituencies of the Nagaland Legislative Assembly
- 2003 elections in India
