= Kekhrielhoulie Yhome =

Indian politician

- 7 March 2023 – Incumbent: Advisor of School Education and SCERT

Personal details
- Party: Naga People's Front
- Other political affiliations: NDPP
- Occupation: Politician

Kekhrielhoulie Yhome is an Indian politician and a Member of the Nagaland Legislative Assembly from Northern Angami I constituency since 2023. He is the chief minister's advisor on school education and State Council of Educational Research and Training (SCERT).

== Electoral history ==
=== Assembly Election 2023 ===
2023 Nagaland Legislative Assembly election : Northern Angami I
Party	Candidate	Votes	%	±%
NDPP	Kekhrielhoulie Yhome	7,724	55.85%	15.71%
NPF	Khriehu Liezietsu	6,034	43.63%	−15.69%
NOTA	Nota	72	0.52%	
Margin of victory		1,690	12.22%	−6.96%
Turnout		13,830	77.44%	0.48%
Registered electors		17,860		4.77%
NDPP gain from NPF		Swing	-3.47%	

=== Assembly Election 2018 ===
2018 Nagaland Legislative Assembly election : Northern Angami I
Party	Candidate	Votes	%	±%
NPF	Khriehu Liezietsu	7,782	59.32%	−4.44%
NDPP	Kekhrielhoulie Yhome	5,266	40.14%	
NOTA	None of the Above	70	0.53%	
Margin of victory		2,516	19.18%	−8.35%
Turnout		13,118	76.95%	−0.56%
Registered electors		17,047		4.82%
NPF hold		Swing	-4.44%	

=== Assembly By-election 2017 ===
By-election 2017 : Northern Angami I
Party	Candidate	Votes	%	±%
NPF	Shürhozelie Liezietsu	8,038	63.76%	6.28%
Independent	Kekhrielhoulie Yhome	4,568	36.24%	
Margin of victory		3,470	27.53%	12.44%
Turnout		12,606	77.96%	−9.64%
Registered electors		16,263		−1.03%
NPF hold		Swing	6.28%	
