= A. Pongshi Phom =

Indian politician

A. Pongshi Phom (born 1969) is an Indian politician from Nagaland. He is an MLA from the Longleng Assembly constituency, which is reserved for Scheduled Tribe community, in Longleng district. He won the 2023 Nagaland Legislative Assembly election, representing the Nationalist Congress Party. He joined the NPF in 2025.

== Early life and education ==
Pongshi is from Longleng, Nagaland. He is the son of N Ayim Phom. He did his diploma in electrical engineering in 1991 at Atoizu, Nagaland.

== Career ==
Pongshi was elected from the Longleng Assembly constituency representing the Nationalist Congress Party in the 2023 Nagaland Legislative Assembly election. The debutant polled 16,908 votes and defeated his nearest rival and sitting MLA, S. Pangnyu Phom, of the Bharatiya Janata Party, who was serving as health minister, by a margin of 5,270 votes. He joined the Naga People's Front in 2025.
