= Rio ministry =

Rio ministry may refer to these cabinets headed by Indian politician Neiphiu Rio (born 1950) as chief minister of Nagaland:

- First Rio ministry (2003–2008)
- Second Rio ministry (2008–2013)
- Third Rio ministry (2013–2014)
- Fourth Rio ministry (2018–2023)
- Fifth Rio ministry (2023–present)
