= N. Bongkhao Konyak =

Indian politician

Member of Nagaland Legislative Assembly
- In office 2018–incumbent
- Preceded by: Naiba Konyak
- Constituency: Tobu Assembly constituency

Personal details
- Born: N. Bongkhao Konyak; 1977 (age 48–49) Monyakshu, Mon District, Nagaland
- Party: Nationalist Democratic Progressive Party
- Education: St. Joseph's College, Jakhama; University of Delhi

N. Bongkhao Konyak is a politician from Nagaland. He was elected to the Nagaland Legislative Assembly in 2018 from Tobu Assembly constituency as a candidate of the Naga People's Front. He was appointed Advisor for the Department of Under Developed Areas (DUDA) in the Fourth Neiphiu Rio ministry.

Bongkhao did his B.A. at St. Joseph's College, Jakhama and later completed his M.A. in Part-II Political Science from the University of Delhi in 1999.

== See also ==
- Tobu (Vidhan Sabha constituency)
