= Y. Lima Onen Chang =

Indian politician

Y. Lima Onen Chang (born 1970) is an Indian politician from Nagaland. He is an MLA from the Noksen Assembly constituency, which is reserved for Scheduled Tribe community, in Tuensang district. He won the 2023 Nagaland Legislative Assembly election, representing Republican Party of India (Athawale).

== Early life and education ==
Chang is from Noksen, Tuensang District, Nagaland. He is the son of Yemjonglepba. He completed his B.A. with honours in 1996 at Sao Chang Government College, which is affiliated with Nagaland University.

== Career ==
Chang won the Noksen Assembly constituency representing the Republican Party of India (Athawale) in the 2023 Nagaland Legislative Assembly election. He polled 5,151 votes and defeated his nearest rival and sitting MLA, H. Chuba Chang of the Nationalist Democratic Progressive Party, by a margin of 188 votes.
