= Hasnain Masoodi =

Indian politician

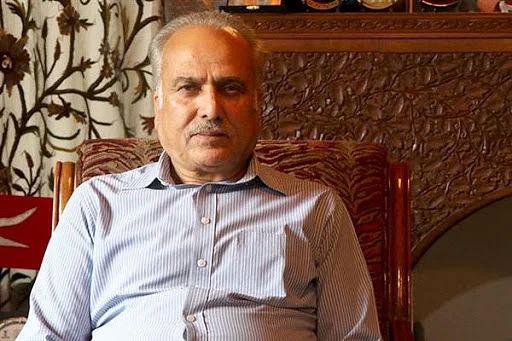

Member of Jammu and Kashmir Legislative Assembly
- Incumbent
- Assumed office 8 October 2024
- Preceded by: Zahoor Ahmad Mir
- Constituency: Pampore

Member of Parliament, Lok Sabha
- In office 23 May 2019 – 4 June 2024
- Preceded by: Mehbooba Mufti
- Succeeded by: Constituency abolished
- Constituency: Anantnag

Personal details
- Born: 2 January 1954 (age 72) Khrew, J&K, India
- Party: JKNC
- Spouse: Taseen Qadri
- Children: Dr Tamkeen Masoodi & Yawar Masoodi
- Parent(s): Ghulam Ali Masoodi & Zainab Khatoon
- Education: Harvard University (LLM)
- Profession: Senior Advocate

Hasnain Masoodi is an Indian politician from the Jammu & Kashmir National Conference Party who serves as a member of the Jammu and Kashmir Legislative Assembly.

He served as a member of the 17th Lok Sabha from Anantnag Lok Sabha constituency and was a former judge of the High Court of Jammu and Kashmir.

He was affiliated with different civil society organization's particularly the Concerned Citizens Group and Zainab Ali Khair e Aam Trust (ZAKAT).

He also used to have writeups in local dailies in the state, particularly a columnist in Greater Kashmir.

He is presently representing Pampore constituency in Jammu and Kashmir.

== Judge career ==
Masoodi went to Harvard University to pursue Master of Laws.

He was appointed as Civil Judge (Munsiff) in 1982 and later promoted as Principal District Judge in 2007. In 2009, he was elevated as Judge, Jammu & Kashmir High Court, where he served until 2016.

He was also Chairperson of the Jammu & Kashmir State Juvenile Justice Panel.

As a High Court judge, Masoodi ruled in October 2015 that the Article 370 of the Constitution of India that gives special status to the state of Jammu and Kashmir is permanent.

== Political career ==
In his maiden election in 2019, he was elected to Lok Sabha, the lower house of the Indian Parliament, from the Anantnag constituency, after defeating former Jammu and Kashmir Pradesh Congress Committee President Ghulam Ahmad Mir by nearly 8000 votes and former Chief Minister and People's Democratic Party President Mehbooba Mufti by nearly 10000 votes . He became the member of Standing committee (India) on Urban Development, Library Committee, and Consultative Committee, Ministry of Culture and Tourism.

In August 2019, as the Union government moved to revoke of the provisions of Article 370, Masoodi opposed the resolution in the Lok Sabha. After the resolutions were passed by both the Houses of Parliament, Masoodi petitioned the Supreme Court of India, along with Mohammad Akbar Lone, asking for the revocation to be declared invalid.

On 20 October 2020 he was appointed coordinator of People's Alliance for Gupkar Declaration, and played key role in Gupkar Declaration I and Gupkar Declaration II.

In the 2024 Jammu and Kashmir Legislative Assembly election Masoodi was elected as a member of the Jammu and Kashmir Legislative Assembly from Pampore.
