= Sangtam =

Sangtam may be:

- Sangtam people, a Naga people of northeastern India
- Sangtam language, their Naga (Sino-Tibetan) language
- Imtilemba Sangtam (1945–2020), Indian politician
