= Imtichoba =

Indian politician

Imtichoba Chang (born 15 June 1988) is an Indian politician from Nagaland. He is an MLA from the Tuensang Sadar II Assembly constituency, which is reserved for Scheduled Tribe community, in Tuensang district. He won the 2023 Nagaland Legislative Assembly election, representing Republican Party of India (Athawale). Chang is the youngest MLA of 14th Nagaland Legislative Assembly.

== Early life and education ==
Chang is from Tuensang Sadar, Tuensang district, Nagaland. He is the son of the late Thungpang Chollen and Sentisangla Chang (mother). He married Tangnyiu Khiamniungan. He completed his bachelor in arts in 2012 at Sao Chang Government College, Tuensang, which is affiliated with Nagaland University. He was an active student leader and worked with Chang Wetoshi Setshang from 2014 to 2017. He was also associated with the Confederation of Chang Students' Union, a former students' body and Eastern Naga Students’ Federation from 2018 to 2021. He is now serving as an advisor to the Tuensang Village Students' Union.

== Career ==
Imtichoba was elected from the Tuensang Sadar II Assembly constituency representing Republican Party of India (Athawale) in the 2023 Nagaland Legislative Assembly election. He polled 5,514 votes and defeated his nearest rival, K. Odibendang Chang of Nationalist Democratic Progressive Party, by a margin of 400 votes. The RPI (A) won its first seats outside Maharashtra and Imtichoba's victory is one of the two the party, a breakaway group of the Republican Party of India, founded by B. R. Ambedkar in 1956, won in Nagaland.
