= Tseilhoutuo Rhütso =

Naga Indian politician

Member of Nagaland Legislative Assembly
- In office 2 March 2023 – incumbent
- Preceded by: Neikiesalie Nicky Kire
- Constituency: Kohima Town

Personal details
- Born: Kohima, Nagaland, India
- Party: National People's Party

Tseilhoutuo Rhütso, popularly known as Dr. Ato, is an Indian politician from Nagaland. He was elected to the Nagaland Legislative Assembly in the 2023 elections from the Kohima Town Assembly constituency as a candidate of the National People's Party.
