= Kohima Town Assembly constituency =

Legislative Assembly constituency in Nagaland State, India

Coordinates: 25.67°N 94.11°E

Kohima Town
- Constituency No. 9 for the Nagaland Legislative Assembly

Constituency details
- Country: India
- Region: Northeast India
- State: Nagaland
- District: Kohima
- Lok Sabha constituency: Nagaland
- Established: 1964
- Total electors: 31,767
- Reservation: ST

Member of Legislative Assembly
- 14th Nagaland Legislative Assembly
- Incumbent Tseilhoutuo Rhütso
- Party: NPP
- Alliance: NDA
- Elected year: 2023

Kohima Town is one of the 60 Legislative Assembly constituencies of Nagaland state in India. It is part of Kohima district and is reserved for candidates belonging to the Scheduled Tribes. It is also part of Nagaland Lok Sabha constituency.

== Members of Legislative Assembly ==
Year	Member	Party
1964	John Bosco Jasokie	Independent politician
1969	John Bosco Jasokie	Nagaland Nationalist Organisation
1974	John Bosco Jasokie	Nagaland Nationalist Organisation
1977	John Bosco Jasokie	Indian National Congress
1982	John Bosco Jasokie	Naga National Democratic Party
1987	John Bosco Jasokie	Indian National Congress
1989	K. V. Keditsu	Naga People's Front
1993	Z. Obed	Indian National Congress
1998	T. Abao Kire	Independent politician
2003	Z. Obed	Naga People's Front
2008	Dr. Neikiesalie Nicky Kire	Naga People's Front
2013	Dr. Neikiesalie Nicky Kire	Naga People's Front
2018	Dr. Neikiesalie Nicky Kire	Nationalist Democratic Progressive Party
2023	Dr. Tseilhoutuo Rhütso	National People's Party

== Election results ==
Vote share of winning candidates
2023	49.56%
2018	54.84%
2013	63.66%
2008	59.04%
2003	44.88%
1998	51.29%
1993	51.63%
1989	51.11%
1987	53.69%
1982	56.28%
1977	54.68%
1974	65.47%
1969	65.38%
1964	81.97%

=== Assembly Election 2023 ===
2023 Nagaland Legislative Assembly election: Kohima Town
Party	Candidate	Votes	%	±%
NPP	Dr. Tseilhoutuo Rhütso	9,844	49.56%	
NDPP	Dr. Neikiesalie Nicky Kire	8,502	42.81%	−12.04%
INC	Er. Meshenlo Kath	1,413	7.11%	
NOTA	Nota	103	0.52%	
Margin of victory		1,342	6.76%	−3.56%
Turnout		19,862	62.52%	−10.12%
Registered electors		31,767		0.40%
NPP gain from NDPP		Swing	-5.28%	

=== Assembly Election 2018 ===
2018 Nagaland Legislative Assembly election: Kohima Town
Party	Candidate	Votes	%	±%
NDPP	Dr. Neikiesalie Nicky Kire	12,605	54.84%	
NPF	Dr. Tseilhoutuo Rhütso	10,233	44.52%	−19.14%
NOTA	None of the Above	146	0.64%	
Margin of victory		2,372	10.32%	−17.23%
Turnout		22,984	72.64%	−8.56%
Registered electors		31,641		5.49%
NDPP gain from NPF		Swing	-8.82%	

=== Assembly Election 2013 ===
2013 Nagaland Legislative Assembly election: Kohima Town
Party	Candidate	Votes	%	±%
NPF	Dr. Neikiesalie Nicky Kire	15,506	63.66%	4.62%
Independent	Dr. Er. Vikuotuolie Angami	8,795	36.11%	
Margin of victory		6,711	27.55%	1.66%
Turnout		24,356	81.20%	7.93%
Registered electors		29,995		−19.89%
NPF hold		Swing	4.62%	

=== Assembly Election 2008 ===
2008 Nagaland Legislative Assembly election: Kohima Town
Party	Candidate	Votes	%	±%
NPF	Dr. Neikiesalie Nicky Kire	16,197	59.04%	14.16%
INC	Z. Obed	9,094	33.15%	−9.06%
BJP	R. Sopu Angami	2,482	9.05%	
JD(U)	Sabu Sote	111	0.40%	
Margin of victory		7,103	25.89%	23.23%
Turnout		27,433	74.48%	8.49%
Registered electors		37,440		29.97%
NPF hold		Swing	14.16%	

=== Assembly Election 2003 ===
2003 Nagaland Legislative Assembly election: Kohima Town
Party	Candidate	Votes	%	±%
NPF	Z. Obed	8,367	44.88%	
INC	T. Abao Kire	7,870	42.21%	−6.50%
NDM	Tepulel Angami	2,407	12.91%	
Margin of victory		497	2.67%	0.09%
Turnout		18,644	64.78%	−10.64%
Registered electors		28,807		11.27%
NPF gain from Independent		Swing	-6.75%	

=== Assembly Election 1998 ===
1998 Nagaland Legislative Assembly election: Kohima Town
Party	Candidate	Votes	%	±%
Independent	T. Abao Kire	9,166	51.29%	
INC	Z. Obed	8,706	48.71%	−2.92%
Margin of victory		460	2.57%	−21.40%
Turnout		17,872	71.39%	−4.04%
Registered electors		25,889		28.44%
Independent gain from INC		Swing	-0.34%	

=== Assembly Election 1993 ===
1993 Nagaland Legislative Assembly election: Kohima Town
Party	Candidate	Votes	%	±%
INC	Z. Obed	7,732	51.63%	2.74%
Independent	K. V. Keditsu	4,142	27.66%	
NPF	Victor	2,880	19.23%	−31.88%
BJP	K. Ada	222	1.48%	
Margin of victory		3,590	23.97%	21.75%
Turnout		14,976	75.42%	8.55%
Registered electors		20,157		30.28%
INC gain from NPF		Swing	0.52%	

=== Assembly Election 1989 ===
1989 Nagaland Legislative Assembly election: Kohima Town
Party	Candidate	Votes	%	±%
NPF	K. V. Keditsu	5,182	51.11%	
INC	Khrieketoulie	4,957	48.89%	−4.79%
Margin of victory		225	2.22%	−5.15%
Turnout		10,139	66.87%	6.70%
Registered electors		15,472		−0.26%
NPF gain from INC		Swing	-2.58%	

=== Assembly Election 1987 ===
1987 Nagaland Legislative Assembly election: Kohima Town
Party	Candidate	Votes	%	±%
INC	John Bosco Jasokie	4,880	53.69%	9.97%
NND	Khrieketoulie	4,210	46.31%	−9.97%
Margin of victory		670	7.37%	−5.20%
Turnout		9,090	60.17%	10.39%
Registered electors		15,513		18.30%
INC gain from NND		Swing	-2.60%	

=== Assembly Election 1982 ===
1982 Nagaland Legislative Assembly election: Kohima Town
Party	Candidate	Votes	%	±%
NND	John Bosco Jasokie	3,574	56.28%	
INC	Khyomo Lotha	2,776	43.72%	−10.96%
Margin of victory		798	12.57%	3.21%
Turnout		6,350	49.78%	−13.86%
Registered electors		13,113		35.33%
NND gain from INC		Swing	1.61%	

=== Assembly Election 1977 ===
1977 Nagaland Legislative Assembly election: Kohima Town
Party	Candidate	Votes	%	±%
INC	John Bosco Jasokie	3,262	54.68%	
UDA	Peiezotuo Atuo	2,704	45.32%	30.25%
Margin of victory		558	9.35%	−36.66%
Turnout		5,966	63.63%	18.64%
Registered electors		9,690		0.44%
INC gain from NNO		Swing	-10.80%	

=== Assembly Election 1974 ===
1974 Nagaland Legislative Assembly election: Kohima Town
Party	Candidate	Votes	%	±%
NNO	John Bosco Jasokie	2,776	65.47%	0.09%
Independent	Lhoukruo	825	19.46%	
UDA	Nguro Hiezao Angami	639	15.07%	
Margin of victory		1,951	46.01%	2.95%
Turnout		4,240	44.99%	−10.55%
Registered electors		9,648		55.36%
NNO hold		Swing	0.09%	

=== Assembly Election 1969 ===
1969 Nagaland Legislative Assembly election: Kohima Town
Party	Candidate	Votes	%	±%
NNO	John Bosco Jasokie	2,253	65.38%	
Independent	Khyomo Lotha	769	22.32%	
UDF	Hariprasad Rai	424	12.30%	
Margin of victory		1,484	43.06%	
Turnout		3,446	55.54%	0.27%
Registered electors		6,210		27.73%
NNO gain from Independent		Swing	-16.59%	

=== Assembly Election 1964 ===
1964 Nagaland Legislative Assembly election: Kohima Town
Party	Candidate	Votes	%	±%
Independent	John Bosco Jasokie	2,182	81.97%	
Independent	Silie Haralu	442	16.60%	
Independent	Shyamlal Munshi	38	1.43%	
Margin of victory		1,740	65.36%	
Turnout		2,662	55.27%	
Registered electors		4,862		
Independent win (new seat)				

== See also ==
- List of constituencies of the Nagaland Legislative Assembly
- Kohima district
- Nagaland (Lok Sabha constituency)
