= Tuensang Sadar II Assembly constituency =

Legislative Assembly constituency in Nagaland State, India

Coordinates: 26.27°N 94.84°E

Tuensang Sadar II
- Constituency No. 54 for the Nagaland Legislative Assembly

Constituency details
- Country: India
- Region: Northeast India
- State: Nagaland
- District: Tuensang
- Lok Sabha constituency: Nagaland
- Established: 1974
- Total electors: 16,671
- Reservation: ST

Member of Legislative Assembly
- 14th Nagaland Legislative Assembly
- Incumbent Imtichoba
- Party: RPI(A)
- Alliance: NDA
- Elected year: 2023

Tuensang Sadar II is one of the 60 Legislative Assembly constituencies of Nagaland state in India.

It is part of Tuensang district and is reserved for candidates belonging to the Scheduled Tribes.

== Members of the Legislative Assembly ==
Year	Member	Party
1974	M. Yanchu Chang	Nagaland Nationalist Organisation
1977	Tochi Hanso	Indian National Congress
1982	A. Lakimong Yimchunger	Indian National Congress
1987	Lakiumong	Indian National Congress
1989	Lakiumong	Naga People's Front
1993	K. Imlong Chang	Naga People's Front
1998	Kejong Chang	Indian National Congress
2003	A. Lakiumong Yimchunger	Bharatiya Janata Party
2008	Kejong Chang	Indian National Congress
2013	Kejong Chang	Naga People's Front
2018	Kejong Chang	Naga People's Front
2023	Imtichoba	Republican Party of India

== Election results ==
=== 2023 Assembly election ===
2023 Nagaland Legislative Assembly election: Tuensang Sadar II
Party	Candidate	Votes	%	±%
RPI(A)	Imtichoba	5,514	36.19%	
NDPP	K. Odibendang Chang	5,114	33.56%	
NPF	H. Zungkum Chang	4,487	29.45%	−16.70%
INC	Z. Throngso	87	0.57%	
NOTA	Nota	35	0.23%	
Margin of victory		400	2.63%	−10.76%
Turnout		15,237	91.40%	2.38%
Registered electors		16,671		10.39%
RPI(A) gain from NPF		Swing	-9.96%	

=== 2018 Assembly election ===
2018 Nagaland Legislative Assembly election: Tuensang Sadar II
Party	Candidate	Votes	%	±%
NPF	Kejong Chang	6,204	46.15%	16.66%
NCP	H Zungkum Chang	4,405	32.77%	
BJP	Rhakila	2,749	20.45%	−3.02%
NPP	H. Wongto Chang	48	0.36%	
NOTA	None of the Above	38	0.28%	
Margin of victory		1,799	13.38%	10.20%
Turnout		13,444	89.02%	−2.57%
Registered electors		15,102		−22.57%
NPF hold		Swing	16.66%	

=== 2013 Assembly election ===
2013 Nagaland Legislative Assembly election: Tuensang Sadar II
Party	Candidate	Votes	%	±%
NPF	Kejong Chang	5,268	29.49%	18.86%
INC	I. N. Mongba	4,699	26.30%	−17.40%
BJP	Rhakila	4,193	23.47%	23.23%
Independent	N. Kaimang Chang	3,689	20.65%	
Margin of victory		569	3.19%	1.16%
Turnout		17,864	91.59%	−2.16%
Registered electors		19,505		4.76%
NPF gain from INC		Swing	-14.21%	

=== 2008 Assembly election ===
2008 Nagaland Legislative Assembly election: Tuensang Sadar II
Party	Candidate	Votes	%	±%
INC	Kejong Chang	7,628	43.70%	11.76%
NCP	Rhakila	7,275	41.68%	
NPF	K. Imlong Chang	1,855	10.63%	
RJD	N. Kaimang Chang	705	4.04%	
BJP	Wongto	42	0.24%	−35.71%
Margin of victory		353	2.02%	−1.82%
Turnout		17,455	94.02%	−5.04%
Registered electors		18,619		43.49%
INC gain from BJP		Swing	7.75%	

=== 2003 Assembly election ===
2003 Nagaland Legislative Assembly election: Tuensang Sadar II
Party	Candidate	Votes	%	±%
BJP	A. Lakiumong Yimchunger	4,595	35.95%	
NDM	Wongto	4,104	32.11%	
INC	Kejong Chang	4,083	31.94%	−20.24%
Margin of victory		491	3.84%	−0.53%
Turnout		12,782	98.79%	21.37%
Registered electors		12,976		16.49%
BJP gain from INC		Swing	-27.76%	

=== 1998 Assembly election ===
1998 Nagaland Legislative Assembly election: Tuensang Sadar II
Party	Candidate	Votes	%	±%
INC	Kejong Chang	4,479	52.18%	15.89%
Independent	K. Imlong Chang	4,104	47.82%	
Margin of victory		375	4.37%	−23.05%
Turnout		8,583	77.42%	−15.12%
Registered electors		11,139		2.37%
INC gain from NPF		Swing	-11.52%	

=== 1993 Assembly election ===
1993 Nagaland Legislative Assembly election: Tuensang Sadar II
Party	Candidate	Votes	%	±%
NPF	K. Imlong Chang	6,411	63.71%	7.80%
INC	A. Lakiumong Yimchunger	3,652	36.29%	−7.80%
Margin of victory		2,759	27.42%	15.59%
Turnout		10,063	92.54%	−6.35%
Registered electors		10,881		74.94%
NPF hold		Swing	7.80%	

=== 1989 Assembly election ===
1989 Nagaland Legislative Assembly election: Tuensang Sadar II
Party	Candidate	Votes	%	±%
NPF	Lakiumong	3,419	55.91%	
INC	M. B. Yimkong	2,696	44.09%	0.40%
Margin of victory		723	11.82%	−3.05%
Turnout		6,115	98.89%	0.66%
Registered electors		6,220		0.03%
NPF gain from INC		Swing	12.22%	

=== 1987 Assembly election ===
1987 Nagaland Legislative Assembly election: Tuensang Sadar II
Party	Candidate	Votes	%	±%
INC	Lakiumong	2,659	43.69%	15.76%
Independent	M. B. Yimkong	1,754	28.82%	
NND	K. Imlong Chang	1,673	27.49%	13.61%
Margin of victory		905	14.87%	9.14%
Turnout		6,086	98.23%	24.69%
Registered electors		6,218		−32.89%
INC hold		Swing	15.76%	

=== 1982 Assembly election ===
1982 Nagaland Legislative Assembly election: Tuensang Sadar II
Party	Candidate	Votes	%	±%
INC	A. Lakimong Yimchunger	1,866	27.93%	−8.03%
Independent	Yanchu Chang	1,483	22.20%	
Independent	K. Imlong Chang	1,267	18.96%	
Independent	Kechingba Yimchunger	1,138	17.03%	
NND	Tochi Hanso	927	13.88%	
Margin of victory		383	5.73%	5.12%
Turnout		6,681	73.54%	−15.52%
Registered electors		9,266		63.02%
INC hold		Swing	-8.03%	

=== 1977 Assembly election ===
1977 Nagaland Legislative Assembly election: Tuensang Sadar II
Party	Candidate	Votes	%	±%
INC	Tochi Hanso	1,773	35.96%	
Independent	M. Yanchu Chang	1,743	35.35%	
UDA	A. Lakiumong Yimchunger	1,414	28.68%	4.28%
Margin of victory		30	0.61%	−16.12%
Turnout		4,930	89.06%	8.62%
Registered electors		5,684		−7.47%
INC gain from NNO		Swing	-10.20%	

=== 1974 Assembly election ===
1974 Nagaland Legislative Assembly election: Tuensang Sadar II
Party	Candidate	Votes	%	±%
NNO	M. Yanchu Chang	2,177	46.16%	
Independent	Zutchu Loyem	1,388	29.43%	
UDA	A. Lakimong Yimchunger	1,151	24.41%	
Margin of victory		789	16.73%	
Turnout		4,716	80.43%	
Registered electors		6,143		
NNO win (new seat)				

== See also ==
- List of constituencies of the Nagaland Legislative Assembly
- Tuensang district
