= Z. Obed =

Indian politician (died 2020)

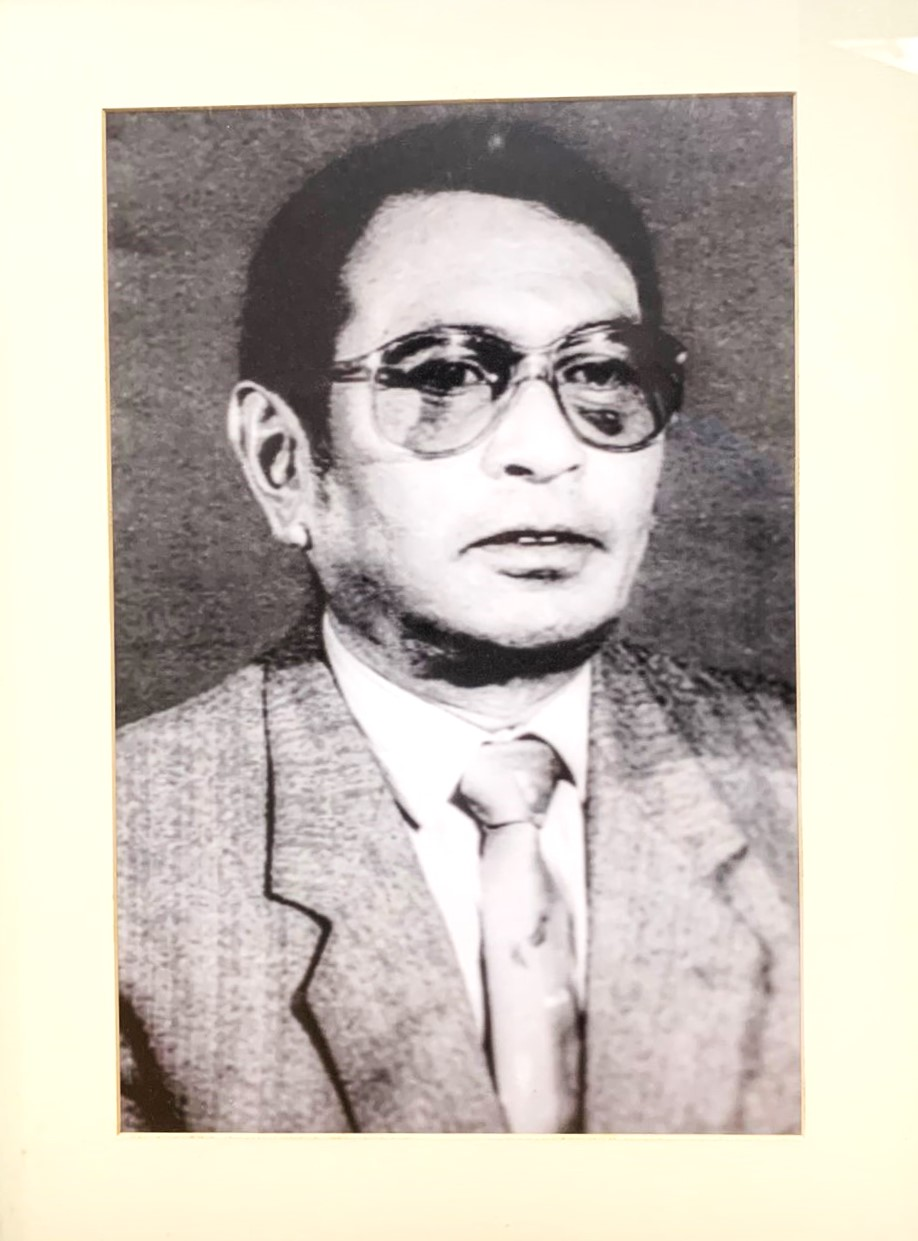

Personal details
- Born: 14 June 1931
- Died: 30 January 2020 (aged 88)

Z. Obed (died 30 January, 2020) was a Naga bureaucrat and politician from Nagaland, India.

== Early life ==
Obed was born on 14 June 1931 at Kohima village. He studied at American Baptist Middle School at Impur and later at Government High School in Kohima. In 1951, he graduated from St. Paul's College in Calcutta. He received a silver badge from Calcutta University for his sports performance.

== Career ==
He began his career as a school teacher, and became the headmaster of the Government ME School in Pughoboto in Zünheboto district of Nagaland.

=== Bureaucratic career ===
He entered the Indian Frontier Administrative Service which was formed to administer India's frontier areas, including North-East Frontier Agency. He was later inducted into the Indian Administrative Service. He served as an Extra Assistant Commissioner (EAC) in the then, Naga Hills-Tuensang Area administrative unit. He rose to this highest bureaucratic ranks in Nagaland by becoming the Chief Secretary of the state. Obed served as the state's Chief Secretary twice: first from 1980 to 1982, and then, 1987 to 1989. He retired as a government bureaucrat in 1989.

=== Politics ===
After his retirement, he successfully contested in the 1993 Nagaland state election from the Kohima Town constituency in 1993. He was appointed the state cabinet minister for planning and coordination, urban development, and economic and statistics in the S. C. Jamir government. He lost the seat in the 1998 election to T. Abao Kire, but won it back in the 2003 election. He served as the cabinet minister for public health engineering in the first Rio government.

In 2007, he led a rebellion inside the ruling coalition, seeking to remove Neiphiu Rio as Chief Minister. In September 2007, he resigned from the NPF, after having been suspended for two years from the party.

== Death ==
Obed died on 30 January 2020 following a brief illness at the age of 88. He was survived by his wife Narola, a son, and two daughters. His funeral was held at his residence at 2 1/2 mile. In his condolence message, Nagaland Chief Minister Neiphiu Rio remembered Obed as a “thorough gentleman, a learned elder and a kind soul.”
