= Pampore Assembly constituency =

Constituency of the Jammu and Kashmir Legislative Assembly

Coordinates: 34.01°N 74.92°E

Pampore
- Constituency No. 32 for the Jammu and Kashmir Legislative Assembly

Constituency details
- Country: India
- State: Jammu and Kashmir
- District: Pulwama
- Lok Sabha constituency: Srinagar
- Established: 1962

Member of Legislative Assembly
- Incumbent Hasnain Masoodi
- Party: Jammu and Kashmir National Conference
- Elected year: 2024

Pampore Assembly constituency is one of the 90 constituencies in the Jammu and Kashmir Legislative Assembly of Jammu and Kashmir a north state of India. Pampore is also part of Srinagar Lok Sabha constituency.

== Members of the Legislative Assembly ==
Election	Member	Party
1951	Peerzada Ghulam Jeelani Qadri	Jammu & Kashmir National Conference
1957	Peerzada Ghulam Jeelani Qadri	Jammu & Kashmir National Conference
1962	Peerzada Ghulam Jeelani Qadri	Jammu & Kashmir National Conference
1967	Peerzada Mubarak Shah	Indian National Congress
1972	Ghulam Hassan Masoodi	Indian National Congress
1977	Mohiuddin Malik	Jammu & Kashmir National Conference
1983	Mohammed Sultan	Jammu & Kashmir National Conference
1987	Ghulam Mohi Ud Din	Jammu & Kashmir National Conference
1996	Mushtaq Ahmad	Jammu & Kashmir National Conference
2002	Abdul Aziz Mir	Jammu and Kashmir People's Democratic Party
2003 By-election	Zahoor Ahmad Mir	Jammu and Kashmir People's Democratic Party
2008	Zahoor Ahmad Mir	Jammu and Kashmir People's Democratic Party
2014	Zahoor Ahmad Mir	Jammu and Kashmir People's Democratic Party
2024	Hasnain Masoodi	Jammu and Kashmir National Conference

== Election results ==
=== Assembly Election 2024 ===
2024 Jammu and Kashmir Legislative Assembly election : Pampore
Party	Candidate	Votes	%	±%
JKNC	Hasnain Masoodi	15,088	33.22%	New
JKPDP	Zahoor Ahmad Mir	12,325	27.14%	▼17.24
Independent	Mohammed Maqbool Shah	5,846	12.87%	New
Independent	Abdul Qayoom Mir	2,305	5.07%	New
Independent	Aadil Rashid Bhat	2,237	4.93%	New
JKAP	Mohammed Altaf Mir	1,543	3.40%	New
Independent	Mohammed Asif Ganai	1,185	2.61%	New
BJP	Syed Showakat Gayoor Andrabi	957	2.11%	▼3.41
NOTA	None of the Above	966	2.13%	▲0.42
Margin of victory		2,763	6.08%	▼3.48
Turnout		45,419	45.25%	▼1.56
Registered electors		1,00,383		▲28.41
JKNC gain from JKPDP		Swing	▼11.16	

=== Assembly Election 2014 ===
2014 Jammu and Kashmir Legislative Assembly election : Pampore
Party	Candidate	Votes	%	±%
JKPDP	Zahoor Ahmad Mir	16,239	44.38%	▲7.54
JKNC	Yawar Masoodi	12,741	34.82%	▲22.60
INC	Mohammed Anwar Bhat	4,063	11.10%	▼8.68
BJP	Ali Mohammad Wagay	2,019	5.52%	New
Independent	Ghulam Mohammed Yatoo	540	1.48%	New
Independent	Mohammed Iqbal Sofi	365	1.00%	New
NOTA	None of the Above	625	1.71%	New
Margin of victory		3,498	9.56%	▼7.50
Turnout		36,592	46.81%	▲3.38
Registered electors		78,176		▲12.50
JKPDP hold		Swing	▲7.54	

=== Assembly Election 2008 ===
2008 Jammu and Kashmir Legislative Assembly election : Pampore
Party	Candidate	Votes	%	±%
JKPDP	Zahoor Ahmad Mir	11,117	36.84%	▼36.84
INC	Mohammed Anwar Bhat	5,969	19.78%	New
JKNC	Ghulam Nabi Mir	3,686	12.21%	▲4.31
Independent	Gh Nabi Bhat	2,871	9.51%	New
Independent	Assadullah Mir	2,019	6.69%	New
Independent	Abdul Ahad Yatoo	984	3.26%	New
Independent	Mohammed Altaf Dar	674	2.23%	New
Margin of victory		5,148	17.06%	▼48.72
Turnout		30,178	43.43%	▲5.83
Registered electors		69,488		▲34.44
JKPDP hold		Swing	▼36.84	

=== Assembly By-election 2003 ===
2003 Jammu and Kashmir Legislative Assembly by-election : Pampore
Party	Candidate	Votes	%	±%
JKPDP	Zahoor Ahmad Mir	14,317	73.68%	▲35.21
JKNC	Mushtaq Ahmad	1,535	7.90%	▼12.32
Independent	Ghulam Mohammad Yatoo	983	5.06%	New
Independent	Mohammed Ramjan Dar	866	4.46%	New
Independent	Mohameed Altaf Dar	562	2.89%	New
Independent	Dr. Durakhshan	476	2.45%	New
Independent	Bashir Ahmad Mir	272	1.40%	New
Margin of victory		12,782	65.78%	▲58.66
Turnout		19,432	37.60%	▲18.43
Registered electors		51,688		▲0.00
JKPDP hold		Swing	▲35.21	

=== Assembly Election 2002 ===
2002 Jammu and Kashmir Legislative Assembly election : Pampore
Party	Candidate	Votes	%	±%
JKPDP	Abdul Aziz Mir	3,811	38.46%	New
INC	Mohammed Anwar Bhat	3,106	31.35%	▲7.59
JKNC	Ghulam Nabi Bhat	2,003	20.22%	▼49.61
Independent	Ghulam Mohammed Itoo	270	2.73%	New
JD(U)	Muzaffarullah Mir	186	1.88%	New
Independent	Hafeeza Begum	157	1.58%	New
BJP	Suhail Ahmad Mir	111	1.12%	New
Margin of victory		705	7.12%	▼38.95
Turnout		9,908	19.17%	▼38.81
Registered electors		51,688		▲15.52
JKPDP gain from JKNC		Swing	▼31.36	

=== Assembly Election 1996 ===
1996 Jammu and Kashmir Legislative Assembly election : Pampore
Party	Candidate	Votes	%	±%
JKNC	Mushtaq Ahmad	18,112	69.83%	▲12.49
INC	Mohammed Anwar	6,162	23.76%	New
JKAL	Ghulam Mohammed Lone	1,014	3.91%	New
JD	Abdul Salam	651	2.51%	New
Margin of victory		11,950	46.07%	▲28.49
Turnout		25,939	61.01%	▼22.29
Registered electors		44,742		▼7.20
JKNC hold		Swing	▲12.49	

=== Assembly Election 1987 ===
1987 Jammu and Kashmir Legislative Assembly election : Pampore
Party	Candidate	Votes	%	±%
JKNC	Ghulam Mohi Ud Din	22,186	57.33%	▼14.57
Independent	Ali Mohammed Lone	15,383	39.75%	New
JKNC	Jalal-Ud-Din	725	1.87%	▼70.03
Independent	Mohammed Akbar Lone	255	0.66%	New
Margin of victory		6,803	17.58%	▼37.29
Turnout		38,696	81.80%	▲1.03
Registered electors		48,212		▲26.74
JKNC hold		Swing	▼14.57	

=== Assembly Election 1983 ===
1983 Jammu and Kashmir Legislative Assembly election : Pampore
Party	Candidate	Votes	%	±%
JKNC	Mohammed Sultan	21,672	71.91%	▼10.20
INC	Peerzada Ghulam Jeelani Qadri	5,136	17.04%	▲14.25
JI	Pin Noor-U-Din	2,050	6.80%	New
JKNC	Abdul Salam	775	2.57%	▼79.54
Independent	Ghulam Mohammed Yatoo	506	1.68%	New
Margin of victory		16,536	54.87%	▼18.60
Turnout		30,139	83.87%	▼0.71
Registered electors		38,039		▲9.14
JKNC hold		Swing	▼10.20	

=== Assembly Election 1977 ===
1977 Jammu and Kashmir Legislative Assembly election : Pampore
Party	Candidate	Votes	%	±%
JKNC	Mohiuddin Malik	22,877	82.11%	New
JP	Ghulam Hassan Masoodi	2,409	8.65%	New
Independent	Sanaullah Dar	1,798	6.45%	New
INC	Ghulam Nabi Shada	778	2.79%	▼50.55
Margin of victory		20,468	73.46%	▲53.89
Turnout		27,862	83.36%	▲12.83
Registered electors		34,854		▲34.60
JKNC gain from INC		Swing	▲28.77	

=== Assembly Election 1972 ===
1972 Jammu and Kashmir Legislative Assembly election : Pampore
Party	Candidate	Votes	%	±%
INC	Ghulam Hassan Masoodi	9,269	53.34%	▼11.53
Independent	Peerzada Ghulam Jeelani Qadri	5,868	33.77%	New
Independent	Noor Illahi	1,736	9.99%	New
Independent	Abdul Majid Sair	504	2.90%	New
Margin of victory		3,401	19.57%	▼10.16
Turnout		17,377	71.00%	▲32.45
Registered electors		25,894		▲10.44
INC hold		Swing	▼11.53	

=== Assembly Election 1967 ===
1967 Jammu and Kashmir Legislative Assembly election : Pampore
Party	Candidate	Votes	%	±%
INC	Peerzada Mubarak Shah	5,271	64.87%	New
Independent	A. A. Dar	2,855	35.13%	New
Margin of victory		2,416	29.73%	
Turnout		8,126	37.46%	▲34.66
Registered electors		23,446		▼12.69
INC gain from JKNC		Swing		

=== Assembly Election 1962 ===
1962 Jammu and Kashmir Legislative Assembly election : Pampore
Party	Candidate	Votes	%	±%
JKNC	Peerzada Ghulam Jeelani Qadri	Unopposed		
Registered electors		26,855		
JKNC win (new seat)				

== See also ==
- Pampore
- List of constituencies of Jammu and Kashmir Legislative Assembly
