= Naiba Konyak =

Indian politician (born 1964)

14th Nagaland Assembly
- Incumbent
- Assumed office 20 February 2023

MLA from Tobu Assembly constituency

Personal details
- Born: 31 October 1964 (age 61) Tobu, Nagaland, India
- Party: Lok Janshakti Party (Ram Vilas)

K. Naiba Konyak (born 1964) is an Indian politician from Nagaland. He is a four-time MLA from the Tobu Assembly constituency, which is reserved for Scheduled Tribe community, in Mon district. He won the 2023 Nagaland Legislative Assembly election, representing the Lok Janshakti Party (Ram Vilas).

== Early life and education ==
Konyak is from Tobu, Mon district, Nagaland. He is the son of the late Keyiang. He completed his B.A. in 1991 at Kohima College, which is affiliated with North Eastern Hill University, Shillong.

== Career ==
Konyak was elected from the Tobu Assembly constituency representing Lok Janshakti Party (Ram Vilas) in the 2023 Nagaland Legislative Assembly election. He polled 10,622 votes and defeated his nearest rival and sitting MLA, N. Bongkhao Konyak of the Nationalist Democratic Progressive Party, by a margin of 506 votes. He first became an MLA winning the 2003 Nagaland Legislative Assembly election representing the Naga People's Front and defeated A. Thongo Mukiano of the Indian National Congress, by a margin of 593 votes. He retained the seat in the 2008 defeating Bongkhao of the Congress by 2,841 votes, and won for a third consecutive time in the 2013 Assembly election. However, he lost the 2018 Nagaland Legislative Assembly election to N. Bongkhao Konyak of the NDPP but regained it after shifting to the LJP.
