= Tobu Assembly constituency =

Legislative Assembly constituency in Nagaland State, India

Coordinates: 26.36°N 94.93°E

Tobu
- Constituency No. 55 for the Nagaland Legislative Assembly

Constituency details
- Country: India
- Region: Northeast India
- State: Nagaland
- District: Mon
- Lok Sabha constituency: Nagaland
- Established: 1974
- Total electors: 21,633
- Reservation: ST

Member of Legislative Assembly
- 14th Nagaland Legislative Assembly
- Incumbent Naiba Konyak
- Party: LJP(RV)
- Alliance: NDA
- Elected year: 2023

Tobu is one of the 60 Legislative Assembly constituencies of Nagaland state in India.

It is part of Mon district and is reserved for candidates belonging to the Scheduled Tribes.

== Members of the Legislative Assembly ==
Year	Member	Party
1974	Nuklo	United Democratic Alliance
1977	Nuklo	United Democratic Alliance
1982	Sheakpong Konyak	Indian National Congress
1987	A. Sopen	Naga National Democratic Party
1989	Neakba Konyak	Naga People's Front
1993	Pongchallenpa	Independent politician
1998	Sheakpong Konyak	Indian National Congress
2003	K. Naiba Konyak	Naga People's Front
2008	Naiba Konyak	Naga People's Front
2013	Naiba Konyak	Naga People's Front
2018	N. Bongkhao Konyak	Nationalist Democratic Progressive Party
2023	Naiba Konyak	Lok Janshakti Party

== Election results ==
=== 2023 Assembly election ===
2023 Nagaland Legislative Assembly election: Tobu
Party	Candidate	Votes	%	±%
LJP(RV)	Naiba Konyak	10,622	51.17	
NDPP	N. Bongkhao Konyak	10,116	48.73	−6.03
NOTA	Nota	21	0.10	
Margin of victory		506	2.44	−7.36
Turnout		20,759	95.96	0.61
Registered electors		21,633		16.08
LJP(RV) gain from NDPP		Swing	-3.60	

=== 2018 Assembly election ===
2018 Nagaland Legislative Assembly election: Tobu
Party	Candidate	Votes	%	±%
NDPP	N. Bongkhao Konyak	9,732	54.76	
NPF	Naiba Konyak	7,991	44.97	−11.25
NOTA	None of the Above	48	0.27	
Margin of victory		1,741	9.80	−2.63
Turnout		17,771	95.35	−1.87
Registered electors		18,637		0.67
NDPP gain from NPF		Swing	-1.45	

=== 2013 Assembly election ===
2013 Nagaland Legislative Assembly election: Tobu
Party	Candidate	Votes	%	±%
NPF	Naiba Konyak	10,118	56.21	−2.40
INC	Bongkhao	7,881	43.79	1.80
Margin of victory		2,237	12.43	−4.20
Turnout		17,999	97.22	2.57
Registered electors		18,513		2.53
NPF hold		Swing	-2.40	

=== 2008 Assembly election ===
2008 Nagaland Legislative Assembly election: Tobu
Party	Candidate	Votes	%	±%
NPF	Naiba Konyak	10,017	58.61	10.39
INC	Bongkhao	7,176	41.99	−1.30
Margin of victory		2,841	16.62	11.69
Turnout		17,090	95.22	−3.44
Registered electors		18,056		46.94
NPF hold		Swing	10.39	

=== 2003 Assembly election ===
2003 Nagaland Legislative Assembly election: Tobu
Party	Candidate	Votes	%	±%
NPF	Naiba Konyak	5,792	48.22	
INC	A. Thongo Mukiano	5,199	43.29	
BJP	H. Choakba	594	4.95	
Independent	Pungkhao	426	3.55	
Margin of victory		593	4.94	
Turnout		12,011	98.09	98.09
Registered electors		12,288		7.95
NPF gain from INC		Swing	5.35	

=== 1998 Assembly election ===
1998 Nagaland Legislative Assembly election: Tobu
Party	Candidate	Votes	%	±%
INC	Sheakpong Konyak	Unopposed		
Registered electors		11,383		−18.67
INC gain from Independent		Swing		

=== 1993 Assembly election ===
1993 Nagaland Legislative Assembly election: Tobu
Party	Candidate	Votes	%	±%
Independent	Pongchallenpa	5,855	42.87	
NPF	S. Hongpe Konyak	3,967	29.05	−35.86
INC	Nyakba Konyak	3,835	28.08	−7.01
Margin of victory		1,888	13.82	−15.99
Turnout		13,657	97.81	15.46
Registered electors		13,996		32.34
Independent gain from NPF		Swing	-22.04	

=== 1989 Assembly election ===
1989 Nagaland Legislative Assembly election: Tobu
Party	Candidate	Votes	%	±%
NPF	Neakba Konyak	5,636	64.91	
INC	Pongchai	3,047	35.09	−1.23
Margin of victory		2,589	29.82	26.39
Turnout		8,683	82.36	−13.80
Registered electors		10,576		0.72
NPF gain from NND		Swing	25.17	

=== 1987 Assembly election ===
1987 Nagaland Legislative Assembly election: Tobu
Party	Candidate	Votes	%	±%
NND	A. Sopen	3,991	39.74	4.16
INC	Sheakpong Konyak	3,647	36.32	−4.89
Independent	Pongchai	2,312	23.02	
NPP	B. Thongo	92	0.92	
Margin of victory		344	3.43	−2.20
Turnout		10,042	96.15	10.34
Registered electors		10,500		9.63
NND gain from INC		Swing	-1.47	

=== 1982 Assembly election ===
1982 Nagaland Legislative Assembly election: Tobu
Party	Candidate	Votes	%	±%
INC	Sheakpong Konyak	3,325	41.21	24.01
NND	Sopen Konyak	2,871	35.59	
Independent	Neakba Konyak	1,104	13.68	
Independent	Akai Konyak	605	7.50	
Independent	Henso Konyak	163	2.02	
Margin of victory		454	5.63	−8.69
Turnout		8,068	85.81	−6.30
Registered electors		9,578		42.51
INC gain from UDA		Swing	-7.35	

=== 1977 Assembly election ===
1977 Nagaland Legislative Assembly election: Tobu
Party	Candidate	Votes	%	±%
UDA	Nuklo	2,947	48.56	
NCN	Sopen Konyak	2,078	34.24	
INC	S. Yiangni	1,044	17.20	
Margin of victory		869	14.32	
Turnout		6,069	92.11	92.11
Registered electors		6,721		
UDA hold		Swing		

=== 1974 Assembly election ===
1974 Nagaland Legislative Assembly election: Tobu
Party	Candidate	Votes	%	±%
UDA	Nuklo	Unopposed		
Registered electors		1		
UDA win (new seat)				

=== 1998 ===
Candidate	Party	Votes	%
Sheakpong Konyak	Indian National Congress	Uncontested	—

- Registered electors: 11,383
- Result: Sheakpong Konyak elected unopposed.

=== 1993 ===
Candidate	Party	Votes	%
Pongchallenpa	Independent	5,855	42.87
S. Hongpe Konyak	Naga People's Front	3,967	29.05
Nyakba Konyak	Indian National Congress	3,835	28.08

- Turnout: 97.81%
- Registered electors: 13,996
- Margin of victory: 1,888 votes

=== 1989 ===
Candidate	Party	Votes	%
Neakba Konyak	Naga People's Front	5,636	64.91
Pongchai	Indian National Congress	3,047	35.09

- Turnout: 82.36%
- Registered electors: 10,576
- Margin of victory: 2,589 votes

=== 1987 ===
Candidate	Party	Votes	%
A. Sopen	Naga National Democratic Party	3,991	39.74
Sheakpong Konyak	Indian National Congress	3,647	36.32
Pongchai	Independent	2,312	23.02
B. Thongo	National People's Party	92	0.92

- Turnout: 96.15%
- Registered electors: 10,500
- Margin of victory: 344 votes

=== 1982 ===
Candidate	Party	Votes	%
Sheakpong Konyak	Indian National Congress	3,325	41.21
Sopen Konyak	Naga National Democratic Party	2,871	35.59
Neakba Konyak	Independent	1,104	13.68
Akai Konyak	Independent	605	7.50
Henso Konyak	Independent	163	2.02

- Turnout: 85.81%
- Registered electors: 9,578
- Margin of victory: 454 votes

=== 1977 ===
Candidate	Party	Votes	%
Nuklo	United Democratic Alliance (Nagaland)	2,947	48.56
Sopen Konyak	National Convention of Nagaland	2,078	34.24
S. Yiangni	Indian National Congress	1,044	17.20

- Turnout: 92.11%
- Registered electors: 6,721
- Margin of victory: 869 votes

=== 1974 ===
Candidate	Party	Votes	%
Nuklo	United Democratic Alliance (Nagaland)	Uncontested	

== See also ==
- List of constituencies of the Nagaland Legislative Assembly
- Mon district
