= Shürhozelie Liezietsu =

Indian politician

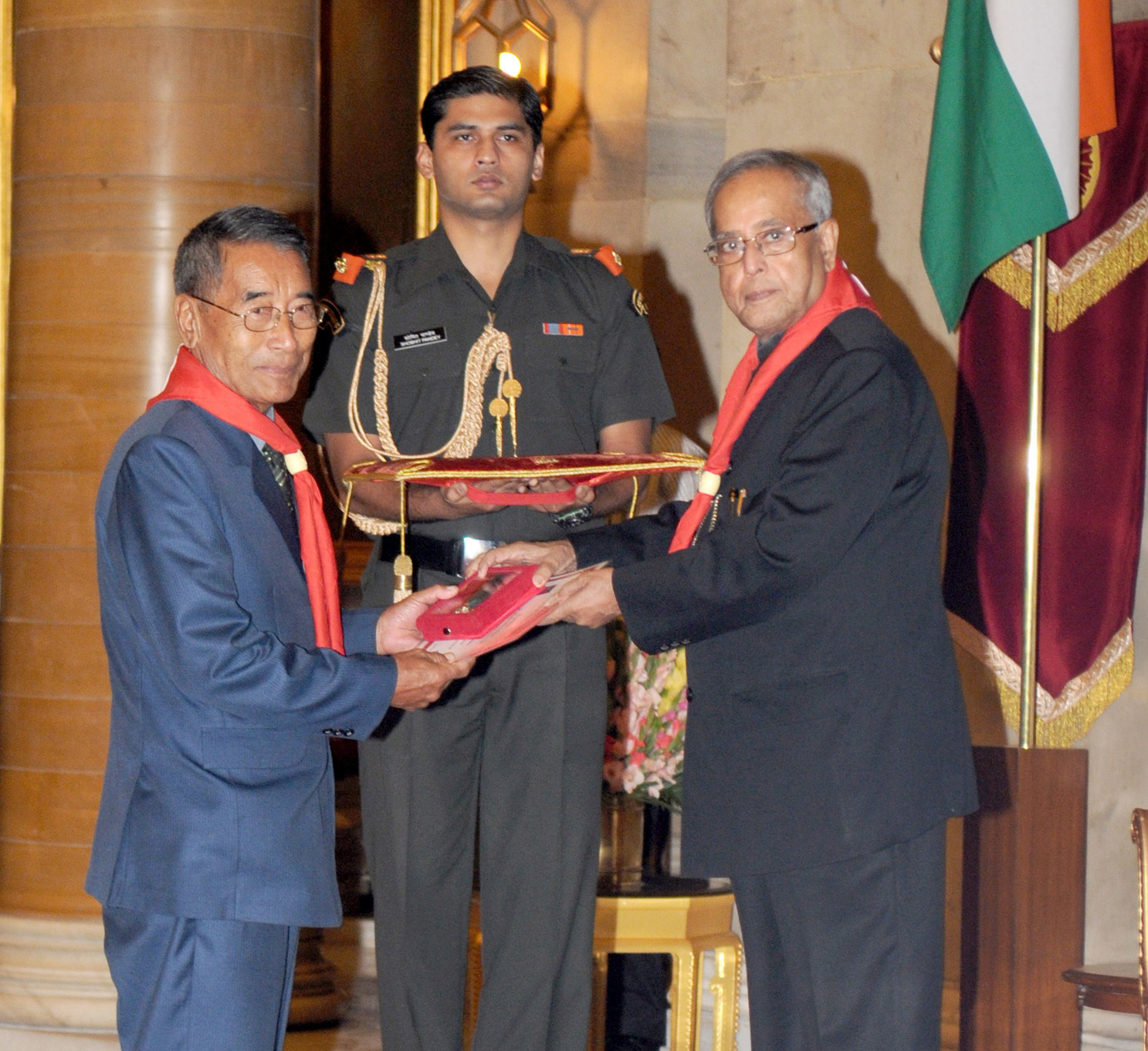

Chief Minister of Nagaland
- In office 22 February 2017 – 19 July 2017
- Preceded by: T. R. Zeliang
- Succeeded by: T. R. Zeliang

President of Nagaland People's Front
- In office 21 October 2023 – 2025
- Succeeded by: Neiphiu Rio

Personal details
- Born: 20 November 1936 (age 89) Kohima Village, Naga Hills District, Assam Province, British India (Now in Kohima District, Nagaland, India)
- Party: Nagaland People's Front

Shürhozelie Liezietsu (born 20 November 1936) is an Indian politician from Nagaland. He was the 11th Chief Minister of Nagaland. He also served as the president of Naga People's Front.

== Early life ==
Shürhozelie was born on 20 November 1936 in Kohima Village to an Angami Naga family. He did his initial schooling in Mission Public School, Kohima and completed his matriculation from Kohima Government High School in 1956. He completed his graduation from St. Edmund's College, Shillong. Shürhozelie started his career as a clerk in state secretariat before switching to teaching.

Shürhozelie also has an interest in gardening apart from writing and politics. He was the president of the Ura Academy, the Angami literary body. He was conferred an honorary D.Litt. by the Nagaland University in 2003.

== Political career ==
Liezietsu entered politics in 1969 and was one of the founding members of Nagaland's first regional party United Democratic Front (UDF), and later Naga National Democratic Party (NNDP).

In 2002 Liezietsu played a crucial role in the formation of Nagaland's People Front (NPF). In 2003 state elections he contested from the Northern Angami I seat as the Naga People's Front candidate. He won unopposed. After the election, he was appointed Minister for Urban Development. Subsequently, he retained the seat in the 2008 assembly elections and the ministry for Urban Development with the additional portfolio of Higher and Technical Education.

He did not contest the 2013 State Assembly election and remained as Chairman of the Democratic Alliance of Nagaland with cabinet status. He allowed his son Khriehu Liezietsu to contest from the same seat the election. Khriehu Liezietsu was later inducted as the chief minister's Advisor for Youth Resources and Sports and Music Task Force.

He is also one of the founding members of the first regional party in Nagaland (UDF, later NDP and presently Naga People's Front). He has been Member of Legislative Assembly (MLA) eight times and held several important portfolios in a political career spanning nearly five decades. On 22 February 2017 he was sworn in as 17th Chief Minister of Nagaland.

== Literary career ==
Liezietsu is one of the most decorated educationists in Angami language literature and has authored more than 40 books on poetry, novels, history, drama, translations and several of his books are part of the syllabus at Nagaland University.

== Personal life ==
On 25 January 1964, Liezietsu married Khotuoü, then a teacher at Baptist English School in Kohima. They had four sons together. Khotuoü died on 24 May 2026 in Guwahati.

Political offices
Preceded by T. R. Zeliang	Chief Minister of Nagaland; 22 February 2017 – 19 July 2017	Succeeded by T. R. Zeliang
