= Northern Angami I Assembly constituency =

Legislative Assembly constituency in Nagaland State, India

Coordinates: 25.7°N 94.16°E

Northern Angami I
- Constituency No. 10 for the Nagaland Legislative Assembly

Constituency details
- Country: India
- Region: Northeast India
- State: Nagaland
- District: Kohima
- Lok Sabha constituency: Nagaland
- Established: 1964
- Total electors: 31,767
- Reservation: ST

Member of Legislative Assembly
- 14th Nagaland Legislative Assembly
- Incumbent Kekhrielhoulie Yhome
- Party: NPF
- Alliance: NDA
- Elected year: 2023

Northern Angami I is one of the 60 Legislative Assembly constituencies of Nagaland state in India. It is part of Kohima district and is reserved for candidates belonging to the Scheduled Tribes. It is also part of Nagaland Lok Sabha constituency.

== Members of the Legislative Assembly ==
Year	Name	Party
1964	Neituo	Independent
1966^	K. Angami	Nagaland Nationalist Organisation
1969	Shürhozelie Liezietsu	United Democratic Alliance
1974	Shürhozelie Liezietsu	United Democratic Alliance
1977	Shürhozelie Liezietsu	United Democratic Alliance
1982	Shürhozelie Liezietsu	United Democratic Alliance
1986^	Shürhozelie Liezietsu	Naga National Democratic Party
1987	Shürhozelie Liezietsu	Naga National Democratic Party
1989	Tseivilie Miachieo	Indian National Congress
1993	Shürhozelie Liezietsu	Nagaland Peoples Council
1998	Seyiekuolie	Indian National Congress
2003	Shürhozelie Liezietsu	Naga People's Front
2008	Shürhozelie Liezietsu	Naga People's Front
2013	Khriehu Liezietsu	Naga People's Front
2017^	Shürhozelie Liezietsu	Naga People's Front
2018	Khriehu Liezietsu	Naga People's Front
2023	Kekhrielhoulie Yhome	Nationalist Democratic Progressive Party

^by-election

== Election results ==
Vote share of winning candidates
2023	55.85%
2018	59.32%
2017	63.76%
2013	57.48%
2008	37.74%
2003	53.91%
1989	56.35%
1987	36.29%
1982	32.76%
1977	63.06%
1974	56.44%
1969	56.69%
1964	81.52%

=== Assembly Election 2023 ===
2023 Nagaland Legislative Assembly election: Northern Angami I
Party	Candidate	Votes	%	±%
NDPP	Kekhrielhoulie Yhome	7,724	55.85%	15.71%
NPF	Khriehu Liezietsu	6,034	43.63%	−15.69%
NOTA	Nota	72	0.52%	
Margin of victory		1,690	12.22%	−6.96%
Turnout		13,830	77.44%	0.48%
Registered electors		17,860		4.77%
NDPP gain from NPF		Swing	-3.47%	

=== Assembly Election 2018 ===
2018 Nagaland Legislative Assembly election: Northern Angami I
Party	Candidate	Votes	%	±%
NPF	Khriehu Liezietsu	7,782	59.32%	−4.44%
NDPP	Kekhrielhoulie Yhome	5,266	40.14%	
NOTA	None of the Above	70	0.53%	
Margin of victory		2,516	19.18%	−8.35%
Turnout		13,118	76.95%	−0.56%
Registered electors		17,047		4.82%
NPF hold		Swing	-4.44%	

=== Assembly By-election 2017 ===
By-election 2017: Northern Angami I
Party	Candidate	Votes	%	±%
NPF	Shürhozelie Liezietsu	8,038	63.76%	6.28%
Independent	Kekhrielhoulie Yhome	4,568	36.24%	
Margin of victory		3,470	27.53%	12.44%
Turnout		12,606	77.96%	−9.64%
Registered electors		16,263		−1.03%
NPF hold		Swing	6.28%	

=== Assembly Election 2013 ===
2013 Nagaland Legislative Assembly election: Northern Angami I
Party	Candidate	Votes	%	±%
NPF	Khriehu Liezietsu	8,232	57.48%	19.74%
INC	Prasielie Pienyu	6,072	42.40%	11.34%
Margin of victory		2,160	15.08%	9.19%
Turnout		14,321	87.15%	11.06%
Registered electors		16,432		−24.73%
NPF hold		Swing	19.74%	

=== Assembly Election 2008 ===
2008 Nagaland Legislative Assembly election: Northern Angami I
Party	Candidate	Votes	%	±%
NPF	Dr. Shürhozelie Liezietsu	6,229	37.74%	−16.17%
Independent	Prasielie Pienyu	5,256	31.85%	
INC	Seyiekuolie	5,126	31.06%	−15.02%
Margin of victory		973	5.90%	−1.93%
Turnout		16,503	76.09%	76.09%
Registered electors		21,831		31.54%
NPF hold		Swing		

=== Assembly Election 2003 ===
2003 Nagaland Legislative Assembly election: Northern Angami I
Party	Candidate	Votes	%	±%
NPF	Dr. Shürhozelie Liezietsu	5,502	53.91%	
INC	Seyiekuolie	4,703	46.09%	
Margin of victory		799	7.83%	
Turnout		10,205	61.49%	61.49%
Registered electors		16,596		13.01%
NPF gain from INC		Swing		

=== Assembly Election 1998 ===
1998 Nagaland Legislative Assembly election: Northern Angami I
Party	Candidate	Votes	%	±%
INC	Seyiekuolie	Unopposed		
Registered electors		14,685		
INC gain from NPF		Swing		

=== Assembly Election 1993 ===
1993 Nagaland Legislative Assembly election: Northern Angami I
Party	Candidate	Votes	%	±%
NPF	Dr. Shürhozelie Liezietsu	Unopposed		
Registered electors				
NPF gain from INC		Swing		

=== Assembly Election 1989 ===
1989 Nagaland Legislative Assembly election: Northern Angami I
Party	Candidate	Votes	%	±%
INC	Tseivilie Miachieo	3,273	56.35%	28.87%
NPF	Dr. Shürhozelie Liezietsu	2,535	43.65%	
Margin of victory		738	12.71%	12.65%
Turnout		5,808	81.78%	2.32%
Registered electors		7,216		1.35%
INC gain from NND		Swing	20.07%	

=== Assembly Election 1987 ===
1987 Nagaland Legislative Assembly election: Northern Angami I
Party	Candidate	Votes	%	±%
NND	Dr. Shürhozelie Liezietsu	2,027	36.29%	3.52%
NPP	Neikhotso Linyu	2,024	36.23%	
INC	Vilhouzhalie	1,535	27.48%	25.88%
Margin of victory		3	0.05%	−11.68%
Turnout		5,586	79.45%	12.72%
Registered electors		7,120		−28.89%
NND hold		Swing	3.52%	

=== Assembly Election 1982 ===
1982 Nagaland Legislative Assembly election: Northern Angami I
Party	Candidate	Votes	%	±%
NND	Dr. Shürhozelie Liezietsu	2,189	32.76%	
Independent	P. Vikuolie	1,405	21.03%	
Independent	Neisatuo	1,364	20.42%	
Independent	Khricketoulie	1,027	15.37%	
Independent	Neikhotso Linyu	589	8.82%	
INC	Neiteo	107	1.60%	−10.77%
Margin of victory		784	11.73%	−26.75%
Turnout		6,681	66.73%	−2.30%
Registered electors		10,012		75.40%
NND gain from UDA		Swing	-30.29%	

=== Assembly Election 1977 ===
1977 Nagaland Legislative Assembly election: Northern Angami I
Party	Candidate	Votes	%	±%
UDA	Dr. Shürhozelie Liezietsu	2,446	63.06%	6.62%
Independent	Neiteo	953	24.57%	
INC	Neikhotso Linyu	480	12.37%	
Margin of victory		1,493	38.49%	12.46%
Turnout		3,879	69.03%	4.01%
Registered electors		5,708		−4.23%
UDA hold		Swing	6.62%	

=== Assembly Election 1974 ===
1974 Nagaland Legislative Assembly election: Northern Angami I
Party	Candidate	Votes	%	±%
UDA	Dr. Shürhozelie Liezietsu	2,138	56.44%	
NNO	Mezhuvilie	1,152	30.41%	6.80%
Independent	Kouhie	310	8.18%	
Independent	Kekuo	188	4.96%	
Margin of victory		986	26.03%	−7.04%
Turnout		3,788	65.02%	−7.47%
Registered electors		5,960		40.90%
UDA gain from UDF		Swing	-0.24%	

=== Assembly Election 1969 ===
1969 Nagaland Legislative Assembly election: Northern Angami I
Party	Candidate	Votes	%	±%
UDF	Dr. Shürhozelie Liezietsu	1,738	56.69%	
NNO	Mezhuvilie	724	23.61%	
Independent	Thedzukohie	604	19.70%	
Margin of victory		1,014	33.07%	
Turnout		3,066	72.48%	
Registered electors		4,230		
UDF gain from NNO		Swing		

=== Assembly By-election 1966 ===
1966 Nagaland Legislative Assembly by-election: Northern Angami I
Party	Candidate	Votes	%	±%
NNO	K.Angami	Unopposed		
NNO gain from Independent		Swing		

=== Assembly Election 1964 ===
1964 Nagaland Legislative Assembly election: Northern Angami I
Party	Candidate	Votes	%	±%
Independent	Neiteo	1,937	81.52%	
Independent	Z. Yekrulie	439	18.48%	
Margin of victory		1,498	63.05%	
Turnout		2,376	76.33%	
Registered electors		3,113		
Independent win (new seat)				

== See also ==
- List of constituencies of the Nagaland Legislative Assembly
- Kohima district
- Angami
- Nagaland (Lok Sabha constituency)
