= Deo Nukhu =

Indian politician

Member of the Nagaland Legislative Assembly
- In office 2003–2018
- Preceded by: Zhovehu Lohe
- Succeeded by: Kezhienyi Khalo
- Constituency: Chizami

Personal details
- Party: National People's Party
- Other political affiliations: Indian National Congress; Samata Party (now led by Uday Mandal its President); Naga People's Front

Deo Nukhu is an Indian politician from Nagaland. He was elected to the Nagaland Legislative Assembly from Chizami constituency in the 2013, 2008 and 2003 Nagaland Legislative Assembly election as a member of the Samata Party, Indian National Congress and Naga People's Front. He is currently a member of the National People's Party.
