= Longleng Assembly constituency =

Legislative Assembly constituency in Nagaland State, India

Coordinates: 26.49°N 94.81°E

Longleng
- Constituency No. 50 for the Nagaland Legislative Assembly

Constituency details
- Country: India
- Region: Northeast India
- State: Nagaland
- District: Longleng
- Lok Sabha constituency: Nagaland
- Established: 1974
- Total electors: 30,616
- Reservation: ST

Member of Legislative Assembly
- 14th Nagaland Legislative Assembly
- Incumbent A. Pongshi Phom
- Party: NPF
- Alliance: NDA
- Elected year: 2023

Longleng is one of the 60 Legislative Assembly constituencies of Nagaland state in India.

It is part of Longleng district and is reserved for candidates belonging to the Scheduled Tribes.

== Members of the Legislative Assembly ==
Year	Member	Party
1974	N. Metpong Phom	Independent politician
1977	Chenlom Phom	United Democratic Alliance
1982	Chenlom Phom	Naga National Democratic Party
1987	Chenlom Phom	Indian National Congress
1989	Bukchem Phom	Naga People's Front
1993	M. Chemlom Phom	Naga People's Front
1998	Shami Angh	Independent politician
2003	Chenlom Phom	Janata Dal
2008	S. Pangnyu Phom	Nationalist Congress Party
2013	S. Pangnyu Phom	Naga People's Front
2018	S. Pangnyu Phom	Bharatiya Janata Party
2023	A. Pongshi Phom	Nationalist Congress Party

== Election results ==
=== 2023 Assembly election ===
2023 Nagaland Legislative Assembly election: Longleng
Party	Candidate	Votes	%	±%
NCP	A. Pongshi Phom	16,908	57.90%	
BJP	S. Pangnyu Phom	11,638	39.85%	−2.05%
Independent	Phuyam	410	1.40%	
INC	Denngan Y Avennoho	232	0.79%	
NOTA	Nota	16	0.05%	
Margin of victory		5,270	18.05%	13.82%
Turnout		29,204	95.39%	0.85%
Registered electors		30,616		21.44%
NCP gain from BJP		Swing	15.99%	

=== 2018 Assembly election ===
2018 Nagaland Legislative Assembly election: Longleng
Party	Candidate	Votes	%	±%
BJP	S. Pangnyu Phom	9,987	41.90%	
NPP	Y. B. Angam Phom	8,981	37.68%	
NPF	Er. T. L. Semdok	4,639	19.46%	−39.84%
NOTA	None of the Above	226	0.95%	
Margin of victory		1,006	4.22%	−14.85%
Turnout		23,833	94.53%	−2.61%
Registered electors		25,211		10.28%
BJP gain from NPF		Swing	-17.40%	

=== 2013 Assembly election ===
2013 Nagaland Legislative Assembly election: Longleng
Party	Candidate	Votes	%	±%
NPF	S. Pangnyu Phom	13,171	59.30%	54.58%
NCP	T.L. Semdok	8,936	40.24%	3.30%
INC	Shami Angh	88	0.40%	−11.46%
Margin of victory		4,235	19.07%	12.99%
Turnout		22,209	97.15%	1.21%
Registered electors		22,861		−40.15%
NPF gain from NCP		Swing	22.37%	

=== 2008 Assembly election ===
2008 Nagaland Legislative Assembly election: Longleng
Party	Candidate	Votes	%	±%
NCP	S. Pangnyu Phom	13,535	36.94%	
RJD	Er. T. L. Semdok	11,309	30.86%	
INC	Shami Angh	4,346	11.86%	−11.28%
Independent	S. Bukchem	3,601	9.83%	
NPF	M. Chemlom Phom	1,732	4.73%	−20.55%
JD(S)	Pukyong	1,448	3.95%	
Margin of victory		2,226	6.07%	3.83%
Turnout		36,644	96.18%	−3.92%
Registered electors		38,196		22.11%
NCP gain from JD(U)		Swing	9.42%	

=== 2003 Assembly election ===
2003 Nagaland Legislative Assembly election: Longleng
Party	Candidate	Votes	%	±%
JD(U)	Chenlom Phom	8,595	27.52%	
NPF	Pukyong Phom	7,895	25.27%	
BJP	Y. B. Angam Phom	7,518	24.07%	
INC	Shami Angh	7,229	23.14%	−18.91%
Margin of victory		700	2.24%	0.16%
Turnout		31,237	99.86%	1.46%
Registered electors		31,281		14.48%
JD(U) gain from Independent		Swing	-24.41%	

=== 1998 Assembly election ===
1998 Nagaland Legislative Assembly election: Longleng
Party	Candidate	Votes	%	±%
Independent	Shami Angh	11,843	44.13%	
INC	M. Chemlom Phom	11,285	42.05%	−6.03%
Independent	Mangko Phom	3,710	13.82%	
Margin of victory		558	2.08%	−1.76%
Turnout		26,838	98.40%	−1.46%
Registered electors		27,325		19.47%
Independent gain from NPF		Swing	-7.79%	

=== 1993 Assembly election ===
1993 Nagaland Legislative Assembly election: Longleng
Party	Candidate	Votes	%	±%
NPF	M. Chemlom Phom	11,840	51.92%	−3.50%
INC	Bukchem Phom	10,964	48.08%	3.50%
Margin of victory		876	3.84%	−6.99%
Turnout		22,804	99.86%	0.58%
Registered electors		22,872		151.18%
NPF hold		Swing	-3.50%	

=== 1989 Assembly election ===
1989 Nagaland Legislative Assembly election: Longleng
Party	Candidate	Votes	%	±%
NPF	Bukchem Phom	5,003	55.42%	
INC	Chenlom Phom	4,025	44.58%	14.21%
Margin of victory		978	10.83%	5.42%
Turnout		9,028	99.28%	0.68%
Registered electors		9,106		−0.65%
NPF gain from INC		Swing	25.04%	

=== 1987 Assembly election ===
1987 Nagaland Legislative Assembly election: Longleng
Party	Candidate	Votes	%	±%
INC	Chenlom Phom	2,736	30.37%	13.06%
Independent	Heongphom	2,248	24.96%	
NND	Zukchem	2,069	22.97%	−14.85%
NPP	Y. B. Angam Phom	1,955	21.70%	
Margin of victory		488	5.42%	−9.76%
Turnout		9,008	98.59%	9.30%
Registered electors		9,166		−31.24%
INC gain from NND		Swing	-7.45%	

=== 1982 Assembly election ===
1982 Nagaland Legislative Assembly election: Longleng
Party	Candidate	Votes	%	±%
NND	Chenlom Phom	4,462	37.82%	
Independent	Chingko	2,672	22.65%	
Independent	N. Metpong Phom	2,621	22.22%	
INC	Y. Mangkoangba Phom	2,042	17.31%	−5.13%
Margin of victory		1,790	15.17%	12.11%
Turnout		11,797	89.29%	−3.71%
Registered electors		13,331		40.49%
NND gain from UDA		Swing	12.32%	

=== 1977 Assembly election ===
1977 Nagaland Legislative Assembly election: Longleng
Party	Candidate	Votes	%	±%
UDA	Chenlom Phom	2,213	25.50%	4.04%
INC	Chirgko	1,947	22.44%	
Independent	N. Metpong Phom	1,724	19.87%	
NCN	Y. Mangkoangba Phom	1,572	18.12%	
Independent	L. Phenglong	1,221	14.07%	
Margin of victory		266	3.07%	−0.77%
Turnout		8,677	93.00%	10.02%
Registered electors		9,489		22.79%
UDA gain from Independent		Swing	-0.71%	

=== 1974 Assembly election ===
1974 Nagaland Legislative Assembly election: Longleng
Party	Candidate	Votes	%	±%
Independent	N. Metpong Phom	1,618	26.21%	
Independent	A. L. Chongko Phom	1,381	22.37%	
UDA	Chenlom Phom	1,325	21.46%	
NNO	Oditemba Phom	1,126	18.24%	
Independent	Y. Mangkoangba Phom	723	11.71%	
Margin of victory		237	3.84%	
Turnout		6,173	82.98%	
Registered electors		7,728		
Independent win (new seat)				

== See also ==
- List of constituencies of the Nagaland Legislative Assembly
- Longleng district
