= Nagaland Democratic Party =

The Nagaland Democratic Party was a political party in the Indian state of Nagaland. The NDP was founded in 1999. The convenor of the party was Roland Lotha.

In the 2003 state assembly elections, the NDP contested as a part of the NPF-led Democratic Alliance of Nagaland.

On 22 March 2004, the NDP merged into the Nagaland Peoples Front.
