= G. Kaito Aye =

Indian politician

Cabinet Minister, Government of Nagaland
- Incumbent
- Assumed office 7 March 2023
- Governor: La. Ganesan
- Cabinet: Fifth Rio ministry
- Chief Minister: Neiphiu Rio
- Ministry and Departments: Roads and Bridges
- In office 7 March 2018 – March 2023
- Governor: Padmanabha Acharya; R. N. Ravi; Jagdish Mukhi; La. Ganesan
- Cabinet: Fourth Rio ministry
- Chief Minister: Neiphiu Rio
- Ministry and Departments: Agriculture; Cooperation

Member of the Nagaland Legislative Assembly
- Incumbent
- Assumed office 1998
- Preceded by: Kaito
- Constituency: Satakha

Personal details
- Party: Naga People's Front (2025-present)
- Other political affiliations: Indian National Congress (1998-2008); Naga People’s Front (2008-2018); Janata Dal (United) (2018-2022)
- Occupation: Politician

G. Kaito Aye is a Naga People's Front politician from Nagaland. He is currently serving as a Cabinet minister in the Government of Nagaland and member of Nagaland Legislative Assembly representing Satakha.

== Political career ==
He has been elected to the Nagaland Legislative Assembly in the 1998, 2003 election as a candidate of the Indian National Congress, in 2008 and 2013 as a candidate of the Naga People’s Front (NFP), in 2018 as a candidate of the Janata Dal (United), and as a candidate of the Nationalist Democratic Progressive Party in 2023 from the Satakha Assembly constituency. G Kaito Aye, the Minister for Roads and Bridges quit the NPF party on 15 February 2018 and joined the JDU. He is the minister of Agriculture and Cooperative in the Fourth Neiphiu Rio ministry from 2018.
