= Khriehu Liezietsu =

Indian politician

Khriehu Liezietsu is an Indian politician from Nagaland. He represented the Northern Angami I Assembly constituency for two terms, representing the Naga People's Front.

== Political life ==
Khriehu Liezietsu joined the Naga People's Front Party. He was the Parliament Secretary for Youth Resources and Sports, State Lotteries and Music Task Force in Nagaland Government. He has won state assembly elections twice from the Northern Angami I Assembly constituency.

In the 2023 Nagaland Legislative Assembly election Liezietsu lost the Northern Angami I seat to Kekhrielhoulie Yhome by a margin of 1690 votes.
