= Kejong Chang =

Indian politician (1934–2025)

Member of the Nagaland Legislative Assembly
- In office 2007 – 20 February 2025
- Preceded by: A. Lakiumong
- Constituency: Tuensang Sadar-2

Personal details
- Born: 7 May 1934
- Died: 20 February 2025 (aged 90) Dimapur, Nagaland, India
- Party: Nationalist Democratic Progressive Party
- Parent: L Topong (father)
- Profession: Social Worker

Kejong Chang (7 May 1934 – 20 February 2025) was an Indian politician from Nagaland. He was elected to the Nagaland Legislative Assembly representing Tuensang Sadar-2 Assembly constituency in the 1998 election, 2007 by poll, 2008 election, 2009 by poll, 2013 election and 2018 election. Chang was born on 7 May 1934.

== Death ==
He died in Dimapur on 20 February 2025, at the age of 90.
