= Satakha Assembly constituency =

Legislative Assembly constituency in Nagaland State, India

Coordinates: 25.93°N 94.44°E

Satakha
- Constituency No. 36 for the Nagaland Legislative Assembly

Constituency details
- Country: India
- Region: Northeast India
- State: Nagaland
- District: Zünheboto
- Lok Sabha constituency: Nagaland
- Established: 1964
- Total electors: 18,439
- Reservation: ST

Member of Legislative Assembly
- 14th Nagaland Legislative Assembly
- Incumbent G. Kaito Aye
- Party: NPF
- Alliance: NDA
- Elected year: 2023

Satakha is one of the 60 Legislative Assembly constituencies of Nagaland state in India.

It is part of Zünheboto district and is reserved for candidates belonging to the Scheduled Tribes.

== Members of the Legislative Assembly ==
Year	Member	Party
1964	Yeshito	Independent politician
1969	Yeshito	Nagaland Nationalist Organisation
1974	Hokheto Sema	Independent politician
1977	Kaito	Indian National Congress
1982	Hokheto	Naga National Democratic Party
1987	Hokheto	Indian National Congress
1989	Hokheto Sema	Indian National Congress
1993	G. Kughvi	Naga People's Front
1998	Kaito	Indian National Congress
2003	Kaito	Indian National Congress
2008	G. Kaito Aye	Naga People's Front
2013	G. Kaito Aye	Naga People's Front
2018	G. Kaito Aye	Janata Dal
2023	G. Kaito Aye	Nationalist Democratic Progressive Party

== Election results ==
=== 2023 Assembly election ===
2023 Nagaland Legislative Assembly election: Satakha
Party	Candidate	Votes	%	±%
NDPP	G. Kaito Aye	8,875	53.99%	31.92%
LJP(RV)	Zheito Chophy	7,524	45.77%	
NOTA	Nota	39	0.24%	
Margin of victory		1,351	8.22%	−10.75%
Turnout		16,438	89.15%	6.35%
Registered electors		18,439		13.90%
NDPP gain from JD(U)		Swing	6.01%	

=== 2018 Assembly election ===
2018 Nagaland Legislative Assembly election: Satakha
Party	Candidate	Votes	%	±%
JD(U)	G. Kaito Aye	6,431	47.98%	
NPF	Zheito Chophy	3,888	29.01%	−45.54%
NDPP	Er. Ghukhui Zhimomi	2,959	22.08%	
NOTA	None of the Above	126	0.94%	
Margin of victory		2,543	18.97%	−30.17%
Turnout		13,404	82.80%	−8.21%
Registered electors		16,189		1.02%
JD(U) gain from NPF		Swing	-26.57%	

=== 2013 Assembly election ===
2013 Nagaland Legislative Assembly election: Satakha
Party	Candidate	Votes	%	±%
NPF	G. Kaito Aye	10,873	74.55%	16.85%
INC	Vitoho Zhimomi	3,705	25.40%	−19.34%
Margin of victory		7,168	49.15%	36.18%
Turnout		14,585	91.01%	8.70%
Registered electors		16,026		−0.13%
NPF hold		Swing	16.85%	

=== 2008 Assembly election ===
2008 Nagaland Legislative Assembly election: Satakha
Party	Candidate	Votes	%	±%
NPF	G. Kaito Aye	7,621	57.70%	24.84%
INC	Inavi	5,909	44.74%	3.85%
Margin of victory		1,712	12.96%	4.94%
Turnout		13,208	84.31%	2.97%
Registered electors		16,047		37.26%
NPF gain from INC		Swing	16.82%	

=== 2003 Assembly election ===
2003 Nagaland Legislative Assembly election: Satakha
Party	Candidate	Votes	%	±%
INC	Kaito	3,792	40.88%	
NPF	Kughavi	3,048	32.86%	
NDM	Inavi	2,274	24.52%	
BJP	Vihoshe	161	1.74%	
Margin of victory		744	8.02%	
Turnout		9,275	79.33%	79.33%
Registered electors		11,691		12.90%
INC hold		Swing	-1.44%	

=== 1998 Assembly election ===
1998 Nagaland Legislative Assembly election: Satakha
Party	Candidate	Votes	%	±%
INC	Kaito	Unopposed		
Registered electors		10,355		43.10%
INC gain from NPF		Swing		

=== 1993 Assembly election ===
1993 Nagaland Legislative Assembly election: Satakha
Party	Candidate	Votes	%	±%
NPF	G. Kughvi	2,848	42.32%	−5.29%
Independent	Asheto	2,255	33.51%	
INC	Hokheto	1,626	24.16%	−28.22%
Margin of victory		593	8.81%	4.05%
Turnout		6,729	93.57%	4.01%
Registered electors		7,236		6.82%
NPF gain from INC		Swing	-10.06%	

=== 1989 Assembly election ===
1989 Nagaland Legislative Assembly election: Satakha
Party	Candidate	Votes	%	±%
INC	Hokheto Sema	3,088	52.38%	3.68%
NPF	Kughavi	2,807	47.62%	
Margin of victory		281	4.77%	4.25%
Turnout		5,895	89.56%	0.47%
Registered electors		6,774		0.00%
INC hold		Swing	3.68%	

=== 1987 Assembly election ===
1987 Nagaland Legislative Assembly election: Satakha
Party	Candidate	Votes	%	±%
INC	Hokheto	2,902	48.70%	21.19%
NND	Kughavi	2,871	48.18%	16.65%
NPP	Phoishe	180	3.02%	
Margin of victory		31	0.52%	−3.49%
Turnout		5,959	89.09%	1.07%
Registered electors		6,774		−20.53%
INC gain from NND		Swing	17.17%	

=== 1982 Assembly election ===
1982 Nagaland Legislative Assembly election: Satakha
Party	Candidate	Votes	%	±%
NND	Hokheto	2,324	31.52%	
INC	Kaito	2,028	27.51%	−22.61%
Independent	Kughavi	1,570	21.30%	
Independent	Hokuto	1,316	17.85%	
Independent	Vikuto	134	1.82%	
Margin of victory		296	4.02%	3.78%
Turnout		7,372	88.02%	1.96%
Registered electors		8,524		27.60%
NND gain from INC		Swing	-18.59%	

=== 1977 Assembly election ===
1977 Nagaland Legislative Assembly election: Satakha
Party	Candidate	Votes	%	±%
INC	Kaito	2,824	50.12%	
UDA	Hokheto Sema	2,811	49.88%	
Margin of victory		13	0.23%	−9.17%
Turnout		5,635	86.06%	2.82%
Registered electors		6,680		−3.09%
INC gain from Independent		Swing	1.97%	

=== 1974 Assembly election ===
1974 Nagaland Legislative Assembly election: Satakha
Party	Candidate	Votes	%	±%
Independent	Hokheto Sema	2,678	48.15%	
NNO	K. Yeshiito Sema	2,155	38.75%	−3.15%
Independent	Phoishe	729	13.11%	
Margin of victory		523	9.40%	7.52%
Turnout		5,562	83.24%	9.21%
Registered electors		6,893		29.32%
Independent gain from NNO		Swing	6.25%	

=== 1969 Assembly election ===
1969 Nagaland Legislative Assembly election: Satakha
Party	Candidate	Votes	%	±%
NNO	Yeshito	1,650	41.90%	
Independent	Avito Kibami	1,576	40.02%	
Independent	Ahoto Sema	666	16.91%	
Independent	Bohovi Sema	46	1.17%	
Margin of victory		74	1.88%	
Turnout		3,938	74.03%	74.03%
Registered electors		5,330		58.07%
NNO gain from Independent		Swing		

=== 1964 Assembly election ===
1964 Nagaland Legislative Assembly election: Satakha
Party	Candidate	Votes	%	±%
Independent	Yeshito	Unopposed		
Registered electors		3,372		
Independent win (new seat)				

== See also ==
- List of constituencies of the Nagaland Legislative Assembly
- Zunheboto district
