= Noksen Assembly constituency =

Legislative Assembly constituency in Nagaland State, India

Coordinates: 26°32′00″N 94°50′00″E

Noksen
- Constituency No. 51 for the Nagaland Legislative Assembly

Constituency details
- Country: India
- Region: Northeast India
- State: Nagaland
- District: Tuensang
- Lok Sabha constituency: Nagaland
- Established: 1974
- Total electors: 12,455
- Reservation: ST

Member of Legislative Assembly
- 14th Nagaland Legislative Assembly
- Incumbent Y. Lima Onen Chang
- Party: RPI(A)
- Alliance: NDA
- Elected year: 2023

Noksen is one of the 60 Legislative Assembly constituencies of Nagaland state in India. It is part of Tuensang district and is reserved for candidates belonging to the Scheduled Tribes.

It was the first assembly seat in India, where Voter-verified paper audit trail (VVPAT) system was first used with EVMs in a by-poll in September 2013. In October 2013, Supreme Court of India gave a landmark judgement directing Election Commission of India to use VVPAT system for vote validation in phased manner in all subsequent elections in India.

== Members of the Legislative Assembly ==
Year	Member	Party
1974	I. L. Chingmak	Nagaland Nationalist Organisation
1977	C. Chongshen	Indian National Congress
1982	C. Chongshen	Indian National Congress
1987	C. Chongshen	Indian National Congress
1989	C. Chongshen	Indian National Congress
1993	H. Chuba Chang	Indian National Congress
1998	H. Chuba Chang	Indian National Congress
2003	H. Chuba Chang	Indian National Congress
2008	H. Chuba Chang	Indian National Congress
2013	C. M. Chang	Nagaland Peoples Front
September 2013	C. M. Chang	Nagaland Peoples Front
2018	C. M. Chang	Nationalist Democratic Progressive Party
2021	H. Chuba Chang	Nationalist Democratic Progressive Party
2023	Y. Lima Onen Chang	Republican Party of India

== Election results ==
=== 2023 Assembly election ===
2023 Nagaland Legislative Assembly election: Noksen
Party	Candidate	Votes	%	±%
RPI(A)	Y. Lima Onen Chang	5,151	50.73%	
NDPP	H. Chuba Chang	4,963	48.88%	4.77%
NOTA	Nota	39	0.38%	
Margin of victory		188	1.85%	−3.88%
Turnout		10,153	81.52%	−4.85%
Registered electors		12,455		6.97%
RPI(A) gain from NDPP		Swing	6.62%	

=== 2021 Assembly by-election ===
H. Chuba Chang of the Nationalist Democratic Progressive Party was declared the winner unopposed, on 3 April 2020 since he was the only candidate to file his nomination papers.

=== 2018 Assembly election ===
2018 Nagaland Legislative Assembly election: Noksen
Party	Candidate	Votes	%	±%
NDPP	C. M. Chang	4,436	44.11%	
NPF	W. Chingmak Chang	3,860	38.39%	−10.64%
INC	I. Noksenlemba	1,008	10.02%	−0.99%
NPP	Dr. K. Mangyangpula Chang	725	7.21%	
NOTA	None of the Above	27	0.27%	
Margin of victory		576	5.73%	−3.83%
Turnout		10,056	86.37%	−8.16%
Registered electors		11,643		−3.68%
NDPP gain from NPF		Swing	-4.91%	

=== 2013 Assembly by-election ===
The by-elections happened on 4 September 2013. The polling percentage was 70.3. Noksen constituency has 12,074 voters, including 6,142 men and 5,832 women, with 21 polling stations spread over 19 villages. 42 VVPAT machines were used during the by-election. Congress fielded Lima Onen Chang as its candidate for the by-poll. C M Chang won the by-election by a margin of 2,863 votes. Chang has to vacate his assembly seat earlier to remain as Lok Sabha MP till the by-election is held for Noksen to avoid parliamentary by-election in Nagaland.

Nagaland assembly by-elections, 2013: Noksen
Party	Candidate	Votes	%	±%
NPF	C. M. Chang	5708	49.27	
INC	Lima Onen Chang	2845	29.66	

=== 2013 Assembly election ===
C. M. Chang of Nagaland People's Front was elected as MLA from Noksen(ST) seat in February 2013. The by-election to Noksen assembly constituency was necessitated following resignation of Minister for School Education C. M. Chang on 14 March 2013.

2013 Nagaland Legislative Assembly election: Noksen
Party	Candidate	Votes	%	±%
NPF	C. M. Chang	5,602	49.02%	17.10%
NCP	Lima Onen Chang	4,510	39.47%	
INC	H. Chuba Chang	1,259	11.02%	−21.82%
Margin of victory		1,092	9.56%	8.64%
Turnout		11,427	94.53%	16.75%
Registered electors		12,088		3.33%
NPF gain from INC		Swing	16.19%	

=== 2008 Assembly election ===
2008 Nagaland Legislative Assembly election: Noksen
Party	Candidate	Votes	%	±%
INC	H. Chuba Chang	2,988	32.84%	−23.33%
NPF	C. M. Chang	2,905	31.92%	−11.91%
RJD	Changlemba	1,741	19.13%	
BJP	Y. Lima	1,546	16.99%	
Margin of victory		83	0.91%	−11.42%
Turnout		9,100	78.47%	−21.03%
Registered electors		11,699		44.88%
INC hold		Swing	-23.33%	

=== 2003 Assembly election ===
2003 Nagaland Legislative Assembly election: Noksen
Party	Candidate	Votes	%	±%
INC	H. Chuba Chang	4,478	56.16%	−13.21%
NPF	C. M. Chang	3,495	43.84%	
Margin of victory		983	12.33%	−26.43%
Turnout		7,973	98.81%	0.23%
Registered electors		8,075		19.08%
INC hold		Swing	1.19%	

=== 1998 Assembly election ===
1998 Nagaland Legislative Assembly election: Noksen
Party	Candidate	Votes	%	±%
INC	H. Chuba Chang	4,624	69.38%	14.40%
Independent	Nokshang	2,041	30.62%	
Margin of victory		2,583	38.75%	28.80%
Turnout		6,665	98.58%	3.70%
Registered electors		6,781		23.40%
INC hold		Swing	14.40%	

=== 1993 Assembly election ===
1993 Nagaland Legislative Assembly election: Noksen
Party	Candidate	Votes	%	±%
INC	H. Chuba Chang	2,838	54.98%	−31.18%
NPF	C. Chongshen Chang	2,324	45.02%	31.18%
Margin of victory		514	9.96%	−62.36%
Turnout		5,162	94.89%	−2.76%
Registered electors		5,495		20.00%
INC hold		Swing	-31.18%	

=== 1989 Assembly election ===
1989 Nagaland Legislative Assembly election: Noksen
Party	Candidate	Votes	%	±%
INC	C. Chongshen Chang	3,809	86.16%	35.57%
NPF	S. Sao Chang	612	13.84%	
Margin of victory		3,197	72.31%	52.71%
Turnout		4,421	97.64%	2.65%
Registered electors		4,579		0.97%
INC hold		Swing	35.57%	

=== 1987 Assembly election ===
1987 Nagaland Legislative Assembly election: Noksen
Party	Candidate	Votes	%	±%
INC	C. Chongshen Chang	2,144	50.59%	0.53%
Independent	H. Chuba Chang	1,313	30.98%	
NND	S. Sao Chang	781	18.43%	−6.28%
Margin of victory		831	19.61%	−5.22%
Turnout		4,238	94.99%	12.80%
Registered electors		4,535		−28.14%
INC hold		Swing	0.53%	

=== 1982 Assembly election ===
1982 Nagaland Legislative Assembly election: Noksen
Party	Candidate	Votes	%	±%
INC	C. Chongshen Chang	2,569	50.06%	3.69%
Independent	I. L. Ghingmak	1,295	25.23%	
NND	M. P. Nokshang Chang	1,268	24.71%	
Margin of victory		1,274	24.82%	10.75%
Turnout		5,132	82.19%	−10.65%
Registered electors		6,311		39.04%
INC hold		Swing	3.69%	

=== 1977 Assembly election ===
1977 Nagaland Legislative Assembly election: Noksen
Party	Candidate	Votes	%	±%
INC	C. Chongshen Chang	1,918	46.37%	
Independent	I. L. Chingmak	1,336	32.30%	
UDA	P. Nokshang	863	20.87%	20.31%
Independent	L. N. Somba	19	0.46%	
Margin of victory		582	14.07%	−8.10%
Turnout		4,136	92.84%	0.78%
Registered electors		4,539		3.84%
INC gain from NNO		Swing	-14.44%	

=== 1974 Assembly election ===
1974 Nagaland Legislative Assembly election: Noksen
Party	Candidate	Votes	%	±%
NNO	I. L. Chingmak	2,416	60.81%	
Independent	Chungshen Chang	1,535	38.64%	
UDA	Imti Hopong	22	0.55%	
Margin of victory		881	22.17%	
Turnout		3,973	92.06%	
Registered electors		4,371		
NNO win (new seat)				

== See also ==
- List of constituencies of the Nagaland Legislative Assembly
- Tuensang district
- Nagaland (Lok Sabha constituency)
- Mokokchung
- 2013 Mizoram Legislative Assembly election
- 2013 Nagaland Legislative Assembly election
