= H. Chuba Chang =

Indian politician

Member of Nagaland Legislative Assembly
- Incumbent
- Assumed office 2021
- Preceded by: C. M. Chang
- Constituency: Noksen

Personal details
- Born: H. Chuba Chang
- Party: Naga People's Front
- Profession: Politician

H. Chuba Chang is a Naga People's Front politician from Nagaland, India. He has been elected to the Nagaland Legislative Assembly in the 2021 by-election, and the 2008, 2003, 1998 and 1993 state assembly elections from the Noksen constituency. He won the 2021 by-election unopposed after the death of C. M. Chang due to complications from COVID-19.
