= Zahoor Ahmad Mir =

Indian politician

Minister Forests, Environment, Ecology
- In office 2016–2018
- Governor: Narinder Nath Vohra
- Chief Minister: Mehbooba Mufti

Member Jammu and Kashmir Legislative Assembly
- In office 2014–2018
- Governor: Narinder Nath Vohra
- Chief Minister: Mehbooba Mufti
- Constituency: Pampore

Member Jammu and Kashmir Legislative Assembly
- In office 2008–2014
- Governor: Narinder Nath Vohra
- Chief Minister: Omar Abdullah
- Constituency: Pampore

Member Jammu and Kashmir Legislative Assembly
- In office 2003–2008
- Governor: Srinivas Kumar Sinha
- Chief Minister: Mufti Mohammad Sayeed
- Constituency: Pampore

Personal details
- Born: February 24, 1972 (age 54) Konibal, Jammu and Kashmir
- Party: Jammu and Kashmir Peoples Democratic Party
- Parent: Abdul Aziz Mir (father)
- Education: 12th

Zahoor Ahmad Mir (born 24 February 1972) is an Indian politician, social activist and the former member of Jammu and Kashmir Legislative Assembly. He represented Pampore assembly constituency of Pulwama district thrice in 2003, 2008 and 2014 until PDP-BJP alliance ended in 2018.

A member of Jammu and Kashmir Peoples Democratic Party, he was appointed the state minister for Forests, Environment and Ecology. He also served minister for Animal & Sheep Husbandry minister and Cooperative and Fisheries.

== Biography ==
He was born on 24 February 1972 to Abdul Aziz Mir in Konibal area of Jammu and Kashmir. He did his secondary education from the Jammu and Kashmir State Board of School Education in 1994.

In 2007, he was awarded the Certificate of Excellence and Rashtriya Gaurav Award in recognition of his contribution to the Economic Growth and National Integration. He was presented the awards by Bhishma Narain Singh, former governor of Assam and Tamil Nadu during a seminar Economic Growth and National Integration held in New Delhi. He also became the recipient of Adarsh Yuva Vidhayak Puraskar presented by Indian Student Parliament in recognition of his contribution to promote parliamentary system.
