= S. Pangnyu Phom =

Indian politician

S. Pangnyu Phom is an Indian politician from Nagaland. He has been elected to the Nagaland Legislative Assembly in the 2008, 2013 and 2018 elections from the Longleng constituency as a candidate of the Bharatiya Janata Party. He was minister of Health and Family Welfare in the Fourth Neiphiu Rio ministry from 2018 to 2023.
