= Imtilemba Sangtam =

Indian politician (1945–2020)

Imtilemba Sangtam (25 December 1945 – 13 February 2020) was an Indian politician and member of the Bharatiya Janata Party. Sangtam was a member of the Nagaland Legislative Assembly from the Longkhim Chare constituency in Tuensang district. He later joined the Nationalist Congress Party and was state president of NCP Nagaland.

== Personal Background ==
Imtilemba Sangtam was born on 25 December 1945. He hailed from Chimonger village in Tuensang District. He was a postgraduate from Cotton College, Guwahati and contested Nagaland Legislative Assembly elections three times from the 52 Longkhim Chare constituency in Tuensang district. He had served as minister of Transport, Labour and Employment, Evaluation and Statistics from 2003 to 2008 and minister of Cooperation, Relief and Rehabilitation from 2013 to 2018.

He died on 14 February 2020 at Christian Institute of Health Sciences and Research after a prolonged illness. He is survived by his wife, son and two grandchildren.
