= C. M. Chang =

Indian politician (1942–2020)

Chongshen Mongkosungkum Chang

Member of the Nagaland Legislative Assembly
- In office 23 February 2014 – 12 October 2020
- Preceded by: H. Chuba Chang
- Succeeded by: H. Chuba Chang

Member of Parliament of the Lok Sabha
- In office 25 May 2009 – 23 February 2014
- Preceded by: W. Wangyuh
- Succeeded by: Neiphiu Rio
- Constituency: Nagaland

Personal details
- Born: Chongshen Mongkosungkum Chang Noksen
- Died: Kohima, Nagaland
- Cause of death: Complications from Covid19
- Resting place: Noksen, Tuensang District
- Citizenship: India
- Party: Nationalist Democratic Progressive Party
- Spouse: Alema
- Children: 10 (5 sons, and 5 daughters)

Chongshen Mongkosungkum Chang (1 April 1942 – 12 October 2020) was an Indian politician from Nagaland. He belonged to the Nationalist Democratic Progressive Party.

== Early life ==
Chang was born in Noksen in Tuensang district. He graduated from Guwahati University. He married Mrs. Alemla and they had five sons and five daughters. They lived in Dimapur. He died at Naga Hospital Authority, Kohima due to typhoid fever and complications from COVID-19 during the COVID-19 pandemic in India.

== Career ==
Chang served as an Indian Administrative Service officer. He worked as Secretary in the Department of Youth Resources and Sports in the Government of Nagaland. He retired from this position in 2002 to contest his first unsuccessful Nagaland Legislative Assembly (NLA) General Election in 2003. He lost for the second time in the 2008 general election.

In the 2009 election he was elected to the 15th Lok Sabha from the Nagaland Lok Sabha constituency. In the 2013 Nagaland Legislative Assembly elections, he was elected from 51/Noksen (Vidhan Sabha constituency) and became Minister of Education. He contested the 2003, 2008, and 2013 general elections as well as the 2009 Lok Sabha election from the NPF party ticket. In 2018, he joined the Nationalist Democratic Progressive Party and won the general election for NLA for the second time and was appointed Minister for Environment, Forest & Climate Change, and Justice & Law.
