= Democratic Alliance of Nagaland =

Nagaland Democratic Alliance
- Founder: Neiphiu Rio
- Founded: 2003
- Succeeded by: United Democratic Alliance (Nagaland)
- Ideology: Regionalism
- Seats in Nagaland Legislative Assembly: 60 / 60

The Democratic Alliance of Nagaland is a state level coalition of political parties in Nagaland. It headed the Nagaland government with the Bharatiya Janata Party (BJP). It is formed in 2003 after Nagaland Legislative Assembly election with Naga People's Front (NPF) and BJP. The alliance is in power in Nagaland since 2003.

== Present Members and Seats in Nagaland Assembly ==
No	Party	Current No. of MLAs in Nagaland Assembly
1	Naga People's Front	41
2	Bharatiya Janata Party	12
3	Independent	1
-	Total	54

== Chief Ministers ==
No	Name	Term of office		Party	Days in office
1	Neiphiu Rio	6 March 2003	3 January 2008	Nagaland People's Front	1767 days
(1)	Neiphiu Rio	12 March 2008	24 May 2014	Nagaland People's Front	2264 days
2	T. R. Zeliang	24 May 2014	22 February 2017	Nagaland People's Front	1005 days
3	Shurhozelie Liezietsu	22 February 2017	19 July 2017	Nagaland People's Front	147 days
(2)	T. R. Zeliang	19 July 2017	8 March 2018	Nagaland People's Front	232 days
(1)	Neiphiu Rio	8 March 2018	6 March 2023	Nationalist Democratic Progressive Party	1824 days
(1)	Neiphiu Rio	7 March 2023	18 October 2025	Nationalist Democratic Progressive Party	956 days
(1)	Neiphiu Rio	18 October 2025	Incumbent	Naga People's Front	343 days

== Indian general election, 2014 ==
Chief Minister of Nagaland that time, Neiphiu Rio has been chosen as the candidate of Democratic Alliance of Nagaland's for the lone Lok Sabha constituency of the state. Rio defeated closest Indian National Congress rival K.V. Pusa by 4,00,225 votes, which is the second highest winning margin after Narendra Modi in the country.
