= Chozuba Assembly constituency =

Legislative Assembly constituency in Nagaland State, India

Coordinates: 25.73°N 94.32°E

Chozuba
- Constituency No. 18 for the Nagaland Legislative Assembly

Constituency details
- Country: India
- Region: Northeast India
- State: Nagaland
- District: Phek
- Lok Sabha constituency: Nagaland
- Established: 1964
- Total electors: 25,714
- Reservation: ST

Member of Legislative Assembly
- 14th Nagaland Legislative Assembly
- Incumbent Küdecho Khamo
- Party: NPF
- Alliance: NDA
- Elected year: 2023

Chozuba is one of the 60 Legislative Assembly constituencies of Nagaland state in India.

It is part of Phek district and is reserved for candidates belonging to the Scheduled Tribes.

== Members of the Legislative Assembly ==
=== Chozuba I ===
Year	Member	Party
1964	Pudenu Demo	Independent politician
1969	Vamuzo	United Front of Nagaland

=== Chozuba II ===
Year	Member	Party
1964	Netsutso Theyo	Independent politician
1969	Punuhu	Independent politician

=== Chizami ===
Year	Member	Party
1964	Lhusetsu	Independent politician
1969	Wetezulo Naro	Independent politician
1974	Yevehu Lohe	United Democratic Alliance
1977	Soyie	United Democratic Alliance
1982	Zhovehu Lohe	Independent politician
1987	Zhovehu Lohe	Indian National Congress
1989	K. G. Kenye	Naga People's Front
1993	Zhovehu Lohe	Indian National Congress
1998	Zhovehu Lohe	Indian National Congress
2003	Deo Nukhu	Samata Party
2008	Deo Nukhu	Indian National Congress
2013	Deo Nukhu	Naga People's Front
2018	Kezhienyi Khalo	Naga People's Front
2023	Küdecho Khamo	Nationalist Democratic Progressive Party

== Election results ==
=== 2023 Assembly election ===
2023 Nagaland Legislative Assembly election: Chizami
Party	Candidate	Votes	%	±%
NDPP	K. G. Kenye	7,088	43.28%	
LJP(RV)	Kevechutso Doulo	5,809	35.47%	
NPP	Vevoyi Wideo	3,310	20.21%	9.27%
NPF	Kezhienyi Khalo	104	0.64%	−42.45%
NOTA	Nota	65	0.40%	
Margin of victory		1,279	7.81%	5.16%
Turnout		16,376	92.65%	3.49%
Registered electors		17,676		3.47%
NDPP gain from NPF		Swing	0.19%	

=== 2018 Assembly election ===
2018 Nagaland Legislative Assembly election: Chizami
Party	Candidate	Votes	%	±%
NPF	Kezhienyi Khalo	6,563	43.09%	8.72%
BJP	Kevechutso Doulo	6,160	40.44%	
NPP	Deo Nukhu	1,667	10.94%	
INC	Kewepelo Tsuhah	471	3.09%	−5.90%
Independent	Rekha Rose Dukru	338	2.22%	
NOTA	None of the Above	32	0.21%	
Margin of victory		403	2.65%	−0.02%
Turnout		15,231	89.15%	−5.48%
Registered electors		17,084		−2.44%
NPF hold		Swing	8.72%	

=== 2013 Assembly election ===
2013 Nagaland Legislative Assembly election: Chizami
Party	Candidate	Votes	%	±%
NPF	Deo Nukhu	5,695	34.37%	−4.03%
Independent	Kevechutso Doulo	5,253	31.70%	
NCP	Zhovehu Lohe	4,128	24.91%	
INC	Vetetso Lasuh	1,490	8.99%	−30.25%
Margin of victory		442	2.67%	1.82%
Turnout		16,572	94.64%	0.06%
Registered electors		17,511		−19.94%
NPF gain from INC		Swing	-4.88%	

=== 2008 Assembly election ===
2008 Nagaland Legislative Assembly election: Chizami
Party	Candidate	Votes	%	±%
INC	Deo Nukhu	8,117	39.24%	10.90%
NPF	Kewezu	7,942	38.40%	15.17%
Independent	Kevechutso Doulo	4,671	22.58%	
Margin of victory		175	0.85%	−5.52%
Turnout		20,684	94.78%	−0.06%
Registered electors		21,871		55.65%
INC gain from SAP		Swing	4.53%	

=== 2003 Assembly election ===
2003 Nagaland Legislative Assembly election: Chizami
Party	Candidate	Votes	%	±%
SAP	Deo Nukhu	4,616	34.71%	
INC	Zhovehu Lohe	3,769	28.34%	
NPF	Kewezu	3,089	23.23%	
NCP	Ngosayi S. Deasi	1,823	13.71%	
Margin of victory		847	6.37%	
Turnout		13,297	94.63%	2.21%
Registered electors		14,051		13.62%
SAP gain from INC		Swing	-5.39%	

=== 1998 Assembly election ===
1998 Nagaland Legislative Assembly election: Chizami
Party	Candidate	Votes	%	±%
INC	Zhovehu Lohe	Unopposed		
Registered electors		12,367		12.88%
INC hold		Swing		

=== 1993 Assembly election ===
1993 Nagaland Legislative Assembly election: Chizami
Party	Candidate	Votes	%	±%
INC	Zhovehu Lohe	4,031	40.11%	−2.83%
NPF	Kewezu	3,771	37.52%	−7.36%
Independent	V. Lasuh	2,249	22.38%	
Margin of victory		260	2.59%	0.64%
Turnout		10,051	92.42%	−2.58%
Registered electors		10,956		34.20%
INC gain from NPF		Swing	-4.78%	

=== 1989 Assembly election ===
1989 Nagaland Legislative Assembly election: Chizami
Party	Candidate	Votes	%	±%
NPF	K. G. Kenye	3,463	44.88%	
INC	Zhovehu Lohe	3,313	42.94%	4.19%
Independent	Zaniesto	940	12.18%	
Margin of victory		150	1.94%	−2.35%
Turnout		7,716	95.00%	2.61%
Registered electors		8,164		0.12%
NPF gain from INC		Swing	6.14%	

=== 1987 Assembly election ===
1987 Nagaland Legislative Assembly election: Chizami
Party	Candidate	Votes	%	±%
INC	Zhovehu Lohe	2,872	38.74%	15.58%
NND	K. G. Kenye	2,554	34.45%	7.51%
Independent	Vetetso Lasuh	1,987	26.80%	
Margin of victory		318	4.29%	2.63%
Turnout		7,413	92.40%	4.80%
Registered electors		8,154		6.73%
INC gain from Independent		Swing	10.14%	

=== 1982 Assembly election ===
1982 Nagaland Legislative Assembly election: Chizami
Party	Candidate	Votes	%	±%
Independent	Zhovehu Lohe	1,892	28.61%	
NND	Soyio	1,782	26.94%	
INC	Vetetso Lasuh	1,532	23.16%	
Independent	Khazi	956	14.45%	
Independent	Wekhanyi	357	5.40%	
Independent	Wetezulo Naro	74	1.12%	
Margin of victory		110	1.66%	−0.01%
Turnout		6,614	87.59%	−6.12%
Registered electors		7,640		28.79%
Independent gain from UDA		Swing	-4.78%	

=== 1977 Assembly election ===
1977 Nagaland Legislative Assembly election: Chizami
Party	Candidate	Votes	%	±%
UDA	Soyie	1,831	33.38%	10.21%
Independent	Yevehu Lohe	1,739	31.70%	
Independent	Wetezulo Naro	1,238	22.57%	
NCN	Lhusetsu	677	12.34%	
Margin of victory		92	1.68%	1.29%
Turnout		5,485	93.71%	6.50%
Registered electors		5,932		−7.50%
UDA hold		Swing	10.21%	

=== 1974 Assembly election ===
1974 Nagaland Legislative Assembly election: Chizami
Party	Candidate	Votes	%	±%
UDA	Yevehu Lohe	1,262	23.17%	
Independent	Soyie	1,241	22.78%	
NNO	Lhusetsu	721	13.24%	0.25%
Independent	Vesazo	526	9.66%	
Independent	Wetezulo Naro	517	9.49%	
Independent	Wechuru Wezha	458	8.41%	
Independent	Kewepeulo	367	6.74%	
Independent	Wetezulo Naro	355	6.52%	
Margin of victory		21	0.39%	−14.07%
Turnout		5,447	87.21%	1.42%
Registered electors		6,413		96.84%
UDA gain from Independent		Swing	-13.40%	

=== 1969 Assembly election ===
1969 Nagaland Legislative Assembly election: Chizami
Party	Candidate	Votes	%	±%
Independent	Wetezulo Naro	1,022	36.57%	
Independent	Soyie	618	22.11%	
Independent	Kewepfulo	415	14.85%	
NNO	Lhisetsu Venuh	363	12.99%	
Independent	Weprelo	202	7.23%	
Independent	Rachulo	175	6.26%	
Margin of victory		404	14.45%	−23.72%
Turnout		2,795	85.79%	−5.38%
Registered electors		3,258		19.82%
Independent hold		Swing	-24.33%	

=== 1964 Assembly election ===
1964 Nagaland Legislative Assembly election: Chizami
Party	Candidate	Votes	%	±%
Independent	Lhusetsu	1,509	60.90%	
Independent	Wetezulo Naro	563	22.72%	
Independent	Wetezulo Naro	406	16.38%	
Margin of victory		946	38.18%	
Turnout		2,478	91.17%	
Registered electors		2,719		
Independent win (new seat)				

== Chozuba I ==
=== 1969 Assembly election ===
1969 Nagaland Legislative Assembly election: Chozuba I
Party	Candidate	Votes	%	±%
UDF	Vamuzo	1,575	63.15%	
NNO	Pudenu Demo	919	36.85%	
Margin of victory		656	26.30%	
Turnout		2,494	94.18%	94.18%
Registered electors		2,648		25.02%
UDF gain from Independent		Swing		

=== 1964 Assembly election ===
1964 Nagaland Legislative Assembly election: Chozuba I
Party	Candidate	Votes	%	±%
Independent	Pudenu Demo	Unopposed		
Registered electors		2,118		
Independent win (new seat)				

== Chozuba II ==
=== 1969 Assembly election ===
1969 Nagaland Legislative Assembly election: Chozuba II
Party	Candidate	Votes	%	±%
Independent	Punuhu	860	24.20%	
Independent	Zhovepra Rosetso	842	23.70%	
NNO	Netsutso Theyo	771	21.70%	
Independent	Yefutso	749	21.08%	
Independent	Vepochu	331	9.32%	
Margin of victory		18	0.51%	−29.24%
Turnout		3,553	80.64%	2.72%
Registered electors		4,407		52.65%
Independent hold		Swing	-40.67%	

=== 1964 Assembly election ===
1964 Nagaland Legislative Assembly election: Chozuba II
Party	Candidate	Votes	%	±%
Independent	Netsutso Theyo	1,459	64.87%	
Independent	Phukuve	790	35.13%	
Margin of victory		669	29.75%	
Turnout		2,249	78.35%	
Registered electors		2,887		
Independent win (new seat)				

== See also ==
- List of constituencies of the Nagaland Legislative Assembly
- Phek district
