= Atoizü Assembly constituency =

Legislative constituency in Nagaland, India

Coordinates: 26.07°N 94.48°E

Atoizü
- Constituency No. 32 for the Nagaland Legislative Assembly

Constituency details
- Country: India
- Region: Northeast India
- State: Nagaland
- District: Zünheboto
- Lok Sabha constituency: Nagaland
- Established: 1964
- Total electors: 16,627
- Reservation: ST

Member of Legislative Assembly
- 14th Nagaland Legislative Assembly
- Incumbent Picto Shohe
- Party: NPF
- Alliance: NDA
- Elected year: 2023

Atoizü is one of the 60 Legislative Assembly constituencies of Nagaland state in India.

It is part of Zünheboto district and is reserved for candidates belonging to the Scheduled Tribes.

== Members of the Legislative Assembly ==
Year	Member	Party
1964	Kiyekhu Shikhu	Independent politician
1969	Kiyekhu Shikhu	Nagaland Nationalist Organisation
1974	N. Yeshito Chishi	Independent politician
1977	K. L. Chishi	United Democratic Alliance
1982	K. L. Chishi	Indian National Congress
1987	K. L. Chishi	Indian National Congress
1989	K. L. Chishi	Naga People's Front
1993	K. L. Chishi	Indian National Congress
1998	Doshehe Y. Sema	Indian National Congress
2003	Doshehe Y. Sema	Indian National Congress
2008	Doshehe Y. Sema	Naga People's Front
2013	Picto Shohe	Independent politician
2018	Picto Shohe	Naga People's Front
2023	Picto Shohe	Nationalist Congress Party

== Election results ==
=== 2023 Assembly election ===
2023 Nagaland Legislative Assembly election: Atoizu
Party	Candidate	Votes	%	±%
NCP	Picto Shohe	8,294	51.83%	
BJP	Er Kahuli Sema	7,692	48.07%	1.04%
NOTA	Nota	16	0.10%	
Margin of victory		602	3.76%	−2.03%
Turnout		16,002	96.24%	3.46%
Registered electors		16,627		6.62%
NCP gain from NPF		Swing	-0.99%	

=== 2018 Assembly election ===
2018 Nagaland Legislative Assembly election: Atoizu
Party	Candidate	Votes	%	±%
NPF	Picto Shohe	7,643	52.82%	16.07%
BJP	Kiyezhe L. Chishi	6,805	47.03%	
NOTA	None of the Above	21	0.15%	
Margin of victory		838	5.79%	−15.45%
Turnout		14,469	92.79%	−3.38%
Registered electors		15,594		−2.99%
NPF gain from Independent		Swing	-5.17%	

=== 2013 Assembly election ===
2013 Nagaland Legislative Assembly election: Atoizu
Party	Candidate	Votes	%	±%
Independent	Picto Shohe	8,965	57.99%	
NPF	Doshehe Y. Sema	5,681	36.75%	−15.73%
INC	Mghato Achumi	774	5.01%	−43.84%
Margin of victory		3,284	21.24%	17.62%
Turnout		15,459	96.17%	8.29%
Registered electors		16,075		−9.47%
Independent gain from NPF		Swing	5.52%	

=== 2008 Assembly election ===
2008 Nagaland Legislative Assembly election: Atoizu
Party	Candidate	Votes	%	±%
NPF	Doshehe Y. Sema	8,188	52.48%	19.66%
INC	Mghato Achumi	7,622	48.85%	15.17%
Margin of victory		566	3.63%	3.44%
Turnout		15,603	89.04%	0.23%
Registered electors		17,756		63.82%
NPF gain from INC		Swing	18.79%	

=== 2003 Assembly election ===
2003 Nagaland Legislative Assembly election: Atoizu
Party	Candidate	Votes	%	±%
INC	Doshehe Y. Sema	3,200	33.68%	
NDM	Kiyezhe L. Chishi	3,182	33.49%	
NPF	Kikheho	3,118	32.82%	
Margin of victory		18	0.19%	
Turnout		9,500	87.65%	87.65%
Registered electors		10,839		13.12%
INC hold		Swing	-43.38%	

=== 1998 Assembly election ===
1998 Nagaland Legislative Assembly election: Atoizu
Party	Candidate	Votes	%	±%
INC	Doshehe Y. Sema	Unopposed		
Registered electors		9,582		26.03%
INC hold		Swing		

=== 1993 Assembly election ===
1993 Nagaland Legislative Assembly election: Atoizu
Party	Candidate	Votes	%	±%
INC	Kiyezhe L. Chishi	5,453	77.06%	28.57%
NPF	Mihozhe	1,623	22.94%	−28.57%
Margin of victory		3,830	54.13%	51.10%
Turnout		7,076	93.54%	5.29%
Registered electors		7,603		14.19%
INC gain from NPF		Swing	25.55%	

=== 1989 Assembly election ===
1989 Nagaland Legislative Assembly election: Atoizu
Party	Candidate	Votes	%	±%
NPF	Kiyezhe L. Chishi	3,016	51.51%	
INC	Yeshito	2,839	48.49%	0.78%
Margin of victory		177	3.02%	0.91%
Turnout		5,855	88.25%	−2.25%
Registered electors		6,658		0.00%
NPF gain from INC		Swing	3.80%	

=== 1987 Assembly election ===
1987 Nagaland Legislative Assembly election: Atoizu
Party	Candidate	Votes	%	±%
INC	Kiyezhe L. Chishi	2,847	47.71%	20.33%
Independent	N. Yeshito Chishi	2,721	45.60%	
NND	Tovishe	399	6.69%	−19.51%
Margin of victory		126	2.11%	0.93%
Turnout		5,967	90.51%	8.18%
Registered electors		6,658		−19.96%
INC hold		Swing	20.33%	

=== 1982 Assembly election ===
1982 Nagaland Legislative Assembly election: Atoizu
Party	Candidate	Votes	%	±%
INC	Kiyezhe L. Chishi	1,852	27.38%	−17.32%
NND	Khotoheo	1,772	26.20%	
Independent	N. Nihozhe Sohe	1,668	24.66%	
Independent	Yoshito Chishi	1,472	21.76%	
Margin of victory		80	1.18%	−9.42%
Turnout		6,764	82.33%	−2.85%
Registered electors		8,318		28.82%
INC gain from UDA		Swing	-27.92%	

=== 1977 Assembly election ===
1977 Nagaland Legislative Assembly election: Atoizu
Party	Candidate	Votes	%	±%
UDA	Kiyezhe L. Chishi	2,993	55.30%	
INC	Khetoho	2,419	44.70%	
Margin of victory		574	10.61%	8.25%
Turnout		5,412	85.18%	3.88%
Registered electors		6,457		−7.66%
UDA gain from Independent		Swing	15.63%	

=== 1974 Assembly election ===
1974 Nagaland Legislative Assembly election: Atoizu
Party	Candidate	Votes	%	±%
Independent	N. Yeshito Chishi	2,185	39.68%	
NNO	Kiyekhu Shikhu	2,055	37.32%	0.62%
Independent	Lukhuhe	950	17.25%	
Independent	Ilhoshe Khala	317	5.76%	
Margin of victory		130	2.36%	−7.68%
Turnout		5,507	81.30%	0.45%
Registered electors		6,993		24.34%
Independent gain from NNO		Swing	2.98%	

=== 1969 Assembly election ===
1969 Nagaland Legislative Assembly election: Atoizu
Party	Candidate	Votes	%	±%
NNO	Kiyekhu Shikhu	1,666	36.70%	
UDF	Rev. Ilhoshe Khala	1,210	26.65%	
Independent	N. Yeshito Sema	871	19.19%	
Independent	Zhehoshe Sema	793	17.47%	
Margin of victory		456	10.04%	
Turnout		4,540	80.85%	80.85%
Registered electors		5,624		53.03%
NNO gain from Independent		Swing		

=== 1964 Assembly election ===
1964 Nagaland Legislative Assembly election: Atoizu
Party	Candidate	Votes	%	±%
Independent	Kiyekhu Shikhu	Unopposed		
Registered electors		3,675		
Independent win (new seat)				

== See also ==
- List of constituencies of the Nagaland Legislative Assembly
- Zunheboto district
