= Alongtaki Assembly constituency =

Legislative Assembly constituency in Nagaland State, India

Coordinates: 26.55°N 94.44°E

Alongtaki
- Constituency No. 30 for the Nagaland Legislative Assembly

Constituency details
- Country: India
- Region: Northeast India
- State: Nagaland
- District: Mokokchung
- Lok Sabha constituency: Nagaland
- Established: 1964
- Total electors: 16,007
- Reservation: ST

Member of Legislative Assembly
- 14th Nagaland Legislative Assembly
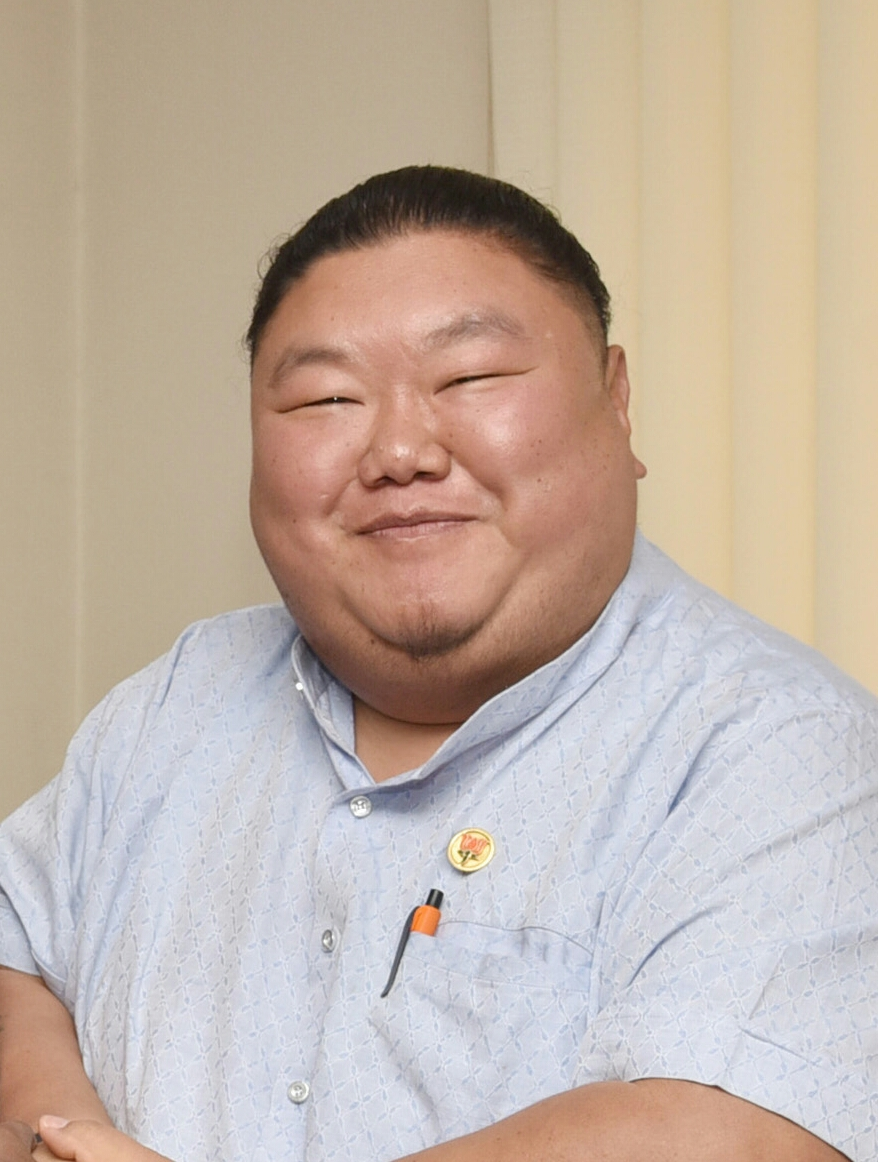
- Incumbent Temjen Imma Along
- Party: Bharatiya Janata Party

Alongtaki is one of the 60 Legislative Assembly constituencies of Nagaland state in India.

It is part of Mokokchung district and is reserved for candidates belonging to the Scheduled Tribes.

== Members of the Legislative Assembly ==
Year	Member	Party
1964	Zulutemba Jamit	Independent
1969	Zulutemba Jamit	Nagaland Nationalist Organisation
1974	Bendangtoshi Ao	United Democratic Alliance
1977	Bendangtoshi Ao	United Democratic Alliance
1982	Tiamaran	Independent
1987	Tiameren Imchen	Indian National Congress
1989	Tiameren Imchen	Indian National Congress
1993	Tongpangnungshi	Independent
1998	Tongpang Nungshi	Indian National Congress
2003	Tiameren	Bharatiya Janata Party
2008	Sakusangba	Naga People's Front
2013	Dr. Benjongliba Aier	Naga People's Front
2018	Temjen Imna Along	Bharatiya Janata Party
2023	Temjen Imna Along	Bharatiya Janata Party

== Election results ==
=== 2023 Assembly election ===
2023 Nagaland Legislative Assembly election: Alongtaki
Party	Candidate	Votes	%	±%
BJP	Temjen Imna Along	9,274	62.50	▲12.32
JD(U)	J. Lanu Longchar	5,526	37.24	New
NOTA	None of the Above	38	0.26	
Margin of victory		3,748	25.26	24.54
Turnout		14,838	92.70	▲9.97
Registered electors		16,007		▲11.11
BJP hold		Swing	12.32	

=== 2018 Assembly election ===
2018 Nagaland Legislative Assembly election: Alongtaki
Party	Candidate	Votes	%	±%
BJP	Temjen Imna Along	5,981	50.18%	
NPF	Dr. Benjongliba Aier	5,895	49.46%	−5.67%
NOTA	None of the Above	43	0.36%	
Margin of victory		86	0.72%	−10.88%
Turnout		11,919	82.73%	−10.25%
Registered electors		14,407		4.21%
BJP gain from NPF		Swing	-4.95%	

=== 2013 Assembly election ===
2013 Nagaland Legislative Assembly election: Alongtaki
Party	Candidate	Votes	%	±%
NPF	Dr. Benjongliba Aier	7,087	55.13%	−4.67%
Independent	Moatoshi Longkumer	5,596	43.53%	
INC	Imlitemsu	172	1.34%	−34.07%
Margin of victory		1,491	11.60%	−12.80%
Turnout		12,855	92.98%	8.75%
Registered electors		13,825		−26.86%
NPF hold		Swing	-4.67%	

=== 2008 Assembly election ===
2008 Nagaland Legislative Assembly election: Alongtaki
Party	Candidate	Votes	%	±%
NPF	Sakusangba	9,521	59.80%	
INC	Tiameren Aier	5,637	35.40%	−4.79%
BJP	Merenchiba	467	2.93%	−56.88%
Independent	Rose Mary Jamir	220	1.38%	
NCP	Imlitemsu	91	0.57%	
Margin of victory		3,884	24.39%	4.77%
Turnout		15,922	84.30%	−1.61%
Registered electors		18,903		30.74%
NPF gain from BJP		Swing	-0.01%	

=== 2003 Assembly election ===
2003 Nagaland Legislative Assembly election: Alongtaki
Party	Candidate	Votes	%	±%
BJP	Tiameren	7,423	59.81%	
INC	T. Saku Aier	4,988	40.19%	
Margin of victory		2,435	19.62%	
Turnout		12,411	85.84%	85.84%
Registered electors		14,459		14.41%
BJP gain from INC		Swing	13.59%	

=== 1998 Assembly election ===
1998 Nagaland Legislative Assembly election: Alongtaki
Party	Candidate	Votes	%	±%
INC	Tongpang Nungshi	Unopposed		
Registered electors		12,638		25.84%
INC gain from Independent		Swing		

=== 1993 Assembly election ===
1993 Nagaland Legislative Assembly election: Alongtaki
Party	Candidate	Votes	%	±%
Independent	Tongpangnungshi	4,605	46.22%	
INC	Tiameren	2,931	29.42%	−26.15%
Independent	Aomeri	2,190	21.98%	
NPF	Imlitemsu	222	2.23%	−42.21%
Margin of victory		1,674	16.80%	5.67%
Turnout		9,963	99.38%	1.20%
Registered electors		10,043		64.86%
Independent gain from INC		Swing	-9.34%	

=== 1989 Assembly election ===
1989 Nagaland Legislative Assembly election: Alongtaki
Party	Candidate	Votes	%	±%
INC	Tiameren Imchen	3,305	55.56%	20.74%
NPF	Imnanungsang	2,643	44.44%	
Margin of victory		662	11.13%	5.94%
Turnout		5,948	98.18%	−0.25%
Registered electors		6,092		−0.05%
INC hold		Swing	20.74%	

=== 1987 Assembly election ===
1987 Nagaland Legislative Assembly election: Alongtaki
Party	Candidate	Votes	%	±%
INC	Tiameren Imchen	2,082	34.83%	4.38%
Independent	Aomeri	1,772	29.64%	
NND	Imnanungsang	1,240	20.74%	−4.40%
NPP	K. Mao Longkumer	884	14.79%	
Margin of victory		310	5.19%	3.89%
Turnout		5,978	98.42%	13.16%
Registered electors		6,095		−7.61%
INC gain from Independent		Swing	3.09%	

=== 1982 Assembly election ===
1982 Nagaland Legislative Assembly election: Alongtaki
Party	Candidate	Votes	%	±%
Independent	Tiamaran	1,769	31.74%	
INC	Bendangtoshi Ao	1,697	30.45%	−13.87%
NND	Nungsang Ao	1,401	25.14%	
Independent	Aomari	693	12.43%	
Margin of victory		72	1.29%	−10.07%
Turnout		5,573	85.27%	−5.94%
Registered electors		6,597		53.45%
Independent gain from UDA		Swing	-23.94%	

=== 1977 Assembly election ===
1977 Nagaland Legislative Assembly election: Alongtaki
Party	Candidate	Votes	%	±%
UDA	Bendangtoshi Ao	2,156	55.68%	16.50%
INC	Tiameren	1,716	44.32%	
Margin of victory		440	11.36%	−5.05%
Turnout		3,872	91.21%	8.36%
Registered electors		4,299		−33.81%
UDA hold		Swing	16.50%	

=== 1974 Assembly election ===
1974 Nagaland Legislative Assembly election: Alongtaki
Party	Candidate	Votes	%	±%
UDA	Bendangtoshi Ao	2,084	39.18%	
NNO	Zulutemba Jamit	1,211	22.77%	−10.86%
Independent	Tiameren Ao	1,130	21.24%	
Independent	K. Mungsangmoren	856	16.09%	
Independent	Reubenson	38	0.71%	
Margin of victory		873	16.41%	7.08%
Turnout		5,319	82.85%	−1.15%
Registered electors		6,495		54.64%
UDA gain from NNO		Swing	5.55%	

=== 1969 Assembly election ===
1969 Nagaland Legislative Assembly election: Alongtaki
Party	Candidate	Votes	%	±%
NNO	Zulutemba Jamit	1,185	33.63%	
Independent	Yimsentsulak	856	24.29%	
Independent	Bendangtoshi Ao	851	24.15%	
UDF	Yongkongnuken	517	14.67%	
Independent	Reubenson	85	2.41%	
Independent	Nokchumeren	30	0.85%	
Margin of victory		329	9.34%	
Turnout		3,524	84.00%	84.00%
Registered electors		4,200		32.83%
NNO gain from Independent		Swing		

=== 1964 Assembly election ===
1964 Nagaland Legislative Assembly election: Alongtaki
Party	Candidate	Votes	%	±%
Independent	Zulutemba Jamit	Unopposed		
Registered electors		3,162		
Independent win (new seat)				

== See also ==
- List of constituencies of the Nagaland Legislative Assembly
- Mokokchung district
