= Noklak Assembly constituency =

Legislative Assembly constituency in Nagaland State, India

Coordinates: 26.2°N 95.02°E

Noklak
- Constituency No. 56 for the Nagaland Legislative Assembly

Constituency details
- Country: India
- Region: Northeast India
- State: Nagaland
- District: Noklak
- Lok Sabha constituency: Nagaland
- Established: 1974
- Total electors: 17,924
- Reservation: ST

Member of Legislative Assembly
- 14th Nagaland Legislative Assembly
- Incumbent P. Longon
- Party: NPF
- Alliance: NDA
- Elected year: 2023

Noklak is one of the 60 Legislative Assembly constituencies of Nagaland state in India.

It is part of Noklak district and is reserved for candidates belonging to the Scheduled Tribes.

== Members of the Legislative Assembly ==
Year	Member	Party
1974	Tochi Hanso	Nagaland Nationalist Organisation
1977	Thangpong	United Democratic Alliance
1982	Thangpong	Naga National Democratic Party
1987	Sedem Khaming	Naga National Democratic Party
1989	Sedem Khaming	Indian National Congress
1993	Sedem Khaming	Naga People's Front
1998	Sedem Khaming	Indian National Congress
2003	P. Longon	Naga People's Front
2008	P. Longon	Naga People's Front
2013	P. Longon	Naga People's Front
2018	H. Haiying	Bharatiya Janata Party
2023	P. Longon	Nationalist Congress Party

== Election results ==
=== 2023 Assembly election ===
2023 Nagaland Legislative Assembly election: Noklak
Party	Candidate	Votes	%	±%
NCP	P. Longon	8,482	52.18%	36.81%
BJP	H. Haiying	7,748	47.67%	7.04%
NOTA	Nota	24	0.15%	
Margin of victory		734	4.52%	4.48%
Turnout		16,254	90.68%	1.41%
Registered electors		17,924		15.19%
NCP gain from BJP		Swing	11.56%	

=== 2018 Assembly election ===
2018 Nagaland Legislative Assembly election: Noklak
Party	Candidate	Votes	%	±%
BJP	H. Haiying	5,643	40.62%	
NPF	P. Longon	5,638	40.59%	−20.15%
NCP	P. Mulang	2,135	15.37%	
JD(U)	K. Khaming	449	3.23%	
NOTA	None of the Above	26	0.19%	
Margin of victory		5	0.04%	−21.86%
Turnout		13,891	89.27%	−8.57%
Registered electors		15,561		0.87%
BJP gain from NPF		Swing	-20.12%	

=== 2013 Assembly election ===
2013 Nagaland Legislative Assembly election: Noklak
Party	Candidate	Votes	%	±%
NPF	P. Longon	9,168	60.74%	0.33%
INC	H. Haiying	5,863	38.84%	22.36%
Margin of victory		3,305	21.90%	−22.02%
Turnout		15,094	97.84%	6.13%
Registered electors		15,427		7.65%
NPF hold		Swing	0.33%	

=== 2008 Assembly election ===
2008 Nagaland Legislative Assembly election: Noklak
Party	Candidate	Votes	%	±%
NPF	P. Longon	7,939	60.40%	5.96%
INC	Sedem Khaming	2,167	16.49%	−29.01%
RJD	H. Haiying	1,727	13.14%	
BJP	Ngon	1,148	8.73%	
Independent	Khaoshai	210	1.60%	
Margin of victory		5,772	43.92%	34.97%
Turnout		13,143	92.05%	−3.68%
Registered electors		14,331		26.94%
NPF hold		Swing	5.96%	

=== 2003 Assembly election ===
2003 Nagaland Legislative Assembly election: Noklak
Party	Candidate	Votes	%	±%
NPF	P. Longon	5,736	54.45%	
INC	Sedem Khaming	4,793	45.50%	
Margin of victory		943	8.95%	
Turnout		10,535	95.39%	95.39%
Registered electors		11,290		13.63%
NPF gain from INC		Swing	14.79%	

=== 1998 Assembly election ===
1998 Nagaland Legislative Assembly election: Noklak
Party	Candidate	Votes	%	±%
INC	Sedem Khaming	Unopposed		
Registered electors		9,936		8.09%
INC gain from NPF		Swing		

=== 1993 Assembly election ===
1993 Nagaland Legislative Assembly election: Noklak
Party	Candidate	Votes	%	±%
NPF	Sedem Khaming	3,427	39.66%	24.72%
INC	W. Chuba Khaim	3,207	37.11%	−6.00%
Independent	Mulang Khiam	2,008	23.24%	
Margin of victory		220	2.55%	1.39%
Turnout		8,642	94.77%	1.32%
Registered electors		9,192		36.54%
NPF gain from INC		Swing	-3.45%	

=== 1989 Assembly election ===
1989 Nagaland Legislative Assembly election: Noklak
Party	Candidate	Votes	%	±%
INC	Sedem Khaming	2,693	43.11%	21.22%
Independent	Tongthan	2,621	41.96%	
NPF	Putsong	933	14.94%	
Margin of victory		72	1.15%	−1.31%
Turnout		6,247	93.45%	−1.10%
Registered electors		6,732		0.18%
INC gain from NND		Swing	11.13%	

=== 1987 Assembly election ===
1987 Nagaland Legislative Assembly election: Noklak
Party	Candidate	Votes	%	±%
NND	Sedem Khaming	1,997	31.98%	7.73%
Independent	Tochi Hanso	1,843	29.52%	
INC	H. Thangpong	1,367	21.89%	2.51%
NPP	Tongthan	1,037	16.61%	
Margin of victory		154	2.47%	−2.41%
Turnout		6,244	94.55%	16.71%
Registered electors		6,720		−24.92%
NND hold		Swing	7.73%	

=== 1982 Assembly election ===
1982 Nagaland Legislative Assembly election: Noklak
Party	Candidate	Votes	%	±%
NND	Thangpong	1,662	24.25%	
INC	John	1,328	19.38%	−6.08%
Independent	C. Nokching	1,262	18.42%	
Independent	Sedem Khaming	1,051	15.34%	
Independent	Chuba	931	13.59%	
Independent	P. Tongthan Khiamngan	619	9.03%	
Margin of victory		334	4.87%	−2.70%
Turnout		6,853	77.85%	−3.68%
Registered electors		8,951		42.33%
NND gain from UDA		Swing	-8.78%	

=== 1977 Assembly election ===
1977 Nagaland Legislative Assembly election: Noklak
Party	Candidate	Votes	%	±%
UDA	Thangpong	1,652	33.03%	−4.15%
INC	John	1,273	25.45%	
Independent	Chuba	1,148	22.96%	
Independent	Allen Chang	497	9.94%	
NCN	Sethem Kheamnungan	431	8.62%	
Margin of victory		379	7.58%	6.26%
Turnout		5,001	81.52%	19.48%
Registered electors		6,289		−14.93%
UDA gain from NNO		Swing	-5.46%	

=== 1974 Assembly election ===
1974 Nagaland Legislative Assembly election: Noklak
Party	Candidate	Votes	%	±%
NNO	Tochi Hanso	1,692	38.50%	
UDA	N. Thangong	1,634	37.18%	
Independent	I. N. Somba	637	14.49%	
Independent	Metsio T. Khemnungan	432	9.83%	
Margin of victory		58	1.32%	
Turnout		4,395	62.05%	
Registered electors		7,393		
NNO win (new seat)				

== See also ==
- List of constituencies of the Nagaland Legislative Assembly
- Tuensang district
