= John Bosco Jasokie =

Indian politician

5th Chief Minister of Nagaland
- In office 10 March 1975 – 20 March 1975
- Preceded by: Vizol Angami
- Succeeded by: President's rule
- In office 5 June 1980 – 18 November 1982
- Preceded by: S. C. Jamir
- Succeeded by: S. C. Jamir

Member of Nagaland Legislative Assembly
- In office 1964–1989
- Succeeded by: K. V. Keditsü
- Constituency: Kohima Town

Personal details
- Born: 1927
- Died: 19 October 2005 (aged 77–78) Kohima, Nagaland, India
- Party: Naga National Democratic Party

Jasokie Zinyü (1927 – 19 October 2005), also known as John Bosco Jasokie, was an Indian politician from the state of Nagaland. He became the Chief Minister of Nagaland on two occasions as part of the Naga National Democratic Party. He was also a music composer and an accomplished singer of his time and is best known for composing the Angami folk song "Ara Kezivi" .

== Biography ==
Jasokie Zinyü was born in 1927 to an Angami Naga family from Khonoma. He was the son of Dr. Khosa Zinyü (the first Naga Surgeon and member of the Naga Labour Corp). He served as a guide for Allied Forces during the World War II.

Zinyü died on 19 October 2005 at his residence in Kohima.

=== Electoral performance ===
1987 Nagaland Legislative Assembly election: Kohima Town
Party	Candidate	Votes	%	±%
INC	John Bosco Jasokie	4,880	53.69%	9.97%
NND	Khrieketoulie	4,210	46.31%	−9.97%
Margin of victory		670	7.37%	−5.20%
Turnout		9,090	60.17%	10.39%
Registered electors		15,513		18.30%
INC gain from NND		Swing	-2.60%	

1982 Nagaland Legislative Assembly election: Kohima Town
Party	Candidate	Votes	%	±%
NND	John Bosco Jasokie	3,574	56.28%	
INC	Khyomo Lotha	2,776	43.72%	−10.96%
Margin of victory		798	12.57%	3.21%
Turnout		6,350	49.78%	−13.86%
Registered electors		13,113		35.33%
NND gain from INC		Swing	1.61%	

1977 Nagaland Legislative Assembly election: Kohima Town
Party	Candidate	Votes	%	±%
INC	John Bosco Jasokie	3,262	54.68%	
UDA	Peiezotuo Atuo	2,704	45.32%	30.25%
Margin of victory		558	9.35%	−36.66%
Turnout		5,966	63.63%	18.64%
Registered electors		9,690		0.44%
INC gain from NNO		Swing	-10.80%	

1974 Nagaland Legislative Assembly election: Kohima Town
Party	Candidate	Votes	%	±%
NNO	John Bosco Jasokie	2,776	65.47%	0.09%
Independent	Lhoukruo	825	19.46%	
UDA	Nguro Hiezao Angami	639	15.07%	
Margin of victory		1,951	46.01%	2.95%
Turnout		4,240	44.99%	−10.55%
Registered electors		9,648		55.36%
NNO hold		Swing	0.09%	

1969 Nagaland Legislative Assembly election: Kohima Town
Party	Candidate	Votes	%	±%
NNO	John Bosco Jasokie	2,253	65.38%	
Independent	Khyomo Lotha	769	22.32%	
UDF	Hariprasad Rai	424	12.30%	
Margin of victory		1,484	43.06%	
Turnout		3,446	55.54%	0.27%
Registered electors		6,210		27.73%
NNO gain from Independent		Swing	-16.59%	

1964 Nagaland Legislative Assembly election: Kohima Town
Party	Candidate	Votes	%	±%
Independent	John Bosco Jasokie	2,182	81.97%	
Independent	Silie Haralu	442	16.60%	
Independent	Shyamlal Munshi	38	1.43%	
Margin of victory		1,740	65.36%	
Turnout		2,662	55.27%	
Registered electors		4,862		
Independent win (new seat)				
