= Impur Assembly constituency =

Legislative Assembly constituency in Nagaland State, India

Coordinates: 26.39°N 94.54°E

Impur
- Constituency No. 23 for the Nagaland Legislative Assembly

Constituency details
- Country: India
- Region: Northeast India
- State: Nagaland
- District: Mokokchung
- Lok Sabha constituency: Nagaland
- Established: 1964
- Total electors: 13,737
- Reservation: ST

Member of Legislative Assembly
- 14th Nagaland Legislative Assembly
- Incumbent T. M. Mannen
- Party: NPF
- Alliance: NDA
- Elected year: 2023

Impur is one of the 60 Legislative Assembly constituencies of Nagaland state in India.

It is part of Mokokchung district and is reserved for candidates belonging to the Scheduled Tribes.

== Members of the Legislative Assembly ==
Year	Member	Party
1964	P. Shilu Ao	Independent politician
1969	Koramoa Jamir	Nagaland Nationalist Organisation
1974	Koramoa Jamir	Nagaland Nationalist Organisation
1977	Kariba	United Democratic Alliance
1982	Kariba	Indian National Congress
1987	T. Chuba	Independent politician
1989	T. Chuba	Indian National Congress
1993	T. Yupangnenba	Indian National Congress
1998	T. Chuba	Indian National Congress
2003	Nungsangyapang	Indian National Congress
2008	Nungsangyapang	Indian National Congress
2013	Dr. Imtiwapang Aier	Indian National Congress
2018	Dr. Imtiwapang Aier	Naga People's Front
2023	T. N. Mannen	Nationalist Democratic Progressive Party

== Election results ==
=== 2023 Assembly election ===
2023 Nagaland Legislative Assembly election: Impur
Party	Candidate	Votes	%	±%
NDPP	T. M. Mannen	6,825	54.23%	4.69%
INC	Bendangkokba	5,730	45.53%	
NOTA	Nota	31	0.25%	
Margin of victory		1,095	8.70%	8.06%
Turnout		12,586	91.62%	−3.38%
Registered electors		13,737		34.97%
NDPP gain from NPF		Swing	4.05%	

=== 2018 Assembly election ===
2018 Nagaland Legislative Assembly election: Impur
Party	Candidate	Votes	%	±%
NPF	Dr. Imtiwapang Aier	4,852	50.18%	13.20%
NDPP	T. N. Mannen	4,790	49.54%	
NOTA	None of the Above	27	0.28%	
Margin of victory		62	0.64%	−25.32%
Turnout		9,669	95.00%	−0.94%
Registered electors		10,178		0.39%
NPF gain from INC		Swing	-12.76%	

=== 2013 Assembly election ===
2013 Nagaland Legislative Assembly election: Impur
Party	Candidate	Votes	%	±%
INC	Dr. Imtiwapang Aier	6,122	62.94%	1.46%
NPF	T. N. Mannen	3,597	36.98%	35.01%
Margin of victory		2,525	25.96%	1.13%
Turnout		9,726	95.94%	3.33%
Registered electors		10,138		−44.35%
INC hold		Swing	1.46%	

=== 2008 Assembly election ===
2008 Nagaland Legislative Assembly election: Impur
Party	Candidate	Votes	%	±%
INC	Nungsangyapang	10,373	61.49%	3.43%
RJD	T. N. Mannen	6,184	36.66%	
NPF	Akang	333	1.97%	−39.97%
Margin of victory		4,189	24.83%	8.71%
Turnout		16,870	92.72%	−5.35%
Registered electors		18,217		36.35%
INC hold		Swing	3.43%	

=== 2003 Assembly election ===
2003 Nagaland Legislative Assembly election: Impur
Party	Candidate	Votes	%	±%
INC	Nungsangyapang	7,597	58.06%	
NPF	T. Yubangnenba	5,488	41.94%	
Margin of victory		2,109	16.12%	
Turnout		13,085	97.96%	−1.45%
Registered electors		13,360		17.23%
INC hold		Swing	23.96%	

=== 1998 Assembly election ===
1998 Nagaland Legislative Assembly election: Impur
Party	Candidate	Votes	%	±%
INC	T. Chuba	Unopposed		
Registered electors		11,396		23.15%
INC hold		Swing		

=== 1993 Assembly election ===
1993 Nagaland Legislative Assembly election: Impur
Party	Candidate	Votes	%	±%
INC	T. Yupangnenba	3,133	34.10%	−8.77%
Independent	Temjentemsu	3,112	33.87%	
NPF	Nungsangyapang	2,942	32.02%	13.60%
Margin of victory		21	0.23%	−3.95%
Turnout		9,187	99.41%	1.12%
Registered electors		9,254		−5.96%
INC hold		Swing	-8.77%	

=== 1989 Assembly election ===
1989 Nagaland Legislative Assembly election: Impur
Party	Candidate	Votes	%	±%
INC	T. Chuba	4,135	42.88%	4.90%
Independent	N. Yabang Aier	3,732	38.70%	
NPF	M. Kariba Ao	1,777	18.43%	
Margin of victory		403	4.18%	−3.05%
Turnout		9,644	98.28%	−1.11%
Registered electors		9,841		3.39%
INC gain from Independent		Swing	-2.33%	

=== 1987 Assembly election ===
1987 Nagaland Legislative Assembly election: Impur
Party	Candidate	Votes	%	±%
Independent	T. Chuba	4,246	45.20%	
INC	S. Lima Aier	3,567	37.98%	−1.48%
NPP	M. Kariba Ao	1,385	14.75%	
NND	Supongtsungba	195	2.08%	−36.66%
Margin of victory		679	7.23%	6.51%
Turnout		9,393	99.39%	10.93%
Registered electors		9,518		−16.57%
Independent gain from INC		Swing	5.75%	

=== 1982 Assembly election ===
1982 Nagaland Legislative Assembly election: Impur
Party	Candidate	Votes	%	±%
INC	Kariba	3,944	39.45%	10.15%
NND	T. Chuba	3,872	38.73%	
Independent	Koramoa Jamir	2,181	21.82%	
Margin of victory		72	0.72%	−1.43%
Turnout		9,997	88.47%	−7.14%
Registered electors		11,409		113.37%
INC gain from UDA		Swing	3.03%	

=== 1977 Assembly election ===
1977 Nagaland Legislative Assembly election: Impur
Party	Candidate	Votes	%	±%
UDA	Kariba	1,850	36.42%	11.36%
Independent	T. Chuba	1,741	34.28%	
INC	Yajen Aier	1,488	29.30%	
Margin of victory		109	2.15%	−10.94%
Turnout		5,079	95.61%	17.20%
Registered electors		5,347		−46.87%
UDA gain from NNO		Swing	-1.72%	

=== 1974 Assembly election ===
1974 Nagaland Legislative Assembly election: Impur
Party	Candidate	Votes	%	±%
NNO	Koramoa Jamir	2,962	38.15%	−13.74%
UDA	Karha	1,946	25.06%	
Independent	Chuba	1,656	21.33%	
Independent	Shilukaba	1,201	15.47%	
Margin of victory		1,016	13.08%	9.32%
Turnout		7,765	78.41%	−10.34%
Registered electors		10,064		107.46%
NNO hold		Swing	-13.74%	

=== 1969 Assembly election ===
1969 Nagaland Legislative Assembly election: Impur
Party	Candidate	Votes	%	±%
NNO	Koramoa Jamir	2,231	51.88%	
Independent	Shilokaba	2,069	48.12%	
Margin of victory		162	3.77%	
Turnout		4,300	88.74%	88.74%
Registered electors		4,851		61.75%
NNO gain from Independent		Swing		

=== 1964 Assembly election ===
1964 Nagaland Legislative Assembly election: Impur
Party	Candidate	Votes	%	±%
Independent	P. Shilu Ao	Unopposed		
Registered electors		2,999		
Independent win (new seat)				

== See also ==
- List of constituencies of the Nagaland Legislative Assembly
- Mokokchung district
