= Western Angami Assembly constituency =

Legislative Assembly constituency in Nagaland State, India

Coordinates: 25.71°N 94.04°E

Western Angami
- Constituency No. 8 for the Nagaland Legislative Assembly

Constituency details
- Country: India
- Region: Northeast India
- State: Nagaland
- District: Kohima
- Lok Sabha constituency: Nagaland
- Established: 1964
- Total electors: 17,594
- Reservation: ST

Member of Legislative Assembly
- 14th Nagaland Legislative Assembly
- Incumbent Salhoutuonuo Kruse
- Party: NPF
- Alliance: NDA
- Elected year: 2023

Western Angami is one of the 60 Legislative Assembly constituencies of Nagaland state in India.

It is part of Kohima district and is reserved for candidates belonging to the Scheduled Tribes.

== Members of the Legislative Assembly ==
Year	Member	Party
1964	Kevichusa	Independent politician
1969	Thepfulo Nakhro	Nagaland Nationalist Organisation
1974	T. N. Angami	United Democratic Alliance
1977	Setu	Independent politician
1982	Setu Lietise	Naga National Democratic Party
1987	Shurhiu	Naga National Democratic Party
1989	N. T. Nakhro	Naga People's Front
1993	Shurhiu	Naga People's Front
1998	Asu Keyho	Independent politician
2003	Kiyanilie Peseyie	Naga People's Front
2008	Kiyanilie Peseyie	Naga People's Front
2013	Kiyanilie Peseyie	Naga People's Front
2018	Keneizhakho Nakhro	Naga People's Front
2023	Salhoutuonuo Kruse	Nationalist Democratic Progressive Party

== Election results ==
Vote share of winning candidates
2023	49.74%
2018	46.75%
2013	44.17%
2008	40.78%
2003	40.24%
1998	57.66%
1993	36.06%
1989	54.25%
1987	43.57%
1982	27.06%
1977	37.51%
1974	54.79%
1969	67.40%
1964	34.13%

=== Assembly Election 2023 ===
2023 Nagaland Legislative Assembly election: Western Angami
Party	Candidate	Votes	%	±%
NDPP	Salhoutuonuo Kruse	7,078	49.74%	7.97%
Independent	Keneizhakho Nakhro	7,071	49.69%	
NOTA	Nota	80	0.56%	
Margin of victory		7	0.05%	−4.93%
Turnout		14,229	80.87%	−1.55%
Registered electors		17,594		4.05%
NDPP gain from NPF		Swing	2.99%	

=== Assembly Election 2018 ===
2018 Nagaland Legislative Assembly election: Western Angami
Party	Candidate	Votes	%	±%
NPF	Keneizhakho Nakhro	6,516	46.75%	2.58%
NDPP	Er.Kevisekho Kruse	5,822	41.77%	
NPP	Asu Keyho	1,500	10.76%	
NOTA	None of the Above	99	0.71%	
Margin of victory		694	4.98%	−2.42%
Turnout		13,937	82.42%	−0.57%
Registered electors		16,909		3.84%
NPF hold		Swing	2.58%	

=== Assembly Election 2013 ===
2013 Nagaland Legislative Assembly election: Western Angami
Party	Candidate	Votes	%	±%
NPF	Kiyanilie Peseyie	5,969	44.17%	3.39%
INC	Asu Keyho	4,969	36.77%	5.27%
Independent	Huzo Meru	2,569	19.01%	
Margin of victory		1,000	7.40%	−1.88%
Turnout		13,514	82.99%	6.57%
Registered electors		16,283		−19.24%
NPF hold		Swing	3.39%	

=== Assembly Election 2008 ===
2008 Nagaland Legislative Assembly election: Western Angami
Party	Candidate	Votes	%	±%
NPF	Kiyanilie Peseyie	6,284	40.78%	0.55%
INC	Achubu	4,854	31.50%	−1.25%
Independent	Asu Keyho	3,990	25.90%	
LJP	Kelhuzhato Nakhro	343	2.23%	
Margin of victory		1,430	9.28%	1.79%
Turnout		15,408	76.73%	3.55%
Registered electors		20,162		13.77%
NPF hold		Swing	0.55%	

=== Assembly Election 2003 ===
2003 Nagaland Legislative Assembly election: Western Angami
Party	Candidate	Votes	%	±%
NPF	Kiyanilie Peseyie	5,192	40.24%	
INC	Asu Keyho	4,226	32.75%	−9.59%
Independent	Dr. Ruungutuo	2,637	20.44%	
BJP	Vikehielie	848	6.57%	
Margin of victory		966	7.49%	−7.84%
Turnout		12,903	72.87%	−1.94%
Registered electors		17,721		14.26%
NPF gain from Independent		Swing	4.18%	

=== Assembly Election 1998 ===
1998 Nagaland Legislative Assembly election: Western Angami
Party	Candidate	Votes	%	±%
Independent	Asu Keyho	5,562	57.66%	
INC	N. T. Nakhro	4,084	42.34%	11.80%
Margin of victory		1,478	15.32%	12.66%
Turnout		9,646	64.07%	−10.75%
Registered electors		15,509		28.31%
Independent gain from NPF		Swing	21.60%	

=== Assembly Election 1993 ===
1993 Nagaland Legislative Assembly election: Western Angami
Party	Candidate	Votes	%	±%
NPF	Shurhiu	3,215	36.06%	−18.19%
Independent	Asu Keyho	2,978	33.40%	
INC	Setu Ligise	2,723	30.54%	−15.21%
Margin of victory		237	2.66%	−5.84%
Turnout		8,916	74.82%	1.25%
Registered electors		12,087		35.31%
NPF hold		Swing	-18.19%	

=== Assembly Election 1989 ===
1989 Nagaland Legislative Assembly election: Western Angami
Party	Candidate	Votes	%	±%
NPF	N. T. Nakhro	3,499	54.25%	
INC	Crellan Peseyie	2,951	45.75%	12.82%
Margin of victory		548	8.50%	−2.14%
Turnout		6,450	73.57%	0.29%
Registered electors		8,933		0.12%
NPF gain from NND		Swing	10.68%	

=== Assembly Election 1987 ===
1987 Nagaland Legislative Assembly election: Western Angami
Party	Candidate	Votes	%	±%
NND	Shurhiu	2,811	43.57%	16.51%
INC	Vibikho	2,125	32.94%	16.79%
NPP	Mhiosizokho Zinyu	1,516	23.50%	
Margin of victory		686	10.63%	0.28%
Turnout		6,452	73.28%	12.83%
Registered electors		8,922		−18.77%
NND hold		Swing	16.51%	

=== Assembly Election 1982 ===
1982 Nagaland Legislative Assembly election: Western Angami
Party	Candidate	Votes	%	±%
NND	Setu Lietise	1,780	27.06%	
Independent	N. T. Nakhro	1,099	16.71%	
INC	C. K. Nakhro	1,062	16.14%	
Independent	Mhiosizokho Zinyu	973	14.79%	
Independent	Dolhoukhou	938	14.26%	
Independent	Rano M. Shziaz	637	9.68%	
Independent	Ropfkhrieto	89	1.35%	
Margin of victory		681	10.35%	8.99%
Turnout		6,578	60.45%	−9.64%
Registered electors		10,984		46.47%
NND gain from Independent		Swing	-10.45%	

=== Assembly Election 1977 ===
1977 Nagaland Legislative Assembly election: Western Angami
Party	Candidate	Votes	%	±%
Independent	Setu	1,926	37.51%	
UDA	Tsolie	1,856	36.15%	−18.64%
NCN	Ngutsonyu Angami	1,051	20.47%	
Independent	Kouhie	301	5.86%	
Margin of victory		70	1.36%	−13.52%
Turnout		5,134	70.09%	5.55%
Registered electors		7,499		13.64%
Independent gain from UDA		Swing	-17.27%	

=== Assembly Election 1974 ===
1974 Nagaland Legislative Assembly election: Western Angami
Party	Candidate	Votes	%	±%
UDA	T. N. Angami	2,294	54.79%	
NNO	S. Liegise	1,671	39.91%	−27.49%
Independent	Kuovitha	222	5.30%	
Margin of victory		623	14.88%	−19.92%
Turnout		4,187	64.54%	−3.70%
Registered electors		6,599		57.01%
UDA gain from NNO		Swing	-12.61%	

=== Assembly Election 1969 ===
1969 Nagaland Legislative Assembly election: Western Angami
Party	Candidate	Votes	%	±%
NNO	Thepfulo Nakhro	1,933	67.40%	
UDF	Ravole U	935	32.60%	
Margin of victory		998	34.80%	
Turnout		2,868	68.24%	−2.48%
Registered electors		4,203		11.49%
NNO gain from Independent		Swing	33.27%	

=== Assembly Election 1964 ===
1964 Nagaland Legislative Assembly election: Western Angami
Party	Candidate	Votes	%	±%
Independent	Kevichusa	910	34.13%	
Margin of victory				
Turnout		2,666	70.72%	
Registered electors		3,770		
Independent win (new seat)				

== See also ==
- List of constituencies of the Nagaland Legislative Assembly
- Kohima district
