= 1977 Nagaland Legislative Assembly election =

Legislative Assembly election in Nagaland, India

← 1974	18 November 1977	1982 →

All 60 seats in the Nagaland Legislative Assembly 31 seats needed for a majority
- Registered: 403,454
	Majority party	Minority party
	UDA	INC
Leader	Vizol Koso
Party	UDA	INC
Leader's seat	Southern Angami-II
Seats before	25
Seats won	35	15
Seat change	New	New
Popular vote	39.21%	20.19%
CM before election
President's rule
Elected CM
Vizol Koso
United Democratic Front (Nagaland)

Elections to the Nagaland Legislative Assembly were held in November 1977 to elect members of the 60 constituencies in Nagaland, India. United Democratic Front won the majority of seats and Vizol Koso was appointed as the Chief Minister of Nagaland for his second term. The number of constituencies was set as 60 by the recommendation of the Delimitation Commission of India.

These were the first elections held in Nagaland after the Shillong Accord of 1975.

== Result ==
Party	Votes	%	Seats	+/–
United Democratic Front	127,445	39.21	35	▲10
Indian National Congress	65,616	20.19	15	New
National Convention of Nagaland	38,528	11.85	1	New
Independents	93,405	28.74	9	▼3
Total	324,994	100.00	60	0
Valid votes	324,994	98.07		
Invalid/blank votes	6,407	1.93		
Total votes	331,401	100.00		
Registered voters/turnout	403,454	82.14		
Source: ECI

=== Results by constituency ===
Winner, runner-up, voter turnout, and victory margin in every constituency
Assembly Constituency		Turnout	Winner				Runner Up				Margin
#k	Names	%	Candidate	Party	Votes	%	Candidate	Party	Votes	%	Margin
1	Dimapur I	60.33%	Md. Anwar Hussain	INC	2,421	38.75%	Chalie Kevichusa	UDA	1,939	31.03%	482
2	Dimapur II	61.86%	I. Vikheshe	INC	3,406	45.90%	Neisatuo Kiditsu	UDA	2,814	37.92%	592
3	Dimapur III	87.87%	Dabalal Mech	INC	1,807	40.18%	Satish Langtha	Independent	1,358	30.20%	449
4	Ghaspani I	66.25%	K. Shikhu	Independent	2,928	36.20%	Lhouvisier	UDA	2,680	33.14%	248
5	Ghaspani II	79.53%	Rokonicha	UDA	2,245	30.47%	Langkam	Independent	2,017	27.38%	228
6	Tening	89.82%	N. C. Zeling	INC	2,224	31.33%	N. Azu Mewmai	UDA	2,207	31.09%	17
7	Peren	78.58%	L. Lungalang	UDA	3,524	46.80%	Imriet Dieing	Independent	2,004	26.61%	1,520
8	Western Angami	70.09%	Setu	Independent	1,926	36.64%	Tsolie	UDA	1,856	35.31%	70
9	Kohima Town	63.63%	John Bosco Jasokie	INC	3,262	52.90%	Peiezotuo Atuo	UDA	2,704	43.85%	558
10	Northern Angami I	69.03%	Dr. Shürhozelie Liezietsu	UDA	2,446	62.08%	Neiteo	Independent	953	24.19%	1,493
11	Northern Angami II	75.66%	Chupfuo	UDA	2,589	41.39%	P. Sopu Angami	Independent	1,867	29.85%	722
12	Tseminyü	82.64%	R. S. Rengma	UDA	2,888	52.59%	Riga Thong	NCN	2,494	45.41%	394
13	Pughoboto	87.83%	Huska Sumi	UDA	3,218	56.74%	Atovi Sema	Independent	2,326	41.02%	892
14	Southern Angami I	75.74%	Vitsonei K. Angami	UDA	1,885	41.14%	N. Zao Angami	Independent	1,140	24.88%	745
15	Southern Angami II	-	Vizol Koso	UDA	Elected Unopposed						
16	Pfütsero	80.65%	Lhiweshelo Mero	UDA	1,568	38.54%	Vepari	NCN	841	20.67%	727
17	Chizami	93.71%	Soyie	UDA	1,831	32.94%	Yevehu Lohe	Independent	1,739	31.28%	92
18	Chozuba	91.03%	Vamuzo Phesao	UDA	3,233	47.22%	Zhovepra Rosetso	Independent	1,854	27.08%	1,379
19	Phek	85.87%	Vejoyi	UDA	2,584	47.66%	Zalhuzu Vasa	Independent	1,651	30.45%	933
20	Meluri	90.43%	Chekhutso	UDA	1,794	33.85%	P. K. T. Marhutho	Independent	1,558	29.40%	236
21	Tuli	93.37%	T. Tali	UDA	2,845	62.97%	I. Merachiba	INC	1,496	33.11%	1,349
22	Arkakong	92.36%	Tsukjemwati	UDA	1,806	35.31%	R. C. Chiten Jamir	INC	1,150	22.48%	656
23	Impur	95.61%	Kariba	UDA	1,850	36.19%	T. Chuba	Independent	1,741	34.06%	109
24	Angetyongpang	87.71%	Sentichuba	UDA	2,783	57.11%	Limasangwa	Independent	2,017	41.39%	766
25	Mongoya	85.19%	T. Imtimeren Jamir	UDA	2,275	54.01%	Aoshingang	Independent	1,894	44.97%	381
26	Aonglenden	83.06%	S. C. Jamir	UDA	2,688	61.89%	I. Bendang	NCN	1,586	36.52%	1,102
27	Mokokchung Town	84.27%	Takuyaba	UDA	827	69.85%	Koramoa Jamir	Independent	345	29.14%	482
28	Koridang	83.43%	Dalle Namo	UDA	2,102	42.43%	Akangtemjan	Independent	1,808	36.50%	294
29	Jangpetkong	93.01%	Imchalemba Ao	UDA	2,044	40.98%	Arienba	Independent	1,735	34.78%	309
30	Alongtaki	91.21%	Bendangtoshi Ao	UDA	2,156	54.99%	Tiameren	INC	1,716	43.76%	440
31	Akuluto	89.28%	Khehoto	INC	1,774	43.76%	Hotolu	UDA	1,296	31.97%	478
32	Atoizu	85.18%	Kiyezhe L. Chishi	UDA	2,993	54.42%	Khetoho	INC	2,419	43.98%	574
33	Suruhoto	87.18%	Kanito	INC	2,584	41.09%	Pukhahe	UDA	2,126	33.81%	458
34	Aghunato	88.43%	Kihoto	UDA	3,509	57.17%	Shetovi	NCN	1,752	28.54%	1,757
35	Zünheboto	80.85%	Ghutoshe	INC	2,514	46.15%	Tokheho	NCN	1,633	29.97%	881
36	Satakha	86.06%	Kaito	INC	2,824	49.12%	Hokheto Sema	UDA	2,811	48.90%	13
37	Tyüi	85.45%	T. A. Ngullie	INC	2,304	35.73%	Nsemo Ovung	UDA	2,170	33.65%	134
38	Wokha	79.13%	Rainbow Ezung	Independent	3,199	52.62%	Mhao Lotha	UDA	2,742	45.10%	457
39	Sanis	84.46%	Mhonshan Murry	UDA	2,434	38.75%	T. Nchibemo Ngullie	Independent	2,282	36.33%	152
40	Bhandari	86.66%	Tsenlamo Kikon	NCN	2,951	49.41%	Mhondamo Kithan	INC	2,150	36.00%	801
41	Tizit	86.32%	P. K. Along	UDA	1,632	35.59%	Mankho	INC	1,416	30.88%	216
42	Wakching	86.88%	Chingwang Konyak	INC	2,397	38.08%	P. Enyei	UDA	2,240	35.58%	157
43	Tapi	82.77%	Noke Wangnao	UDA	2,600	49.21%	Hoka Konyak	INC	1,035	19.59%	1,565
44	Phomching	87.05%	Pohwang Konyak	UDA	2,170	43.97%	Wanpen	INC	1,732	35.10%	438
45	Tehok	91.78%	Manlem	Independent	1,782	27.87%	Noklem	Independent	1,578	24.68%	204
46	Mon Town	77.27%	L. Metna	Independent	2,386	40.85%	Chaying	INC	1,245	21.31%	1,141
47	Aboi	86.67%	A. Longngei Konyak	UDA	2,573	48.62%	Nyeiwang Konyak	NCN	1,838	34.73%	735
48	Moka	89.45%	Manwai Awang	Independent	2,304	46.24%	Pangtiang	UDA	1,605	32.21%	699
49	Tamlu	94.51%	Bangjak Phom	Independent	3,441	50.99%	Ailong Phom	UDA	1,733	25.68%	1,708
50	Longleng	93.00%	Chenlom Phom	UDA	2,213	25.08%	Chirgko	INC	1,947	22.06%	266
51	Noksen	92.84%	C. Chongshen Chang	INC	1,918	45.51%	I. L. Chingmak	Independent	1,336	31.70%	582
52	Longkhim Chare	90.97%	Horangse Sangtam	Independent	2,843	39.24%	C. Thrinimong	UDA	2,541	35.07%	302
53	Tuensang Sadar I	78.88%	H. Sao Chang	INC	1,914	42.18%	Chiten Sangtam	UDA	1,549	34.13%	365
54	Tuensang Sadar II	89.06%	Tochi Hanso	INC	1,773	35.03%	M. Yanchu Chang	Independent	1,743	34.43%	30
55	Tobu	92.11%	Nuklo	UDA	2,947	47.60%	Sopen Konyak	NCN	2,078	33.56%	869
56	Noklak	81.52%	Thangpong	UDA	1,652	32.22%	John	INC	1,273	24.83%	379
57	Thonoknyu	89.95%	Pongom	INC	1,982	31.09%	Pottu	Independent	1,284	20.14%	698
58	Shamator–Chessore	90.71%	K. Zungkum Yimchunger	UDA	2,863	42.25%	Yamakan Kichan	INC	2,655	39.18%	208
59	Seyochung–Sitimi	87.04%	Yopikyu Thongtsar	UDA	3,236	47.78%	Kheshito	Independent	1,944	28.71%	1,292
60	Pungro–Kiphire	81.27%	Kichingse	Independent	1,620	27.33%	T. Rothrong	INC	1,542	26.02%	78

== See also ==
- List of constituencies of the Nagaland Legislative Assembly
- 1977 elections in India
