= Akuluto Assembly constituency =

Legislative Assembly constituency in Nagaland State, India

Coordinates: 26.17°N 94.49°E

Akuluto
- Constituency No. 31 for the Nagaland Legislative Assembly

Constituency details
- Country: India
- Region: Northeast India
- State: Nagaland
- District: Zünheboto
- Lok Sabha constituency: Nagaland
- Established: 1964
- Total electors: 10,725
- Reservation: ST

Member of Legislative Assembly
- 14th Nagaland Legislative Assembly
- Incumbent Kazheto Kinimi
- Party: Bharatiya Janata Party
- Elected year: 2023

Akuluto is one of the 60 Legislative Assembly constituencies of Nagaland state in India.

It is part of Zünheboto district and is reserved for candidates belonging to the Scheduled Tribes.

== Members of the Legislative Assembly ==
Year	Member	Party
1964	Hokishe Sema	Independent
1969	Hokishe Sema	Nagaland Nationalist Organisation
1974	Hokishe Sema	Nagaland Nationalist Organisation
1977	I. Khehoto Sema	Indian National Congress
1982	I. Khehoto Sema	Indian National Congress
1987	I. Khehoto Sema	Indian National Congress
1989	I. Khehoto Sema	Indian National Congress
1993	Kakheto	Independent
1998	Kakheto	Indian National Congress
2003	Kheto	Naga People's Front
2008	Kheto	Naga People's Front
2013	Khekaho	Indian National Congress
2018	Kazheto Kinim	Bharatiya Janata Party
2023	Kazheto Kinim	Bharatiya Janata Party

== Election results ==
=== 2023 Assembly election ===
2023 Nagaland Legislative Assembly election: Akuluto
Party	Candidate	Votes	%	±%
BJP	Kazheto Kinimi	Unopposed		
Registered electors		10,725		7.10%
BJP hold		Swing		

=== 2018 Assembly election ===
2018 Nagaland Legislative Assembly election: Akuluto
Party	Candidate	Votes	%	±%
BJP	Kazheto Kinimi	4,844	54.01%	
NPF	K. Khekaho Assumi	4,109	45.82%	5.60%
NOTA	None of the Above	15	0.17%	
Margin of victory		735	8.20%	−11.32%
Turnout		8,968	89.55%	−5.19%
Registered electors		10,014		−6.64%
BJP gain from INC		Swing	-5.72%	

=== 2013 Assembly election ===
2013 Nagaland Legislative Assembly election: Akuluto
Party	Candidate	Votes	%	±%
INC	Khekaho	6,070	59.73%	−5.66%
NPF	Kazheto Kinimi	4,087	40.22%	4.44%
Margin of victory		1,983	19.51%	−10.10%
Turnout		10,162	94.74%	−0.65%
Registered electors		10,726		−5.77%
INC hold		Swing	-5.66%	

=== 2008 Assembly election ===
2008 Nagaland Legislative Assembly election: Akuluto
Party	Candidate	Votes	%	±%
INC	Kheto	7,100	65.39%	19.82%
NPF	Khetoho	3,885	35.78%	−18.65%
Margin of victory		3,215	29.61%	20.75%
Turnout		10,858	96.50%	16.48%
Registered electors		11,383		47.35%
INC gain from NPF		Swing	10.96%	

=== 2003 Assembly election ===
2003 Nagaland Legislative Assembly election: Akuluto
Party	Candidate	Votes	%	±%
NPF	Khetoho	3,318	54.43%	
INC	Kazheto Kinimi	2,778	45.57%	
Margin of victory		540	8.86%	
Turnout		6,096	78.91%	78.91%
Registered electors		7,725		12.15%
NPF gain from INC		Swing	7.72%	

=== 1998 Assembly election ===
1998 Nagaland Legislative Assembly election: Akuluto
Party	Candidate	Votes	%	±%
INC	Kazheto Kinimi	Unopposed		
Registered electors		6,888		12.29%
INC gain from Independent		Swing		

=== 1993 Assembly election ===
1993 Nagaland Legislative Assembly election: Akuluto
Party	Candidate	Votes	%	±%
Independent	Kazheto Kinimi	2,637	46.71%	
INC	Khehoto	2,108	37.34%	−13.99%
NPF	Vitokhe	900	15.94%	−32.72%
Margin of victory		529	9.37%	6.70%
Turnout		5,645	92.73%	3.19%
Registered electors		6,134		39.25%
Independent gain from INC		Swing	-4.62%	

=== 1989 Assembly election ===
1989 Nagaland Legislative Assembly election: Akuluto
Party	Candidate	Votes	%	±%
INC	I. Khehoto Sema	2,017	51.34%	10.46%
NPF	I. Vitokhe Sema	1,912	48.66%	
Margin of victory		105	2.67%	−2.03%
Turnout		3,929	89.53%	−3.52%
Registered electors		4,405		0.00%
INC hold		Swing	10.46%	

=== 1987 Assembly election ===
1987 Nagaland Legislative Assembly election: Akuluto
Party	Candidate	Votes	%	±%
INC	I. Khehoto Sema	1,644	40.88%	4.47%
NND	I. Vitokhe Sema	1,455	36.18%	14.85%
NPP	Kanito	923	22.95%	
Margin of victory		189	4.70%	−9.11%
Turnout		4,022	93.05%	6.57%
Registered electors		4,405		−26.56%
INC hold		Swing	4.47%	

=== 1982 Assembly election ===
1982 Nagaland Legislative Assembly election: Akuluto
Party	Candidate	Votes	%	±%
INC	Khehoto	1,861	36.40%	−8.03%
Independent	I. Vitokhe Sema	1,155	22.59%	
NND	Hotolu	1,090	21.32%	
Independent	Kanito	1,006	19.68%	
Margin of victory		706	13.81%	1.84%
Turnout		5,112	86.48%	−2.80%
Registered electors		5,998		32.09%
INC hold		Swing	-8.03%	

=== 1977 Assembly election ===
1977 Nagaland Legislative Assembly election: Akuluto
Party	Candidate	Votes	%	±%
INC	Khehoto	1,774	44.44%	
UDA	Hotolu	1,296	32.46%	
NCN	Kazheto Kinimi	922	23.10%	
Margin of victory		478	11.97%	
Turnout		3,992	89.28%	89.28%
Registered electors		4,541		−9.87%
INC gain from NNO		Swing		

=== 1974 Assembly election ===
1974 Nagaland Legislative Assembly election: Akuluto
Party	Candidate	Votes	%	±%
NNO	Hokishe Sema	Unopposed		
Registered electors		5,038		19.07%
NNO hold		Swing		

=== 1969 Assembly election ===
1969 Nagaland Legislative Assembly election: Akuluto
Party	Candidate	Votes	%	±%
NNO	Hokishe Sema	1,647	47.15%	
Independent	I. Khehoto Sema	1,059	30.32%	
UDF	I. Vitokhe Sema	787	22.53%	
Margin of victory		588	16.83%	
Turnout		3,493	82.68%	82.68%
Registered electors		4,231		60.20%
NNO gain from Independent		Swing		

=== 1964 Assembly election ===
1964 Nagaland Legislative Assembly election: Akuluto
Party	Candidate	Votes	%	±%
Independent	Hokishe Sema	Unopposed		
Registered electors		2,641		
Independent win (new seat)				

== See also ==
- List of constituencies of the Nagaland Legislative Assembly
- Zunheboto district
