= 1974 Nagaland Legislative Assembly election =

Legislative Assembly election in Nagaland, India

- 12–16 February 1974

All 60 seats in the Nagaland Legislative Assembly 31 seats needed for a majority
- Registered: 400,322
	Majority party	Minority party
	UDA	NNO
Leader	Vizol Koso	Hokishe Sema
Party	UDA	NNO
Leader's seat	Southern Angami-II	Akuluto
Seats before	10	22
Seats won	25	23
Seat change	New	▲1
Popular vote	30.01%	35.71%
CM before election
Hokishe Sema
NNO
Elected CM
Vizol Koso
UDA

Elections to the Nagaland Legislative Assembly were held in February 1974 to elect members of the 60 constituencies in Nagaland, India. United Democratic Front won the most number of seats and Vizol Koso was appointed as the Chief Minister of Nagaland.

After the previous election in 1969, the number of constituencies in Nagaland were increased from 40 to 60, following the recommendation of the Delimitation Commission of India.

== Results ==
The election results were released on 20 February.

Party	Votes	%	Seats	+/–
Nagaland Nationalist Organisation	103,515	35.71	23	▲1
United Democratic Alliance (Nagaland)	87,005	30.01	25	New
Independents	99,379	34.28	12	▲4
Total	289,899	100.00	60	▲20
Valid votes	289,899	97.40		
Invalid/blank votes	7,731	2.60		
Total votes	297,630	100.00		
Registered voters/turnout	400,322	74.35		
Source: ECI

=== Results by constituency ===
Winner, runner-up, voter turnout, and victory margin in every constituency
Assembly Constituency		Turnout	Winner				Runner Up				Margin
#k	Names	%	Candidate	Party	Votes	%	Candidate	Party	Votes	%	Margin
1	Dimapur I	49.43%	Mhaile Peseyie	NNO	3,603	62.93%	Gobinda Ch. Paira	UDA	1,940	33.89%	1,663
2	Dimapur II	49.46%	Lhomithi Sema	NNO	3,689	55.52%	Neisatuo Kiditsu	UDA	2,166	32.60%	1,523
3	Dimapur III	83.62%	Dabalal Mech	NNO	1,780	50.23%	Sompurno Kachari	Independent	1,300	36.68%	480
4	Ghaspani I	61.13%	Lhouvisier	Independent	995	17.58%	Niza Naleo	UDA	988	17.46%	7
5	Ghaspani II	76.97%	Rokonicha	UDA	1,815	36.43%	Langkam	NNO	1,715	34.42%	100
6	Tening	86.81%	N. Azu Newmai	UDA	1,730	30.28%	Jangkhosei Hangsingh	Independent	1,640	28.71%	90
7	Peren	73.38%	Kielu	UDA	1,712	37.40%	Longbe	Independent	1,456	31.80%	256
8	Western Angami	64.54%	T. N. Angami	UDA	2,294	53.86%	S. Liegise	NNO	1,671	39.23%	623
9	Kohima Town	44.99%	John Bosco Jasokie	NNO	2,776	63.95%	Lhoukruo	Independent	825	19.00%	1,951
10	Northern Angami I	65.02%	Shürhozelie Liezietsu	UDA	2,138	55.17%	Mezhuvilie	NNO	1,152	29.73%	986
11	Northern Angami II	78.72%	K. V. Keditsu	UDA	2,201	32.35%	Zakio Metha	NNO	1,931	28.38%	270
12	Tseminyü	84.26%	Rushulo	Independent	2,564	50.27%	Riga Thong	NNO	2,472	48.47%	92
13	Pughoboto	84.47%	Huska Sumi	Independent	2,536	49.97%	Hosheto Sema	NNO	1,544	30.42%	992
14	Southern Angami I	72.92%	Vitsonie	UDA	1,916	47.85%	Kehozhol Khieya	NNO	1,441	35.99%	475
15	Southern Angami II	75.85%	Vizol Koso	UDA	2,410	62.18%	Pusazo	NNO	934	24.10%	1,476
16	Pfütsero	72.60%	Weprenyi Kapfo	UDA	1,969	39.49%	Vepari	Independent	1,421	28.50%	548
17	Chizami	87.21%	Yevehu Lohe	UDA	1,262	22.56%	Soyie	Independent	1,241	22.19%	21
18	Chozuba	80.78%	Vamüzo Phesao	UDA	4,445	56.67%	Neitsutso Thevo	NNO	3,217	41.01%	1,228
19	Phek	80.52%	Mülhüpra Vero	NNO	2,339	40.93%	Zalhuzu Vasa	UDA	2,010	35.17%	329
20	Meluri	85.37%	Rasutho	UDA	1,250	25.63%	Marhutho	NNO	1,180	24.19%	70
21	Tuli	79.97%	Merachiba	NNO	3,198	51.23%	Pangerwati	UDA	2,967	47.53%	231
22	Arkakong	84.53%	R. C. Chiten Jamir	NNO	3,521	50.66%	Tsukjeuwati	UDA	3,374	48.55%	147
23	Impur	78.41%	Koramoa Jamir	NNO	2,962	37.54%	Karha	UDA	1,946	24.66%	1,016
24	Angetyongpang	75.61%	Sentichuba	UDA	2,213	43.25%	Limasangwa	Independent	1,562	30.53%	651
25	Mongoya	70.04%	Imtimeren	UDA	2,347	49.11%	Temjensoba	NNO	1,293	27.06%	1,054
26	Aonglenden	71.21%	Chubatoshi	UDA	2,148	45.87%	Bendamgangshi	Independent	1,416	30.24%	732
27	Mokokchung Town	46.64%	R. Lisen Ao	NNO	656	42.05%	Limatemjen	Independent	379	24.29%	277
28	Koridang	83.71%	Tajenyuba Ao	UDA	2,531	36.94%	N. Subong	NNO	1,566	22.86%	965
29	Jangpetkong	75.11%	Imchalemba Ao	Independent	2,602	36.99%	Arienba	UDA	1,559	22.16%	1,043
30	Alongtaki	82.85%	Bendangtoshi Ao	UDA	2,084	38.73%	Zulutemba Jamit	NNO	1,211	22.51%	873
31	Akuluto	-	Hokishe Sema	NNO	Elected Unopposed						
32	Atoizu	81.30%	N. Yeshito Chishi	Independent	2,185	38.43%	Kiyekhu Shikhu	NNO	2,055	36.15%	130
33	Suruhoto	78.44%	Nihovi Sema	NNO	2,757	47.84%	Choito Sema	Independent	1,679	29.13%	1,078
34	Aghunato	84.78%	Iheze Sema	NNO	3,137	60.62%	Visheto Sema	Independent	1,879	36.31%	1,258
35	Zünheboto	78.09%	Tokheho Sema	Independent	1,851	37.29%	Ghutoshe Sema	Independent	1,575	31.73%	276
36	Satakha	83.24%	Hokheto Sema	Independent	2,678	46.67%	K. Yeshiito Sema	NNO	2,155	37.56%	523
37	Tyüi	88.39%	T. A. Ngullie	NNO	1,603	31.24%	Khyomo Lotha	UDA	1,130	22.02%	473
38	Wokha	80.49%	Mhao Lotha	UDA	1,667	33.98%	N. L. Odyuo	NNO	1,203	24.52%	464
39	Sanis	87.66%	Mhonshan	Independent	1,330	25.61%	T. Nchibemo Ngullie	Independent	1,243	23.94%	87
40	Bhandari	86.57%	Mhondamo Kithan	UDA	2,434	49.62%	Tsenlamo Kikon	NNO	2,416	49.26%	18
41	Tizit	77.07%	P. Enyei Konyak	NNO	1,553	46.15%	Chingai	UDA	1,237	36.76%	316
42	Wakching	88.09%	Chingwang Konyak	NNO	2,814	60.75%	Shaopa	UDA	1,251	27.01%	1,563
43	Tapi	75.83%	Noke Wangnao	UDA	2,155	56.25%	Mankho	NNO	1,006	26.26%	1,149
44	Phomching	68.02%	Wanpen	NNO	1,421	42.52%	Powang	UDA	837	25.04%	584
45	Tehok	84.13%	Hentok	NNO	2,031	39.82%	Manlem	UDA	1,517	29.74%	514
46	Mon Town	84.18%	Tingnei Koynak	NNO	2,017	39.89%	Methana Konyak	UDA	1,502	29.71%	515
47	Aboi	85.93%	Nyeiwang Konyak	UDA	2,324	49.30%	Longneim	NNO	2,209	46.86%	115
48	Moka	65.70%	Anden	NNO	1,840	47.85%	S. Manwai	UDA	983	25.57%	857
49	Tamlu	90.78%	Wokshing	UDA	1,687	31.69%	Bangjak Phom	Independent	1,203	22.60%	484
50	Longleng	82.98%	N. Metpong Phom	Independent	1,618	25.23%	A. L. Chongko Phom	Independent	1,381	21.53%	237
51	Noksen	92.06%	I. L. Chingmak	NNO	2,416	60.04%	C. Chongshen Chang	Independent	1,535	38.15%	881
52	Longkhim Chare	86.75%	L. J. Toshi Sangtam	Independent	2,663	38.50%	Horang	NNO	2,436	35.22%	227
53	Tuensang Sadar I	46.51%	H. Sao Chang	Independent	1,229	32.10%	Chiten Sangtam	NNO	1,118	29.20%	111
54	Tuensang Sadar II	80.43%	M. Yanchu Chang	NNO	2,177	44.06%	Zutchu Loyem	Independent	1,388	28.09%	789
55	Tobu	-	Nuklo	UDA	Elected Unopposed						
56	Noklak	62.05%	Tochi Hanso	NNO	1,692	36.89%	N. Thangong	UDA	1,634	35.62%	58
57	Thonoknyu	77.14%	Mongchua Khiamungan	UDA	1,664	34.57%	M. T. Mongba	NNO	979	20.34%	685
58	Shamator–Chessore	68.54%	P. Monokiu	NNO	2,473	48.62%	K. Zungkum Yimchunger	Independent	1,189	23.38%	1,284
59	Seyochung–Sitimi	82.36%	Zhetovi	Independent	1,854	32.46%	Kichingse	NNO	1,364	23.88%	490
60	Pungro–Kiphire	82.05%	T. Rothrong	UDA	1,744	35.19%	Kechingkam	NNO	1,498	30.23%	246

== See also ==
- List of constituencies of the Nagaland Legislative Assembly
- 1974 elections in India
