= T. M. Mannen =

Indian politician and retired IAS officer

T N Mannen (born 1950) is an Indian politician from Nagaland. He is an MLA from the Impur Assembly constituency, which is reserved for Scheduled Tribes, in Mokokchung District. He won the 2023 Nagaland Legislative Assembly election, representing the Nationalist Democratic Progressive Party, which is now merged with the Naga People's Front.

== Early life and education ==
Mannen is from Impur, Mokokchung District, Nagaland. He is the son of the late Teka Ao. He completed his M.A. in 1989 at the University of East Anglia, Norwich, England. He is a retired Indian Administrative Service officer from the 1976 batch. He served as an additional chief secretary and commissioner, Nagaland and took voluntary retirement in 2007.

== Career ==
Mannen was elected from the Impur Assembly constituency representing the Nationalist Democratic Progressive Party in the 2023 Nagaland Legislative Assembly election. He polled 11,2156 votes and defeated his nearest rival, Bendangkokba of the Indian National Congress, by a margin of 1,095 votes.
