= 1969 Nagaland Legislative Assembly election =

Legislative Assembly election in Nagaland, India

- 6 February 1969

All 40 seats in the Nagaland Legislative Assembly 21 seats needed for a majority
- Registered: 176,931
- Turnout: 78.37%
	Majority party	Minority party
	NNO	UDF
Leader	Hokishe Sema
Party	NNO	UDF
Leader's seat	Impur
Seats won	22	10
Seat change	New	New
Popular vote	38.66%	21.76%
CM before election
T. N. Angami
NNO
Elected CM
Hokishe Sema
NNO

Elections to the Nagaland Legislative Assembly were held in February 1969 to elect members of the 40 constituencies in Nagaland, India. Nagaland Nationalist Organisation won a majority of the seats and Hokishe Sema was appointed as the Chief Minister of Nagaland.

Nagaland was converted to a state by the State of Nagaland Act, 1962 and the first elections were called for in 1964. The five-year term for that assembly came to an end in January 1969.

== Result ==
Party	Votes	%	Seats	+/–
Nagaland Nationalist Organisation	53,507	38.66	22	New
United Front of Nagaland	30,109	21.76	10	New
Independents	54,783	39.58	8	▼32
Total	138,399	100.00	40	0
Valid votes	138,399	99.81		
Invalid/blank votes	259	0.19		
Total votes	138,658	100.00		
Registered voters/turnout	176,931	78.37		
Source: ECI

=== Results by constituency ===
Winner, runner-up, voter turnout, and victory margin in every constituency
Assembly Constituency		Turnout	Winner				Runner Up				Margin
#k	Names	%	Candidate	Party	Votes	%	Candidate	Party	Votes	%	Margin
1	Dimapur III	57.31%	Gobinda Ch. Paira	NNO	2,672	58.89%	A. Kevichüsa	UDF	1,864	41.08%	808
2	Dimapur III	70.11%	Debalal Mech	NNO	3,186	81.86%	A. Kevichüsa	UDF	706	18.14%	2,480
3	Ghaspani II	69.28%	Langkam Kuki	NNO	1,691	41.63%	Vikhalte	Independent	923	22.72%	768
4	Tening	79.44%	N. Azu Mewmai	Independent	992	32.62%	Kaikholal	UDF	643	21.14%	349
5	Peren	79.04%	T. Haralu	UDF	1,103	36.25%	Kielu	Independent	810	26.62%	293
6	Western Angami	68.24%	T. N. Angami	NNO	1,933	67.40%	Ravole U	UDF	935	32.60%	998
7	Kohima Town	55.54%	John Bosco Jasokie	NNO	2,253	65.32%	Khyomo Lotha	Independent	769	22.30%	1,484
8	Northern Angami I	72.48%	Dr. Shürhozelie Liezietsu	UDF	1,738	56.69%	Mezhuvilie	NNO	724	23.61%	1,014
9	Northern Angami II	79.52%	K. V. Keditsu	NNO	1,115	29.51%	Lho-Usao	Independent	881	23.31%	234
10	Tseminyü	85.83%	Riga Thong	NNO	2,217	53.19%	Vivekha	UDF	1,951	46.81%	266
11	Pughoboto	78.71%	Hosheto Sema	Independent	1,724	41.13%	Kiyelho Sema	NNO	1,400	33.40%	324
12	Southern Angami I	83.08%	Vitsonie	UDF	1,610	53.94%	Kehozhol Khieya	NNO	854	28.61%	756
13	Southern Angami II	80.71%	Hosal Kin	NNO	1,575	51.64%	Niza	UDF	1,475	48.36%	100
14	Pfütsero	79.56%	Weprenyi Kapfo	Independent	1,489	48.05%	Wezulhi Krome	NNO	1,002	32.33%	487
15	Chozuba I	94.18%	Vamuzo	UDF	1,575	63.15%	Pudenu Demo	NNO	919	36.85%	656
16	Chozuba II	80.64%	Punuhu	Independent	860	24.20%	Zhovepra Rosetso	Independent	842	23.69%	18
17	Phek	80.20%	Yevehu Lohe	Independent	911	22.22%	Lhuthipru	Independent	901	21.98%	10
18	Chizami	85.79%	Wetezulo Naro	Independent	1,022	36.57%	Soyie	Independent	618	22.11%	404
19	Meluri	86.04%	Marhutho	UDF	1,072	35.06%	Moses	Independent	808	26.42%	264
20	Tuli	99.41%	Merachiba	NNO	1,409	49.30%	Lakato	UDF	1,146	40.10%	263
21	Arkakong	83.31%	R. C. Chiten Jamir	NNO	1,267	31.66%	Noklen Jamir	UDF	1,225	30.61%	42
22	Yisemyong	80.21%	Sentichuba	UDF	1,342	40.00%	Kariba	Independent	1,262	37.62%	80
23	Mongoya	90.70%	Takomeren	UDF	984	36.81%	Imtimeren	NNO	961	35.95%	23
24	Mokokchung Town	55.09%	Assamwati	NNO	1,492	55.65%	Kilensuwa	Independent	751	28.01%	741
25	Aonglenden	89.37%	Bendangangshi	UDF	1,003	26.63%	Kilangmeren	Independent	995	26.42%	8
26	Koridang	82.11%	Tajen Ao	UDF	1,084	34.74%	Subongmeren	Independent	766	24.55%	318
27	Impur	88.74%	Koramoa Jamir	NNO	2,231	51.82%	Shilokaba	Independent	2,069	48.06%	162
28	Jangpetkong	75.65%	I. Arienba	Independent	1,513	40.85%	Imchalemba Ao	NNO	1,423	38.42%	90
29	Alongtaki	84.00%	Zulutemba Jamit	NNO	1,185	33.59%	Yimsentsulak	Independent	856	24.26%	329
30	Akuluto	82.68%	Hokishe Sema	NNO	1,647	47.08%	I. Khehoto Sema	Independent	1,059	30.27%	588
31	Atoizu	80.85%	Kiyekhu Shikhu	NNO	1,666	36.64%	Rev. Ilhoshe Khala	UDF	1,210	26.61%	456
32	Suruhoto	72.93%	Nihovi Sema	NNO	1,881	49.99%	A. I. Pukhahe Sema	Independent	1,318	35.03%	563
33	Aghunato	74.08%	Iheze Sema	NNO	2,544	69.66%	K. Hukato Yepdihomi	Independent	876	23.99%	1,668
34	Zünheboto	79.94%	Tokheho Sema	Independent	2,151	47.03%	C. Zhenito Sema	Independent	1,379	30.15%	772
35	Satakha	74.03%	Yeshito	NNO	1,650	41.81%	Avito Kibami	Independent	1,576	39.94%	74
36	Tyüi	95.70%	T. A. Ngullie	NNO	1,853	53.74%	Santsurhomo Ezung	Independent	1,595	46.26%	258
37	Wokha	86.21%	N. L. Odyuo	NNO	1,517	41.83%	Wopansao	Independent	1,485	40.94%	32
38	Moilan Wozhuro	86.59%	Nsemo Ovung	UDF	1,175	51.83%	M. Wopemo Lotha	Independent	438	19.32%	737
39	Sanis	87.21%	Mhondamo Kithan	NNO	1,199	41.26%	T. Nchibemo Ngullie	UDF	1,147	39.47%	52
40	Bhandari	86.54%	Tsenlamo Kikon	NNO	2,015	62.83%	R. L. Kinghen	Independent	1,185	36.95%	830

== See also ==
- List of constituencies of the Nagaland Legislative Assembly
- 1969 elections in India
