= 1987 Nagaland Legislative Assembly election =

Legislative Assembly election in Nagaland, India

← 1982	18 November 1987	1989 →

All 60 seats in the Nagaland Legislative Assembly 31 seats needed for a majority
- Registered: 581,953
- Turnout: 84.53%
	Majority party	Minority party
	INC	NND
Leader	Hokishe Sema
Party	INC	NND
Leader's seat	Aonglenden
Seats before	24	24
Seats won	34	18
Seat change	▲10	▼6
Popular vote	39.84%	30.33%
CM before election
Hokishe Sema
Indian National Congress
Elected CM
Hokishe Sema
INC

Elections to the Nagaland Legislative Assembly were held in November 1987 to elect members of the 60 constituencies in Nagaland, India. The Indian National Congress won the most seats and Hokishe Sema was appointed as the Chief Minister of Nagaland. The number of constituencies was set as 60 by the recommendation of the Delimitation Commission of India.

== Result ==
Party	Votes	%	Seats	+/–
Indian National Congress	193,199	36.10	34	▲10
Naga National Democratic Party	140,112	26.18	18	▼6
Nagaland Peoples Front	43,782	8.18	1	New
Bharatiya Janata Party	926	0.17	0	New
Independents	157,173	29.37	7	▼5
Total	535,192	100.00	60	0
Valid votes	535,192	98.71		
Invalid/blank votes	6,980	1.29		
Total votes	542,172	100.00		
Registered voters/turnout	581,953	93.16		
Source: ECI

=== Results by constituency ===
Winner, runner-up, voter turnout, and victory margin in every constituency
Assembly Constituency		Turnout	Winner				Runner Up				Margin
#k	Names	%	Candidate	Party	Votes	%	Candidate	Party	Votes	%	Margin
1	Dimapur I	63.38	Hokishe Sema	INC	10,790	54.12	Crellan Pesyie	IND	5,525	27.71	5,265
2	Dimapur II	63.62	Imtisunget Jamir	IND	8,763	40.89	I. Vikheshe	INC	8,280	38.63	483
3	Dimapur III	80.58	Vihepu Yephthomi	IND	4,200	47.46	Prodep Singyong	NND	2,825	31.92	1,375
4	Ghaspani I	58.37	Shikiho Sema	INC	10,551	54.90	H. Khekiho Zhimomi	NPP	6,795	35.36	3,756
5	Ghaspani II	87.28	Rokonicha	NND	3,483	25.88	Hekiye L.	IND	3,400	25.26	83
6	Tening	97.81	Henlum L. Singson	INC	2,235	26.56	T. R. Zeliang	NND	2,182	25.93	53
7	Peren	90.32	Bangdi Lheilung	NND	2,548	27.24	N. C. Zeliang	INC	1,863	19.92	685
8	Western Angami	73.28	Shurhiu	NND	2,811	42.99	Vibikho	INC	2,125	32.50	686
9	Kohima Town	60.17	John Bosco Jasokie	INC	4,880	52.28	Khrieketoulie	NND	4,210	45.10	670
10	Northern Angami I	79.45	Dr. Shürhozelie Liezietsu	NND	2,027	35.83	Neikhotso Linyu	NPP	2,024	35.78	3
11	Northern Angami II	90.82	K. V. Keditsu	IND	2,012	22.59	Neiphiu Rio	IND	1,928	21.65	84
12	Tseminyü	89.40	Nillo	INC	3,019	38.87	R. S. Rengma	NND	2,441	31.43	578
13	Pughoboto	94.98	Joshua Achumi	INC	2,502	42.79	Huska Sumi	NPP	2,339	40.00	163
14	Southern Angami I	84.17	Diethoo	IND	2,123	36.56	Puse Zhotso	INC	1,221	21.03	902
15	Southern Angami II	87.02	Vizadel Sakhrie	INC	2,080	38.89	Vizol Koso	NND	1,985	37.12	95
16	Pfütsero	77.80	Jhenucho	NND	3,543	50.99	Lhiweshelo Mero	INC	3,291	47.36	252
17	Chizami	92.40	Zhovehu Lohe	INC	2,872	38.12	K. G. Kenye	NND	2,554	33.90	318
18	Chozuba	84.91	Vamuzo Phesao	NND	5,250	56.02	Nuzota Swuro	INC	3,970	42.36	1,280
19	Phek	85.90	Vejoyi	NND	3,653	48.20	Zachilhu Vadeo	INC	3,473	45.82	180
20	Meluri	91.35	Chiekhutso	NND	2,673	36.35	Asang	IND	2,156	29.32	517
21	Tuli	97.87	T. Tali	NND	5,906	56.71	Tsuknungpenzu	INC	3,532	33.92	2,374
22	Arkakong	98.79	Jongpongchiten	INC	3,747	43.54	Marchiba	NPP	2,494	28.98	1,253
23	Impur	99.39	T. Chuba	IND	4,246	44.88	S. Lima Aier	INC	3,567	37.71	679
24	Angetyongpang	92.53	Akumbenba	NPP	2,227	28.90	S. Lima	INC	2,068	26.83	159
25	Mongoya	81.78	N. I. Jamir	INC	4,220	58.27	J. Maputemjen	IND	1,274	17.59	2,946
26	Aonglenden	86.02	Nungshizenba	INC	3,686	59.70	M. Bendangnukshi	NND	2,421	39.21	1,265
27	Mokokchung Town	83.25	Imtimeren	INC	861	37.10	Imkongmar	IND	784	33.78	77
28	Koridang	91.03	Nokzenketba	INC	3,045	32.32	Bendangtoshi	IND	2,426	25.75	619
29	Jangpetkong	95.06	Chubatemjen Ao	INC	2,516	42.58	Kiremwati	IND	1,765	29.87	751
30	Alongtaki	98.42	Tiameren Imchen	INC	2,082	34.71	Aomeri	IND	1,772	29.54	310
31	Akuluto	93.05	I. Khehoto Sema	INC	1,644	40.11	I. Vitokhe Sema	NND	1,455	35.50	189
32	Atoizu	90.51	Kiyezhe L. Chishi	INC	2,847	47.25	N. Yeshito Chishi	IND	2,721	45.15	126
33	Suruhoto	96.11	Kiyezhe Sema	INC	2,677	43.05	Khukivi Awomi	NND	2,671	42.95	6
34	Aghunato	92.55	K. Kihoto Hollohon	INC	1,872	34.41	Nihokhe	NND	1,697	31.19	175
35	Zünheboto	73.83	Ghutoshe	INC	2,432	36.43	Tokheho	NND	1,632	24.45	800
36	Satakha	89.09	Hokheto	INC	2,902	48.09	Kughavi	NND	2,871	47.57	31
37	Tyüi	85.36	N. L. Odyuo	NND	4,254	49.43	T. A. Ngullie	INC	3,632	42.20	622
38	Wokha	76.13	John Lotha	IND	3,689	37.07	Dr. T. M. Lotha	NND	3,349	33.65	340
39	Sanis	81.25	T. Nchibemo Ngullie	INC	2,715	39.63	Nkhoa	NND	2,558	37.34	157
40	Bhandari	89.71	Tsenlamo Kikon	NND	3,698	41.64	E. Thungohamo Ezung	INC	3,606	40.61	92
41	Tizit	94.25	N. Yeangphong Konyak	INC	5,161	53.35	B. Tingkap Wangnao	NND	3,374	34.88	1,787
42	Wakching	88.65	Chingwang Konyak	INC	5,151	55.58	P. Enyei	NND	4,007	43.24	1,144
43	Tapi	97.10	Noke Wangnao	NND	3,125	42.84	M. L. Tongwang	INC	2,196	30.11	929
44	Phomching	98.21	P. Pohwang	INC	4,226	55.26	Kongam	NND	3,339	43.66	887
45	Tehok	96.89	T. P. Manlen Konyak	NND	3,382	41.65	C. Nocklem Konyak	INC	3,242	39.93	140
46	Mon Town	88.92	S. Yokten	INC	6,492	61.22	K. Tingnei	NND	3,187	30.05	3,305
47	Aboi	94.75	W. Eyung	INC	2,868	42.88	Khampei Konyak	IND	1,555	23.25	1,313
48	Moka	98.90	A. Nyamnyei Konyak	INC	3,017	36.43	K. Kiko Konyak	IND	2,838	34.27	179
49	Tamlu	99.61	Bangjak Phom	INC	3,434	51.50	H. N. Yemliphom	NND	3,183	47.74	251
50	Longleng	98.59	Chenlom Phom	INC	2,736	30.28	Heongphom	IND	2,248	24.88	488
51	Noksen	94.99	C. Chongshen Chang	INC	2,144	49.77	H. Chuba Chang	IND	1,313	30.48	831
52	Longkhim Chare	94.46	Thrinimong Sangtam	IND	2,468	29.79	S. Kyukhangba Sangtam	INC	2,121	25.60	347
53	Tuensang Sadar I	82.86	Changkong Chang	INC	3,489	48.44	S. Khoney	IND	1,742	24.18	1,747
54	Tuensang Sadar II	98.23	Lakiumong	INC	2,659	43.53	M. B. Yimkong	IND	1,754	28.72	905
55	Tobu	96.15	A. Sopen	NND	3,991	39.53	Sheakpong Konyak	INC	3,647	36.12	344
56	Noklak	94.55	Sedem Khaming	NND	1,997	31.43	Tochi Hanso	IND	1,843	29.01	154
57	Thonoknyu	95.45	P. Pongom	NND	1,793	27.13	S. Heno Khiamniungan	INC	1,540	23.30	253
58	Shamator–Chessore	93.38	K. Zungkum Yimchunger	NND	2,189	31.33	Yamukum	INC	1,905	27.26	284
59	Seyochung–Sitimi	90.42	Yopikyu Thongtsar	NND	3,695	54.44	S. Sethricho Sangtam	INC	2,817	41.51	878
60	Pungro–Kiphire	92.59	T. Rothrong	INC	4,732	51.50	T. Torechu	NND	4,384	47.71	348

== See also ==
- List of constituencies of the Nagaland Legislative Assembly
