= 1993 Nagaland Legislative Assembly election =

Legislative Assembly election in Nagaland, India

- 15 February 1993

All 60 seats in the Nagaland Legislative Assembly 31 seats needed for a majority
- Registered: 802,911
- Turnout: 91.53%
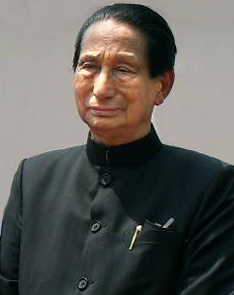
| | Majority party | Minority party |
|---|---|---|
| | | NPF |
| Leader | S. C. Jamir |
| Party | INC | NPF |
| Leader's seat | Mokokchung Town |
| Seats before | 36 | – |
| Seats won | 35 | 17 |
| Seat change | ▼1 | New |
| Popular vote | 46.02% | 32.82% |
| Swing | | New |
CM before election
President's Rule
Elected CM
S. C. Jamir
INC

Elections to the Nagaland Legislative Assembly were held in February 1993 to elect members of the 60 constituencies in Nagaland, India. The Indian National Congress won the most seats and S. C. Jamir was appointed as the Chief Minister of Nagaland for the third time. The number of constituencies was set as 60 by the recommendation of the Delimitation Commission of India.

== Result ==
| Party | Votes | % | Seats | +/– |
|---|---|---|---|---|
| Indian National Congress | 335,834 | 46.02 | 35 | ▼1 |
| Naga People's Front | 239,505 | 32.82 | 17 | New |
| Democratic Labour Party | 3,755 | 0.51 | 1 | New |
| Bharatiya Janata Party | 2,561 | 0.35 | 0 | New |
| Independents | 148,074 | 20.29 | 7 | ▲7 |
| Total | 729,729 | 100.00 | 60 | 0 |
| Valid votes | 729,729 | 99.29 | | |
| Invalid/blank votes | 5,206 | 0.71 | | |
| Total votes | 734,935 | 100.00 | | |
| Registered voters/turnout | 802,911 | 91.53 | | |
Source: ECI

=== Results by constituency ===
Winner, runner-up, voter turnout, and victory margin in every constituency
| Assembly Constituency | | Turnout | Winner | | | | Runner Up | | | | Margin |
| #k | Names | % | Candidate | Party | Votes | % | Candidate | Party | Votes | % | Margin |
|---|---|---|---|---|---|---|---|---|---|---|---|
| 1 | Dimapur I | 85.46 | I. Vikheshe | IND | 7,573 | 43.13 | Hokishe Sema | INC | 7,436 | 42.35 | 137 |
| 2 | Dimapur II | 83.62 | S. I. Jamir | INC | 15,385 | 53.15 | Golmei Patrick | IND | 10,939 | 37.79 | 4,446 |
| 3 | Dimapur III | 83.31 | Kihoto Hollohon | INC | 6,478 | 57.29 | Rajiv | IND | 1,696 | 15.00 | 4,782 |
| 4 | Ghaspani I | 96.12 | Shikiho | INC | 28,406 | 58.24 | Razouvotuo | NPF | 19,856 | 40.71 | 8,550 |
| 5 | Ghaspani II | 95.59 | Kakheto | INC | 10,407 | 51.73 | Rokonicha | NPF | 9,291 | 46.18 | 1,116 |
| 6 | Tening | 96.59 | T. R. Zeliang | INC | 6,005 | 34.92 | Lalkholen | IND | 3,461 | 20.13 | 2,544 |
| 7 | Peren | 85.94 | Neiba Ndang | INC | 5,686 | 41.72 | Bangdi Lheilung | NPF | 4,277 | 31.38 | 1,409 |
| 8 | Western Angami | 74.82 | Shurhiu | NPF | 3,215 | 35.55 | Asu Keyho | IND | 2,978 | 32.93 | 237 |
| 9 | Kohima Town | 75.42 | Z. Obed | INC | 7,732 | 50.86 | K. V. Keditsu | IND | 4,142 | 27.24 | 3,590 |
| 10 | Northern Angami I | - | Shürhozelie Liezietsu | NPF | Elected Unopposed | | | | | | |
| 11 | Northern Angami II | 94.13 | Neiphiu Rio | INC | 5,411 | 44.36 | R. Sopu Angami | IND | 4,311 | 35.34 | 1,100 |
| 12 | Tseminyü | 92.19 | Nillo | INC | 8,369 | 63.65 | Khasu Kath | NPF | 4,658 | 35.42 | 3,711 |
| 13 | Pughoboto | 88.82 | Huska Sumi | NPF | 3,395 | 37.17 | Joshua Sema | IND | 3,239 | 35.46 | 156 |
| 14 | Southern Angami I | 91.06 | Ruguozelhou | NPF | 5,448 | 59.52 | Mavil Khieya | INC | 3,230 | 35.29 | 2,218 |
| 15 | Southern Angami II | 83.37 | Viswesül Pusa | IND | 3,572 | 47.13 | Vizadel Sakhrie | INC | 2,948 | 38.90 | 624 |
| 16 | Pfütsero | 85.77 | Kewekhape | INC | 7,473 | 57.65 | Thenucho | NPF | 5,425 | 41.85 | 2,048 |
| 17 | Chizami | 92.42 | Zhovehu Lohe | INC | 4,031 | 39.81 | Kewezu | NPF | 3,771 | 37.24 | 260 |
| 18 | Chozuba | 90.03 | Vamüzo Phesao | NPF | 5,506 | 43.93 | Povotso Lohe | INC | 4,702 | 37.51 | 804 |
| 19 | Phek | 88.22 | Zachilhu Vadeo | INC | 5,836 | 52.14 | Küzholuzo Nienü | NPF | 5,274 | 47.11 | 562 |
| 20 | Meluri | 92.21 | Zutsepa Katiry | NPF | 4,589 | 41.89 | Khuosatho | INC | 4,227 | 38.58 | 362 |
| 21 | Tuli | 97.04 | T. Tali | INC | 8,042 | 56.49 | Lakato | NPF | 6,189 | 43.47 | 1,853 |
| 22 | Arkakong | 99.70 | Soalemba | INC | 6,552 | 55.25 | M. Pongener | IND | 5,297 | 44.67 | 1,255 |
| 23 | Impur | 99.41 | T. Yupangnenba | INC | 3,133 | 34.06 | Temjentemsu | IND | 3,112 | 33.83 | 21 |
| 24 | Angetyongpang | 99.01 | Tongpang Ozüküm | NPF | 4,433 | 38.07 | S. Limatemjen | INC | 4,037 | 34.67 | 396 |
| 25 | Mongoya | 98.27 | N. I. Jamir | INC | 5,389 | 49.55 | Temjentoshi | IND | 4,863 | 44.71 | 526 |
| 26 | Aonglenden | 91.45 | Nungshizenba | INC | 6,157 | 73.84 | Bendangnukshi | NPF | 2,146 | 25.74 | 4,011 |
| 27 | Mokokchung Town | 97.56 | S. C. Jamir | INC | 4,580 | 97.93 | Bendangtoshi | NPF | 86 | 1.84 | 4,494 |
| 28 | Koridang | 98.19 | T. Nokyu Longchar | IND | 3,957 | 28.05 | Alemwapang | IND | 3,701 | 26.23 | 256 |
| 29 | Jangpetkong | 92.75 | I. Imkong | INC | 6,281 | 71.40 | Chubatemjen Ao | NPF | 2,504 | 28.46 | 3,777 |
| 30 | Alongtaki | 99.38 | Tongpangnungshi | IND | 4,605 | 46.14 | Tiameren | INC | 2,931 | 29.37 | 1,674 |
| 31 | Akuluto | 92.73 | Kazheto Kinimi | IND | 2,637 | 46.36 | Khehoto | INC | 2,108 | 37.06 | 529 |
| 32 | Atoizu | 93.54 | Kiyezhe L. Chishi | INC | 5,453 | 76.67 | Mihozhe | NPF | 1,623 | 22.82 | 3,830 |
| 33 | Suruhoto | 95.09 | Kiyezhe Aye | INC | 5,608 | 61.76 | Vihoshe | IND | 2,661 | 29.30 | 2,947 |
| 34 | Aghunato | 87.56 | Tokheho Yepthomi | INC | 3,885 | 54.42 | Tohevi | NPF | 3,200 | 44.82 | 685 |
| 35 | Zünheboto | 82.89 | Khekiho | IND | 4,810 | 53.89 | Tokheho Sema | INC | 2,510 | 28.12 | 2,300 |
| 36 | Satakha | 93.57 | G. Kughvi | NPF | 2,848 | 42.06 | Asheto | IND | 2,255 | 33.30 | 593 |
| 37 | Tyüi | 84.64 | T. A. Ngullie | NPF | 5,409 | 50.81 | C. Yilumo Kithan | IND | 4,523 | 42.49 | 886 |
| 38 | Wokha | 72.68 | John Lotha | INC | 4,386 | 28.61 | Dr. T. M. Lotha | IND | 4,181 | 27.28 | 205 |
| 39 | Sanis | 92.68 | Y. Sulanthung H. Lotha | DLP | 3,245 | 29.35 | Nkhao Jami | NPF | 2,938 | 26.57 | 307 |
| 40 | Bhandari | 90.69 | Tsenlamo Kikon | NPF | 3,753 | 36.88 | E. Thungohamo Ezung | INC | 3,521 | 34.60 | 232 |
| 41 | Tizit | 96.06 | B. Tingkap Wangnao | INC | 5,308 | 39.54 | Aloh | IND | 4,601 | 34.28 | 707 |
| 42 | Wakching | 98.53 | P. Enyei | NPF | 7,251 | 50.66 | Chingwang Konyak | INC | 6,839 | 47.78 | 412 |
| 43 | Tapi | 88.31 | Bongnao | INC | 4,756 | 57.09 | Noke Wangnao | NPF | 3,545 | 42.55 | 1,211 |
| 44 | Phomching | 99.76 | Kongam | INC | 7,372 | 51.65 | Pohwang Konyak | NPF | 6,840 | 47.93 | 532 |
| 45 | Tehok | 94.67 | T. P. Manlen Konyak | NPF | 9,443 | 76.35 | Chennyeim | INC | 2,821 | 22.81 | 6,622 |
| 46 | Mon Town | 84.56 | S. Yokten | INC | 7,212 | 55.31 | John Konyak | NPF | 5,720 | 43.87 | 1,492 |
| 47 | Aboi | 96.99 | W. Eyong | NPF | 4,632 | 58.49 | Nyeiwang Konyak | INC | 3,250 | 41.04 | 1,382 |
| 48 | Moka | 99.58 | A. Nyamnyei Konyak | INC | 6,684 | 54.80 | E. E. Pangteang | NPF | 5,480 | 44.93 | 1,204 |
| 49 | Tamlu | 99.99 | B. Phongshak Phom | INC | 14,000 | 68.45 | H. Nyemli Phom | NPF | 6,439 | 31.48 | 7,561 |
| 50 | Longleng | 99.86 | M. Chemlom Phom | NPF | 11,840 | 51.84 | Bukchem Phom | INC | 10,964 | 48.01 | 876 |
| 51 | Noksen | 94.89 | H. Chuba Chang | INC | 2,838 | 54.43 | C. Chongshen Chang | NPF | 2,324 | 44.57 | 514 |
| 52 | Longkhim Chare | 99.42 | S. Kyukhangba Sangtam | INC | 7,302 | 60.18 | Thrinimong Sangtam | NPF | 4,794 | 39.51 | 2,508 |
| 53 | Tuensang Sadar I | 82.54 | Changkong Chang | INC | 4,918 | 47.26 | Kechingba Yimchunger | NPF | 3,155 | 30.32 | 1,763 |
| 54 | Tuensang Sadar II | 92.54 | K. Imlong Chang | NPF | 6,411 | 63.67 | A. Lakiumong Yimchunger | INC | 3,652 | 36.27 | 2,759 |
| 55 | Tobu | 97.81 | Pongchallenpa | IND | 5,855 | 42.77 | S. Hongpe Konyak | NPF | 3,967 | 28.98 | 1,888 |
| 56 | Noklak | 94.77 | Sedem Khaming | NPF | 3,427 | 39.34 | W. Chuba Khaim | INC | 3,207 | 36.82 | 220 |
| 57 | Thonoknyu | 98.17 | T. Khongo | NPF | 3,206 | 32.67 | Khisangmong | IND | 2,944 | 30.00 | 262 |
| 58 | Shamator–Chessore | 98.04 | K. Yamakam | INC | 5,121 | 44.62 | Y. Throngshi | NPF | 3,226 | 28.11 | 1,895 |
| 59 | Seyochung–Sitimi | 83.01 | S. Sethricho Sangtam | INC | 6,130 | 55.59 | C. Kipili Sangtam | NPF | 4,871 | 44.17 | 1,259 |
| 60 | Pungro–Kiphire | 89.95 | R. L. Akamba | INC | 4,891 | 29.04 | R. Sapikiu | NPF | 4,686 | 27.83 | 205 |

== See also ==
- List of constituencies of the Nagaland Legislative Assembly
