= Picto Shohe =

Indian politician (born 1959)

Picto Shohe (born 1959) is an Indian politician from Nagaland. He is an MLA from Atoizu Assembly constituency, which is reserved for Scheduled Tribes, in Zunheboto District. He won the 2023 Nagaland Legislative Assembly election, representing the Nationalist Congress Party.

== Early life and education ==
Shohe is from Atoizu, Zunheboto District, Nagaland. He is the son of the late Khozheto. He obtained his diploma in civil engineering, in 1977 at Khelhoshe Polytechnic, Asukhuto. His wife is a florist.

== Career ==
Shohe won from the Atoizu constituency representing the Nationalist Congress Party in the 2023 Nagaland assembly election. He polled 8,294 votes and defeated his nearest rival, Kahuli Sema of the Bharatiya Janata Party, by a margin of 602 votes. Earlier on 3 February 2023, Shohe resigned from the 13th Nagaland Assembly as his party, the NDDP denied him a ticket for the constituency, as its alliance partner BJP nominated Sema, an engineer, from Atoizu. He then joined the NCP and successfully contested the 2023 election. Later, NCP which won 12 seats in the election, elected Shohe as the legislature party leader.

He first became an MLA in the 2013 Nagaland Legislative Assembly election as an independent candidate, defeating Doshehe Y Sema of the NPF by a margin of 3,284 votes. He retained the seat in the 2018 Assembly election representing the Naga People's Front and defeated former chief minister K. L. Chishi of the Bharatiya Janata Party by a margin of 838 which was 5.62% of the total votes cast.

In 2025, he joined the NPF.
