= 1998 Nagaland Legislative Assembly election =

Legislative Assembly election in Nagaland, India

- 23 February 1998

All 60 seats in the Nagaland Legislative Assembly 31 seats needed for a majority
- Registered: 260,646
- Turnout: 78.95%
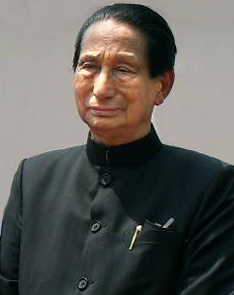
	Majority party
Leader	S. C. Jamir
Party	INC
Leader's seat	Aonglenden
Seats before	35
Seats won	53
Seat change	▲18
Popular vote	50.73%
CM before election
President's Rule
INC
Elected CM
S. C. Jamir
INC

Elections to the Nagaland Legislative Assembly were held in February 1998 to elect members of the 60 constituencies in Nagaland, India. The Indian National Congress won a majority of the seats and S. C. Jamir was re-appointed as the Chief Minister of Nagaland. The number of constituencies was set as 60 by the recommendation of the Delimitation Commission of India.

Regional parties like the Naga People's Front did not contest these elections, and they were joined by the Bharatiya Janata Party in this action. In 43 of the constituencies, the INC candidate was the sole candidate and hence was declared the winner without a poll. In the other 17 constituencies, the INC candidate had to compete with one or more Independents. The Independents managed to win 7 of these seats.

== Background ==
In 1997, the NSCN(I-M) signed a ceasefire agreement with the government. The agreement ensured that while the government would not push for counter-insurgency operations against the NSCN (I-M) cadre and its leadership, the rebels on their part would not target armed forces. The National Socialist Council of Nagaland and the Naga Hoho, (a tribal body), then demanded that upcoming elections should be postponed till the conclusion of the peace talks. Since the Election Commission wasn't amenable to their arguments, they called for a boycott of the polls even issuing threats to the various political parties where necessary.

== Result ==
Party	Votes	%	Seats	+/–
Indian National Congress	103,206	50.73	53	▲18
Independents	100,226	49.27	7	0
Total	203,432	100.00	60	0
Valid votes	203,432	98.86		
Invalid/blank votes	2,356	1.14		
Total votes	205,788	100.00		
Registered voters/turnout	260,646	78.95		
Source: ECI

=== Results by constituency ===
Winner, runner-up, voter turnout, and victory margin in every constituency
Assembly Constituency		Turnout	Winner				Runner Up				Margin
#k	Names	%	Candidate	Party	Votes	%	Candidate	Party	Votes	%	Margin
1	Dimapur I	-	I. Vikheshe	INC	Elected Unopposed						
2	Dimapur II	-	Imtisunget Jamir	INC	Elected Unopposed						
3	Dimapur III	13.68	Atovi Sumi	INC	1,955	83.83	T. L. Angami	IND	337	14.45	1,618
4	Ghaspani I	-	Dr. V. Kanito	INC	Elected Unopposed						
5	Ghaspani II	-	Rokonicha	INC	Elected Unopposed						
6	Tening	-	T. R. Zeliang	INC	Elected Unopposed						
7	Peren	-	Neiba Ndang	INC	Elected Unopposed						
8	Western Angami	64.07	Asu Keyho	IND	5,562	55.98	N. T. Nakhro	INC	4,084	41.10	1,478
9	Kohima Town	71.39	T. Abao Kire	IND	9,166	49.60	Z. Obed	INC	8,706	47.11	460
10	Northern Angami I	-	Dr. Shürhozelie Liezietsu	INC	Elected Unopposed						
11	Northern Angami II	-	Neiphiu Rio	INC	Elected Unopposed						
12	Tseminyü	-	Nillo	INC	Elected Unopposed						
13	Pughoboto	-	Joshua Achumi	INC	Elected Unopposed						
14	Southern Angami I	64.30	Mavil Khieya	IND	3,964	53.33	K. Tase	INC	3,288	44.24	676
15	Southern Angami II	-	Viswesül Pusa	INC	Elected Unopposed						
16	Pfütsero	-	Kewekhape Therie	INC	Elected Unopposed						
17	Chizami	-	Zhovehu Lohe	INC	Elected Unopposed						
18	Chozuba	66.87	Nuzota Swuro	INC	6,533	58.50	Yesonu Veyie	IND	4,526	40.53	2,007
19	Phek	-	Zachilhu Vadeo	INC	Elected Unopposed						
20	Meluri	76.75	Khuosatho	INC	7,001	73.58	Wetetso	IND	2,407	25.30	4,594
21	Tuli	-	T. Tali	INC	Elected Unopposed						
22	Arkakong	-	Imtiyanger	INC	Elected Unopposed						
23	Impur	-	T. Chuba	INC	Elected Unopposed						
24	Angetyongpang	-	Tongpang Ozüküm	INC	Elected Unopposed						
25	Mongoya	-	T. Imtimeren Jamir	INC	Elected Unopposed						
26	Aonglenden	-	S. C. Jamir	INC	Elected Unopposed						
27	Mokokchung Town	-	Nungshizenba	INC	Elected Unopposed						
28	Koridang	-	T. Nokyu Longchar	INC	Elected Unopposed						
29	Jangpetkong	-	I. Imkong	INC	Elected Unopposed						
30	Alongtaki	-	Tongpang Nungshi	INC	Elected Unopposed						
31	Akuluto	-	Kazheto Kinimi	INC	Elected Unopposed						
32	Atoizu	-	Doshehe Y. Sema	INC	Elected Unopposed						
33	Suruhoto	-	Kiyezhe Sema	INC	Elected Unopposed						
34	Aghunato	-	Tokheho Yepthomi	INC	Elected Unopposed						
35	Zünheboto	57.53	Kakheho	IND	5,218	66.83	Ghutoshe Sema	INC	2,445	31.31	2,773
36	Satakha	-	Kaito	INC	Elected Unopposed						
37	Tyüi	-	T. C. K. Lotha	INC	Elected Unopposed						
38	Wokha	-	John Lotha	INC	Elected Unopposed						
39	Sanis	-	Thomas Ngullie	INC	Elected Unopposed						
40	Bhandari	-	L. Yanthungo Patton	INC	Elected Unopposed						
41	Tizit	87.99	Tingkup	INC	6,000	50.64	Yeangphong	IND	5,753	48.55	247
42	Wakching	-	P. Enyei Konyak	INC	Elected Unopposed						
43	Tapi	-	Bongnao	INC	Elected Unopposed						
44	Phomching	-	Kongam	INC	Elected Unopposed						
45	Tehok	-	W. Wongyuh Konyak	INC	Elected Unopposed						
46	Mon Town	96.02	C. John	IND	6,988	50.51	N. Thongwang Konyak	INC	6,647	48.04	341
47	Aboi	92.49	Eyong Konyak	INC	5,452	72.58	Howing	IND	1,957	26.05	3,495
48	Moka	-	A. Nyamnyei Konyak	IND	Elected Unopposed						
49	Tamlu	99.78	Dr. O. Kongyan Phom	INC	11,832	43.85	B. Phongshak Phom	INC	15,120	56.03	-3,288
50	Longleng	98.40	Shami Angh	IND	11,843	44.05	M. Chemlom Phom	INC	11,285	41.97	558
51	Noksen	98.58	H. Chuba Chang	INC	4,624	69.17	Nokshang	IND	2,041	30.53	2,583
52	Longkhim Chare	-	S. Kyukhangba Sangtam	INC	Elected Unopposed						
53	Tuensang Sadar I	87.08	P. Chuba	IND	7,017	56.35	Changkong Chang	INC	5,228	41.99	1,789
54	Tuensang Sadar II	77.42	Kejong Chang	INC	4,479	51.94	K. Imlong Chang	IND	4,104	47.59	375
55	Tobu	-	Sheakpong Konyak	INC	Elected Unopposed						
56	Noklak	-	Sedem Khaming	INC	Elected Unopposed						
57	Thonoknyu	93.83	Shingnyu	INC	3,022	29.97	N. L. Aimong	IND	2,451	24.31	571
58	Shamator–Chessore	-	K. Yamakam	INC	Elected Unopposed						
59	Seyochung–Sitimi	97.04	S. Sethricho Sangtam	INC	7,337	51.66	Kipili	IND	6,809	47.94	528
60	Pungro–Kiphire	-	R. L. Akamba	INC	Elected Unopposed						

== Government Formation ==
On 5 March, S. C. Jamir was sworn in as the Chief Minister, by the Governor Om Prakash Sharma, for his second successive term. In addition, 11 other members of the Legislative assembly were sworn in as ministers in the cabinet. These included the future Chief Minister, Neiphiu Rio, who was made the Home minister.

== See also ==
- List of constituencies of the Nagaland Legislative Assembly
- 1998 elections in India
