= Tokheho Sema =

Indian politician and public servant (1932–2017)

- Born: 19 November 1932; Sukhalu village, Nagaland, India
- Died: 12 January 2017 (aged 84); Guwahati, Assam, India
- Resting place: Sukhalu village
- Occupations: Politician; Public servant
- Known for: Nagaland Interim Body
- Awards: Padma Shri

Tokheho Sema (19 November 1932 – 12 January 2017) was an Indian politician from the state of Nagaland. He served as a member of the 'Nagaland Interim Body' which oversaw the formation of the state in 1963. In 2016, the Government of India awarded him the Padma Shri, the fourth highest civilian honour, for his contribution to public affairs.

== Studies ==
Tokheho studied at the Government High School in Kohima and St. Edmund's School in Shillong.

== Political life ==
As part of the Nagaland Interim Body, he urged the Government of India for strong measures to prevent the escape to foreign countries of the Nagas associated with the nationalist movement.

Sema served as a minister of the state, contested the state assembly elections in 1993 as an Indian National Congress candidate and was a former leader of the Congress legislature party in the assembly.

== Death ==
Sema died on 12 January 2017, at the age of 84.
