= 1964 Nagaland Legislative Assembly election =

Legislative Assembly election in Nagaland, India

- 10 January 1964

All 40 seats in the Nagaland Legislative Assembly 21 seats needed for a majority
- Registered: 124,166
- Turnout: 50.51%
| | Majority party |
|---|---|
| Leader | P. Shilu Ao |
| Party | Independent |
| Leader's seat | Impur |
| Seats won | 40 |
| Seat change | New |
CM before election
Office established
Elected CM
P. Shilu Ao
Independent

The first elections to the Nagaland Legislative Assembly were held in January 1964 to elect members of the 40 constituencies in Nagaland, India. There were no political parties registered and so all the candidates fought as Independents. P. Shilu Ao was appointed as the first Chief Minister of Nagaland.

Nagaland was converted to a state by the State of Nagaland Act, 1962 and elections were called for in 1964.

== Result ==
| Party | Votes | % | Seats |
|---|---|---|---|
| Independents | 62,175 | 100.00 | 40 |
| Total | 62,175 | 100.00 | 40 |
| Valid votes | 62,175 | 99.13 | |
| Invalid/blank votes | 544 | 0.87 | |
| Total votes | 62,719 | 100.00 | |
| Registered voters/turnout | 124,166 | 50.51 | |
Source: ECI

=== Results by constituency ===
Winner, runner-up, voter turnout, and victory margin in every constituency
| Assembly Constituency | | Turnout | Winner | | | | Runner Up | | | | Margin |
| #k | Names | % | Candidate | Party | Votes | % | Candidate | Party | Votes | % | Margin |
|---|---|---|---|---|---|---|---|---|---|---|---|
| 1 | Dimapur III | 61.54% | Govinda Ch. Paira | Independent | 2,226 | 56.33% | Kevichüsa Angami | Independent | 1,722 | 43.57% | 504 |
| 2 | Dimapur III | 74.22% | Debalal Mech | Independent | 1,575 | 59.73% | Vilhuma Angami | Independent | 1,060 | 40.20% | 515 |
| 3 | Ghaspani II | 86.48% | Langkam | Independent | 1,024 | 36.31% | Khelhose Sema | Independent | 879 | 31.17% | 145 |
| 4 | Tening | 73.38% | Lalkholam Singson | Independent | 1,235 | 56.99% | Huthombo | Independent | 700 | 32.30% | 535 |
| 5 | Peren | 82.25% | Longbe | Independent | 1,624 | 62.37% | Levi | Independent | 557 | 21.39% | 1,067 |
| 6 | Western Angami | 70.72% | T. N. Angami | Independent | 1,756 | 65.87% | Kevichusa | Independent | 910 | 34.13% | 846 |
| 7 | Kohima Town | 55.27% | John Bosco Jasokie | Independent | 2,182 | 81.21% | Silie Haralu | Independent | 442 | 16.45% | 1,740 |
| 8 | Northern Angami I | 76.33% | Neiteo | Independent | 1,937 | 81.52% | Z. Yekrulie | Independent | 439 | 18.48% | 1,498 |
| 9 | Northern Angami II | 74.14% | Lhousuohie | Independent | 2,025 | 63.16% | Thinuokielie | Independent | 1,181 | 36.84% | 844 |
| 10 | Tseminyü | 75.57% | Viyekha | Independent | 1,660 | 65.12% | Riga Thong | Independent | 889 | 34.88% | 771 |
| 11 | Pughoboto | - | Kiyelho Sema | Independent | Elected Unopposed | | | | | | |
| 12 | Southern Angami I | 88.72% | Ngurohie Zao | Independent | 1,205 | 46.44% | Kehozhol Khieya | Independent | 981 | 37.80% | 224 |
| 13 | Southern Angami II | 87.03% | Vizol Koso | Independent | 1,696 | 60.18% | Hosal Kin | Independent | 1,122 | 39.82% | 574 |
| 14 | Pfütsero | 86.34% | Wezhulhu | Independent | 1,633 | 69.82% | Kewetso Ritse | Independent | 701 | 29.97% | 932 |
| 15 | Chozuba I | - | Pudenu Demo | Independent | Elected Unopposed | | | | | | |
| 16 | Chozuba II | 78.35% | Netsutso Theyo | Independent | 1,459 | 64.50% | Phukuve | Independent | 790 | 34.92% | 669 |
| 17 | Phek | - | Lhuthipru | Independent | Elected Unopposed | | | | | | |
| 18 | Chizami | 91.17% | Lhusetsu | Independent | 1,509 | 60.87% | Wetezulo Naro | Independent | 563 | 22.71% | 946 |
| 19 | Meluri | - | Amon | Independent | Elected Unopposed | | | | | | |
| 20 | Tuli | 75.23% | Kajenkaba | Independent | 943 | 54.10% | Noklensama Jamir | Independent | 800 | 45.90% | 143 |
| 21 | Arkakong | - | R. C. Chiten Jamir | Independent | Elected Unopposed | | | | | | |
| 22 | Yisemyong | - | Suzumar Imsong | Independent | Elected Unopposed | | | | | | |
| 23 | Mongoya | 66.65% | Bendangangshi | Independent | 1,258 | 79.87% | Tenomayang Ao | Independent | 301 | 19.11% | 957 |
| 24 | Mokokchung Town | 60.74% | Khelhoshe Sema | Independent | 670 | 50.95% | Tekasosang | Independent | 644 | 48.97% | 26 |
| 25 | Aonglenden | 78.71% | Imsumeren | Independent | 1,788 | 87.95% | Kariba Ao | Independent | 242 | 11.90% | 1,546 |
| 26 | Koridang | 75.62% | Tajen Ao | Independent | 1,753 | 87.48% | I. Chubatemsu | Independent | 246 | 12.28% | 1,507 |
| 27 | Impur | - | P. Shilu Ao | Independent | Elected Unopposed | | | | | | |
| 28 | Jangpetkong | 72.19% | R. Lesen | Independent | 1,867 | 80.82% | Imtitoshi Lanu | Independent | 439 | 19.00% | 1,428 |
| 29 | Alongtaki | - | Zulutemba Jamit | Independent | Elected Unopposed | | | | | | |
| 30 | Akuluto | - | Hokishe Sema | Independent | Elected Unopposed | | | | | | |
| 31 | Atoizu | - | Kiyekhu Shikhu | Independent | Elected Unopposed | | | | | | |
| 32 | Suruhoto | - | Nihovi Avemi | Independent | Elected Unopposed | | | | | | |
| 33 | Aghunato | - | Iheze Sema | Independent | Elected Unopposed | | | | | | |
| 34 | Zünheboto | 87.58% | Kihoto | Independent | 1,423 | 54.67% | Tokheno | Independent | 1,162 | 44.64% | 261 |
| 35 | Satakha | - | Yeshito | Independent | Elected Unopposed | | | | | | |
| 36 | Tyüi | 89.84% | Tsanthungo Ngullie | Independent | 1,143 | 45.83% | S. Ezung | Independent | 1,027 | 41.18% | 116 |
| 37 | Wokha | 87.95% | N. L. Odyuo | Independent | 1,310 | 54.07% | Tsatheo Murry | Independent | 1,110 | 45.81% | 200 |
| 38 | Moilan Wozhuro | 80.89% | Nsemo Ovung | Independent | 1,412 | 75.83% | Mhondamo | Independent | 444 | 23.85% | 968 |
| 39 | Sanis | 82.99% | Mhodamo Kithan | Independent | 1,267 | 57.59% | Etssorhomo Ezung | Independent | 924 | 42.00% | 343 |
| 40 | Bhandari | - | Tsenlamo Kikon | Independent | Elected Unopposed | | | | | | |

== Tuensang Regional Council ==
| S. No | Name | Address |
|---|---|---|
| 1 | Kamlichung Akum Imlong | Village Sibongsang, District Tuensang, Nagaland |
| 2 | Tochi Hanso | Village Taloyu, District Tuedsang, Nagaland |
| 3 | Sangnyu Yako Konvak | Village Wakching, Dlstrict Tuensang, Nagaland |
| 4 | Litingse Setongkiu Sangtam | Viilage Chare, District Tuensang, Nagaland |
| 5 | Kilonsba Pire | Village Chessore, District Tumsang, Nagaland |
| 6 | Lipikiu Pisekiu Sangtam | Village Sanchore, District Tuensang, Nagaland |

== Bypolls ==
| Year | Constituency | Reason for by-poll | Winning candidate | Party |
|---|---|---|---|---|
| 1966 | Mokokchung Town | Death of Khelhoshe Sema | A. Longkumer | Independent |

== See also ==
- List of constituencies of the Nagaland Legislative Assembly
- 1964 elections in India
