= Nagaland Nationalist Organisation =

Defunct political party in India

- Founder: A. Kevichüsa
- Founded: 1963
- Dissolved: 1976
- Merged into: Indian National Congress
- Colours: Yellow

Election symbol
- Mithun

Nagaland Nationalist Organisation was a political party in Nagaland, India. It formed the government in Nagaland from 1964 to 1974.

== History ==
Nagaland was converted to a state by the State of Nagaland Act, 1962 and elections were called for in 1964. There were no political parties registered for the first elections and so all the candidates, many of whom were members of the Nagaland National Organisation (NNO), contested as Independents.

In 1976, NNO merged with the Indian National Congress.

== Chief Ministers ==
No	Name	Constituency	Term of office		Days in office
1	P. Shilu Ao	Impur	1 December 1963	14 August 1966	2 years, 256 days
2	T. N. Angami	Western Angami	14 August 1966	22 February 1969	2 years, 192 days
3	Hokishe Sema	Akuluto	22 February 1969	26 February 1974	5 years, 4 days

== Electoral history ==
=== State ===
Elections to the Nagaland Legislative Assembly:

Election	Seats won	Source
1969	22 / 40	
1974	23 / 60	

=== National ===
Elections for the Nagaland (Lok Sabha constituency):

Election	Candidate	Result	Source
1967	S. C. Jamir	Elected unopposed	
1971	S. C. Jamir	Lost	
