= Naga National Democratic Party =

- Leader: John Bosco Jasokie
- Founder: John Bosco Jasokie
- Founded: 1964
- Dissolved: 2003
- Merger of: United Democratic Front (Nagaland); Naga National Party
- Merged into: Naga People's Front
- ECI status: dissolved party

The Naga National Democratic Party is a regional political party in Nagaland, India, founded in 1964. The party was formed from a merger of the United Democratic Front and the Naga National Party. John Bosco Jasokie is the party leader.

This party was founded on certain principles and objectives and one of the first and foremost objective and agenda is to help resolve the Naga political issue, he said. “With this objective in mind, our leaders in 1963, on this day, the 21st October gathered in Kohima and held a meeting and formed a party called Democratic Party of Nagaland (DPN).”

The first nomenclature of the party was DPN under the chairmanship of A Kevichusa. Kikon said the party, so far, have changed the nomenclature seven times. However, the motto of the party and the party symbol remained the same. From 1963- it was DPN. Then, changed into United Front of Nagaland (UFN) in 1969, 1972- United Democratic Front (UDF), 1980- Naga Nationalist Democratic Party (NNDP), 1998- Naga People Council (NPC), 2002- Nagaland People’s Front (NPF) and later changed into Naga People’s Front (NPF).

== Electoral history ==
Assembly	Election	Seats won	Source
Nagaland Legislative Assembly	1982	24 / 60	
Nagaland Legislative Assembly	1987	18 / 60	
