= People's Democratic Alliance (Nagaland) =

Governing coalition in Nagaland

- Abbreviation: PDA
- Leader: Neiphiu Rio
- Founded: 18 September 2021
- Preceded by: Democratic Alliance of Nagaland
- Ideology: Big Tent
- Political position: Big tent
- Alliance: NPF; BJP; other minor parties
- Seats in Nagaland Legislative Assembly: 60 / 60

The People's Democratic Alliance (formerly United Democratic Alliance) is a state-level political alliance in the Indian state of Nagaland.

== Background ==
In the run-up to the 2018 Nagaland Legislative Assembly election, the ruling Naga People's Front split over whether to continue its coalition with the Bharatiya Janata Party. A rebel group led by former chief minister Neiphiu Rio created the Nationalist Democratic Progressive Party, and the NDPP and BJP contested the election in alliance. They won the election, and formed a coalition government under Rio, with the NPF serving as the opposition. The government was called the People's Democratic Alliance.

In the 2023 Nagaland Legislative Assembly election, the ruling Nationalist Democratic Progressive Party and Bharatiya Janata Party alliance secured a comfortable majority and Neiphiu Rio was re-elected as chief minister. Later, all parties joined the government, making Nagaland an oppositionless state. Later in 2025, the NDPP merged with NPF.

== Formation ==
On 22 July 2021, the NPF announced its intention to join the state government, which was ratified by the PDA on 11 August, resulting in the formation of an all-party government. The NPF cited a shared need to resolve the "Naga political issue" and the ongoing negotiations with the National Socialist Council of Nagalim and other separatist groups as the reason for its decision. The new government was initially called the Nagaland Unity Government, but Rio later announced that its name would be the United Democratic Alliance. Several news outlets dubbed the new government "Opposition-less", as all seats in the Legislative Assembly are held by constituent parties. The formation of such a government was criticised by some, with The Naga Rising calling it "a fraud on the people" and noting that there was already an all-party committee on resolving the Naga issue. The Kohima District Congress Committee expressed similar views.

== See also ==
- National unity government
- National Democratic Alliance
- North-East Democratic Alliance
- Fifth Neiphiu Rio ministry
- 51st New Brunswick Legislature, another Commonwealth legislature with a one-party composition
