= 1998 Indian general election =

- 16, 22 and 28 February 1998

543 of the 545 seats in the Lok Sabha (Note: Two seats were reserved for Anglo-Indians and filled by presidential nomination) 272 seats needed for a majority
- Registered: 605,880,192
- Turnout: 61.97% (▲4.03pp)
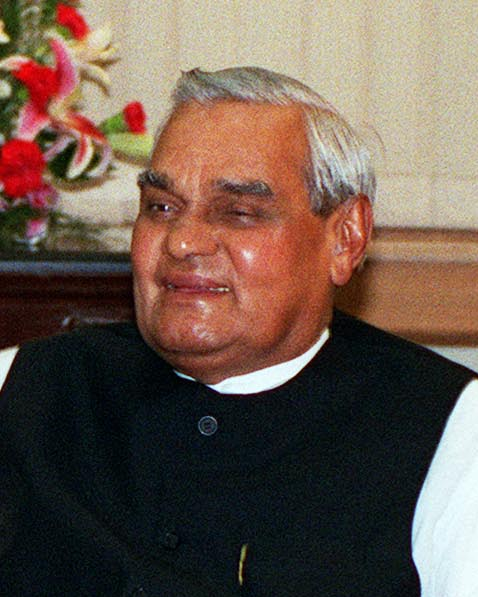

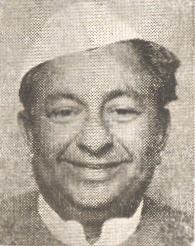

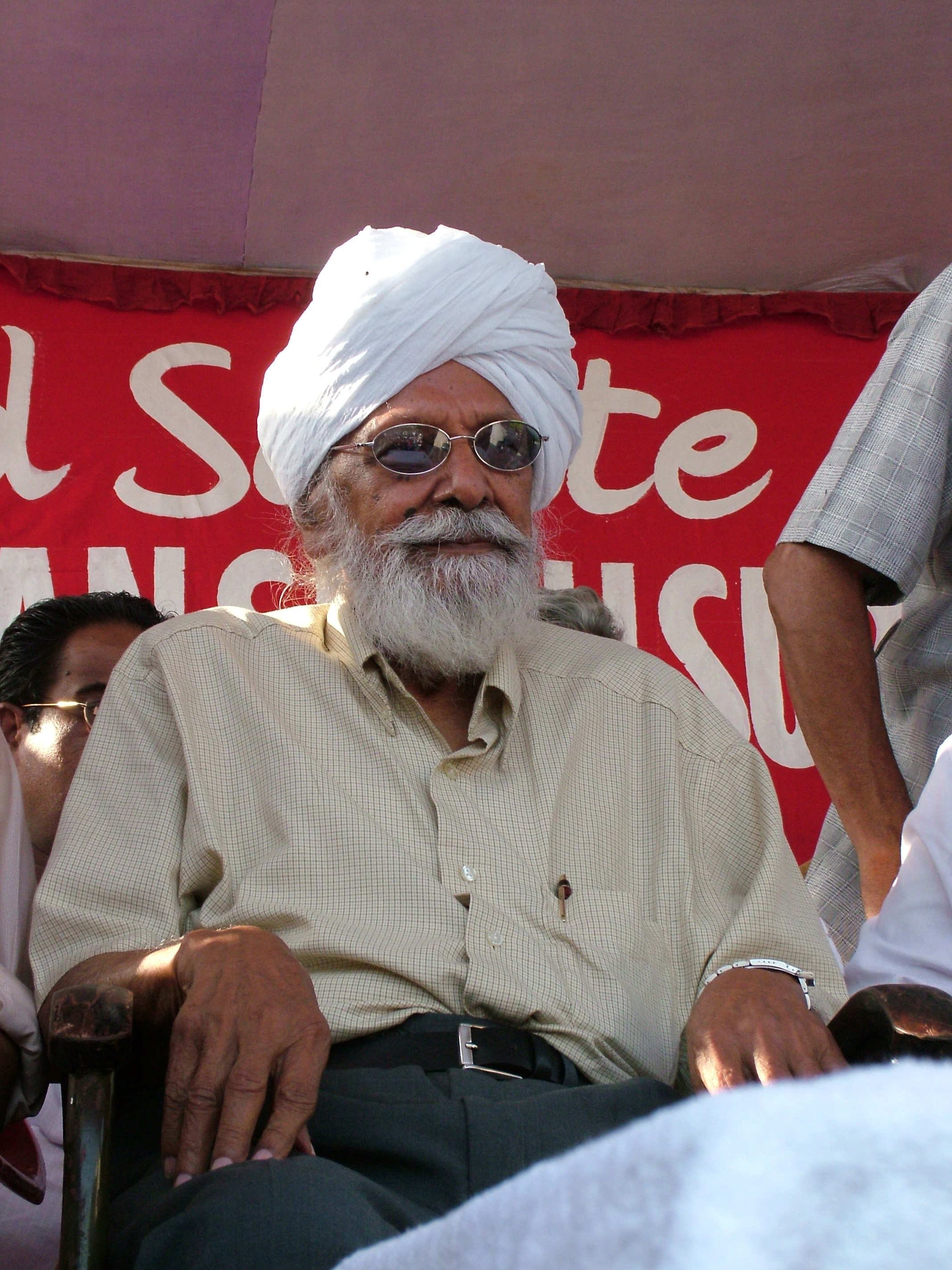
	First party	Second party	Third party
Leader	Atal Bihari Vajpayee	Sitaram Kesri	Harkishan Singh Surjeet
Party	BJP	INC	CPI(M)
Alliance	NDA	INC+	LF
Last election	20.29%, 161 seats	28.80%, 140 seats	6.12%, 32 seats
Seats won	182	141	32
Seat change	▲21	▲1	Steady
Popular vote	94,266,188	95,111,131	18,991,867
Percentage	25.59%	25.82%	5.16%
Swing	▲5.30pp	▼2.98pp	▼0.96pp
Alliance seats	252	166	96
- Results by constituency
Prime Minister before election
Inder Kumar Gujral
JD
Prime Minister after election
Atal Bihari Vajpayee
BJP

General elections were held in India on 16, 22 and 28 February 1998 to elect the members of the twelfth Lok Sabha. The elections were held three years ahead of schedule after the government led by Inder Kumar Gujral collapsed when the Indian National Congress (INC) withdrew its support in November 1997.

The result was another hung parliament, with no party or alliance able to muster a majority. However, Atal Bihari Vajpayee of the Bharatiya Janata Party was able to form a coalition government led by the National Democratic Alliance with the outside support of the Telugu Desam Party and several other parties with just an MP or two, like the parties from North-Eastern states like Arunachal Congress, Manipur Congress, Sikkim Democratic Front. Vajpayee was sworn in as Prime Minister with support from 272 of 543 MPs. However, his government collapsed on 17 April 1999 when the All India Anna Dravida Munnetra Kazhagam withdrew its support, after Vajpayee refused to meet the demands of its leader J. Jayalalithaa, namely halting the corruption cases against her and the sacking of the Tamil Nadu government led by her bete-noire M. Karunanidhi. This led to fresh elections in 1999.

The elections were the second consecutive general elections in which the party that received the most votes did not win the most seats.

== Results ==
Party	Votes	%	Seats
Indian National Congress	95,111,131	25.82	141
Bharatiya Janata Party	94,266,188	25.59	182
Communist Party of India (Marxist)	18,991,867	5.16	32
Samajwadi Party	18,167,640	4.93	20
Bahujan Samaj Party	17,186,779	4.67	5
Janata Dal	11,930,209	3.24	6
Rashtriya Janata Dal	10,229,971	2.78	17
Telugu Desam Party	10,199,463	2.77	12
West Bengal Trinamool Congress	8,920,583	2.42	7
All India Anna Dravida Munnetra Kazhagam	6,731,550	1.83	18
Shiv Sena	6,528,566	1.77	6
Samata Party	6,491,639	1.76	12
Communist Party of India	6,429,569	1.75	9
Dravida Munnetra Kazhagam	5,308,388	1.44	6
Tamil Maanila Congress	5,169,183	1.40	3
Biju Janata Dal	3,669,825	1.00	9
Shiromani Akali Dal	3,001,769	0.81	8
Lok Shakti	2,548,725	0.69	3
All India Rashtriya Janata Party	2,071,643	0.56	1
Revolutionary Socialist Party	2,032,585	0.55	5
Haryana Lok Dal (Rashtriya)	1,956,087	0.53	4
Marumalarchi Dravida Munnetra Kazhagam	1,602,504	0.44	3
Pattali Makkal Katchi	1,548,976	0.42	4
Republican Party of India	1,351,019	0.37	4
Jharkhand Mukti Morcha	1,324,548	0.36	0
All India Forward Bloc	1,213,965	0.33	2
Samajwadi Janata Party (Rashtriya)	1,181,083	0.32	1
Asom Gana Parishad	1,064,977	0.29	0
Communist Party of India (Marxist–Leninist) Liberation	912,698	0.25	0
Haryana Vikas Party	875,803	0.24	1
Muslim League Kerala State Committee	800,765	0.22	2
Jammu & Kashmir National Conference	784,669	0.21	3
Bharatiya Kisan Kamgar Party	711,080	0.19	0
Apna Dal	562,946	0.15	0
All India Majlis-e-Ittehadul Muslimeen	485,785	0.13	1
All India Indira Congress (Secular)	457,510	0.12	1
Puthiya Tamilagam	446,583	0.12	0
Janata Party	444,305	0.12	1
NTR Telugu Desam Party (Lakshmi Parvathi)	384,211	0.10	0
Karnataka Vikas Party	371,346	0.10	0
United Minorities Front, Assam	357,759	0.10	1
Kerala Congress (M)	356,168	0.10	1
Kerala Congress	327,649	0.09	0
MGR Anna Dravida Munnetra Kazhagam	278,324	0.08	0
Forward Bloc (Socialist)	272,974	0.07	0
Peasants and Workers Party of India	269,609	0.07	1
Marxist Co-ordination Committee	263,901	0.07	0
Shiromani Akali Dal (Simranjit Singh Mann)	248,529	0.07	0
Jharkhand Mukti Morcha (Mardi)	240,897	0.07	0
Bihar Jana Congress	222,371	0.06	0
United Democratic Party	213,924	0.06	0
Gondwana Ganatantra Party	196,662	0.05	0
Manipur State Congress Party	190,358	0.05	1
Autonomous State Demand Committee	184,241	0.05	1
Jharkhand Party (Naren)	181,018	0.05	0
Arunachal Congress	172,496	0.05	2
Ajeya Bharat Party	157,854	0.04	0
United Reservation Movement Council of Assam	151,543	0.04	0
National Loktantrik Party	147,706	0.04	0
United Goans Democratic Party	132,558	0.04	0
Mahabharat People's Party	115,785	0.03	0
Sikkim Democratic Front	102,440	0.03	1
Peoples Democratic Party	92,083	0.02	0
Akhil Bharatiya Sena	90,035	0.02	0
Indian National League	86,697	0.02	0
Himachal Vikas Congress	85,046	0.02	0
Mizo National Front	82,047	0.02	0
Savarn Samaj Party	76,980	0.02	0
Maharashtrawadi Gomantak Party	70,191	0.02	0
Jharkhand Party	63,836	0.02	0
Hill State People's Democratic Party	62,144	0.02	0
Loktantrik Samajwadi Party	43,770	0.01	0
Bahujan Samaj Party (Ambedkar)	43,402	0.01	0
Indian Congress (Socialist)	36,677	0.01	0
Uttarakhand Kranti Dal	30,654	0.01	0
Akhil Bartiya Manav Seva Dal	26,027	0.01	0
National Panthers Party	24,638	0.01	0
Marxist Communist Party of India (S.S. Srivastava)	24,417	0.01	0
Shoshit Samaj Dal	24,303	0.01	0
Proutist Sarva Samaj Samiti	23,029	0.01	0
Chhattisgarh Mukti Morcha	20,928	0.01	0
Jammu and Kashmir Awami League	20,843	0.01	0
Amra Bangali	20,372	0.01	0
Kannada Chalavali Vatal Paksha	19,202	0.01	0
Garo National Council	16,280	0.00	0
Akhil Bharatiya Jan Sangh	14,284	0.00	0
Akhil Bharat Hindu Mahasabha	14,160	0.00	0
Plain Tribals Council of Assam	12,952	0.00	0
Bharatiya Vikash Party	11,881	0.00	0
United Tribal Nationalist Liberation Front	11,287	0.00	0
Rajasthan Vikas Party	11,267	0.00	0
Karnataka Rajya Ryota Sangha	10,064	0.00	0
United Communist Party of India	10,018	0.00	0
Bharti Lok Lehar Party	9,959	0.00	0
Samajwadi Jan Parishad	9,848	0.00	0
Hindustan Janata Party	9,476	0.00	0
Bharatiya Jantantrik Parishad	9,367	0.00	0
Maharashtra Rashtravadi Congress	8,623	0.00	0
Jharkhand People's Party	7,111	0.00	0
Sarvadharam Party (Madhya Pradesh)	6,671	0.00	0
Akhil Bharatiya Rajivwadi Congress (Dubey)	6,455	0.00	0
Bharatiya Rajiv Congress	6,122	0.00	0
Kisan Vikas Party	5,905	0.00	0
Jai Telangana Party	5,847	0.00	0
Akhil Bharatiya Bhrastachar Normoolan Sena	5,718	0.00	0
All India Rajiv Krantikari Congress	5,588	0.00	0
Pragtisheel Manav Samaj Party	5,495	0.00	0
Bharatiya Krantikari Kammand Party	4,852	0.00	0
Shoshit Samaj Party	4,722	0.00	0
Rashtriya Aikta Manch	4,596	0.00	0
Bahujan Kranti Dal (JAI)	4,525	0.00	0
The Humanist Party of India	4,439	0.00	0
Revolutionary Communist Party of India (Rasik Bhatt)	4,420	0.00	0
Rashtriya Ali Sena	4,371	0.00	0
Sanatan Samaj Party	4,238	0.00	0
Orissa Congress	4,048	0.00	0
Indian Union Muslim League (IUML)	3,763	0.00	0
Rastreeya Praja Parishat	3,688	0.00	0
Bharatiya Minorities Suraksha Mahasangh	3,030	0.00	0
Golden India Party	3,002	0.00	0
Adarsh Lok Dal	2,909	0.00	0
Manava Party	2,903	0.00	0
Krantikari Manuwadi Morcha	2,723	0.00	0
Religion of Man Revolving Political Party of India	2,503	0.00	0
All India Minorities Front	2,480	0.00	0
Bahujan Kranti Dal	2,466	0.00	0
Akhil Bharatiya Ashok Sena	2,392	0.00	0
Republican Party of India (Khobragade)	2,167	0.00	0
Gareebjan Samaj Party	2,009	0.00	0
Andhra Nadu Party	1,915	0.00	0
All India Muslim Forum	1,866	0.00	0
Bahujan Vikas Party	1,833	0.00	0
Pragati Sheel Party	1,828	0.00	0
Rashtriya Janandholan Paksha	1,708	0.00	0
Tamilaga Janata	1,697	0.00	0
Akhil Bharatiya Berozgaar Party	1,609	0.00	0
Prism	1,595	0.00	0
United Citizens Party	1,591	0.00	0
Bharatiya Jan Sabha	1,425	0.00	0
Rashtriya Unnatsheel Das	1,394	0.00	0
Socialist Party (Lohia)	1,321	0.00	0
Akhil Bharatiya Revolutionary Shoshit Samaj Dal	1,277	0.00	0
Agrajan Party	1,269	0.00	0
Ekta Krandi Dal U.P.	1,246	0.00	0
All India Gareeb Congress	1,222	0.00	0
Republican Presidium Party of India	1,215	0.00	0
Akhil Bharatiya Garib Mazdoor Kisan Party	1,199	0.00	0
Indian Bahujan Samajwadi Party	1,162	0.00	0
Bharatiya Parivartan Morcha	1,111	0.00	0
Nagaland Peoples Party	1,066	0.00	0
Bharatiya Momin Front	1,045	0.00	0
Manav Samaj Party	1,036	0.00	0
Rashtriya Mazdoor Ekta Party	946	0.00	0
Hindustan Inqualab Party	883	0.00	0
Jan Samanta Party	828	0.00	0
Bhrishtachar Virodhi Dal	754	0.00	0
Akhil Bharatiya Janata Congress	751	0.00	0
Ambedkarbadi Party	736	0.00	0
Rashtriya Muslim Mujhahid Party	710	0.00	0
Akhil Bharatiya Shivsena Rashtrawadi	703	0.00	0
National Republican Party	694	0.00	0
Hind Kisan Mazdoor Party	614	0.00	0
Akhil Bhartiya Loktantra Party	609	0.00	0
Hind Morcha	590	0.00	0
Punjab Pradesh Vikash Party	576	0.00	0
Uttar Pradesh Republican Party	552	0.00	0
Kranti Dal	501	0.00	0
Bharatiya Jan Jagruti Party	494	0.00	0
Akhil Bharatiya General Labour Party	412	0.00	0
Bharatiya Asht Jan Party	363	0.00	0
Telangana Praja Party	344	0.00	0
Rashtriya Rajdhani Congress Delhi	343	0.00	0
Akhil Bharatiya Rashtriya Azad Hind Party	306	0.00	0
Rashtriya Janta Congress	297	0.00	0
Akhil Bharatiya Ram Rajya Parishad (Prem Vallabh Vyas)	150	0.00	0
Indian Republican Front	118	0.00	0
Independents	8,719,952	2.37	6
Nominated Anglo-Indians			2
Total	368,376,700	100.00	545
Valid votes	368,376,700	98.12	
Invalid/blank votes	7,065,039	1.88	
Total votes	375,441,739	100.00	
Registered voters/turnout	605,880,192	61.97	
Source: ECI

=== By state/union territory and alliance ===
State (# of seats)	Alliance/party			Seats contested	Seats won	Vote %				
Andhra Pradesh (42)	Alliance/party				Congress+		Indian National Congress	42	22	42.79
Andhra Pradesh (42)		Third Front	Telugu Desam Party	35	12	32				
Andhra Pradesh (42)		Third Front	Communist Party Of India (CPI)	3	2	2.6				
Andhra Pradesh (42)		Third Front	Janata Dal	1	1	0.9				
Andhra Pradesh (42)		Third Front	Communist Party of India (Marxist) (CPM)	3	0	2.9				
Andhra Pradesh (42)		NDA	Bharatiya Janata Party (BJP)	38	4	18.3				
Andhra Pradesh (42)		NDA	NTR Telugu Desam Party (Lakshmi Parvathi)	3	0	1.2				
Andhra Pradesh (42)	-	-	All India Majlis-e-Ittehadul Muslimeen	1	1	1.5				
Arunachal Pradesh (2)	-	-	Arunachal Congress	2	2	52.5				
Arunachal Pradesh (2)		Congress+	Indian National Congress	2	0	23.9				
Arunachal Pradesh (2)		NDA	Bharatiya Janata Party (BJP)	2	0	21.7				
Assam (14)		Congress+	Indian National Congress	13	10	39.0				
Assam (14)		NDA	Bharatiya Janata Party (BJP)	14	1	24.5				
Assam (14)	-	-	Asom Gana Parishad	10	0	12.7				
Assam (14)	-	-	Autonomous State Demand Committee	1	1	2.2				
Assam (14)	-	-	United Minorities Front, Assam	3	1	10.46				
Assam (14)	-	-	Independent	45	1	9.5				
Bihar (54)		NDA	Bharatiya Janata Party (BJP)	32	20	24				
Bihar (54)		NDA	Samata Party	21	10	15.77				
Bihar (54)		Congress+	Rashtriya Janata Dal	38	17	26.6				
Bihar (54)		Congress+	Indian National Congress	11	5	6.3				
Bihar (54)		Third Front	Janata Dal	28	1	7.3				
Bihar (54)		Third Front	Communist Party of India (CPI)	15	0	3.4				
Bihar (54)		Third Front	Communist Party of India (Marxist) (CPM)	4	0	0.4				
Bihar (54)		Third Front	All India Forward Bloc (AIFB)	1	0	0				
Bihar (54)	-	-	All India Rashtriya Janata Party	3	1	0.9				
Goa (2)		Congress+	Indian National Congress	2	2	31.6				
Goa (2)		NDA	Bharatiya Janata Party (BJP)	2	0	30				
Gujarat (26)		NDA	Bharatiya Janata Party (BJP)	26	19	48.3				
Gujarat (26)		Congress+	Indian National Congress	26	7	38				
Haryana (10)	-	-	Haryana Lok Dal (Rashtriya)	7	4	25.9				
Haryana (10)		Congress+	Indian National Congress	10	3	26.0				
Haryana (10)		NDA	Haryana Vikas Party	4	1	11.6				
Haryana (10)		NDA	Bharatiya Janata Party (BJP)	6	1	18.9				
Haryana (10)	-	-	Bahujan Samaj Party	3	1	7.7				
Himachal Pradesh (4)		NDA	Bharatiya Janata Party (BJP)	4	3	51.4				
Himachal Pradesh (4)		Congress+	Indian National Congress	4	1	41.9				
Himachal Pradesh (4)	-	-	Himachal Vikas Congress	4	0	3.6				
Jammu & Kashmir (6)	-	-	Jammu & Kashmir National Conference	6	3	36.4				
Jammu & Kashmir (6)		NDA	Bharatiya Janata Party (BJP)	6	2	28.6				
Jammu & Kashmir (6)		Congress+	Indian National Congress	6	1	19.2				
Karnataka (28)		NDA	Bharatiya Janata Party (BJP)	18	13	26.9				
Karnataka (28)		NDA	Lok Shakti	10	3	11.5				
Karnataka (28)		Congress+	Indian National Congress	28	9	36.2				
Karnataka (28)	-	-	Janata Dal	28	3	21.7				
Kerala (20)		Congress+	Indian National Congress	17	8	38.7				
Kerala (20)		Congress+	Kerala Congress (M)	1	1	2.4				
Kerala (20)		Congress+	Muslim League Kerala State Committee	2	2	5				
Kerala (20)		Third Front	Communist Party of India (Marxist) (CPM)	9	6	21				
Kerala (20)		Third Front	Communist Party of India (CPI)	4	2	8.3				
Kerala (20)		Third Front	Revolutionary Socialist Party	1	1	2.7				
Kerala (20)		Third Front	Kerala Congress	1	0	2.2				
Kerala (20)		Third Front	Janata Dal	2	0	3.9				
Kerala (20)		NDA	Bharatiya Janata Party (BJP)	20	0	8				
Madhya Pradesh (40)		NDA	Bharatiya Janata Party (BJP)	40	30	45.7				
Madhya Pradesh (40)		Congress+	Indian National Congress	40	10	39.4				
Madhya Pradesh (40)	-	-	Bahujan Samaj Party	35	0	8.7				
Maharashtra (48)		Congress+	Indian National Congress	41	33	43.6				
Maharashtra (48)		Congress+	Republican Party of India	4	4	4.1				
Maharashtra (48)		Congress+	Samajwadi Party	2	0	1.5				
Maharashtra (48)		NDA	Shiv Sena	22	6	19.7				
Maharashtra (48)		NDA	Bharatiya Janata Party (BJP)	25	4	22.5				
Maharashtra (48)		NDA	Independent	1	0	1.1				
Maharashtra (48)	-	-	Peasants And Workers Party of India	2	1	0.9				
Manipur (2)	-	-	Communist Party Of India (CPI)	2	1	20.5				
Manipur (2)	-	-	Manipur State Congress Party	2	1	25.4				
Manipur (2)		NDA	Bharatiya Janata Party (BJP)	1	0	12.6				
Manipur (2)		NDA	Lok Shakti	1	0	0.2				
Orissa (21)		NDA	Biju Janata Dal	12	9	27.5				
Orissa (21)		NDA	Bharatiya Janata Party (BJP)	9	7	21.2				
Orissa (21)		Congress+	Indian National Congress	21	5	41				
Punjab (13)
Punjab (13)		NDA	Shiromani Akali Dal	8	8	32.9				
Punjab (13)		NDA	Bharatiya Janata Party (BJP)	3	3	11.7				
Punjab (13)		NDA	Janata Dal	1	1	4.2				
Punjab (13)		NDA	Independent	1	1	3.8				
Punjab (13)		Congress+	Indian National Congress	8	0	25.8				
Punjab (13)		Congress+	Communist Party of India (CPI)	1	0	3.4				
Punjab (13)		Congress+	Bahujan Samaj Party	4	0	12.6				
Rajasthan (25)		Congress+	Indian National Congress	25	18	44.5				
Rajasthan (25)		NDA	Bharatiya Janata Party (BJP)	25	5	41.7				
Rajasthan (25)	-	-	All India Indira Congress (Secular)	9	1	1.9				
Rajasthan (25)	-	-	Independent	50	1	3.8				
Tamil Nadu (39)
Tamil Nadu (39)		NDA	All India Anna Dravida Munnetra Kazhagam	22	18	25.9				
Tamil Nadu (39)		NDA	Pattali Makkal Katchi	5	4	6				
Tamil Nadu (39)		NDA	Bharatiya Janata Party (BJP)	5	3	6.9				
Tamil Nadu (39)		NDA	Marumalarchi Dravida Munnetra Kazhagam	5	3	6.3				
Tamil Nadu (39)		NDA	Janata Party	1	1	1.5				
Tamil Nadu (39)		NDA	Independent	1	1	3.62				
Tamil Nadu (39)		Congress+	Indian National Congress	35	0	4.8				
Tamil Nadu (39)		Congress+	MGR Anna Dravida Munnetra Kazhagam	3	0	1.1				
Tamil Nadu (39)		Congress+	United Communist Party Of India	1	0	0				
Tamil Nadu (39)		Third Front	Dravida Munnetra Kazhagam	16	4	18.5				
Tamil Nadu (39)		Third Front	Tamil Maanila Congress (Moopanar)	19	3	19.2				
Tamil Nadu (39)		Third Front	Communist Party Of India (CPI)	2	1	2.5				
Tamil Nadu (39)		Third Front	Communist Party of India (Marxist) (CPM)	2	0	0.6				
Tamil Nadu (39)	-	-	Independent	127	1	2.5				
Uttar Pradesh (85)
Uttar Pradesh (85)		NDA	Bharatiya Janata Party (BJP)	82	57	36.5				
Uttar Pradesh (85)		NDA	Samata Party	2	2	0.8				
Uttar Pradesh (85)		NDA	Shiv Sena	1	0	0.1				
Uttar Pradesh (85)		Congress+	Indian National Congress	76	0	6				
Uttar Pradesh (85)	-	-	Bahujan Samaj Party	85	4	20.9				
Uttar Pradesh (85)	-	-	Samajwadi Party	81	20	28.7				
Uttar Pradesh (85)	-	-	Samajwadi Janata Party (Rashtriya)	1	1	0.5				
Uttar Pradesh (85)	-	-	Independent	491	1	2.8				
West Bengal (42)
West Bengal (42)		Third Front	Communist Party of India (Marxist) (CPM)	32	24	35.4				
West Bengal (42)		Third Front	Communist Party Of India (CPI)	3	3	3.6				
West Bengal (42)		Third Front	Revolutionary Socialist Party (RSP)	4	4	4.5				
West Bengal (42)		Third Front	All India Forward Bloc (AIFB)	3	2	3.3				
West Bengal (42)		NDA	All India Trinamool Congress (AITC)	28	7	24.1				
West Bengal (42)		NDA	Bharatiya Janata Party (BJP)	14	1	10.2				
West Bengal (42)		UPA	Indian National Congress (INC)	39	1	15.2				

== Government formation ==
Political Party	Seats	Alliance
Bharatiya Janata Party	182	National Democratic Alliance
All India Anna Dravida Munnetra Kazhagam	18	National Democratic Alliance
Samata Party	12	National Democratic Alliance
Biju Janata Dal	9	National Democratic Alliance
Shiromani Akali Dal	8	National Democratic Alliance
West Bengal Trinamool Congress	7	National Democratic Alliance
Shiv Sena	6	National Democratic Alliance
Pattali Makkal Katchi	4	National Democratic Alliance
Lok Shakti	3	National Democratic Alliance
Marumalarchi Dravida Munnetra Kazhagam	3	National Democratic Alliance
Janata Dal (out of 6 M.Ps)	2	National Democratic Alliance
Arunachal Congress	2	National Democratic Alliance
Janata Party	1	National Democratic Alliance
Haryana Vikas Party	1	National Democratic Alliance
Sikkim Democratic Front	1	National Democratic Alliance
Tamizhaga Rajiv Congress (As Independent)	1	National Democratic Alliance
Manipur State Congress Party	1	National Democratic Alliance
Bahujan Samaj Morcha (As Independent)	1	National Democratic Alliance
Independent	2	National Democratic Alliance
Telugu Desam Party	12	outside support
Total	276	

== See also ==
- List of members of the 12th Lok Sabha
- Category:1998 Indian general election by state or union territory
