= 1998 elections in India =

1998 Indian elections
- ← 1996 1997 1998 1999 2000 →
- Incumbent Prime Minister: Atal Bihari Vajpayee (NDA)
- Next Lok Sabha: 12th

Lok Sabha elections
- Seats contested: 543

Rajya Sabha elections
- Overall control: Bharatiya Janata Party
- Seats contested: TBD
- Net seat change: TBD

State elections
- States contested: 9
- Net state change: TBD

The 1998 Indian elections were a series of national and sub-national elections which took place in India throughout 1998. The national elections saw the return of the Indian National Congress to power while state results were varied.

== Parliamentary Election result ==
Party	Votes	%	Seats
Indian National Congress	95,111,131	25.82	141
Bharatiya Janata Party	94,266,188	25.59	182
Communist Party of India (Marxist)	18,991,867	5.16	32
Samajwadi Party	18,167,640	4.93	20
Bahujan Samaj Party	17,186,779	4.67	5
Janata Dal	11,930,209	3.24	6
Rashtriya Janata Dal	10,229,971	2.78	17
Telugu Desam Party	10,199,463	2.77	12
West Bengal Trinamool Congress	8,920,583	2.42	7
All India Anna Dravida Munnetra Kazhagam	6,731,550	1.83	18
Shiv Sena	6,528,566	1.77	6
Samata Party	6,491,639	1.76	12
Communist Party of India	6,429,569	1.75	9
Dravida Munnetra Kazhagam	5,308,388	1.44	6
Tamil Maanila Congress	5,169,183	1.40	3
Biju Janata Dal	3,669,825	1.00	9
Shiromani Akali Dal	3,001,769	0.81	8
Lok Shakti	2,548,725	0.69	3
All India Rashtriya Janata Party	2,071,643	0.56	1
Revolutionary Socialist Party	2,032,585	0.55	5
Haryana Lok Dal (Rashtriya)	1,956,087	0.53	4
Marumalarchi Dravida Munnetra Kazhagam	1,602,504	0.44	3
Pattali Makkal Katchi	1,548,976	0.42	4
Republican Party of India	1,351,019	0.37	4
Jharkhand Mukti Morcha	1,324,548	0.36	0
All India Forward Bloc	1,213,965	0.33	2
Samajwadi Janata Party (Rashtriya)	1,181,083	0.32	1
Asom Gana Parishad	1,064,977	0.29	0
Communist Party of India (Marxist–Leninist) Liberation	912,698	0.25	0
Haryana Vikas Party	875,803	0.24	1
Muslim League Kerala State Committee	800,765	0.22	2
Jammu & Kashmir National Conference	784,669	0.21	3
Bharatiya Kisan Kamgar Party	711,080	0.19	0
Apna Dal	562,946	0.15	0
All India Majlis-e-Ittehadul Muslimeen	485,785	0.13	1
All India Indira Congress (Secular)	457,510	0.12	1
Puthiya Tamilagam	446,583	0.12	0
Janata Party	444,305	0.12	1
NTR Telugu Desam Party (Lakshmi Parvathi)	384,211	0.10	0
Karnataka Vikas Party	371,346	0.10	0
United Minorities Front, Assam	357,759	0.10	1
Kerala Congress (M)	356,168	0.10	1
Kerala Congress	327,649	0.09	0
MGR Anna Dravida Munnetra Kazhagam	278,324	0.08	0
Forward Bloc (Socialist)	272,974	0.07	0
Peasants and Workers Party of India	269,609	0.07	1
Marxist Co-ordination Committee	263,901	0.07	0
Shiromani Akali Dal (Simranjit Singh Mann)	248,529	0.07	0
Jharkhand Mukti Morcha (Mardi)	240,897	0.07	0
Bihar Jana Congress	222,371	0.06	0
United Democratic Party	213,924	0.06	0
Gondwana Ganatantra Party	196,662	0.05	0
Manipur State Congress Party	190,358	0.05	1
Autonomous State Demand Committee	184,241	0.05	1
Jharkhand Party (Naren)	181,018	0.05	0
Arunachal Congress	172,496	0.05	2
Ajeya Bharat Party	157,854	0.04	0
United Reservation Movement Council of Assam	151,543	0.04	0
National Loktantrik Party	147,706	0.04	0
United Goans Democratic Party	132,558	0.04	0
Mahabharat People's Party	115,785	0.03	0
Sikkim Democratic Front	102,440	0.03	1
Peoples Democratic Party	92,083	0.02	0
Akhil Bharatiya Sena	90,035	0.02	0
Indian National League	86,697	0.02	0
Himachal Vikas Congress	85,046	0.02	0
Mizo National Front	82,047	0.02	0
Savarn Samaj Party	76,980	0.02	0
Maharashtrawadi Gomantak Party	70,191	0.02	0
Jharkhand Party	63,836	0.02	0
Hill State People's Democratic Party	62,144	0.02	0
Loktantrik Samajwadi Party	43,770	0.01	0
Bahujan Samaj Party (Ambedkar)	43,402	0.01	0
Indian Congress (Socialist)	36,677	0.01	0
Uttarakhand Kranti Dal	30,654	0.01	0
Akhil Bartiya Manav Seva Dal	26,027	0.01	0
National Panthers Party	24,638	0.01	0
Marxist Communist Party of India (S.S. Srivastava)	24,417	0.01	0
Shoshit Samaj Dal	24,303	0.01	0
Proutist Sarva Samaj Samiti	23,029	0.01	0
Chhattisgarh Mukti Morcha	20,928	0.01	0
Jammu and Kashmir Awami League	20,843	0.01	0
Amra Bangali	20,372	0.01	0
Kannada Chalavali Vatal Paksha	19,202	0.01	0
Garo National Council	16,280	0.00	0
Akhil Bharatiya Jan Sangh	14,284	0.00	0
Akhil Bharat Hindu Mahasabha	14,160	0.00	0
Plain Tribals Council of Assam	12,952	0.00	0
Bharatiya Vikash Party	11,881	0.00	0
United Tribal Nationalist Liberation Front	11,287	0.00	0
Rajasthan Vikas Party	11,267	0.00	0
Karnataka Rajya Ryota Sangha	10,064	0.00	0
United Communist Party of India	10,018	0.00	0
Bharti Lok Lehar Party	9,959	0.00	0
Samajwadi Jan Parishad	9,848	0.00	0
Hindustan Janata Party	9,476	0.00	0
Bharatiya Jantantrik Parishad	9,367	0.00	0
Maharashtra Rashtravadi Congress	8,623	0.00	0
Jharkhand People's Party	7,111	0.00	0
Sarvadharam Party (Madhya Pradesh)	6,671	0.00	0
Akhil Bharatiya Rajivwadi Congress (Dubey)	6,455	0.00	0
Bharatiya Rajiv Congress	6,122	0.00	0
Kisan Vikas Party	5,905	0.00	0
Jai Telangana Party	5,847	0.00	0
Akhil Bharatiya Bhrastachar Normoolan Sena	5,718	0.00	0
All India Rajiv Krantikari Congress	5,588	0.00	0
Pragtisheel Manav Samaj Party	5,495	0.00	0
Bharatiya Krantikari Kammand Party	4,852	0.00	0
Shoshit Samaj Party	4,722	0.00	0
Rashtriya Aikta Manch	4,596	0.00	0
Bahujan Kranti Dal (JAI)	4,525	0.00	0
The Humanist Party of India	4,439	0.00	0
Revolutionary Communist Party of India (Rasik Bhatt)	4,420	0.00	0
Rashtriya Ali Sena	4,371	0.00	0
Sanatan Samaj Party	4,238	0.00	0
Orissa Congress	4,048	0.00	0
Indian Union Muslim League (IUML)	3,763	0.00	0
Rastreeya Praja Parishat	3,688	0.00	0
Bharatiya Minorities Suraksha Mahasangh	3,030	0.00	0
Golden India Party	3,002	0.00	0
Adarsh Lok Dal	2,909	0.00	0
Manava Party	2,903	0.00	0
Krantikari Manuwadi Morcha	2,723	0.00	0
Religion of Man Revolving Political Party of India	2,503	0.00	0
All India Minorities Front	2,480	0.00	0
Bahujan Kranti Dal	2,466	0.00	0
Akhil Bharatiya Ashok Sena	2,392	0.00	0
Republican Party of India (Khobragade)	2,167	0.00	0
Gareebjan Samaj Party	2,009	0.00	0
Andhra Nadu Party	1,915	0.00	0
All India Muslim Forum	1,866	0.00	0
Bahujan Vikas Party	1,833	0.00	0
Pragati Sheel Party	1,828	0.00	0
Rashtriya Janandholan Paksha	1,708	0.00	0
Tamilaga Janata	1,697	0.00	0
Akhil Bharatiya Berozgaar Party	1,609	0.00	0
Prism	1,595	0.00	0
United Citizens Party	1,591	0.00	0
Bharatiya Jan Sabha	1,425	0.00	0
Rashtriya Unnatsheel Das	1,394	0.00	0
Socialist Party (Lohia)	1,321	0.00	0
Akhil Bharatiya Revolutionary Shoshit Samaj Dal	1,277	0.00	0
Agrajan Party	1,269	0.00	0
Ekta Krandi Dal U.P.	1,246	0.00	0
All India Gareeb Congress	1,222	0.00	0
Republican Presidium Party of India	1,215	0.00	0
Akhil Bharatiya Garib Mazdoor Kisan Party	1,199	0.00	0
Indian Bahujan Samajwadi Party	1,162	0.00	0
Bharatiya Parivartan Morcha	1,111	0.00	0
Nagaland Peoples Party	1,066	0.00	0
Bharatiya Momin Front	1,045	0.00	0
Manav Samaj Party	1,036	0.00	0
Rashtriya Mazdoor Ekta Party	946	0.00	0
Hindustan Inqualab Party	883	0.00	0
Jan Samanta Party	828	0.00	0
Bhrishtachar Virodhi Dal	754	0.00	0
Akhil Bharatiya Janata Congress	751	0.00	0
Ambedkarbadi Party	736	0.00	0
Rashtriya Muslim Mujhahid Party	710	0.00	0
Akhil Bharatiya Shivsena Rashtrawadi	703	0.00	0
National Republican Party	694	0.00	0
Hind Kisan Mazdoor Party	614	0.00	0
Akhil Bhartiya Loktantra Party	609	0.00	0
Hind Morcha	590	0.00	0
Punjab Pradesh Vikash Party	576	0.00	0
Uttar Pradesh Republican Party	552	0.00	0
Kranti Dal	501	0.00	0
Bharatiya Jan Jagruti Party	494	0.00	0
Akhil Bharatiya General Labour Party	412	0.00	0
Bharatiya Asht Jan Party	363	0.00	0
Telangana Praja Party	344	0.00	0
Rashtriya Rajdhani Congress Delhi	343	0.00	0
Akhil Bharatiya Rashtriya Azad Hind Party	306	0.00	0
Rashtriya Janta Congress	297	0.00	0
Akhil Bharatiya Ram Rajya Parishad (Prem Vallabh Vyas)	150	0.00	0
Indian Republican Front	118	0.00	0
Independents	8,719,952	2.37	6
Nominated Anglo-Indians			2
Total	368,376,700	100.00	545
Valid votes	368,376,700	98.12	
Invalid/blank votes	7,065,039	1.88	
Total votes	375,441,739	100.00	
Registered voters/turnout	605,880,192	61.97	
Source: ECI

== Overall result ==
Polling Date(s)	State	Government before	Chief Minister before	Government after	Elected Chief Minister	Maps
16 February 1998	Tripura	Communist Party of India (Marxist)	Dasarath Deb	Communist Party of India (Marxist)	Manik Sarkar	
16 February 1998	Meghalaya	Indian National Congress	S. C. Marak	Indian National Congress	S. C. Marak	
23 February 1998	Nagaland	Indian National Congress	S. C. Jamir	Indian National Congress	S. C. Jamir	
	Gujarat	Bharatiya Janata Party	Dilip Parikh	Bharatiya Janata Party	Keshubhai Patel	
28 February 1998	Himachal Pradesh	Indian National Congress	Virbhadra Singh	Bharatiya Janata Party	Prem Kumar Dhumal	
25 November 1998	Delhi	Bharatiya Janata Party	Sushma Swaraj	Indian National Congress	Sheila Dikshit	
25 November 1998	Mizoram	Indian National Congress	Lal Thanhawla	Mizo National Front	Zoramthanga	
25 November 1998	Rajasthan	Bharatiya Janata Party	Bhairon Singh Shekhawat	Indian National Congress	Ashok Gehlot	
27 November 1998	Madhya Pradesh	Indian National Congress	Digvijaya Singh	Indian National Congress	Digvijaya Singh	

== Legislative Assembly elections ==
=== Delhi ===
Party	Votes	%	Seats	+/–
Indian National Congress	1,952,071	47.75	52	+38
Bharatiya Janata Party	1,390,689	34.02	15	–34
Janata Dal	73,385	1.80	1	–3
Others	316,346	7.74	0	0
Independents	355,773	8.70	2	–1
Total	4,088,264	100.00	70	0
Valid votes	4,088,264	99.11		
Invalid/blank votes	36,722	0.89		
Total votes	4,124,986	100.00		
Registered voters/turnout	8,420,141	48.99		
Source: ECI

=== Gujarat ===
Party	Votes	%	+/–	Seats
Bharatiya Janata Party	7,300,826	44.88	-4	117
Indian National Congress	5,677,386	34.90	+8	53
AIRJP	1,902,171	11.69		4
Janata Dal	429,283	2.64		4
Independent	854,142	5.25		3
SP	64,913	0.40		1
Bahujan Samaj Party	12,742	0.08	0	0
CPI	10,292	0.06	0	0
SAP	7,512	0.05		–
Republican Party of India	4,642	0.03		–
Shiv Sena	2,800	0.02		–
RJD	1,884	0.01		–
Total	16,268,593	100.00	–	182
Valid votes	16,268,593	95.53		
Invalid/blank votes	761,449	4.47		
Total votes	17,030,042	100.00		
Registered voters/turnout	28,774,443	59.18		
Source: ECI

=== Himachal Pradesh ===
Party	Votes	%	Seats
Indian National Congress	1,110,055	43.51	31
Bharatiya Janata Party	995,482	39.02	31
Himachal Vikas Congress	245,584	9.63	–
Independents and Others	200,248	7.85	1
Total	2,551,369	100.00	63

=== Madhya Pradesh ===
SN	Party	Seats Contested	Seats won	Seats Changed	% Votes
1	Indian National Congress	316	172	-2	40.59
2	Bharatiya Janata Party	320	119	+2	39.28
3	Bahujan Samaj Party	221	11	0	6.15
4	Janata Dal	144	4	+ 3	1.87
5	Samajwadi Party	228	4	+ 4	1.58
6	Gondvana Gantantra Party	81	1	0	0.82
7	Ajeya Bharat Party	78	1	+ 1	0.55
8	Janata Party	14	1	+ 1	0.20
9	Republican Party of India	20	1	+ 1	0.13
10	Independent	320	8	1	6.49
	Total		320		

=== Meghalaya ===
← Summary of the 16 February 1998 Meghalaya Legislative Assembly election results →
Parties and coalitions	Popular vote			Seats	
Parties and coalitions	Votes	%	±pp	Won	+/−
Indian National Congress (INC)	293,346	35.03	0.41 ▲	25	1 ▲
United Democratic Party (UDP)^{[a]}	226,026	26.99	6.48 ▼	20	1 ▼
People's Democratic Movement (PDM)	58,225	6.95		3	
Hill State People's Democratic Party	56,682	6.77		3	
Bharatiya Janata Party (BJP)	41,924	5.01	1.33 ▲	3	3 ▲
Garo National Council (GNC)	17,650	2.11		1	
Hindu Samaj Party (HSP)	4,754	0.57		0	
Communist Party of India (CPI)	1,387	0.17	0.03 ▲	0	Steady
Rashtriya Janata Dal	1,253	0.15		0	
Samajwadi Party	742	0.09		0	
Janata Dal	38	0.0		0	
Independents (IND)	135,356	17.28	1.12 ▼	5	5 ▼
Total	837,383	100.00		60	±0
Source: Election Commission of India

^{a} The UDP was formed in 1997 through a merger of the Hill People's Union (HPU), some members of the Hill State People's Democratic Party (HDP) and the Public Demands Implementation Convention (PDIC). Previous results presented in the table are the combined totals of parties' results from the 1993 election.

=== Mizoram ===
Party	Votes	%	Seats	+/–
Mizo National Front	84,444	24.99	21	▲7
Mizoram People's Conference	69,078	20.44	12	New
Indian National Congress	100,608	29.77	6	▼10
Bharatiya Janata Party	8,448	2.50	0	0
Janata Dal	947	0.28	0	New
Samata Party	940	0.28	0	New
Lok Shakti	774	0.23	0	New
Rashtriya Janata Dal	588	0.17	0	New
Maraland Democratic Front	7,721	2.28	0	New
Mizo National Front (Nationalist)	31,190	9.23	0	New
Independents	33,200	9.82	1	▼9
Total	337,938	100.00	40	0
Valid votes	337,938	99.44		
Invalid/blank votes	1,913	0.56		
Total votes	339,851	100.00		
Registered voters/turnout	445,366	76.31		
Source: ECI

=== Nagaland ===
Party	Votes	%	Seats	+/–
Indian National Congress	103,206	50.73	53	+18
Independents	100,226	49.27	7	0
Total	203,432	100.00	60	0
Valid votes	203,432	98.86		
Invalid/blank votes	2,356	1.14		
Total votes	205,788	100.00		
Registered voters/turnout	260,646	78.95		
Source: ECI

=== Rajasthan ===
Party	Seats	+/–
Indian National Congress	153	▲77
Bharatiya Janata Party	33	▼62
Janata Dal	3	▼3
Bahujan Samaj Party	2	▲2
Rashtriya Janata Dal	1	New
Communist Party of India (Marxist)	1	0
Independents	7	▼14
Total	200	+1

=== Tripura ===
Performance of the political parties in this election
Party	Seats contested	Seats won	No. of votes	% of votes	1993 Seats
Bharatiya Janata Party	60	0	80,272	5.87%	0
Communist Party of India	2	1	18,802	1.38%	0
Communist Party of India (Marxist)	55	38	621,804	45.49%	44
Indian National Congress	45	13	464,171	33.96%	10
Janata Dal	3	0	3,294	0.24%	1
Tripura Upajati Juba Samiti	10	4	98,271	7.19%	1
Revolutionary Socialist Party	2	2	22,526	1.65%	2
Independents	60	2	44,940	3.29%	1
Total	270	60	1,366,966		

== Legislative By-elections ==
=== Jammu and Kashmir ===
Winner, runner-up, voter turnout, and victory margin in every constituency
Assembly Constituency		Turnout	Winner				Runner Up				Margin
#k	Names	%	Candidate	Party	Votes	%	Candidate	Party	Votes	%	Margin
1	Jammu West	33.56%	Ashok Kumar Khajuria	BJP	13,164	54.61%	Ved Kumar	INC	6,967	28.9%	6,197
