= 1996 elections in India =

1996 Indian elections
- ← 1994 1995 1996 1997 1998 →
- Incumbent Prime Minister: H. D. Deve Gowda (NF)
- Next Lok Sabha: 15th

Lok Sabha elections
- Seats contested: 543

Rajya Sabha elections
- Overall control: Indian National Congress
- Seats contested: TBD
- Net seat change: TBD

State elections
- States contested: 8
- Net state change: TBD

Elections in the Republic of India in 1996 included the 1996 Indian general election, elections to eight state legislative assemblies and to seats in the Rajya Sabha.

== General Elections ==
Party	Votes	%	Seats
Indian National Congress	96,455,493	28.80	140
Bharatiya Janata Party	67,950,851	20.29	161
Janata Dal	27,070,340	8.08	46
Communist Party of India (Marxist)	20,496,810	6.12	32
Bahujan Samaj Party	13,453,235	4.02	11
Samajwadi Party	10,989,241	3.28	17
Telugu Desam Party	9,931,826	2.97	16
Tamil Maanila Congress	7,339,982	2.19	20
Samata Party	7,256,086	2.17	8
Dravida Munnetra Kazhagam	7,151,381	2.14	17
Communist Party of India	6,582,263	1.97	12
Shiv Sena	4,989,994	1.49	15
All India Indira Congress (Tiwari)	4,903,070	1.46	4
NTR Telugu Desam Party (Lakshmi Parvathi)	3,249,267	0.97	0
Asom Gana Parishad	2,560,506	0.76	5
Shiromani Akali Dal	2,534,979	0.76	8
All India Anna Dravida Munnetra Kazhagam	2,130,286	0.64	0
Revolutionary Socialist Party	2,105,469	0.63	5
Republican Party of India	1,454,363	0.43	0
Jharkhand Mukti Morcha	1,287,072	0.38	1
All India Forward Bloc	1,279,492	0.38	3
Marumalarchi Dravida Munnetra Kazhagam	1,235,812	0.37	0
Haryana Vikas Party	1,156,322	0.35	3
Communist Party of India (Marxist–Leninist) Liberation	808,065	0.24	0
Indian Union Muslim League	757,316	0.23	2
Janata Party	631,021	0.19	0
Karnataka Congress Party	581,868	0.17	1
Pattali Makkal Katchi	571,910	0.17	0
Peasants and Workers Party of India	437,805	0.13	0
Indian Congress (Socialist)	404,261	0.12	0
Kerala Congress (M)	382,319	0.11	1
All India Majlis-e-Ittehadul Muslimeen	340,070	0.10	1
Shiromani Akali Dal (Simranjit Singh Mann)	339,520	0.10	0
Madhya Pradesh Vikas Congress	337,539	0.10	1
Bharipa Bahujan Mahasangh	329,695	0.10	0
Kerala Congress	320,539	0.10	0
Jharkhand Mukti Morcha (Mardi)	299,055	0.09	0
United Minorities Front, Assam	244,571	0.07	0
Apna Dal	222,669	0.07	0
Autonomous State Demand Committee	180,112	0.05	1
Forward Bloc (Socialist)	172,685	0.05	0
Gujarat Adijati Vikash Paksh	166,003	0.05	0
Maharashtrawadi Gomantak Party	129,220	0.04	1
Sikkim Democratic Front	124,218	0.04	1
Federal Party of Manipur	120,557	0.04	0
Marxist Co-ordination Committee	114,406	0.03	0
Krantikari Samajwadi Manch	113,975	0.03	0
Mizo National Front	111,710	0.03	0
United Goans Democratic Party	109,346	0.03	1
Jharkhand Party (Naren)	102,111	0.03	0
Jammu & Kashmir Panthers Party	99,599	0.03	0
Savarn Samaj Party	84,725	0.03	0
Jharkhand Party	78,907	0.02	0
Majlis Bachao Tahreek	78,335	0.02	0
Nag Vidarbha Andolan Samiti	66,065	0.02	0
Peoples Democratic Party	65,641	0.02	0
Amra Bangali	65,595	0.02	0
Mahabharat People's Party	64,266	0.02	0
Chhattisgarh Mukti Morcha	60,361	0.02	0
Jharkhand People's Party	58,132	0.02	0
Bahujan Samaj Party (Ambedkar)	52,585	0.02	0
Tripura Upajati Juba Samiti	52,300	0.02	0
Akhil Bharatiya Jan Sangh	49,978	0.01	0
Satya Marg Party	48,056	0.01	0
Sikkim Sangram Parishad	42,175	0.01	0
Lok Hit Party	37,127	0.01	0
United Tribal Nationalist Liberation Front	34,803	0.01	0
Pavitra Hindustan Kaazhagam	34,147	0.01	0
Marxist Communist Party of India (S.S. Srivastava)	33,900	0.01	0
Kannada Chalevali Vatal Paksha	31,136	0.01	0
Akhil Bharatiya Bhrastachar Normoolan Sena	30,970	0.01	0
Hul Jharkhand Party	30,220	0.01	0
Bhoomijotak Samooh	29,874	0.01	0
Proutist Sarva Samaj Samiti	26,403	0.01	0
Akhil Bhartiya Loktantra Party	25,131	0.01	0
Republican Party of India (Athawale)	22,640	0.01	0
Uttar Pradesh Republican Party	22,515	0.01	0
Anaithinthiya Thamizhaga Munnetra Kazhag	19,394	0.01	0
New India Party	19,135	0.01	0
Bhatiya Krishi Udyog Sangh	17,744	0.01	0
Indian National League	15,954	0.00	0
Jan Parishad	15,112	0.00	0
Rashtriya Nayay Party	13,160	0.00	0
Lokdal	11,957	0.00	0
Shoshit Samaj Dal	11,937	0.00	0
Bahujan Kranti Dal (JAI)	11,735	0.00	0
Mahakushal Vikas Party	11,152	0.00	0
Jansatta Party	10,901	0.00	0
Bharatiya Minorities Suraksha Mahasangh	10,657	0.00	0
Republican Party of India (Democratic)	10,072	0.00	0
Gondwana Ganatantra Party	9,985	0.00	0
Pragtisheel Manav Samaj Party	9,974	0.00	0
Akhil Bharatiya Berozgaar Party	9,813	0.00	0
Janhit Morcha	9,404	0.00	0
Hindustan Janata Party	9,208	0.00	0
Rashtriya Samajwadi Party 'pragatisheel'	8,779	0.00	0
Lok Party	8,758	0.00	0
Pachim Banga Rajya Muslim League	8,624	0.00	0
Republican Party of India (Khobragade)	8,491	0.00	0
Akhil Bhartiya Janata Vikas Party	7,726	0.00	0
Arya Sabha	7,563	0.00	0
Bharatiya Jan Sabha	7,338	0.00	0
Republican Presidium Party of India	7,298	0.00	0
Bahujan Kranti Dal	6,968	0.00	0
Political Party of National Management Service	6,667	0.00	0
Rashtriya Surajya Parishad	6,000	0.00	0
Samajwadi Janata Party (Maharashtra)	5,784	0.00	0
Maharashtra Pradesh Krantikari Party	5,765	0.00	0
Akhil Bartiya Manav Seva Dal	5,673	0.00	0
National Republican Party	5,271	0.00	0
Indian Democratic Party	5,084	0.00	0
Bharatiya Lok Tantrik Mazdoor Dal	5,075	0.00	0
Surajya Party	4,917	0.00	0
Hindu Mahasabha	4,720	0.00	0
Rashtriya Aikta Manch	4,574	0.00	0
National Democratic Peoples Front	4,462	0.00	0
Bolshevik Party of India	4,345	0.00	0
Bharatiya Lok Panchayat	4,018	0.00	0
Bharatiya Rashtriya Party	3,724	0.00	0
Rashtriya Kisan Party	3,635	0.00	0
Akhil Bharatiya Mahasand Sarvahara Krantikari Party	3,552	0.00	0
Bharatiya Labour Party	3,550	0.00	0
Rashtriya Unnatsheel Das	3,476	0.00	0
Rashtriya Samdarshi Party	3,360	0.00	0
Vijeta Party	3,328	0.00	0
Satyayug Party	3,319	0.00	0
Bharatiya Rashtriya Morcha	3,181	0.00	0
Rashtriya Mazdoor Ekta Party	3,176	0.00	0
Marxist Engelist Leninist Proletariat Health Commune	3,155	0.00	0
Akhil Bharatiya Rashtriya Azad Hind Party	3,152	0.00	0
Bahujan Samaj Party (Raj Bahadur)	3,114	0.00	0
Socialist Party (Lohia)	3,006	0.00	0
Kannada Paksha	2,883	0.00	0
Bharatiya Manav Raksha Dal	2,796	0.00	0
Akhil Bharatiya Dalit Utthan Party	2,654	0.00	0
Akhil Bharatiya Desh Bhakt Morcha	2,295	0.00	0
Indian Secular Congress	2,136	0.00	0
Bira Oriya Party	2,088	0.00	0
Republican Party of India (Sivaraj)	2,081	0.00	0
Bharathiya Nethaji Party	2,024	0.00	0
Bharatiya Rajiv Congress	1,967	0.00	0
Bharatiya Jantantrik Parishad	1,867	0.00	0
Ekta Samaj Party	1,852	0.00	0
Congress Of People	1,850	0.00	0
Revolutionary Communist Party Of India (Rasik Bhatt)	1,803	0.00	0
Bhartiya Ekta Party	1,801	0.00	0
Shoshit Samaj Party	1,684	0.00	0
Samajwadi Dal	1,637	0.00	0
Akhil Bharatiya Shivsena Rashtrawadi	1,477	0.00	0
Bharatiya Kranti Sena	1,439	0.00	0
Indian Democratic People's Party	1,438	0.00	0
Ekta Krandi Dal U.P.	1,409	0.00	0
Indian Bahujan Samajwadi Party	1,376	0.00	0
Sarvadharam Party (Madhya Pradesh)	1,327	0.00	0
People's Democratic League of India	1,276	0.00	0
Punjab Vikas Party (Punjab)	1,185	0.00	0
Desh Bhakt Party	1,148	0.00	0
Sabjan Party	1,120	0.00	0
Akhil Bharatiya Lok Tantrik Alp-Sankhyak Jan Morcha	1,111	0.00	0
Kisan Vyawasayee Mazdoor Party	1,056	0.00	0
Pratap Shiv Sena	1,049	0.00	0
Adarsh Lok Dal	1,037	0.00	0
Gareebjan Samaj Party	962	0.00	0
Akhil Bharatiya Dharmnirpeksh Dal	894	0.00	0
All India Azad Hind Mazdur & Jan Kalyan Party	883	0.00	0
Bahujan Loktantrik Party	857	0.00	0
Socialist Party (Ramakant Pandey)	848	0.00	0
Manav Sewa Sangh	841	0.00	0
Bharatiya Samajwadi Vikas Party	805	0.00	0
Akhil Bhartiya Rajarya Sabha	787	0.00	0
Indian Union Muslim League (IUML)	786	0.00	0
Akhil Bharatiya Ram Rajya Parishad	724	0.00	0
Ambedkar Kranti Dal	667	0.00	0
Bhartiya Jan Kisan Party	633	0.00	0
Mahabharath Mahajan Sabha	572	0.00	0
Bharatiya Samaj Sangathan Morcha	535	0.00	0
Rashtriya Bharat Nav Nirman Sangathan	528	0.00	0
Samajik Kranti Dal	522	0.00	0
Rashtriya Krantikari Dal	520	0.00	0
Bharat Jan Party	505	0.00	0
Hind National Party	496	0.00	0
Sachet Bharat Party	470	0.00	0
Bhartiya Azad Party	457	0.00	0
Bhrishtachar Virodhi Dal	434	0.00	0
Akhil Bharatiya Ram Rajya Parishad (Prem Ballabh Vyas)	428	0.00	0
Tamil Nadu Hindu Vellalar Youth Kazhagam	422	0.00	0
Pragati Sheel Party	407	0.00	0
Socialist League of India	384	0.00	0
United Indian Democratic Council	374	0.00	0
Rashtriya Samaj Sevak Dal	348	0.00	0
Akhil Bhartiya Kisan Mazdoor Morcha	345	0.00	0
Hindu Praja Party	332	0.00	0
Janata Kranti Congress	324	0.00	0
Mukt Bharat	295	0.00	0
Jan Swarajya Party	278	0.00	0
Gujarat Janta Parishad	266	0.00	0
Bharat Pensioner's Front	231	0.00	0
Bharatiya Parivartan Morcha	231	0.00	0
All India Democratic People Federation	195	0.00	0
Akhil Bharatiya Jagrook Nagrik Dal	176	0.00	0
Federation of Sabhas	142	0.00	0
Hind Kisan Mazdoor Party	131	0.00	0
Poorvanchal Rashtriya Congress	124	0.00	0
Kranti Dal	112	0.00	0
Jan Ekata Morcha	94	0.00	0
Bharatiya Sarvkalyan Krantidal	89	0.00	0
Manav Samaj Party	74	0.00	0
Labour Party of India (V.V. Prasad)	68	0.00	0
Bharatiya Rashtrawadi Dal	53	0.00	0
Independents	21,041,557	6.28	9
Nominated Anglo-Indians			2
Total	334,873,286	100.00	545
Valid votes	334,873,286	97.54	
Invalid/blank votes	8,434,804	2.46	
Total votes	343,308,090	100.00	
Registered voters/turnout	592,572,288	57.94	
Source: ECI

== Results ==
Date(s)	State	Government before election	Chief Minister before election	Government after election	Chief Minister after election	Maps
27 April 1996	Assam	Indian National Congress	Hiteswar Saikia	Asom Gana Parishad	Prafulla Kumar Mahanta	
	Kerala	Indian National Congress	A. K. Antony	Communist Party of India (Marxist)	E. K. Nayanar	
27 April 1996	Pondicherry	Indian National Congress	V. Vaithilingam	Dravida Munnetra Kazhagam	R. V. Janakiraman	
27 April 1996	Pondicherry	All India Anna Dravida Munnetra Kazhagam	V. Vaithilingam	Tamil Maanila Congress	R. V. Janakiraman	
2 May 1996	Tamil Nadu	All India Anna Dravida Munnetra Kazhagam	J. Jayalalithaa	Dravida Munnetra Kazhagam	M. Karunanidhi	
13 May 1996	West Bengal	Communist Party of India (Marxist)	Jyoti Basu	Communist Party of India (Marxist)	Jyoti Basu	
	Haryana	Indian National Congress	Bhajan Lal Bishnoi	Haryana Vikas Party	Bansi Lal	
	Haryana	Indian National Congress	Bhajan Lal Bishnoi	Bhartiya Janata Party	Bansi Lal	
17 September 1996	Jammu and Kashmir	President's Rule		Jammu and Kashmir National Conference	Farooq Abdullah	
30 September and 7 October 1996	Uttar Pradesh	President's Rule		Bahujan Samaj Party	Mayawati	

== Legislative Assembly elections ==
=== Assam ===
Party	Votes	%	Seats	+/–
Indian National Congress	2,778,627	30.56	34	▼32
Asom Gana Parishad	2,700,934	29.70	59	▲40
Bharatiya Janata Party	946,236	10.41	4	▼6
All India Indira Congress (Tiwari)	337,668	3.71	2	New
Autonomous State Demand Committee	179,877	1.98	5	▲1
Communist Party of India	177,750	1.95	3	▼1
Communist Party of India (Marxist)	176,721	1.94	2	0
United Minorities Front, Assam	105,408	1.16	2	New
Others	105,471	1.16	0	0
Independents	1,584,109	17.42	11	▼4
Total	9,092,801	100.00	122	▼4
Valid votes	9,092,801	95.07		
Invalid/blank votes	471,632	4.93		
Total votes	9,564,433	100.00		
Registered voters/turnout	12,119,125	78.92		
Source: ECI

=== Haryana ===
Summary of results of the Haryana Legislative Assembly election, 1996
Political Party	No. of candidates	No. of elected	Number of Votes	% of Votes
Haryana Vikas Party	65	33	17,16,572	22.7%
Samta Party	89	24	15,57,914	20.6%
Bharatiya Janata Party	25	11	6,72,558	8.9%
Independent	2022	10	11,73,533	15.5%
Indian National Congress	90	9	15,76,882	20.8%
All India Indira Congress (Tiwari)	62	3	2,42,638	3.2%

=== Jammu and Kashmir ===
Party	Votes	%	Seats	+/–
Jammu & Kashmir National Conference	863,612	34.78	57	▲17
Indian National Congress	496,628	20.00	7	▼19
Bharatiya Janata Party	301,238	12.13	8	▲6
Janata Dal	269,984	10.87	5	New
Bahujan Samaj Party	159,690	6.43	4	New
Jammu and Kashmir Awami League	60,437	2.43	1	New
Jammu and Kashmir National Panthers Party	55,885	2.25	1	▲1
Communist Party of India (Marxist)	23,774	0.96	1	▲1
All India Indira Congress (Tiwari)	17,473	0.70	1	New
Others	3,090	0.12	0	0
Independents	231,111	9.31	2	▼6
Total	2,482,922	100.00	87	▲11
Valid votes	2,482,922	96.74		
Invalid/blank votes	83,734	3.26		
Total votes	2,566,656	100.00		
Registered voters/turnout	4,761,095	53.91		
Source: ECI

In the 1996 assembly elections, 14 women contested, 10 of whom lost their deposits, while 2 were elected. National Conference won 57 out of 86 seats. BSP contested first time on 29 seats in the state and won 4 seats. BJP rose from two seats in 1987 to 8 seats in 1996.

The National Conference won 57 out of 86 seats. The BSP contested first time on 29 seats in the state and won 4 seats. The BJP rose from two seats in 1987 to 8 seats.

=== Kerala ===
Party-wise vote share of 1996 Kerala Assembly Elections
Sl.No:	Party	Contested	Won	Popular Votes	Share (%)
National Parties
1	All India Indira Congress (Tiwari) (AIIC(T))	8	0	8,549	0.06
2	Bharatiya Janata Party (BJP)	123	0	7,81,090	5.48
3	Communist Party of India (CPI)	22	18	10,86,350	7.62
4	Communist Party of India (Marxist) (CPI(M))	62	40	30,78,723	21.59
5	Indian National Congress	94	37	43,40,717	30.43
6	Janata Dal (JD)	13	4	5,87,716	4.12
7	Janata Party (JP)	21	0	8,027	0.06
State Parties
1	Bahujan Samaj Party (BSP)	12	0	17,872	0.13
2	All India Forward Bloc (FBL)	6	0	2,522	0.02
3	Indian Congress (Socialist) (IC(S))	9	3	3,55,755	2.49
4	Kerala Congress (KEC)	10	6	4,42,421	3.10
5	Kerala Congress (Mani) (KCM)	10	5	4,53,614	3.18
6	Indian Union Muslim League (IUML)	22	13	10,25,556	7.19
7	Revolutionary Socialist Party (RSP)	6	5	2,94,744	2.07
8	Shiv Sena (SHS)	16	0	4,445	0.03
Unrecognised Parties
1	Bharatiya Labour Party (BLP)	1	0	3,632	0.03
2	Communist Marxist Party (CMPKSC)	3	0	69,934	0.49
3	Indian Labour Congress (ILC)	1	0	630	0.00
4	Indian National League (INL)	3	0	139775	0.89
5	Janadhipatya Samrakshana Samithi (JSS)	4	1	1,82,210	1.28
6	Kerala Congress (B) (KC(B))	2	1	91,968	0.64
7	Kerala Congress (Joseph) (KCJ)	10	2	455748	2.9
8	Peoples Democratic Party (PDP)	50	0	1,02,226	0.06
9	Social Action Party (SAP)	9	0	1,916	0.19
10	Socialist Labour Action Party (SLAP)	1	0	58	0.07
11	Samajwadi Jan Parishad (SWJP)	1	0	167	0.00
Others/ Independents		672	5	10,95,761	7.68
Total		1,201	140	14,262,692	100

=== Puducherry ===
Party	Votes	%	Seats	+/–
Indian National Congress	116,618	25.34	9	▼6
Dravida Munnetra Kazhagam	105,392	22.90	7	▲3
All India Anna Dravida Munnetra Kazhagam	57,678	12.53	3	▲3
Tamil Maanila Congress	42,485	9.23	5	New
Communist Party of India	29,964	6.51	2	▲1
Janata Dal	20,360	4.42	1	0
Pattali Makkal Katchi	11,544	2.51	1	New
Others	29,126	6.33	0	0
Independents	47,126	10.24	2	▼1
Total	460,293	100.00	30	0
Valid votes	460,293	96.43		
Invalid/blank votes	17,036	3.57		
Total votes	477,329	100.00		
Registered voters/turnout	633,635	75.33		
Source: ECI

=== Tamil Nadu ===
Summary of the 1996 June Tamil Nadu Legislative Assembly election results
Alliance/Party	Seats won	Change	Popular Vote	Vote %	Adj. %^{‡}
DMK+ Alliance	221	+214	14,600,748	53.77%	
DMK	173	+171	11,423,380	42.07%	54.04%
TMC(M)	39	+39	2,526,474	9.3%	55.21%
CPI	8	+7	575,570	2.12%	42.95%
AIFB	1	+1	75,324	0.28%	76.18%
AIADMK+ alliance	4	-221	7,354,723	27.08%	
AIADMK	4	-160	5,831,383	21.47%	29.24%
INC	0	-60	1,523,340	5.61%	21.09%
MDMK+ alliance	2	0	2,143,141	7.89%	
MDMK	0	0	1,569,168	5.78%	7.6%
CPI(M)	1	0	456,712	1.68%	9.57%
JD	1	0	117,801	0.43%	7.31%
PMK+ Alliance	4	+3	1,252,275	4.61%	
PMK	4	+3	1,042,333	3.84%	7.61%
AIIC(T)	0	0	209,942	0.77%	4.23%
Others	3	+1	1,662,926	6.12%	
BJP	1	+1	490,453	1.81%	2.93%
JP	1	+1	150,134	0.55%	2.51%
IND	1	0	1,022,339	3.76%	3.8%
Total	234	–	27,154,721	100%	

=== Uttar Pradesh ===
Party	Contested	Won	Votes	%	Seats change
Bharatiya Janata Party	414	174	18,028,820	32.5%	▼3
Samajwadi Party	281	110	12,085,226	21.8%	▲1
Bahujan Samaj Party	296	67	10,890,716	19.6%	
Indian National Congress	126	33	4,626,663	8.3%	▲5
Independent	2031	13	3,615,932	6.5%	▲5
Bharatiya Kisan Kamgar Party	38	8	1,065,730	1.9%	▲8 (new)
Janata Dal	54	7	1,421,528	2.6%	▼20
Communist Party of India (Marxist)	11	4	1,421,528	0.8%	▲3
All India Indira Congress (Tiwari)	37	4	735,327	1.3%	▲4 (new)
Samta Party	9	2	221,866	0.4%	▲2 (new)
Communist Party of India	15	1	327,231	0.6%	▼2
Samajwadi Janata Party (Rashtriya)	77	1	325,787	0.6%	▲1 (new)

=== West Bengal ===
Party		Candidates	Seats	Votes	%
Left Front and allies	Communist Party of India (Marxist); Including candidates from Samajwadi Party contesting on CPI(M) tickets.	213	153	13,670,198	37.16
Left Front and allies	All India Forward Bloc	34	21	1,912,183	5.20
Left Front and allies	Revolutionary Socialist Party	23	18	1,367,439	3.72
Left Front and allies	Communist Party of India	12	6	642,993	1.75
Left Front and allies	Marxist Forward Bloc	2	2	150,099	0.41
Left Front and allies	Democratic Socialist Party (Prabodh Chandra)	2	2	129,367	0.35
Left Front and allies	Revolutionary Communist Party of India (Rasik Bhatt)	2	0	105,366	0.29
Left Front and allies	Biplobi Bangla Congress	1	1	60,453	0.16
Left Front and allies	Janata Dal	5	0	105,697	0.29
Indian National Congress		288	82	14,523,964	39.48
Bharatiya Janata Party		292	0	2,372,480	6.45
Gorkha National Liberation Front		3	3	161,498	0.44
Jharkhand Party (Naren)		8	1	145,503	0.40
Jharkhand Mukti Morcha		26	0	134,436	0.37
Forward Bloc (Socialist)		20	1	123,316	0.34
Bahujan Samaj Party		48	0	67,853	0.18
Communist Party of India (Marxist–Leninist) Liberation		30	0	47,206	0.13
Akhil Bharatiya Gorkha League		3	0	43,261	0.12
All India Indira Congress (Tiwari)		29	0	20,555	0.06
Muslim League		20	0	19,221	0.05
Amra Bangalee		46	0	17,330	0.05
Jharkhand Mukti Morcha (Mardi)		5	0	11,593	0.03
Pachim Banga Rajya Muslim League		5	0	5,359	0.01
Indian National League		7	0	4,480	0.01
Social Action Party		16	0	4,476	0.01
Jharkhand Party		5	0	3,533	0.01
Hul Jharkhand Party		2	0	3,309	0.01
Bharatiya Minorities Suraksha Mahasangh		2	0	2,448	0.01
Samajwadi Jan Parishad		2	0	1,218	0.00
Indian Democratic People's Party		3	0	515	0.00
All India Christian Democratic and Backward People's Party		1	0	392	0.00
Indian Union Muslim League		1	0	251	0.00
Akhil Bharatiya Hindu Mahasabha		2	0	178	0.00
Akhil Bharatiya Jan Sangh		1	0	49	0.00
Independents		844	4	898,677	2.44
Total		2,035	294	36,788,753	100
Source: Election Commission of India
