= 1999 elections in India =

1999 Indian elections
- ← 1997 1998 1999 2000 2001 →
- Incumbent Prime Minister: Atal Bihari Vajpayee (NDA)
- Next Lok Sabha: 13th

Lok Sabha elections
- Seats contested: 543

Rajya Sabha elections
- Overall control: Bharatiya Janata Party
- Seats contested: TBD
- Net seat change: TBD

State elections
- States contested: 6
- Net state change: TBD

The 1999 elections in India include the 1999 Indian general election, Rajya Sabha election and various State Assembly elections.

== General election ==
Party	Votes	%	Seats
Indian National Congress	103,120,330	28.30	114
Bharatiya Janata Party	86,562,209	23.75	182
Communist Party of India (Marxist)	19,695,767	5.40	33
Bahujan Samaj Party	15,175,845	4.16	14
Samajwadi Party	13,717,021	3.76	26
Telugu Desam Party	13,297,370	3.65	29
Janata Dal (United)	11,282,084	3.10	21
Rashtriya Janata Dal	10,150,492	2.79	7
All India Trinamool Congress	9,363,785	2.57	8
Nationalist Congress Party	8,260,311	2.27	8
All India Anna Dravida Munnetra Kazhagam	7,046,953	1.93	10
Dravida Munnetra Kazhagam	6,298,832	1.73	12
Shiv Sena	5,672,412	1.56	15
Communist Party of India	5,395,119	1.48	4
Biju Janata Dal	4,378,536	1.20	10
Janata Dal (Secular)	3,332,702	0.91	1
Pattali Makkal Katchi	2,377,741	0.65	5
Shiromani Akali Dal	2,502,949	0.69	2
Tamil Maanila Congress	2,058,636	0.56	0
Indian National Lok Dal	2,002,700	0.55	5
Marumalarchi Dravida Munnetra Kazhagam	1,620,527	0.44	4
Revolutionary Socialist Party	1,500,817	0.41	3
Rashtriya Lok Dal	1,364,030	0.37	2
All India Forward Bloc	1,288,060	0.35	2
Communist Party of India (Marxist–Leninist) Liberation	1,220,698	0.33	1
Asom Gana Parishad	1,182,061	0.32	0
Jharkhand Mukti Morcha	974,609	0.27	0
Muslim League Kerala State Committee	833,562	0.23	2
Akhil Bharatiya Loktantrik Congress	818,713	0.22	2
Bharipa Bahujan Mahasangh	692,559	0.19	1
Apna Dal	848,662	0.23	0
Bihar People's Party	607,810	0.17	0
Puthiya Tamilagam	568,196	0.16	0
Jammu & Kashmir National Conference	454,481	0.12	4
All India Majlis-e-Ittehadul Muslimeen	448,165	0.12	1
MGR Anna Dravida Munnetra Kazhagam	396,216	0.11	1
Kerala Congress	365,313	0.10	1
Kerala Congress (M)	357,402	0.10	1
Shiromani Akali Dal (Simranjit Singh Mann)	298,846	0.08	1
Samajwadi Janata Party (Rashtriya)	297,337	0.08	1
Peasants and Workers Party of India	282,583	0.08	1
Himachal Vikas Congress	264,002	0.07	1
Manipur State Congress Party	222,417	0.06	1
Republican Party of India	505,664	0.14	0
Ajeya Bharat Party	430,275	0.12	0
Sarb Hind Shiromani Akali Dal	406,421	0.11	0
Marxist Co-ordination Committee	351,839	0.10	0
Tamizhaga Rajiv Congress	338,278	0.09	0
United Reservation Movement Council of Assam	246,942	0.07	0
Anna Telugu Desam Party	244,045	0.07	0
Democratic Bahujan Samaj Morcha	236,962	0.07	0
Haryana Vikas Party	188,731	0.05	0
Sikkim Democratic Front	107,828	0.03	1
Gondwana Ganatantra Party	180,804	0.05	0
People's Democratic Front	172,434	0.05	0
Janata Party	167,649	0.05	0
Jharkhand Mukti Morcha (Ulgulan)	154,433	0.04	0
Mahabharat People's Party	145,192	0.04	0
National Loktantrik Party	136,385	0.04	0
Marxist Communist Party of India (S.S. Srivastava)	120,220	0.03	0
United Democratic Party	107,197	0.03	0
Jharkhand Party (Naren)	101,441	0.03	0
Sikkim Sangram Parishad	86,466	0.02	0
Kannada Chalavali Vatal Paksha	73,012	0.02	0
Sadbhavana Party	71,279	0.02	0
Arunachal Congress	70,760	0.02	0
NTR Telugu Desam Party (Lakshmi Parvathi)	61,635	0.02	0
Jharkhand Party	57,676	0.02	0
Champaran Vikas Party	56,561	0.02	0
Akhil Bharatiya Sena	56,249	0.02	0
United Minorities Front, Assam	53,661	0.01	0
Lok Shakti	40,997	0.01	0
Bharatiya Republican Paksha	40,636	0.01	0
Hill State People's Democratic Party	40,301	0.01	0
Bahujan Samaj Party (Ambedkar)	39,494	0.01	0
Pragatisheel Manav Samaj Party	36,920	0.01	0
Bharatiya Jan Congress	34,552	0.01	0
People's Democratic Movement	33,164	0.01	0
Bhartiya Jana Congress (Rashtriya)	32,871	0.01	0
Pyramid Party of India	31,699	0.01	0
Socialist Republican Party	30,779	0.01	0
Federal Party of Manipur	30,039	0.01	0
Jammu and Kashmir Awami League	28,889	0.01	0
Amra Bangali	25,408	0.01	0
Tamil Desiyak Katchi	25,209	0.01	0
Loktantrik Samajwadi Party	23,630	0.01	0
Indian Union Muslim League (IUML)	20,523	0.01	0
Bharatiya Jana Sangh	19,596	0.01	0
National Minorities Party	19,344	0.01	0
Shoshit Samaj Dal	19,330	0.01	0
Jammu and Kashmir National Panthers Party	15,888	0.00	0
Chhattisgarh Mukti Morcha	15,526	0.00	0
Uttarakhand Kranti Dal	14,302	0.00	0
Akhil Bharat Hindu Mahasabha	14,157	0.00	0
Republican Party of India (Athawale)	14,098	0.00	0
Majlis Bachao Tahreek	13,461	0.00	0
Sirpanch Samaj Party	13,437	0.00	0
Chhattisgarhi Samaj Party	13,097	0.00	0
Parivartan Samaj Party	12,820	0.00	0
United Goans Democratic Party	11,153	0.00	0
Jan Satta Party	11,024	0.00	0
Savarn Samaj Party	10,906	0.00	0
All India Muslim Forum	10,010	0.00	0
Maraland Democratic Front	8,444	0.00	0
United Tribal Nationalists Liberation Front	8,429	0.00	0
United Bodo Nationalist Liberation Front	7,611	0.00	0
Bharatiya Samaj Dal	7,607	0.00	0
Ambedkar Samaj Party	7,260	0.00	0
Akhil Bharatiya Berozgaar Party	7,134	0.00	0
Akhil Bartiya Manav Seva Dal	6,761	0.00	0
Rajasthan Vikash Party	6,258	0.00	0
Awami Party	5,050	0.00	0
All India Gareeb Congress	4,861	0.00	0
Gareebjan Samaj Party	4,725	0.00	0
Garo National Council	4,561	0.00	0
Humanist Party of India	4,192	0.00	0
Rashtriya Unnatsheel Das	4,104	0.00	0
Shoshit Samaj Party	4,080	0.00	0
Bharatiya Naujawan Dal	3,895	0.00	0
Dhiravida Thelgar Munnetra Kalagam	3,748	0.00	0
Maharashtra Rashtravadi Congress	3,579	0.00	0
Maharashtra Pradesh Krantikari Party	3,571	0.00	0
Bira Oriya Party	3,120	0.00	0
Bahujan Kranti Dal (JAI)	3,090	0.00	0
All India Rajiv Krantikari Congress	2,993	0.00	0
Sanatan Samaj Party	2,932	0.00	0
Bhartiya Lok Kalyan Dal	2,896	0.00	0
Bharatiya Berozgar Mazdoor Kisan Dal	2,706	0.00	0
Tharasu Makkal Mandram	2,675	0.00	0
Gujarat Yuva Vikas Party	2,217	0.00	0
Bharatiya Minorities Suraksha Mahasangh	2,151	0.00	0
Akhil Bhartiya Janata Vikas Party	1,981	0.00	0
Bharat Dal	1,832	0.00	0
Hind Vikas Party	1,641	0.00	0
Tamil Nadu Peasants and Workers Party	1,631	0.00	0
Ephraim Union	1,578	0.00	0
National Organisation Congress	1,566	0.00	0
Manav Kalyan Sangh Dal	1,517	0.00	0
Revolutionary Communist Party of India (Rasik Bhatt)	1,516	0.00	0
All J & K Peoples Patriotic Front	1,500	0.00	0
Kamjor Varg Sangh, Bihar	1,481	0.00	0
United Citizens Party	1,414	0.00	0
Rashtriya Sawarn Dal	1,407	0.00	0
Goa Vikas Party	1,407	0.00	0
Akhil Bharatiya Manav Adhikar Dal	1,333	0.00	0
Akhil Bhartiya Loktantra Party	1,265	0.00	0
Labour and Job Seeker's Party of India	1,227	0.00	0
Bahujan Kranti Dal	1,218	0.00	0
Secular Party of India	1,180	0.00	0
Rashtriya Aikta Manch	1,169	0.00	0
Gandhiwadi Rashtriya Congress	1,163	0.00	0
Pragati Sheel Party	858	0.00	0
Bharat Nav Jyoti Sangh	806	0.00	0
All India Minorities Front	805	0.00	0
Bahujan Ekta Party (R)	783	0.00	0
Bharatiya Momin Front	737	0.00	0
Indian National Green Party	594	0.00	0
Bharatiya Jan Vikas Party	571	0.00	0
Ambedkarbadi Party	543	0.00	0
Bharatiya Parivartan Morcha	508	0.00	0
Rashtriya Mazdoor Ekta Party	437	0.00	0
Christian Mannetra Kazhagam	385	0.00	0
Bharatha Makkal Congress	384	0.00	0
Rashtriya Dharmanirpeksha Nava Bharat Party	384	0.00	0
Kranti Dal	344	0.00	0
Bharatiya Muhabbat Party (All India)	338	0.00	0
Akhil Bharatiya Shivsena Rashtrawadi	244	0.00	0
National Congress Of Youth	179	0.00	0
Desh Bhakt Party	173	0.00	0
Independents	9,996,386	2.74	6
Nominated Anglo-Indians			2
Total	364,437,294	100.00	545
Valid votes	364,437,294	98.05	
Invalid/blank votes	7,231,810	1.95	
Total votes	371,669,104	100.00	
Registered voters/turnout	619,536,847	59.99	
Source: ECI

=== State and Alliance wise ===
State (# of seats)	Alliance/Party				Seats Contested	Seats won	% of votes				
Andhra Pradesh(42)	Alliance/Party					NDA		Telugu Desam Party	34	29	39.85
Andhra Pradesh(42)		Bharatiya Janata Party (BJP)	8	7		NDA	9.90				
Andhra Pradesh(42)		Congress+		Indian National Congress	42	5	42.79				
Andhra Pradesh(42)		Third Front		Communist Party of India (Marxist) (CPM)	7	0	1.4				
Andhra Pradesh(42)		Third Front		Communist Party Of India (CPI)	6	0	1.3				
Andhra Pradesh(42)	-	-		All India Majlis-e-Ittehadul Muslimeen	1	1	6.05				
Arunachal Pradesh(2)		Congress+		Indian National Congress	2	2	56.92				
Arunachal Pradesh(2)		NDA		Arunachal Congress	1	0	16.62				
Arunachal Pradesh(2)		NDA		Bharatiya Janata Party (BJP)	1	0	16.30				
Arunachal Pradesh(2)	-	-		Nationalist Congress Party	1	0	7.77				
Assam(14)		Congress+		Indian National Congress	14	10	38.42				
Assam(14)		NDA		Bharatiya Janata Party (BJP)	12	2	29.84				
Assam(14)		Third Front		Asom Gana Parishad	8	0	11.92				
Assam(14)		Third Front		Communist Party of India (Marxist) (CPM)	2	0	1.8				
Assam(14)		Third Front		Communist Party of India (CPI)	1	0	0.6				
Assam(14)	-	-		Communist Party of India (Marxist–Leninist) Liberation	3	1	10.46				
Assam(14)	-	-		Independent	44	1	9.36				
Bihar(54)		NDA		Bharatiya Janata Party (BJP)	29	23	23.01				
Bihar(54)		NDA		Janata Dal (United)	23	18	20.77				
Bihar(54)		NDA		Bihar People's Party	2	0	1.7				
Bihar(54)		Congress+		Rashtriya Janata Dal	35	7	28.29				
Bihar(54)		Congress+		Indian National Congress	15	4	8.81				
Bihar(54)		Congress+		Communist Party of India (Marxist) (CPM)	1	0	0.1				
Bihar(54)		Congress+		Communist Party of India (CPI)	1	0	1.0				
Bihar(54)		Congress+		Rashtriya Lok Dal	1	0	0				
Bihar(54)		Third Front		Communist Party of India (Marxist) (CPM)	1	1	0.9				
Bihar(54)		Third Front		Communist Party of India (CPI)	8	0	1.7				
Bihar(54)		Third Front		All India Forward Bloc (AIFB)	1	0	0				
Bihar(54)	-	-		Independent	187	1	4.2				
Goa(2)		NDA		Bharatiya Janata Party (BJP)	2	2	51.49				
Goa(2)		Congress+		Indian National Congress	2	0	39.01				
Gujarat(26)		NDA		Bharatiya Janata Party (BJP)	26	20	52.48				
Gujarat(26)		Congress+		Indian National Congress	26	6	45.44				
Haryana(10)		NDA		Bharatiya Janata Party (BJP)	5	5	29.21				
Haryana(10)		NDA		Indian National Lok Dal	5	5	28.72				
Haryana(10)		Congress+		Indian National Congress	10	0	34.93				
Haryana(10)	-	-		Haryana Vikas Party	2	0	2.71				
Himachal Pradesh(4)		NDA		Bharatiya Janata Party (BJP)	3	3	46.27				
Himachal Pradesh(4)		NDA		Himachal Vikas Congress	1	1	12.37				
Himachal Pradesh(4)		Congress+		Indian National Congress	4	0	39.52				
Jammu & Kashmir(6)	-	-		Jammu & Kashmir National Conference	6	4	28.94				
Jammu & Kashmir(6)		NDA		Bharatiya Janata Party (BJP)	6	2	31.56				
Jammu & Kashmir(6)		Congress+		Indian National Congress	5	0	17.83				
Jammu & Kashmir(6)	-	-		Independent	28	0	9.63				
Karnataka(28)		Congress+		Indian National Congress	28	18	45.41				
Karnataka(28)		NDA		Bharatiya Janata Party (BJP)	19	7	27.19				
Karnataka(28)		NDA		Janata Dal (United)	9	3	13.28				
Karnataka(28)	-	-		Janata Dal (Secular)	27	0	10.85				
Kerala(20)		Congress+		Indian National Congress	17	8	39.25				
Kerala(20)		Congress+		Kerala Congress	1	1	2.3				
Kerala(20)		Congress+		Muslim League Kerala State Committee	2	2	5.6				
Kerala(20)		Third Front		Communist Party of India (Marxist) (CPM)	12	8	27.90				
Kerala(20)		Third Front		Communist Party of India (CPI)	4	0	7.57				
Kerala(20)		Third Front		Independent	2	0	3.6				
Kerala(20)		Third Front		Kerala Congress	1	1	2.4				
Kerala(20)		Third Front		Janata Dal (Secular)	1	0	2.2				
Kerala(20)		NDA		Bharatiya Janata Party (BJP)	14	0	6.56				
Kerala(20)		NDA		Janata Dal (United)	5	0	1.3				
Madhya Pradesh(40)		NDA		Bharatiya Janata Party (BJP)	40	29	46.58				
Madhya Pradesh(40)		Congress+		Indian National Congress	40	11	43.91				
Madhya Pradesh(40)	-	-		Bahujan Samaj Party	27	0	5.23				
Madhya Pradesh(40)	-	-		Samajwadi Party	20	0	1.37				
Maharashtra(48)		NDA		Shiv Sena	22	15	16.86				
Maharashtra(48)		NDA		Bharatiya Janata Party (BJP)	26	13	21.18				
Maharashtra(48)		Congress+		Indian National Congress	42	10	29.71				
Maharashtra(48)		Congress+		Bharipa Bahujan Mahasangh	4	1	2.1				
Maharashtra(48)		Congress+		Republican Party of India	2	0	1.4				
Maharashtra(48)	-	-		Nationalist Congress Party	38	6	21.58				
Maharashtra(48)	-	-		Janata Dal (Secular)	2	1	0.9				
Maharashtra(48)	-	-		Independent	78	1	3.3				
Maharashtra(48)	-	-		Peasants And Workers Party of India	2	1	0.9				
Manipur(2)		NDA		Manipur State Congress Party	1	1	24.89				
Manipur(2)		NDA		Bharatiya Janata Party (BJP)	1	0	1				
Manipur(2)	-	-		Nationalist Congress Party	1	1	13.49				
Manipur(2)	-	-		Manipur Peoples Party	1	0	16.25				
Orissa(21)		NDA		Biju Janata Dal	12	10	33.00				
Orissa(21)		NDA		Bharatiya Janata Party (BJP)	9	9	24.63				
Orissa(21)		Congress+		Indian National Congress	20	2	36.94				
Punjab(13)
Punjab(13)		Congress+		Indian National Congress	11	8	38.4				
Punjab(13)		Congress+		Communist Party of India (CPI)	1	1	3.7				
Punjab(13)		Congress+		Communist Party of India (Marxist) (CPM)	1	0	2.2				
Punjab(13)		NDA		Shiromani Akali Dal	9	2	28.6				
Punjab(13)		NDA		Bharatiya Janata Party (BJP)	3	1	9.2				
Punjab(13)		NDA		Democratic Bahujan Samaj Morcha	1	0	2.7				
Punjab(13)	-	-		Shiromani Akali Dal (Simranjit Singh Mann)	1	1	3.4				
Rajasthan(25)		NDA		Bharatiya Janata Party (BJP)	24	16	23.01				
Rajasthan(25)		NDA		Janata Dal (United)	1	0	1.6				
Rajasthan(25)		Congress+		Indian National Congress	25	9	17.83				
Tamil Nadu(39)
Tamil Nadu(39)		NDA		Dravida Munnetra Kazhagam	19	12	23.1				
Tamil Nadu(39)		NDA		Pattali Makkal Katchi	7	5	8.2				
Tamil Nadu(39)		NDA		Bharatiya Janata Party (BJP)	6	4	7.1				
Tamil Nadu(39)		NDA		Marumalarchi Dravida Munnetra Kazhagam	5	4	6.0				
Tamil Nadu(39)		NDA		MGR Anna Dravida Munnetra Kazhagam	1	1	1.5				
Tamil Nadu(39)		NDA		Tamizhaga Rajiv Congress	1	0	1.2				
Tamil Nadu(39)		Congress+		All India Anna Dravida Munnetra Kazhagam	24	10	25.7				
Tamil Nadu(39)		Congress+		Indian National Congress	11	2	11.1				
Tamil Nadu(39)		Congress+		Communist Party of India (Marxist) (CPM)	2	1	2.3				
Tamil Nadu(39)		Congress+		Communist Party Of India (CPI)	2	0	2.6				
Uttar Pradesh(85)
Uttar Pradesh(85)		NDA		Bharatiya Janata Party (BJP)	77	29	27.64				
Uttar Pradesh(85)		NDA		Akhil Bharatiya Lok Tantrik Congress	4	2	1.51				
Uttar Pradesh(85)		NDA		Independent	1	1	3.62				
Uttar Pradesh(85)		NDA		Janata Dal (United)	2	0	0.6				
Uttar Pradesh(85)		Congress+		Indian National Congress	76	10	14.72				
Uttar Pradesh(85)		Congress+		Rashtriya Lok Dal	6	2	2.49				
Uttar Pradesh(85)		Congress+		Republican Party of India	1	0	0				
Uttar Pradesh(85)	-	-		Bahujan Samaj Party	85	14	22.08				
Uttar Pradesh(85)	-	-		Samajwadi Party	84	26	24.06				
Uttar Pradesh(85)	-	-		Samajwadi Janata Party (Rashtriya)	2	1	0.46				
West Bengal(42)
West Bengal(42)		Third Front		Communist Party of India (Marxist) (CPM)	32	21	35.57				
West Bengal(42)		Third Front		Communist Party Of India (CPI)	3	3	3.47				
West Bengal(42)		Third Front		Revolutionary Socialist Party (RSP)	4	3	4.25				
West Bengal(42)		Third Front		All India Forward Bloc (AIFB)	3	2	3.45				
West Bengal(42)		NDA		All India Trinamool Congress (AITC)	28	8	26.04				
West Bengal(42)		NDA		Bharatiya Janata Party (BJP)	13	2	11.13				
West Bengal(42)		Congress+		Indian National Congress (INC)	41	3	13.29				

== Overall result ==
Date(s)	State	Government before	Chief Minister before	Government after	Elected Chief Minister	Maps
4 June 1999	Goa	Indian National Congress	Luizinho Faleiro	Indian National Congress	Luizinho Faleiro	
5, 11, 18 September 1999	Andhra Pradesh	Telugu Desam Party	N. Chandrababu Naidu	Telugu Desam Party	N. Chandrababu Naidu	
5 and 11 September 1999	Maharashtra	Shiv Sena	Narayan Rane	Indian National Congress	Vilasrao Deshmukh	
5 and 11 September 1999	Maharashtra	Bharatiya Janata Party	Narayan Rane	Nationalist Congress Party	Vilasrao Deshmukh	
5 and 11 September 1999	Karnataka	Janata Dal (United)	J. H. Patel	Indian National Congress	S. M. Krishna	
3 October 1999	Arunachal Pradesh	Arunachal Congress	Gegong Apang	Indian National Congress	Mukut Mithi	
3 October 1999	Sikkim	Sikkim Democratic Front	Pawan Kumar Chamling	Sikkim Democratic Front	Pawan Kumar Chamling	

== Legislative Assembly elections ==
=== Andhra Pradesh ===
Source: Election Commission of India
Alliance/Party		Popular vote			Seats		
Alliance/Party		Votes	%	±pp	Contested	Won	+/−
NDA	Telugu Desam Party	14,613,307	43.87	▼0.27	269	180	▼36
NDA	Bharatiya Janata Party	1,223,481	3.67	▼0.22	24	12	▲9
NDA	Total	15,836,788	47.54	N/A	293	192	N/A
Indian National Congress		13,526,309	40.61	▲6.76	293	91	▲65
All India Majlis-e-Ittehadul Muslimeen		360,211	1.08	▲0.38	5	4	▲3
LF	Communist Party of India (Marxist)	567,761	1.70	▼1.26	48	2	▼13
LF	Communist Party of India	539,700	1.62	▼1.77	45	0	▼19
LF	Total	1,107,461	3.32	N/A	93	2	N/A
Other parties		885,832	2.67	N/A	658	0	N/A
Independents		1,593,015	4.78	▼3.88	762	5	▼7
Total		33,309,616	100.00	N/A	2,104	294	N/A
Vote statistics
Valid votes		33,309,616	97.05				
Invalid votes		1,011,948	2.95				
Votes cast/ turnout		34,334,842	69.15				
Abstentions		15,319,547	30.85				
Registered voters		49,654,389					

=== Arunachal Pradesh ===
Party	Votes	%	Seats	+/–
Indian National Congress	213,097	51.78	53	▲10
Arunachal Congress	68,645	16.68	1	–
Bharatiya Janata Party	44,556	10.83	0	–
Nationalist Congress Party	35,967	8.74	4	–
Ajeya Bharat Party	425	0.10	0	–
Independents	48,842	11.87	2	–
Total	411,532	100.00	60	0
Valid votes	411,532	96.99		
Invalid/blank votes	12,770	3.01		
Total votes	424,302	100.00		
Registered voters/turnout	611,481	69.39		
Source: ECI

=== Goa ===
Rank	Party	Seats Contested	Seats Won
1	Indian National Congress	40	21
2	Bharatiya Janata Party	39	10
3	Maharashtrawadi Gomantak	17	4
4	United Goans Democratic Party	11	2
5	Goa Rajiv Congress Party	14	2
6	Independent	49	1
	Total		40

=== Karnataka ===
Parties	Popular vote			Seats		
Parties	Votes	%	+pp	Contested	Won	+/-
Indian National Congress	90,77,815	40.84	▲13.89	222	132	▲98
Bharatiya Janata Party	45,98,741	20.69	▲3.70	149	44	▲4
Janata Dal (United)	30,06,253	13.53	▲13.53	112	18	▲18
Janata Dal (Secular)	23,16,885	10.42	▲10.42	203	10	▲10
Independent	26,66,444	12.00	▲2.34	476	19	▲1
Others	5,59,361	2.52	▼10.34	179	1	▼16
Total	2,22,25,499	100.00		1,341	224	±0
Valid votes	2,22,25,499	95.88				
Invalid votes	9,56,294	4.12				
Votes cast / turnout	2,31,94,283	67.65				
Abstentions	1,10,89,815	32.35				
Registered voters	3,42,84,098					

=== Maharashtra ===
Political Party	Seats			Popular Vote		
Political Party	Contested	Won	Change +/-	Votes polled	Votes%	Change +/-
Indian National Congress 75 / 288 (26%)	249	75	▼5	8,937,043	27.20%	▼3.80%
Shiv Sena 69 / 288 (24%)	161	69	▼4	5,692,812	17.33%	▲0.94%
Nationalist Congress Party 58 / 288 (20%)	223	58	▲58	7,425,427	22.60%	▲22.60% (New Party)
Bharatiya Janata Party 56 / 288 (19%)	117	56	▼9	4,776,301	14.54%	▲1.74%
Peasants and Workers Party of India 5 / 288 (2%)	22	5	▼1	490,535	1.49%	▼0.56%
Bharipa Bahujan Mahasangh 3 / 288 (1%)	34	3	▲3	606,827	1.85%	▼1.18%
Janata Dal (Secular) 2 / 288 (0.7%)	25	2	▼9 (from JD seats)	497,127	1.51%	▼4.35% (from JD vote share)
Samajwadi Party 2 / 288 (0.7%)	15	2	▼1	227,640	0.69%	▼0.24%
Communist Party of India (Marxist) 2 / 288 (0.7%)	23	2	▼1	210,030	0.64%	▼0.36%
Republican Party of India 1 / 288 (0.3%)	10	1	▲1	226,481	0.69%	▲0.54%
Gondwana Ganatantra Party 1 / 288 (0.3%)	16	1	▲1	67,138	0.20%	▲0.20% (New Party)
Native People's Party 1 / 288 (0.3%)	1	1	▲1	63,931	0.19%	▲0.19%
Samajwadi Janata Party (Maharashtra) 1 / 288 (0.3%)	5	1	▲1	43,870	0.13%	▼0.01%
Maharashtra Vikas Congress	2	0	▼1	31,173	0.09%	▼0.03%
Nag Vidarbha Andolan Samiti	4	0	▼1	26,966	0.08%	▼0.13%
Independents 12 / 288 (4%)	837	12	▼33	3,116,564	9.49%	▼14.14%
Total	2006	288	Steady	32,856,693	60.95%	▼10.74%

=== Sikkim ===
Party	Votes	%	Seats	+/–
Sikkim Democratic Front	107,214	52.32	24	▲5
Sikkim Sangram Parishad	85,827	41.88	7	▼3
Indian National Congress	7,512	3.67	0	▼2
Communist Party of India (Marxist)	398	0.19	0	0
Independents	3,976	1.94	1	0
Total	204,927	100.00	32	0
Valid votes	204,927	98.06		
Invalid/blank votes	4,056	1.94		
Total votes	208,983	100.00		
Registered voters/turnout	255,377	81.83		
Source: CEO Sikkim

== Legislative By-elections ==
=== Jammu and Kashmir ===
Winner, runner-up, voter turnout, and victory margin in every constituency
Assembly Constituency		Turnout	Winner				Runner Up				Margin
#k	Names	%	Candidate	Party	Votes	%	Candidate	Party	Votes	%	Margin
1	Langate	40.62%	Mohammed Sultan Pandit	Independent	4,537	25.91%	Bashir Ahmad Wani	JKNC	4,465	21.8%	72
2	Srigufwara–Bijbehara	15.8%	Abdul Rehman	Independent	3,756	29.07%	Rafi Ahmad Mir	JKNC	2,506	2.38%	1,250
