= 1996 Indian general election =

- 27 April, 2 May and 7 May 1996

543 of the 545 seats in the Lok Sabha 272 seats needed for a majority
- Registered: 592,572,288
- Turnout: 57.94% (▲1.21pp)
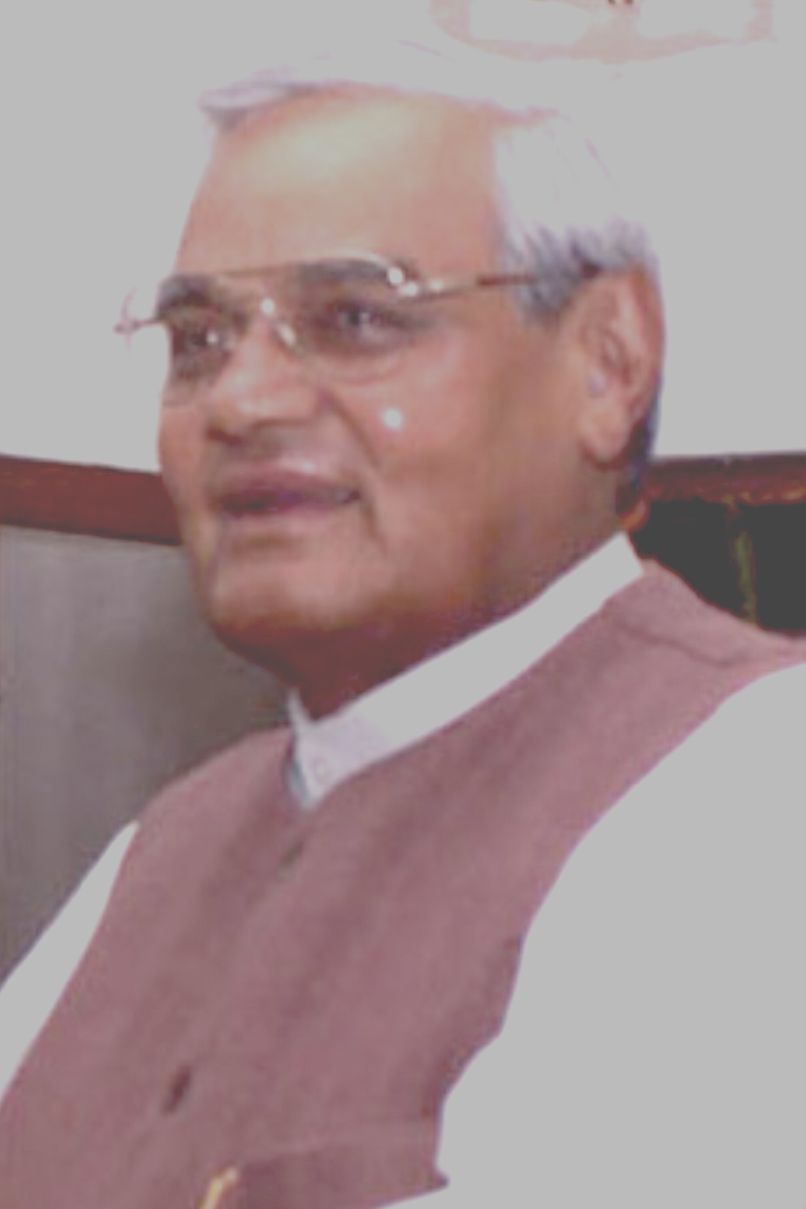

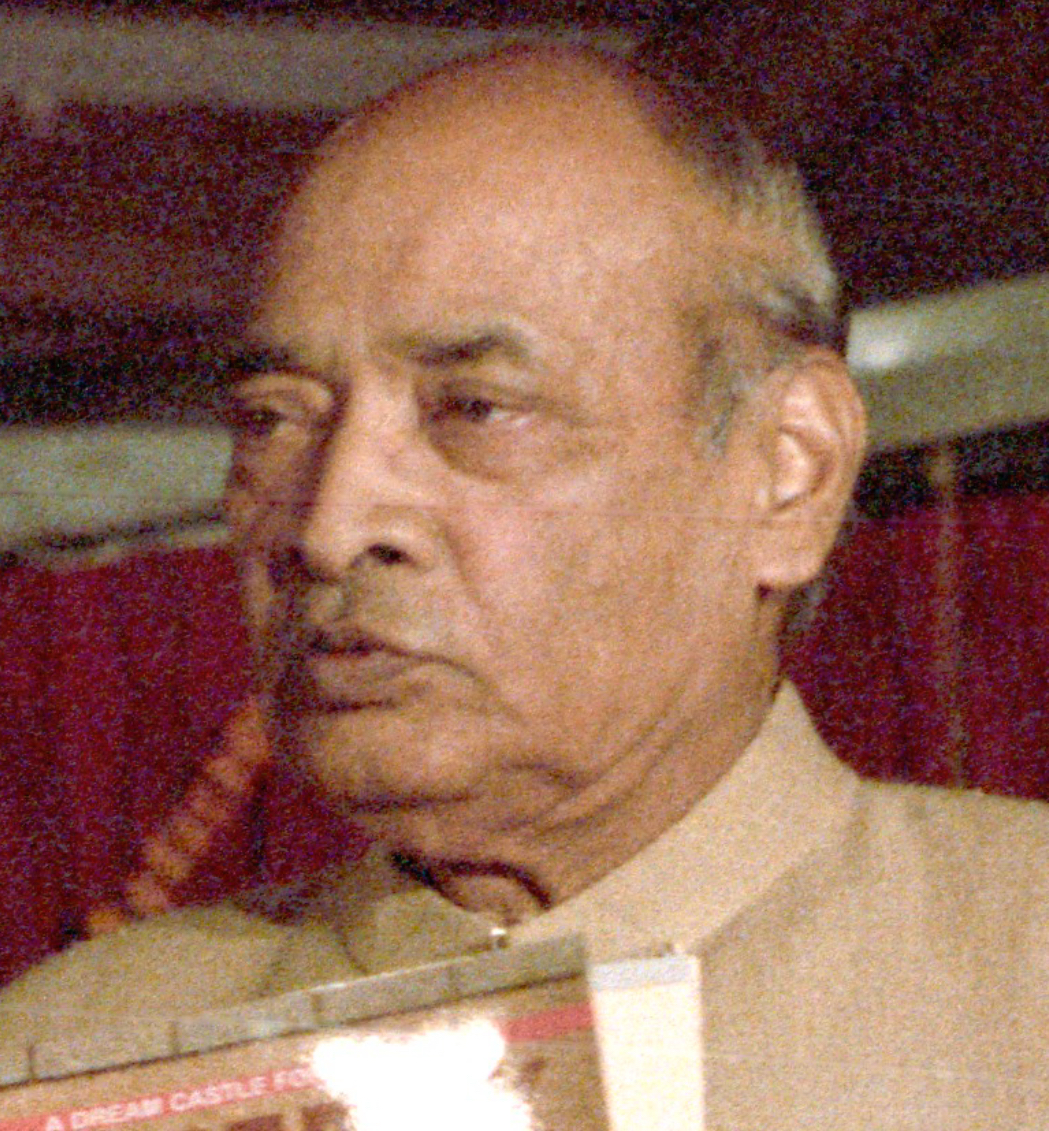

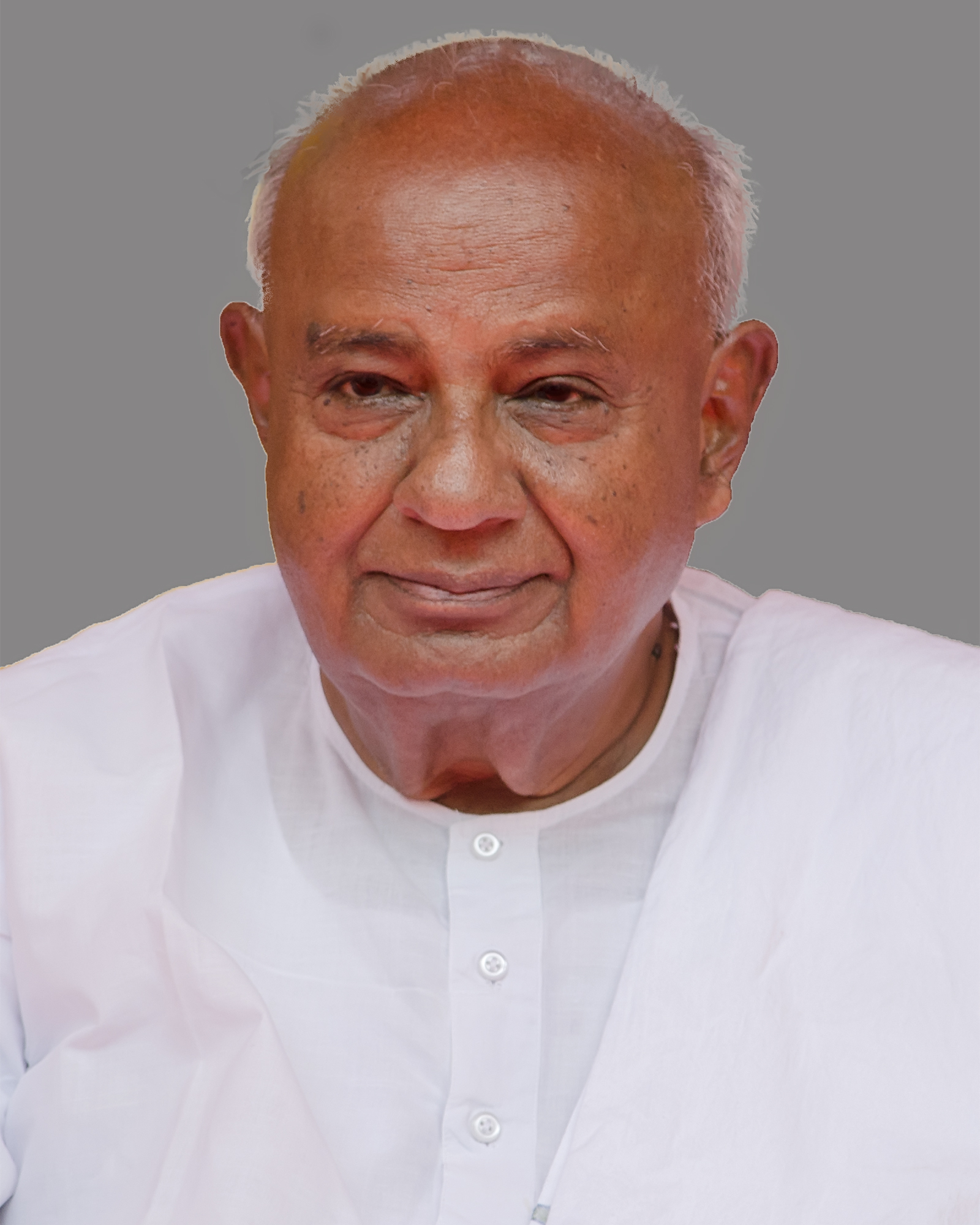

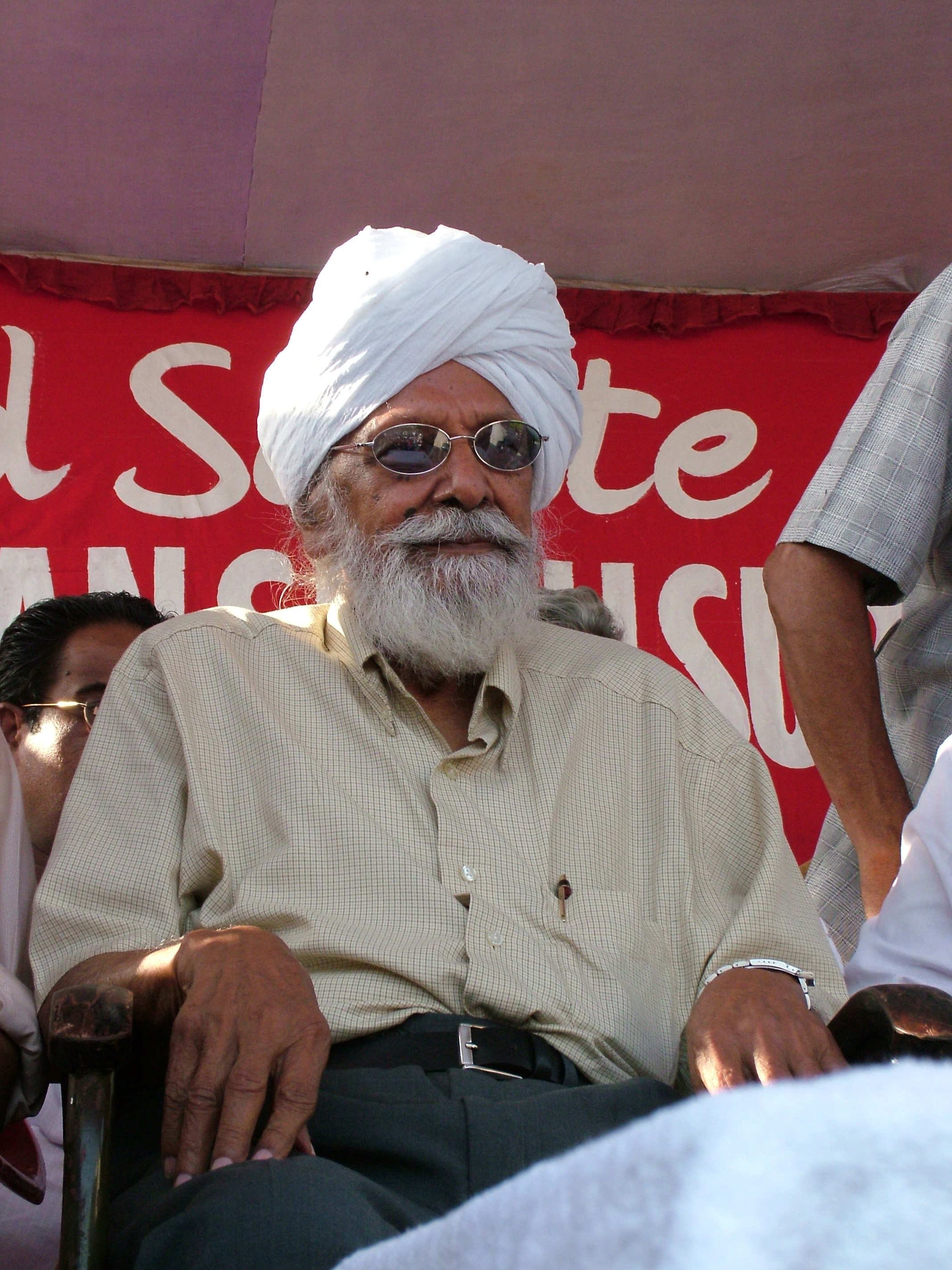
	First party	Second party
Leader	Atal Bihari Vajpayee	P. V. Narasimha Rao
Party	BJP	INC
Last election	20.07%, 120 seats	36.40%, 244 seats
Seats won	161	140
Seat change	▲41	▼104
Popular vote	67,950,851	96,455,493
Percentage	20.29%	28.80%
Swing	▲0.18pp	▼7.46pp
Alliance seats	187	143
	Third party	Fourth party
Leader	H. D. Deve Gowda	Harkishan Singh Surjeet
Party	JD	CPI(M)
Alliance	UF	UF
Last election	11.73%, 59 seats	6.16%, 35 seats
Seats won	46	32
Seat change	▼13	▼3
Popular vote	27,070,340	20,496,810
Percentage	8.08%	6.12%
Swing	▼3.76pp	▼0.04pp
- Results by constituency
Prime Minister before election
P. V. Narasimha Rao
INC
Prime Minister after election
Atal Bihari Vajpayee
BJP

General elections were held in India on 27 April, 2 May and 7 May 1996 to elect the members of the eleventh Lok Sabha.

The elections resulted in a hung parliament with no single party having a majority. The Bharatiya Janata Party, which had won the most seats despite finishing second in the popular vote, formed a short-lived government under Prime Minister Atal Bihari Vajpayee. However, two weeks later the United Front coalition was able to secure a parliamentary majority and H. D. Deve Gowda of Janata Dal became prime minister. In 1997 Inder Kumar Gujral, also from the United Front, succeeded Gowda as prime minister. Due to the instability, early elections were held in 1998. The elections were the first since 1980 in which every states' seats were elected in a single election period.

== Background ==
The Indian National Congress government of Prime Minister P. V. Narasimha Rao came into the election on the back of several government scandals like the 1992 Indian stock market scam and accusations of mismanagement. Seven cabinet members had resigned during the previous term, and Rao himself faced charges of corruption. The Congress(I) more generally had been plagued in recent years by a series of splits, conflicts and factional disputes that had seen various key regional parties and figures abandon the party. In particular, the high-profile May 1995 defection of Arjun Singh and Narayan Datt Tiwari to form the new All India Indira Congress (Tiwari) party underscored the internal divisions within the Congress (Indira).

The government was further weakened by a series of major scandals breaking less than 12 months from the election. In July 1995 it was found a former Congress(I) youth leader had murdered his wife and tried to destroy the evidence by stuffing her corpse into a tandoor (clay oven). In August 1995 the Vohra Report was finally released to the parliament, decrying that a politician-criminal nexus was "virtually running a parallel government, pushing the state apparatus into irrelevance". Government credibility fell further still when in late 1995 violence significantly worsened in the Kashmir region, and sporadic fighting and ethnic tensions boiled over in Punjab province. As a result of the scandals, the Rao government went into the 1996 election at a low of ebb of public support.

== Campaign ==
The elections triggered a significant realignment of political forces in Indians, with all-India parties attempting to construct widespread regional coalitions with minor parties in order to secure a central majority. Such political negotiations were to become an increasingly necessary process in Indian politics over the next two decades as the dominance of the INC(I) declined and smaller, ethnic and regional parties took its place. The Bharatiya Janata Party, led by Lal Krishna Advani attempted to add several regional coalition partners - most notably the All India Anna Dravida Munnetra Kazhagam and the Bahujan Samaj Party, but was ultimately unsuccessful in overcoming ideological differences. Yet it did join with several strong regional partners - Shiv Sena, Haryana Vikas Party, and the Samata Party. The Congress(I) party attempted to form regional allies as well, most notably with the All India Anna Dravida Munnetra Kazhagam.

The so-called "Third Force" during the 1996 elections was the National Front. After its collapse in 1990, the coalition had chopped and changed before reuniting in the run up to the 1996 election. Three main parties grouped back together in September 1995 in hopes of presenting a viable political choice - the Communist parties like the Communist Party of India and Communist Party of India (Marxist), Janata Dal and the Telugu Desam Party. It attempted to build a wider coalition of regional partners and state parties, however negotiations repeatedly broke down, and no consensus could be arrived at on a 'common minimum program' - a platform of issues on which all parties could agree upon. A split in the Uttar Pradesh government in December 1995 divided the front further. Finally, lacking a strong leader or common set of principles, the main three parties joined with the Samajwadi Party in a common goal of simply denying power to either the Congress(I) or BJP. Thus a characteristic of the 1996 elections was a large number of strong regional and state parties declined to form an alliance with any of the three major contenders for government.

In January, only a few months before the election, a major scandal erupted: the Jain hawala scandal. Jain, an industrialist in the steel and power sectors, was revealed to have given US$33 million in bribes to politicians from nearly all major parties in return for favours. Further shocking the public, Jain had also channelled money to Kashmiri Muslim militants. In the first wave of names implicated were three Rao cabinet members, Arjun Singh from the breakaway Congress (T) party, Bharatiya Janata Party leader Lal Krishna Advani, Sharad Yadav (leader of the Janata Dal parliamentary party), and former Congress(I) Prime Minister Rajiv Gandhi. Almost 115 names would eventually be released, and numerous candidates and ministers were forced to resign in the aftermath. Most significantly was the resignation of L.K. Advani as Member of Parliament, though he continued to lead the election campaigning as the BJP's president.

The BJP ran a campaign centred around a four-point plan which aimed for probity of public life, self-reliance in the economy, social harmony and greater security. It strongly advocated an economic plan which would significantly scale back government intervention and encourage capital investment and creation. In the backdrop of the 1992 demolition of the Babri Masjid, BJP stressed on the role of Hindutva in its vision for India, creating a more Hindu-orientated state by removing the provisions of secularism and making Hinduism the country's state religion, implementing a nationwide ban on cow slaughter, abolishing personal laws of non-Hindus by introducing a uniform civil code and removing the special status of Kashmir alongside construction of the Ram-mandir as its main agenda. The Congress(I) Party attempted to campaign on its foreign policy record, its handling of the numerous natural and ethnic crises that had emerged over the past five years, and on better concessions for ethnic minorities and empowering the state governments. It additionally stressed the economic gains already made by the government due to its liberalization policies post 1992. However it drew flak for promising re-construction of the demolished mosque at the disputed site of Ayodhya in its electoral manifesto, leading the BJP to accuse the Congress (Indira) of indulging in Muslim appeasement and fostering Hinduphobia. The Janata Dal and the National Front campaigned on maintaining a strong public sector though with some commitment to deregulation and anti-corruption measures while committing to implement the Mandal Commission report. It also pushed other more populist measures as well, such as more state-run infrastructure projects, subsidised fertilizer, and increased education investment.

== Results ==
The BJP capitalised on the communal polarisation that followed the demolition of Babri Masjid to win 161 Lok Sabha seats, making it the largest party in parliament. L.K. Advani, whose aggressive campaigning as BJP president is widely credited with these results. The election delivered an unclear mandate and resulted in a hung parliament. Although Congress continued to remain the single largest party in terms of voteshare, it was for the first time since the country's first general elections that the Congress' voteshare fell below 30% on a national scale. The Congress also for the first time in its existence, won fewer than 150 seats in a general election, surpassing the record of 154 seats in the 1977 general elections. Hence the result was considered as the worst result of the Congress party in its history to that date, with commentators blaming the poor result on the personal unpopularity of Prime Minister Rao and the numerous internal divisions that had dogged the party alongside the religious polarisation fueled by the BJP under the Ayodhya dispute. Congress(I) was almost wiped out in its traditional strongholds of Uttar Pradesh & Bihar with many stalwarts like Ram Lakhan Singh Yadav, Jagannath Mishra, Satyendra Narayan Sinha suffered electoral setbacks inflicted by both Janata Dal & BJP. The BJP became the largest party within the Lok Sabha, a first for a non-Congress party, although it secured neither a significant increase in the popular vote or enough seats to secure a parliamentary majority.

Party	Votes	%	Seats
Indian National Congress	96,455,493	28.80	140
Bharatiya Janata Party	67,950,851	20.29	161
Janata Dal	27,070,340	8.08	46
Communist Party of India (Marxist)	20,496,810	6.12	32
Bahujan Samaj Party	13,453,235	4.02	11
Samajwadi Party	10,989,241	3.28	17
Telugu Desam Party	9,931,826	2.97	16
Tamil Maanila Congress	7,339,982	2.19	20
Samata Party	7,256,086	2.17	8
Dravida Munnetra Kazhagam	7,151,381	2.14	17
Communist Party of India	6,582,263	1.97	12
Shiv Sena	4,989,994	1.49	15
All India Indira Congress (Tiwari)	4,903,070	1.46	4
NTR Telugu Desam Party (Lakshmi Parvathi)	3,249,267	0.97	0
Asom Gana Parishad	2,560,506	0.76	5
Shiromani Akali Dal	2,534,979	0.76	8
All India Anna Dravida Munnetra Kazhagam	2,130,286	0.64	0
Revolutionary Socialist Party	2,105,469	0.63	5
Republican Party of India	1,454,363	0.43	0
Jharkhand Mukti Morcha	1,287,072	0.38	1
All India Forward Bloc	1,279,492	0.38	3
Marumalarchi Dravida Munnetra Kazhagam	1,235,812	0.37	0
Haryana Vikas Party	1,156,322	0.35	3
Communist Party of India (Marxist–Leninist) Liberation	808,065	0.24	0
Indian Union Muslim League	757,316	0.23	2
Janata Party	631,021	0.19	0
Karnataka Congress Party	581,868	0.17	1
Pattali Makkal Katchi	571,910	0.17	0
Peasants and Workers Party of India	437,805	0.13	0
Indian Congress (Socialist)	404,261	0.12	0
Kerala Congress (M)	382,319	0.11	1
All India Majlis-e-Ittehadul Muslimeen	340,070	0.10	1
Shiromani Akali Dal (Simranjit Singh Mann)	339,520	0.10	0
Madhya Pradesh Vikas Congress	337,539	0.10	1
Bharipa Bahujan Mahasangh	329,695	0.10	0
Kerala Congress	320,539	0.10	0
Jharkhand Mukti Morcha (Mardi)	299,055	0.09	0
United Minorities Front, Assam	244,571	0.07	0
Apna Dal	222,669	0.07	0
Autonomous State Demand Committee	180,112	0.05	1
Forward Bloc (Socialist)	172,685	0.05	0
Gujarat Adijati Vikash Paksh	166,003	0.05	0
Maharashtrawadi Gomantak Party	129,220	0.04	1
Sikkim Democratic Front	124,218	0.04	1
Federal Party of Manipur	120,557	0.04	0
Marxist Co-ordination Committee	114,406	0.03	0
Krantikari Samajwadi Manch	113,975	0.03	0
Mizo National Front	111,710	0.03	0
United Goans Democratic Party	109,346	0.03	1
Jharkhand Party (Naren)	102,111	0.03	0
Jammu & Kashmir Panthers Party	99,599	0.03	0
Savarn Samaj Party	84,725	0.03	0
Jharkhand Party	78,907	0.02	0
Majlis Bachao Tahreek	78,335	0.02	0
Nag Vidarbha Andolan Samiti	66,065	0.02	0
Peoples Democratic Party	65,641	0.02	0
Amra Bangali	65,595	0.02	0
Mahabharat People's Party	64,266	0.02	0
Chhattisgarh Mukti Morcha	60,361	0.02	0
Jharkhand People's Party	58,132	0.02	0
Bahujan Samaj Party (Ambedkar)	52,585	0.02	0
Tripura Upajati Juba Samiti	52,300	0.02	0
Akhil Bharatiya Jan Sangh	49,978	0.01	0
Satya Marg Party	48,056	0.01	0
Sikkim Sangram Parishad	42,175	0.01	0
Lok Hit Party	37,127	0.01	0
United Tribal Nationalist Liberation Front	34,803	0.01	0
Pavitra Hindustan Kaazhagam	34,147	0.01	0
Marxist Communist Party of India (S.S. Srivastava)	33,900	0.01	0
Kannada Chalevali Vatal Paksha	31,136	0.01	0
Akhil Bharatiya Bhrastachar Normoolan Sena	30,970	0.01	0
Hul Jharkhand Party	30,220	0.01	0
Bhoomijotak Samooh	29,874	0.01	0
Proutist Sarva Samaj Samiti	26,403	0.01	0
Akhil Bhartiya Loktantra Party	25,131	0.01	0
Republican Party of India (Athawale)	22,640	0.01	0
Uttar Pradesh Republican Party	22,515	0.01	0
Anaithinthiya Thamizhaga Munnetra Kazhag	19,394	0.01	0
New India Party	19,135	0.01	0
Bhatiya Krishi Udyog Sangh	17,744	0.01	0
Indian National League	15,954	0.00	0
Jan Parishad	15,112	0.00	0
Rashtriya Nayay Party	13,160	0.00	0
Lokdal	11,957	0.00	0
Shoshit Samaj Dal	11,937	0.00	0
Bahujan Kranti Dal (JAI)	11,735	0.00	0
Mahakushal Vikas Party	11,152	0.00	0
Jansatta Party	10,901	0.00	0
Bharatiya Minorities Suraksha Mahasangh	10,657	0.00	0
Republican Party of India (Democratic)	10,072	0.00	0
Gondwana Ganatantra Party	9,985	0.00	0
Pragtisheel Manav Samaj Party	9,974	0.00	0
Akhil Bharatiya Berozgaar Party	9,813	0.00	0
Janhit Morcha	9,404	0.00	0
Hindustan Janata Party	9,208	0.00	0
Rashtriya Samajwadi Party 'pragatisheel'	8,779	0.00	0
Lok Party	8,758	0.00	0
Pachim Banga Rajya Muslim League	8,624	0.00	0
Republican Party of India (Khobragade)	8,491	0.00	0
Akhil Bhartiya Janata Vikas Party	7,726	0.00	0
Arya Sabha	7,563	0.00	0
Bharatiya Jan Sabha	7,338	0.00	0
Republican Presidium Party of India	7,298	0.00	0
Bahujan Kranti Dal	6,968	0.00	0
Political Party of National Management Service	6,667	0.00	0
Rashtriya Surajya Parishad	6,000	0.00	0
Samajwadi Janata Party (Maharashtra)	5,784	0.00	0
Maharashtra Pradesh Krantikari Party	5,765	0.00	0
Akhil Bartiya Manav Seva Dal	5,673	0.00	0
National Republican Party	5,271	0.00	0
Indian Democratic Party	5,084	0.00	0
Bharatiya Lok Tantrik Mazdoor Dal	5,075	0.00	0
Surajya Party	4,917	0.00	0
Hindu Mahasabha	4,720	0.00	0
Rashtriya Aikta Manch	4,574	0.00	0
National Democratic Peoples Front	4,462	0.00	0
Bolshevik Party of India	4,345	0.00	0
Bharatiya Lok Panchayat	4,018	0.00	0
Bharatiya Rashtriya Party	3,724	0.00	0
Rashtriya Kisan Party	3,635	0.00	0
Akhil Bharatiya Mahasand Sarvahara Krantikari Party	3,552	0.00	0
Bharatiya Labour Party	3,550	0.00	0
Rashtriya Unnatsheel Das	3,476	0.00	0
Rashtriya Samdarshi Party	3,360	0.00	0
Vijeta Party	3,328	0.00	0
Satyayug Party	3,319	0.00	0
Bharatiya Rashtriya Morcha	3,181	0.00	0
Rashtriya Mazdoor Ekta Party	3,176	0.00	0
Marxist Engelist Leninist Proletariat Health Commune	3,155	0.00	0
Akhil Bharatiya Rashtriya Azad Hind Party	3,152	0.00	0
Bahujan Samaj Party (Raj Bahadur)	3,114	0.00	0
Socialist Party (Lohia)	3,006	0.00	0
Kannada Paksha	2,883	0.00	0
Bharatiya Manav Raksha Dal	2,796	0.00	0
Akhil Bharatiya Dalit Utthan Party	2,654	0.00	0
Akhil Bharatiya Desh Bhakt Morcha	2,295	0.00	0
Indian Secular Congress	2,136	0.00	0
Bira Oriya Party	2,088	0.00	0
Republican Party of India (Sivaraj)	2,081	0.00	0
Bharathiya Nethaji Party	2,024	0.00	0
Bharatiya Rajiv Congress	1,967	0.00	0
Bharatiya Jantantrik Parishad	1,867	0.00	0
Ekta Samaj Party	1,852	0.00	0
Congress Of People	1,850	0.00	0
Revolutionary Communist Party Of India (Rasik Bhatt)	1,803	0.00	0
Bhartiya Ekta Party	1,801	0.00	0
Shoshit Samaj Party	1,684	0.00	0
Samajwadi Dal	1,637	0.00	0
Akhil Bharatiya Shivsena Rashtrawadi	1,477	0.00	0
Bharatiya Kranti Sena	1,439	0.00	0
Indian Democratic People's Party	1,438	0.00	0
Ekta Krandi Dal U.P.	1,409	0.00	0
Indian Bahujan Samajwadi Party	1,376	0.00	0
Sarvadharam Party (Madhya Pradesh)	1,327	0.00	0
People's Democratic League of India	1,276	0.00	0
Punjab Vikas Party (Punjab)	1,185	0.00	0
Desh Bhakt Party	1,148	0.00	0
Sabjan Party	1,120	0.00	0
Akhil Bharatiya Lok Tantrik Alp-Sankhyak Jan Morcha	1,111	0.00	0
Kisan Vyawasayee Mazdoor Party	1,056	0.00	0
Pratap Shiv Sena	1,049	0.00	0
Adarsh Lok Dal	1,037	0.00	0
Gareebjan Samaj Party	962	0.00	0
Akhil Bharatiya Dharmnirpeksh Dal	894	0.00	0
All India Azad Hind Mazdur & Jan Kalyan Party	883	0.00	0
Bahujan Loktantrik Party	857	0.00	0
Socialist Party (Ramakant Pandey)	848	0.00	0
Manav Sewa Sangh	841	0.00	0
Bharatiya Samajwadi Vikas Party	805	0.00	0
Akhil Bhartiya Rajarya Sabha	787	0.00	0
Indian Union Muslim League (IUML)	786	0.00	0
Akhil Bharatiya Ram Rajya Parishad	724	0.00	0
Ambedkar Kranti Dal	667	0.00	0
Bhartiya Jan Kisan Party	633	0.00	0
Mahabharath Mahajan Sabha	572	0.00	0
Bharatiya Samaj Sangathan Morcha	535	0.00	0
Rashtriya Bharat Nav Nirman Sangathan	528	0.00	0
Samajik Kranti Dal	522	0.00	0
Rashtriya Krantikari Dal	520	0.00	0
Bharat Jan Party	505	0.00	0
Hind National Party	496	0.00	0
Sachet Bharat Party	470	0.00	0
Bhartiya Azad Party	457	0.00	0
Bhrishtachar Virodhi Dal	434	0.00	0
Akhil Bharatiya Ram Rajya Parishad (Prem Ballabh Vyas)	428	0.00	0
Tamil Nadu Hindu Vellalar Youth Kazhagam	422	0.00	0
Pragati Sheel Party	407	0.00	0
Socialist League of India	384	0.00	0
United Indian Democratic Council	374	0.00	0
Rashtriya Samaj Sevak Dal	348	0.00	0
Akhil Bhartiya Kisan Mazdoor Morcha	345	0.00	0
Hindu Praja Party	332	0.00	0
Janata Kranti Congress	324	0.00	0
Mukt Bharat	295	0.00	0
Jan Swarajya Party	278	0.00	0
Gujarat Janta Parishad	266	0.00	0
Bharat Pensioner's Front	231	0.00	0
Bharatiya Parivartan Morcha	231	0.00	0
All India Democratic People Federation	195	0.00	0
Akhil Bharatiya Jagrook Nagrik Dal	176	0.00	0
Federation of Sabhas	142	0.00	0
Hind Kisan Mazdoor Party	131	0.00	0
Poorvanchal Rashtriya Congress	124	0.00	0
Kranti Dal	112	0.00	0
Jan Ekata Morcha	94	0.00	0
Bharatiya Sarvkalyan Krantidal	89	0.00	0
Manav Samaj Party	74	0.00	0
Labour Party of India (V.V. Prasad)	68	0.00	0
Bharatiya Rashtrawadi Dal	53	0.00	0
Independents	21,041,557	6.28	9
Nominated Anglo-Indians			2
Total	334,873,286	100.00	545
Valid votes	334,873,286	97.54	
Invalid/blank votes	8,434,804	2.46	
Total votes	343,308,090	100.00	
Registered voters/turnout	592,572,288	57.94	
Source: ECI

=== Results by state/union territory ===
State/Union Territory	Total seats	Seats won												
State/Union Territory	Total seats	BJP	INC	JD	CPM	TMC	SP	DMK	TDP	SHS	CPI	BSP	IND	OTH
Andhra Pradesh	42		22		1				16		2			1
Arunachal Pradesh	2												2	
Assam	14	1	5		1								1	6
Bihar	54	18	2	22			1				3		1	7
Goa	2													2
Gujarat	26	16	10											
Haryana	10	4	2										1	3
Himachal Pradesh	4		4											
Jammu and Kashmir	6	1	4	1										
Karnataka	28	6	5	16										1
Kerala	20		7	1	5						2		1	4
Madhya Pradesh	40	27	8									2	1	2
Maharashtra	48	18	15							15				
Manipur	2		2											
Meghalaya	2		1										1	
Mizoram	1		1											
Nagaland	1		1											
Orissa	21		16	4										1
Punjab	13		2									3		8
Rajasthan	25	12	12											1
Sikkim	1													1
Tamil Nadu	39					20		17			2			
Tripura	2				2									
Uttar Pradesh	85	52	5	2			16					6	1	3
West Bengal	42		9		23						3			7
A & N Islands	1		1											
Chandigarh	1	1												
D & N Haveli	1		1											
Daman and Diu	1		1											
Delhi	7	5	2											
Lakshadweep	1		1											
Pondicherry	1		1											
Total	543	161	140	46	32	20	17	17	16	15	12	11	9	47

== Aftermath ==
Following Westminster custom, President Shankar Dayal Sharma invited Atal Bihari Vajpayee as leader of the BJP to form a government. Sworn in on 15 May, the new prime minister was given two weeks to prove majority support in parliament. In the weeks leading up to the first confidence vote on 31 May, the BJP attempted to build a coalition by moderating positions to garner support from regional and Muslim parties, however sectarian issues and fears of certain nationalist policies of the BJP hampered efforts. On 28 May, Vajpayee conceded that he could not arrange support from more than 200 of the 545 members of parliament, and thus resigned rather than face the confidence vote, ending his 13-day government.

The second largest party, the Indian National Congress (Indira), also declined to form a government. After Janata Dal leader V. P. Singh refused to become prime minister for a second time, CPI(M) leader and West Bengal Chief Minister Jyoti Basu was approached by the National Front to be its prime ministerial face, but the party politburo refused to endorse it (a decision which Basu later criticised as a "historic blunder") in order to affirm its commitment towards establishing dictatorship of the proletariat. Basu put forward the name of Janata Dal leader and Karnataka Chief Minister H. D. Deve Gowda as the candidate for the Prime Minister post. Janata Dal and a bloc of smaller parties thus formed the United Front government, with outside support from INC(I). Gowda resigned on 21 April 1997 due to withdrawal of support by the Indian National Congress (Note: After 1996 the Indian National Congress (Indira) dropped the suffix 'Indira' from its name, becoming known as Indian National Congress) to pave way for I. K. Gujral, who maintained good relations with the Congress.

However the Fodder Scam resulted in many United Front members demanding the resignation of Lalu Prasad Yadav, an alliance partner and the then Chief Minister of Bihar. Yadav retaliated by breaking away from Janata Dal and forming Rashtriya Janata Dal (RJD) on 3 July 1997. Out of 45 Janata Dal members of parliament, 17 left the party and supported Yadav. However, the new party continued to support the United Front and Gujral's government was saved from immediate danger. Gujral resigned 11 months later when INC withdrew support from the government over Gujral's refusal to expel DMK from the government, whose leader M. Karunanidhi was implicated in assisting Rajiv Gandhi's assassination and the country went back to the polls in 1998.

== See also ==
- List of members of the 11th Lok Sabha
- 1996 Indian general election by state or union territory
