= 1998 Indian general election in Gujarat =

General elections were held in India in 1998 to constitute the 12th Lok Sabha, after the government led by I. K. Gujral collapsed when Indian National Congress (INC) withdrew support in November 1997. The outcome of the new elections was once again indecisive, with no party or alliance able to muster a majority. Turnout for the election was 61.97%. BJP once again wins Nineteen seats but Congress also wins seven-seat out of a total of twenty-six seats.

== Results ==
=== Results by Party ===
| Party Name | Popular vote | | | Seats | | |
| Party Name | Votes | % | ±pp | Contested | Won | +/− |
|---|---|---|---|---|---|---|
| BJP | 78,64,750 | 48.28 | | 26 | 19 | |
| INC | 59,45,219 | 36.49 | | 25 | 7 | |
| RJP | 16,63,145 | 10.21 | | 20 | 0 | |
| JD | 4,78,652 | 2.94 | | 15 | 0 | |
| SP | 86,830 | 0.53 | | 9 | 0 | |
| RPI | 21,663 | 0.13 | | 4 | 0 | |
| Others | 47,098 | 0.30 | Steady | 10 | 0 | Steady |
| IND | 1,83,804 | 1.13 | | 30 | 0 | Steady |
| Total | 1,62,91,161 | 100% | - | 139 | 26 | - |

=== Constituency wise ===
| No. | Constituency | Type | Name of Elected M.P. | Party affiliation |
|---|---|---|---|---|
| 1 | Kutch | GEN | Pushpdan Shambhudan Gadhavi | Bharatiya Janata Party |
| 2 | Surendranagar | GEN | Bhavna Dave | Bharatiya Janata Party |
| 3 | Jamnagar | GEN | Chandresh Patel Kordia | Bharatiya Janata Party |
| 4 | Rajkot | GEN | Vallabhbhai Kathiria | Bharatiya Janata Party |
| 5 | Porbandar | GEN | Gordhanbhai Javia | Bharatiya Janata Party |
| 6 | Junagadh | GEN | Bhavna Chikhalia | Bharatiya Janata Party |
| 7 | Amreli | GEN | Dileep Sanghani | Bharatiya Janata Party |
| 8 | Bhavnagar | GEN | Rajendrasinh Rana | Bharatiya Janata Party |
| 9 | Dhandhuka | SC | Ratilal Kalidas Varma | Bharatiya Janata Party |
| 10 | Ahmedabad | GEN | Harin Pathak | Bharatiya Janata Party |
| 11 | Gandhinagar | GEN | Lal Krishna Advani | Bharatiya Janata Party |
| 12 | Mehsana | GEN | A.K. Patel | Bharatiya Janata Party |
| 13 | Patan | SC | Mahesh Kanodia | Bharatiya Janata Party |
| 14 | Banaskantha | GEN | Haribhai Chaudhary | Bharatiya Janata Party |
| 15 | Sabarkantha | GEN | Nisha Chaudhary | Indian National Congress |
| 16 | Kapadvanj | GEN | Jaysinhji Chauhan | Bharatiya Janata Party |
| 17 | Dohad | ST | Damor Somjibhai Punjabhai | Indian National Congress |
| 18 | Godhra | GEN | Shantilal Patel | Indian National Congress |
| 19 | Kaira | GEN | Dinsha Patel | Indian National Congress |
| 20 | Anand | GEN | Ishwarbhai Chavda | Indian National Congress |
| 21 | Chhota Udaipur | ST | Naranbhai Rathwa | Indian National Congress |
| 22 | Baroda | GEN | Jayaben Thakkar | Bharatiya Janata Party |
| 23 | Broach | GEN | Chandubhai Deshmukh | Bharatiya Janata Party |
| 24 | Surat | GEN | Kashiram Rana | Bharatiya Janata Party |
| 25 | Mandvi | ST | Chhitubhai Gamit | Indian National Congress |
| 26 | Bulsar | ST | Manibhai Chaudhary | Bharatiya Janata Party |

== Post-election Union Council of Ministers from Gujarat ==
| # | Name | Constituency | Designation | Department | From | To | Party |
|---|---|---|---|---|---|---|---|
| 1 | L. K. Advani | Gandhinagar | Cabinet Minister | Home Affairs; Department of Jammu and Kashmir Affairs | 19 March 1998 | 13 October 1999 | BJP |
| 2 | Kashiram Rana | Surat | Cabinet Minister | Textiles | 19 March 1998 | 13 October 1999 | BJP |
| 3 | Dr. A. K. Patel | Mehsana | MoS | Chemicals and Fertilizers | 19 March 1998 | 13 October 1999 | BJP |
| 3 | Dr. A. K. Patel | Mehsana | MoS (I/C) | Health and Family Welfare | 16 August 1999 | 13 October 1999 | BJP |
