= Democratic Bahujan Samaj Morcha =

Indian political party

Democratic Bahujan Samaj Morcha (Democratic Majority Society Front) was a political party in India, based in the state of Punjab. DBSM was formed in 1999 as a break-away from Bahujan Samaj Party (BSP) in protest to the alliance of BSP with the Indian National Congress in the state. DBSM was led by Satnam Singh Kainth. DBSM allied themselves with Shiromani Akali Dal and Bharatiya Janata Party (BJP).

In the Lok Sabha elections in 1999 DBSM put up Satnam Singh Kainth as a candidate in Phillaur in Punjab, backed by SAD-BJP. Kainth came second with 236 962 votes (38,61%).

In the state elections in Punjab in 2002 DBSM launched two candidates, backed by SAD-BJP, who got 23 664 (29,86%) and 10 372 votes (13,25%).

DBSM was reunified with BSP in 2004, but important sectors opposed the merger. Those broke away and formed Bharti Lok Lehar Party.
