= Krantikari Manuwadi Morcha =

Political party in India

Krantikari Manuwadi Morcha ("Revolutionary Manuvadi Front", KMM) is a Hindu ultra-conservative political organisation in India, formed in 2000.

In the Uttar Pradesh state assembly elections in 2002 KMM nominated Dara Singh, the accused of the murder of Australian Christian missionary Graham Staines, from the Muzaffarnagar and Ghaziabad constituencies. KMM also openly defended Singh's actions. The nomination sparked protests from the Christian community, and the All India Christian Council demanded that KMM ought to be banned. The nomination was later withdrawn.

In 2012, the Krantikari Manuwadi Morcha along with Utkal Christian Council and Apostolic Churches Alliance approached the Supreme Court to challenge a 2009 Delhi High Court order decriminalising homosexual acts.

== See also ==
- List of political parties in India
