= Third Front (India) =

Political alliances challenging India's two dominant parties

In Indian politics, the Third Front refers to temporary alliances which began in 1989 among smaller parties to offer a third option to Indian voters. These alliances arose to challenge the Indian National Congress (INC) and Bharatiya Janata Party (BJP).

== National Front (1989–1996) ==
The National Front (NF) was a coalition of political parties, led by the Janata Dal, which formed India's government between 1989 and 1990. N. T. Rama Rao was its president, and V. P. Singh was its convener and became the coalition's first and only prime minister. Following a split in the Janata Dal led by Chandra Shekhar, the National Front government lost its majority and fell in November 1990. Shekhar subsequently formed a separate government with outside support from the Indian National Congress (I). Nationally, it was represented by the Janata Dal and the Indian Congress (Socialist). The NF was represented regionally by the Telugu Desam Party in Andhra Pradesh, the Dravida Munnetra Kazhagam in Tamil Nadu and the Asom Gana Parishad in Assam, supported by the non-member Left Front. Leader of the Opposition P. Upendra was a general secretary of the front when it was formed.

In 1991, Jharkhand Mukti Morcha became part of the NF. The Telugu Desam Party split in 1995, with a minority siding with N. T. Rama Rao and the majority siding with Chandrababu Naidu. The NF collapsed before the Lok Sabha elections of 1996, when it tried to include the Dravida Munnetra Kazhagam (DMK) and All India Anna Dravida Munnetra Kazhagam (AIADMK) and the DMK walked out. After Rama Rao's death in January 1996, the Janata Dal stood by his widow Lakshmi Parvathi and the left parties allied with Chandrababu Naidu.

== United Front (1996–1998) ==
After the 1996 elections, Janata Dal, Samajwadi Party, Dravida Munnetra Kazhagam, Telugu Desam Party, Asom Gana Parishad, All India Indira Congress (Tiwari), the Left Front (four parties), Tamil Maanila Congress, the Jammu & Kashmir National Conference and the Maharashtrawadi Gomantak Party formed a 13-party United Front (UF). The coalition formed two governments between 1996 and 1998; the first prime minister was H. D. Deve Gowda from Janata Dal, who was succeeded by I. K. Gujral after Jyoti Basu and V. P. Singh declined the office. Both governments had outside support from the Indian National Congress under Sitaram Kesri. N. Chandrababu Naidu of the Telugu Desam Party was the UF's convener.

The Indian general election of 1996 returned a fractured verdict. With the Bharatiya Janata Party (BJP) emerging as the largest party with 161 of 543 seats, it was invited first to form a government. It accepted the offer, and Atal Bihari Vajpayee was sworn in as prime minister. He could not muster a majority on the house floor, however, and the government fell 13 days later. At a meeting of the other parties, the Indian National Congress (with 140 seats) declined to head the government; with the Communist Party of India (Marxist) (CPI(M)), however, the INC agreed to extend outside support to a United Front coalition with the Janata Dal at its head. Other members of the UF included the Samajwadi Party, Dravida Munnetra Kazhagam, Asom Gana Parishad, Tamil Maanila Congress, Communist Party of India, and Telugu Desam Party.

With approval from the INC and the CPI(M), Chief Minister of Karnataka H. D. Deve Gowda was asked to head the coalition as prime minister after V. P. Singh, Jyoti Basu, Lalu Prasad Yadav, Mulayam Singh Yadav, G. K. Moopanar, and M. Karunanidhi declined. Deve Gowda's term was from June 1, 1996, to April 21, 1997. The INC revoked its support for him amidst discontent over communication between the coalition and the party. It compromised and supported a new government under I. K. Gujral, who was prime minister from April 21, 1997, to March 19, 1998. After the collapse of his government, new elections were called and the United Front lost power.

== Third Front (2009) ==
The CPI(M) led the formation of the Third Front for the 2009 general election. This front was a collection of regional political parties which were not part of UPA or NDA . Parties including the Communist Parties, All India Forward Bloc, Revolutionary Socialist Party (India), BSP, AIADMK, MDMK, PMK, Biju Janata Dal, JD(S), TDP, Peasants' & Workers' Party of India, and other small parties were members of the front. The new alliance held 109 seats before the 2009 election, but won only 82 seats in that election.

== See also ==
- Mahagathbandhan (2019)
- Mahagathbandhan (Bihar)
