= Bharti Lok Lehar Party =

Political party in India

Bharti Lok Lehar Party, political party in the Indian state of Punjab. The party was founded in February 2004, as a break-away from the Bahujan Samaj Party. The founders of BLLP had been leaders of the Democratic Bahujan Samaj Morcha, which had merged with BSP. The party works for the interests of Dalits. The party leader is Manohar Lal Mahey.
