= Rajasthan Vikas Party =

The Rajasthan Vikas Party (RVP) (transl. Rajasthan Development Party) is a political party in the Indian state of Rajasthan. RVP was floated by the former communications minister of the Indian National Congress cabinet Buta Singh.

Rajasthan Vikas Party is the third largest political party in the state of Rajasthan. The party was founded by Harnam Singh Sikarwarin in 1987. The Rajasthan Vikas Party tried to contest in all parliamentary and assembly election in Rajasthan. The party has many active volunteers.

RVP tried to contest the 1998 Rajasthan assembly elections on its own, but failed. Singh later deserted RVP and joined the Indian National Congress.
