= Kisan Vikas Party =

Small political party in the Indian state of Bihar

Kisan Vikas Party (Peasant Development Party) is a small political party in the Indian state of Bihar. It is probably a splinter group from the Bharatiya Janata Party (BJP). It was founded in 1996 by Om Singh Tomar. It aimed to establish a separate state of West Uttar Pradesh. It disbanded after the 1998 election. It is classified as a Registered Unrecognized Political Party (RUPP).
