= All India Muslim Forum =

- Leader: Dr. M.K. Sherwani
- Headquarters: C-177, Sector 'J', Aliganj, Lucknow

All India Muslim Forum is a Muslim political party in India. It is a Registered Unrecognised Party by the Election Commission of India. The forum has collaboration with Communist Party of India (Marxist-Leninist) Liberation. The President is Syed Rafat and the Chairman is Dr. M. K. Sherwani who had been its General Secretary.

In the 1999 Lok Sabha elections AIMF had launched four candidates, who together mustered 10 010 votes. In the 2004 Lok Sabha elections AIMF had fielded six candidates.
