= Hindustan Janata Party =

Indian political party

Hindustan Janata Party (HJP) (India People's Party) is a minor political party in India. It is one of many splinter groups of Janata Dal.

== See also ==
- Janata Party
- List of political parties in India
