= United Tribal Nationalist Liberation Front =

United Tribal Nationalist Liberation Front, a militant outfit in Assam, India, founded in 1984 to support Bodo separatism. UTNLF demands statehood for the Bodo areas.

The UTNLF led a violent campaign during the 1990s against both the Assamese and the Indian military units in the area.
