= United Minorities Front, Assam =

United Minorities Front, Assam was a regional political party in Assam, India. UMFA was set up in 1985 by the All Assam Minority Students' Union, Citizens Rights Preservation Committee (CRPC) and other religious / linguistic minority people of Assam, as a response to the "Assam Agitation" of All Assam Students' Union and the signing of the Assam Accord. The support of UMFA came mainly from Bengali Muslims and Hindus.

The first president of UMFA was Kalipada Sen. The party merged with AIUDF in 2005.

On 13 April 2013, the State Executive Committee has been formed in the State Level Conference held at Lengtisingha in the district of Bongaigaon.

== History ==
UMFA was formed in the year 1985. It contested in the Assembly and general election of 1985, and won 17 MLA and 1 MP seats respectively.
