= Chhattisgarh Mukti Morcha =

Indian political organisation

Chhattisgarh Mukti Morcha (lit. Chhattisgarh Liberation Front) is a political party in the Indian state of Chhattisgarh.

On 3 March 1977, the Chhattisgarh Mines Shramik Sangh (Chhattisgarh Mines Workers' Union) was founded by Shankar Guha Niyogi. In 1982, CMSS formed the CMM as its political front. The CMM was formed to fight for the cultural identity of the region and to improve the condition of workers and peasants. The CMM organised social campaigns against alcohol abuse and started social projects, such as a hospital financed by workers.

Niyogi was murdered in Bhilai, in 1991. In the 1993 Madhya Pradesh Legislative Assembly election, CMM won 1 seat (Dondi Lohara).

In the 2003 Chhattisgarh Legislative Assembly elections, CMM had put up eight candidates, whom together mustered 37,335 votes.
