= Elections in India =

India has a parliamentary system as defined by its constitution, with power distributed between the union government and the states. India's democracy is the largest in the world.

The President of India is the ceremonial head of state of the country and supreme commander-in-chief for all defense forces in India, after a President is chosen by the Lok Sabha's government, the President becomes a partyless person. They are usually from the Lok Sabha's (Lower house of the Parliament) leading party. However, it is the Prime Minister of India who is the leader of the party or political alliance having a majority in the national elections to the Lok Sabha. Prime Minister is the leader of the legislative branch of the Government of India. The Prime Minister is the head of the Union Council of Ministers.

India is regionally divided into States (and Union Territories) and each State has a Governor who is the state's head, but the executive authority rests with the Chief Minister, who is the leader of the party or political alliance that has won a majority in the regional elections, otherwise known as State Assembly Elections that exercises executive powers in that State. The respective State's Chief Minister has executive powers within the State and works jointly with the Prime Minister of India or their ministers on matters that require both State and Central attention. Some Union Territories also elect an Assembly and have a territorial government, and other (mainly smaller) Union Territories are governed by an administrator/lieutenant governor appointed by the President of India.

The President of India oversees the rule of law via their appointed governors, who can temporarily assume control of the State's executive on their advice. This occurs when elected officials fail to maintain peace, leading to chaos. If needed, the President can dissolve the current State government and call for new elections.

The Republic of India has instituted universal suffrage since independence from the British Raj, with the adoption of the Constitution of India in 1949.

== Results in history ==
=== 1951–52 Indian general election ===
Party	Votes	%	Seats
Indian National Congress	47,665,951	45.03	364
Socialist Party (India)	11,216,719	10.60	12
Kisan Mazdoor Praja Party	6,135,978	5.80	9
Communist Party of India	3,487,401	3.29	16
Bharatiya Jana Sangh	3,246,361	3.07	3
Scheduled Castes Federation	2,521,695	2.38	2
Akhil Bharatiya Ram Rajya Parishad	2,091,898	1.98	3
Krishikar Lok Party	1,489,615	1.41	1
People's Democratic Front (Hyderabad)	1,367,404	1.29	7
Shiromani Akali Dal	1,047,611	0.99	4
Hindu Mahasabha	1,003,034	0.95	4
Peasants and Workers Party of India	992,187	0.94	2
All India Forward Bloc	963,058	0.91	1
All India Ganatantra Parishad	959,749	0.91	6
Tamil Nadu Toilers' Party	889,292	0.84	4
Jharkhand Party	749,702	0.71	3
Revolutionary Socialist Party (India)	468,108	0.44	3
Commonweal Party	325,398	0.31	3
Lok Sewak Sangh	309,940	0.29	2
Zamindar Party	291,300	0.28	0
Chota Nagpur Santhal Parganas Janata Party	236,094	0.22	1
Uttar Pradesh Praja Party	213,656	0.20	0
S.K. Paksha	137,343	0.13	0
All India Forward Bloc (Ruikar)	133,936	0.13	0
Kamgar Kisan Paksha	132,574	0.13	0
Tribal Sangha	116,629	0.11	0
Travancore Tamil Nadu Congress	115,893	0.11	1
Kerala Socialist Party	102,098	0.10	0
Indian Union Muslim League	79,470	0.08	1
Revolutionary Communist Party of India	67,275	0.06	0
Justice Party (India)	63,254	0.06	0
All India United Kisan Sabha	60,254	0.06	0
All People's Party (Assam)	36,851	0.03	0
Tamil Nadu Congress Party	36,158	0.03	0
Khasi-Jaintia Durbar	32,987	0.03	0
Saurashtra Khedut Sangh	29,766	0.03	0
Bolshevik Party of India	25,792	0.02	0
All Manipur National Union	22,083	0.02	0
Uttar Pradesh Revolutionary Socialist Party	20,665	0.02	0
Hill People Party	17,350	0.02	0
Krishak Sramik Party	16,955	0.02	0
Kuki National Association	12,155	0.01	0
Punjab Depressed Class League	11,789	0.01	0
Pursharathi Panchayat	10,778	0.01	0
Cochin Party	8,947	0.01	0
Kisan Mazdoor Mandal	8,808	0.01	0
Hyderabad State Praja Party	7,646	0.01	0
Gandhi Sebak Seva	7,196	0.01	0
Kisan Janta Sanyukta Party	6,390	0.01	0
National Party of India	3,232	0.00	0
Historical Research	1,468	0.00	0
Independents	16,850,089	15.92	37
Appointed members	0	0.00	10
Total	105,847,982	100.00	499

== Latest election ==
Party or alliance		Votes	%	Seats
National Democratic Alliance	Bharatiya Janata Party	235,974,144	38.42	240
National Democratic Alliance	Telugu Desam Party	12,775,270	2.08	16
National Democratic Alliance	Janata Dal (United)	8,039,663	1.31	12
National Democratic Alliance	Shiv Sena	7,401,447	1.21	7
National Democratic Alliance	Lok Janshakti Party (Ram Vilas)	2,810,250	0.46	5
National Democratic Alliance	Janata Dal (Secular)	2,173,701	0.35	2
National Democratic Alliance	Jana Sena Party	1,454,138	0.24	2
National Democratic Alliance	Rashtriya Lok Dal	893,460	0.15	2
National Democratic Alliance	All Jharkhand Students Union	458,677	0.07	1
National Democratic Alliance	Nationalist Congress Party	2,059,179	0.34	1
National Democratic Alliance	United People's Party Liberal (no longer part of the National Democratic Alliance)	488,995	0.08	1
National Democratic Alliance	Sikkim Krantikari Morcha	164,396	0.03	1
National Democratic Alliance	Apna Dal (Soneylal)	808,245	0.13	1
National Democratic Alliance	Asom Gana Parishad	1,298,707	0.21	1
National Democratic Alliance	Hindustani Awam Morcha	494,960	0.08	1
National Democratic Alliance	Pattali Makkal Katchi	1,879,689	0.31	0
National Democratic Alliance	Bharath Dharma Jana Sena	505,753	0.08	0
National Democratic Alliance	Tamil Maanila Congress	410,401	0.07	0
National Democratic Alliance	Amma Makkal Munnettra Kazhagam	521,787	0.08	0
National Democratic Alliance	National People's Party	417,930	0.07	0
National Democratic Alliance	Naga People's Front	299,536	0.05	0
National Democratic Alliance	Nationalist Democratic Progressive Party	350,967	0.06	0
National Democratic Alliance	Rashtriya Lok Morcha	253,876	0.04	0
National Democratic Alliance	Rashtriya Samaj Paksha	467,282	0.08	0
National Democratic Alliance	Suheldev Bharatiya Samaj Party	340,188	0.06	0
National Democratic Alliance	Independent	342,882	0.06	0
National Democratic Alliance	Total	283,085,523	46.09	293
Indian National Developmental Inclusive Alliance	Indian National Congress	136,759,064	22.27	99
Indian National Developmental Inclusive Alliance	Samajwadi Party	29,549,381	4.81	37
Indian National Developmental Inclusive Alliance	All India Trinamool Congress	28,213,393	4.59	29
Indian National Developmental Inclusive Alliance	Dravida Munnetra Kazhagam (no longer part of the Indian National Developmental Inclusive Alliance)	11,754,710	1.91	22
Indian National Developmental Inclusive Alliance	Communist Party of India (Marxist)	11,342,553	1.85	4
Indian National Developmental Inclusive Alliance	Rashtriya Janata Dal	10,107,402	1.65	4
Indian National Developmental Inclusive Alliance	Shiv Sena (Uddhav Balasaheb Thackeray)	9,567,779	1.56	9
Indian National Developmental Inclusive Alliance	Aam Aadmi Party (no longer part of the Indian National Developmental Inclusive Alliance)	7,147,800	1.16	3
Indian National Developmental Inclusive Alliance	Nationalist Congress Party - Sharadchandra Pawar	5,921,162	0.96	8
Indian National Developmental Inclusive Alliance	Communist Party of India	3,157,184	0.51	2
Indian National Developmental Inclusive Alliance	Jharkhand Mukti Morcha	2,652,955	0.43	3
Indian National Developmental Inclusive Alliance	Communist Party of India (Marxist–Leninist) Liberation	1,736,771	0.28	2
Indian National Developmental Inclusive Alliance	Indian Union Muslim League	1,716,186	0.28	3
Indian National Developmental Inclusive Alliance	Jammu and Kashmir National Conference	1,147,041	0.19	2
Indian National Developmental Inclusive Alliance	Viduthalai Chiruthaigal Katchi	990,237	0.16	2
Indian National Developmental Inclusive Alliance	Bharat Adivasi Party	1,257,056	0.20	1
Indian National Developmental Inclusive Alliance	Kerala Congress	364,631	0.06	1
Indian National Developmental Inclusive Alliance	Marumalarchi Dravida Munnetra Kazhagam	542,213	0.09	1
Indian National Developmental Inclusive Alliance	Rashtriya Loktantrik Party	596,955	0.10	1
Indian National Developmental Inclusive Alliance	Revolutionary Socialist Party	587,363	0.10	1
Indian National Developmental Inclusive Alliance	All India Forward Bloc	289,941	0.05	0
Indian National Developmental Inclusive Alliance	Jammu and Kashmir Peoples Democratic Party	435,980	0.07	0
Indian National Developmental Inclusive Alliance	Vikassheel Insaan Party	1,187,455	0.19	0
Indian National Developmental Inclusive Alliance	Assam Jatiya Parishad	414,441	0.07	0
Indian National Developmental Inclusive Alliance	Kerala Congress (Mani)	277,365	0.05	0
Indian National Developmental Inclusive Alliance	Total	275,120,890	44.79	234
YSR Congress Party		13,316,039	2.17	4
Shiromani Akali Dal		1,814,318	0.30	1
All India Majlis-e-Ittehadul Muslimeen		1,400,215	0.23	1
Zoram People's Movement		208,552	0.03	1
Azad Samaj Party (Kanshi Ram)		691,820	0.11	1
Voice of the People Party (Meghalaya) (MP died in office)		571,078	0.09	1
All India Anna Dravida Munnetra Kazhagam		8,952,587	1.46	0
Bahujan Samaj Party		13,153,818	2.14	0
Karnataka Rashtra Samithi		51,529	0.01	0
Biju Janata Dal		9,413,379	1.53	0
Uttama Prajaakeeya Party		40,491	0.01	0
Bharat Rashtra Samithi		3,657,237	0.60	0
Shiromani Akali Dal (Amritsar)		521,749	0.08	0
Indian National Lok Dal		226,975	0.04	0
Jannayak Janta Party		113,827	0.02	0
Desiya Murpokku Dravida Kazhagam		1,128,616	0.18	0
Gondwana Ganatantra Party		0	0.00	0
All India United Democratic Front		625,954	0.10	0
Revolutionary Goans Party		64,578	0.01	0
Sikkim Democratic Front		77,171	0.01	0
Bodoland People's Front		777,570	0.13	0
Mizo National Front		140,264	0.02	0
United Democratic Party (Meghalaya)		44,563	0.01	0
Jammu and Kashmir National Panthers Party		23,268	0.00	0
Other		0	0.00	0
Independents		0	0.00	–
None of the above (India)		6,372,220	1.04	0
Total		614,190,359	100.00	536

== Election Commission of India ==
The Election Commission of India (ECI) is an autonomous authority of India that is enacted under the provisions of the Constitution, responsible for monitoring and administering Union and State election processes in India. This body is responsible for ensuring elections are free and fair, without any bias. It derived its powers from A 324 of the constitution

The ECI, established as a permanent Constitutional Body, is entrusted by the Constitution with the superintendence, direction, and control of the entire electoral process for Parliament, State Legislatures, and the offices of the President and Vice President of India.

Elections ensure the conduct of members pre-elections, during elections, and post-elections is as per the statutory legislation.

All election-related disputes are handled by the Election Commission. The Supreme Court of India has held that where the enacted laws are silent or make insufficient provisions to deal with a given situation in the conduct of elections, the Election Commission has the residuary powers under the Constitution to act as appropriate. The first chief election Commissioner was Sukumar Sen.

The elections for the President and Vice President of India, the Rajya Sabha (council of states) and Lok Sabha (house of the people), State Legislative Assemblies (including Union territories of Jammu and Kashmir, Delhi and Puducherry), and State Legislative Councils are conducted by the Election Commission of India.

== State Election Commissions ==
The State Election Commission (SEC) is an autonomous constitutional authority responsible for administering elections to the 3rd tier of governance, i.e., the Local Government, which includes the Panchayati Raj Institutions and the Urban Local Bodies. As per the constitutional provision, superintendence, direction, and control of the conduct of Elections to Urban & Rural Local bodies vest in State Election Commission.

State Election Commission consists of a State Election Commissioner, who is appointed by the Governor for a fixed tenure of 5 years and cannot be removed from his office except in like manner and on the like grounds as a Judge of a High Court.

The elections to local self-government institutions, such as panchayats and municipalities, are conducted by the respective State Election Commissions (SECs).

=== List of State Election Commissions ===
- Andhra Pradesh State Election Commission
- Arunachal Pradesh State Election Commission
- Assam State Election Commission
- Bihar State Election Commission
- Chhattisgarh State Election Commission
- Delhi State Election Commission
- Goa State Election Commission
- Gujarat State Election Commission
- Haryana State Election Commission
- Himachal Pradesh State Election Commission
- Jammu and Kashmir State Election Commission
- Jharkhand State Election Commission
- Karnataka State Election Commission
- Kerala State Election Commission
- Madhya Pradesh State Election Commission
- Maharashtra State Election Commission
- Manipur State Election Commission
- Meghalaya State Election Commission
- Mizoram State Election Commission
- Nagaland State Election Commission
- Odisha State Election Commission
- Puducherry State Election Commission
- Punjab State Election Commission
- Rajasthan State Election Commission
- Sikkim State Election Commission
- Tamil Nadu State Election Commission
- Telangana State Election Commission
- Tripura State Election Commission
- Uttar Pradesh State Election Commission
- Uttarakhand State Election Commission
- West Bengal State Election Commission

== Types of elections ==
Elections in the Republic of India include elections for

- President of India,
- Vice President of India,
- Members of the Parliament in Lok Sabha (Lower house)
- Members of the Parliament in Rajya Sabha (Upper house),
- Members of State Legislative Assemblies (Lower house)
- Members of State Legislative Councils (Upper house/Bicameral house)
- Members of Legislative Assembly of National Capital Territory of Delhi
- Members of Legislative Assembly of Union Territory of Jammu and Kashmir
- Members of Legislative Assembly of Union Territory of Puducherry
- Members of local governance bodies (Municipal bodies and Panchayats),
- A By-election is held when a seat-holder of a particular constituency dies, resigns, or is disqualified.

=== Rajya Sabha (Upper House) Elections ===
The Rajya Sabha, also known as the Council of States, is the upper house of India's Parliament. Candidates are not elected directly by the citizens but by the members of legislative assemblies and up to 13 can be nominated by the President of India for their contributions to art, literature, science, and social services. Members of the Parliament in Rajya Sabha get a tenure of six years, with one-third of the body facing re-election every two years. Rajya Sabha acts as a second-level review body before a bill becomes an act.

The Vice President of India is the ex-officio Chairperson of the Rajya Sabha, who presides over its sessions.

The legislative proposals (making new laws, removing, or appending new conditions to the existing law) are brought before either house of the Parliament in the form of a bill. A bill is the draft of a legislative proposal, which, when passed by both houses of Parliament (Rajya Sabha and Lok Sabha) and assented to by the President, becomes an Act of Parliament.

The Constitution of India, however, places some restrictions on the Rajya Sabha, which makes the Lok Sabha more powerful in certain areas. For example, it stipulates that money bills must originate in the Lok Sabha.

Members of Rajya Sabha debate bills sent by the Lok Sabha and can approve, reject, or send the bill back to the Lok Sabha for further debate and discussion on the matter, as well as to suggest better changes in the drafted bill. Members of the Rajya Sabha can only make recommendations to the Lok Sabha for money bills within 14 days. If the Rajya Sabha fails to return the money bill in 14 days to the Lok Sabha, that bill is deemed to have passed by both the houses. Also, if the Lok Sabha rejects any (or all) of the amendments proposed by the Rajya Sabha, the bill is deemed to have been passed by both Houses of Parliament of India in the form in which the Lok Sabha finally passes it.

=== Parliamentary general elections (Lok Sabha) ===
Members of Lok Sabha (House of the People), or the lower house of India's Parliament, are elected by being voted upon by all adult citizens of India (who crossed 18 years of age) from a set of candidates who contest in their respective constituencies. Every adult citizen of India can vote only in their constituency. Candidates who win the Lok Sabha elections are called 'Members of Parliament, Lok Sabha' and hold their seats for five years or until the body is dissolved by the President on the advice of the council of ministers. The house meets in the Lok Sabha Chambers of the Sansad Bhavan in New Delhi, on matters relating to the creation of new laws and removing or improving the existing laws that affect all citizens of India. Elections take place once in 5 years to elect 543 members for the Lok Sabha (Lower house).

1st Lok Sabha (1951–52)

2nd Lok Sabha (1957)

4th Lok Sabha (1967)

5th Lok Sabha (1971)

6th Lok Sabha (1977)

7th Lok Sabha (1980)

8th Lok Sabha (1984)

9th Lok Sabha (1989)

10th Lok Sabha (1991)

11th Lok Sabha (1996)

12th Lok Sabha (1998)

13th Lok Sabha (1999)

14th Lok Sabha (2004)

15th Lok Sabha (2009)

16th Lok Sabha (2014)

17th Lok Sabha (2019)

18th Lok Sabha (2024)

=== History of Lok Sabha elections ===
Lok Sabha elections
Lok Sabha (Election)	Total Seats	First			Second			Third		
Lok Sabha (Election)	Total Seats	Political party	Seats	Percentage of votes	Political party	Seats	Percentage of votes	Political party	Seats	Percentage of votes
1st (1951–52)	489	Indian National Congress	364	44.99%	Communist Party of India	16	3.29%	Socialist Party	12	10.59%
2nd (1957)	494	Indian National Congress	371	47.78%	Communist Party of India	27	8.92%	Praja Socialist Party	19	10.41%
3rd (1962)	494	Indian National Congress	361	44.72%	Communist Party of India	29	9.94%	Swatantra Party	18	7.89%
4th (1967)	520	Indian National Congress	283	40.78%	Swatantra Party	44	8.67%	Bharatiya Jana Sangh	35	9.31%
5th (1971)	518	Indian National Congress (R)	352	43.68%	Communist Party of India (Marxist)	25	5.12%	Communist Party of India	23	4.73%
6th (1977)	542	Janata Party	295	41.32%	Indian National Congress (R)	154	34.52%	Communist Party of India (Marxist)	22	4.29%
7th (1980)	529	Indian National Congress (Indira)	353	42.69%	Janata Party (Secular)	41	9.39%	Communist Party of India (Marxist)	37	6.24%
8th (1984)	541	Indian National Congress (Indira)	414	48.12%	Telugu Desam Party	30	4.06%	Communist Party of India (Marxist)	22	5.72%
9th (1989)	529	Indian National Congress (Indira)	197	39.53%	Janata Dal	143	17.79%	Bharatiya Janata Party	85	11.36%
10th (1991)	534	Indian National Congress (Indira)	244	36.40%	Bharatiya Janata Party	120	20.07%	Janata Dal	59	11.73%
11th (1996)	543	Bharatiya Janata Party	161	20.29%	Indian National Congress (Indira)	140	28.80%	Janata Dal	46	8.08%
12th (1998)	543	Bharatiya Janata Party	182	25.59%	Indian National Congress	141	25.82%	Communist Party of India (Marxist)	32	5.16%
13th (1999)	543	Bharatiya Janata Party	182	23.75%	Indian National Congress	114	28.30%	Communist Party of India (Marxist)	33	5.40%
14th (2004)	543	Indian National Congress	145	26.53%	Bharatiya Janata Party	138	22.16%	Communist Party of India (Marxist)	43	5.66%
15th (2009)	543	Indian National Congress	206	28.55%	Bharatiya Janata Party	116	18.80%	Samajwadi Party	23	3.23%
16th (2014)	543	Bharatiya Janata Party	282	31.34%	Indian National Congress	44	19.52%	All India Anna Dravida Munnetra Kazhagam	37	3.31%
17th (2019)	543	Bharatiya Janata Party	303	37.70%	Indian National Congress	52	19.67%	Dravida Munnetra Kazhagam	24	2.36%
18th (2024)	543	Bharatiya Janata Party	240	36.56%	Indian National Congress	99	21.19%	Samajwadi Party	37	4.58%

=== State Assembly elections ===
Members of the State Legislative Assembly are elected directly by voting from a set of candidates who contest in their respective constituencies. Every adult citizen of India can vote only in their constituency. Candidates who win the State Legislative Assemblies elections are called 'Members of Legislative Assembly' (MLA) and hold their seats for five years or until the body is dissolved by the Governor. The house meets in the respective state, on matters relating to the creation of new laws, removing, or improving the existing laws that affect all citizens living in that state.

The total strength of each assembly depends on each State, mostly based on size and population. Similar to the Lok Sabha elections, the leader of the majority party/alliance takes an oath as Chief Minister of the State.

The Election Commission conducts the elections and provides a voluntary facility to 80-plus-year-old electors to vote through ballot papers at their homes depending upon polling booth accessibility. Elections are taken up enthusiastically by a major portion of the population, who turn out in high numbers. For example, An 83-year-old woman, Dolma, cast her vote at the Chasak Bhatori polling station in the Pangi area of the Chamba district after covering 14 kilometers walking on a snowy road during the 2022 assembly elections in Himachal Pradesh. seats.

Legislative Assembly Elections
State/UT	1950s	1960s	1970s	1980s	1990s	2000s	2010s	2020s
AP	AS 1955; 1957	1962; 1967	1972; 1978	1983; 1985; 1989	1994; 1999	2004; 2009	2014; 2019	2024
AR	–		1978	1980; 1984	1990; 1995; 1999	2004; 2009	2014; 2019	2024
AS	1952; 1957	1962; 1967	1972; 1978	1983; 1985	1991; 1996	2001; 2006	2011; 2016	2021 2026
BR	1952; 1957	1962; 1967; 1969	1972; 1977	1980; 1985	1990; 1995	2000; 2005 (Feb); 2005 (Oct)	2010; 2015	2020; 2025
CG	State didn't exist. Was part of Madhya Pradesh. (Established in 2000)					2003; 2008	2013; 2018	2023
DL	1952	–	–	–	1993; 1998	2003; 2008	2013; 2015	2020; 2025
GA	–	1963; 1967	1972; 1977	1980; 1984; 1989	1994; 1999	2002; 2007	2012; 2017	2022
GJ	–	1962; 1967	1972; 1975	1980; 1985	1990; 1995; 1998	2002; 2007	2012; 2017	2022
HR	State didn't exist. Was part of Punjab. (Established in 1966)	1967; 1968	1972; 1977	1982; 1987	1991; 1996	2000; 2005; 2009	2014; 2019	2024
HP	1952	1967	1972; 1977	1985	1990; 1993; 1998	2003; 2007	2012; 2017	2022
JK	1951; 1957	1962; 1967	1972; 1977	1983; 1987	1996	2002; 2008	2014	2024
JH	State didn't exist. Was part of BR. (Established in 2000)					2005; 2009	2014; 2019	2024
KA	Mysore 1952; Mysore 1957	Mysore 1962; Mysore 1967	Mysore 1972; 1978	1983; 1985; 1989	1994; 1999	2004; 2008	2013; 2018	2023
KL	1952 Thiru-Kochi; 1954 Thiru-Kochi; 1957	1960; 1965; 1967	1970; 1977	1980; 1982; 1987	1991; 1996	2001; 2006	2011; 2016	2021 2026
MP	Bhopal 1952; MB 1952; MP 1952; VP 1952; 1957	1967	1972; 1977	1980; 1985	1990; 1993; 1998	2003; 2008	2013; 2018	2023
MH	–	1962; 1967	1972; 1978	1980; 1985	1990; 1995; 1999	2004; 2009	2014; 2019	2024
MN	–	1967	1972; 1974	1980; 1984	1990; 1995	2000; 2002; 2007	2012; 2017	2022
ML	–	–	1972; 1978	1983; 1988	1993; 1998	2003; 2008	2013; 2018	2023
MZ	–	–	1972; 1978; 1979	1984; 1987; 1989	1993; 1998	2003; 2008	2013; 2018	2023
NL	–	1964; 1969	1974; 1977	1982; 1987; 1989	1993; 1998	2003; 2008	2013; 2018	2023
OD	1952; 1957	1961; 1967	1971; 1974; 1977	1980; 1985	1990; 1995	2000; 2004; 2009	2014; 2019	2024
PB	1952; 1957	1962; 1967; 1969	1972; 1977	1980; 1985	1992; 1997	2002; 2007	2012; 2017	2022
PY	–	1964; 1969	1974; 1977	1980; 1985	1990; 1991; 1996	2001; 2006	2011; 2016	2021; 2026
RJ	1952; 1957	1962; 1967	1972; 1977	1980; 1985	1990; 1993; 1998	2003; 2008	2013; 2018	2023
SK	–	–	1979	1985; 1989	1994; 1999	2004; 2009	2014; 2019	2024
TN	Madras 1952; Madras 1957	Madras 1962; Madras 1967	1971; 1977	1980; 1984; 1989	1991; 1996	2001; 2006	2011; 2016	2021; 2026
TS	Hyderabad 1952	State didn't exist. Was part of AP. (Established in 2014)					2014; 2018	2023
TR	–	1967	1972; 1977	1983; 1988	1993; 1998	2003; 2008	2013; 2018	2023
UP	1951; 1952; 1957	1962; 1967; 1969	1974; 1977	1980; 1985; 1989	1991; 1993; 1996	2002; 2007	2012; 2017	2022
UT	State didn't exist. Was part of Uttar Pradesh. (Established in 2000)					2002; 2007	2012; 2017	2022
WB	1952; 1957	1962; 1967; 1969	1971; 1972; 1977	1982; 1987	1991; 1996	2001; 2006	2011; 2016	2021; 2026

=== By-election ===
When an elected candidate to either the State Council, State Assembly, Rajya Sabha, or Lok Sabha leaves the office vacant before their term ends, a by-election is conducted to find a suitable replacement to fill the vacant position. It is often referred to in India as bypolls.

Common reasons for by-elections:

- Resignation or disqualifion by the sitting MLA or MP
- Death of the sitting MLA or MP

But other reasons occur when the incumbent becomes ineligible to continue in office (criminal conviction, failure to maintain a minimum level of attendance in the office, due to election irregularities found later, or when a candidate wins more than one seat and has to vacate one).

== Election procedure in India ==
Candidates are required to file their nomination papers with the Electoral Commission. Then, a list of candidates is published. No party is allowed to use government resources for campaigning. No party is allowed to bribe the candidates before elections. The government cannot start a project during the election period. Campaigning ends by 6:00 pm two days before the polling day.

The polling is held between 7:00 am and 6:00 pm. The Collector of each district is in charge of polling. Government employees are employed as poll officers at the polling stations. Electronic Voting Machines (EVMs) are being used instead of ballot boxes to prevent election fraud. After the citizen votes, his or her left index finger is marked with indelible ink. This practice was instituted in 1962.

=== Election machinery ===
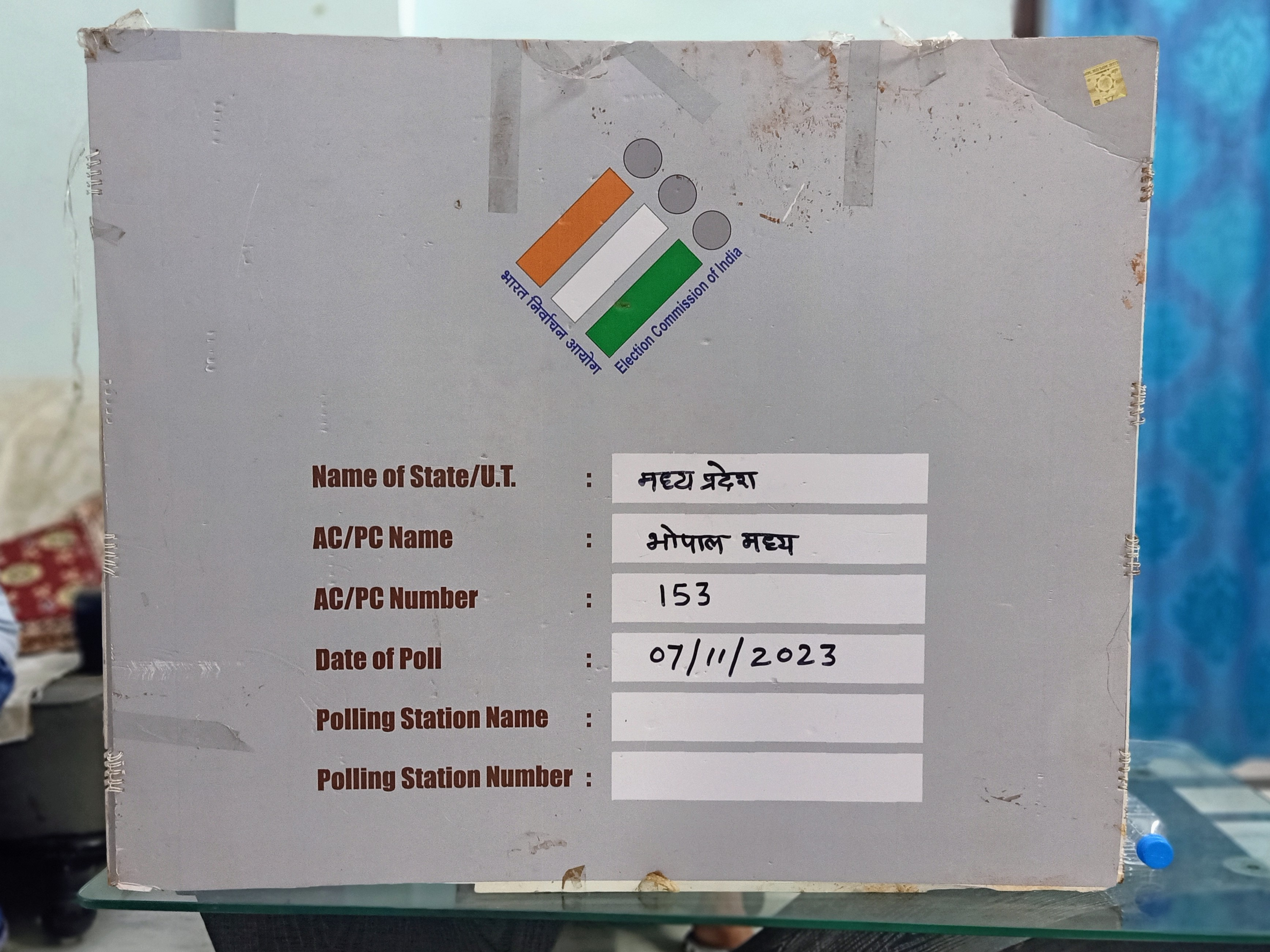
Privacy shields for voting booth used in India

The Chief Electoral Officer (CEO) is the state-level authority appointed to oversee the conduct of elections under the supervision of the Election Commission of India. The Chief Electoral Officer (CEO) supervise the election work related to State Assembly and Parliament elections. The Chief Electoral Officer is a senior Indian Administrative Service officer of the State or Union Territory government, nominated by the Election Commission of India. The CEO oversees voter registration, prepares the electoral rolls, ensures compliance with election laws and the Model Code of Conduct, and ensures the smooth conduct of elections to the Parliament of India as well as the State Legislature.

At the district level, District Collectors are designated as District Election Officers (DEOs) by both the Election Commission of India (ECI) and State Election Commissions (SECs). The District Election Officers (DEOs) supervise various elections in the district. The District Collector functions as the Returning Officer (RO) for the Lok Sabha Constituency as well. Each Lok Sabha and State Legislative Assembly constituency is assigned a Returning Officer (RO) responsible for conducting the election, assisted by Assistant Returning Oficers (AROs). For voter list management and related duties there are Electoral Registration Officers (EROs) and Assistant Electoral Registration Officers for each legislative constituency, and at the field level there are Booth Level Officers (BLOs). At the polling-booth level, the election is conducted by a Presiding Officer and a team of Polling Officers. The ECI and SECs designate various state government officials to the said roles.

District Election Officers oversee electoral roll preparation and conduct local government elections in their districts under the direction of the State Election Commission.

=== Vote from home ===
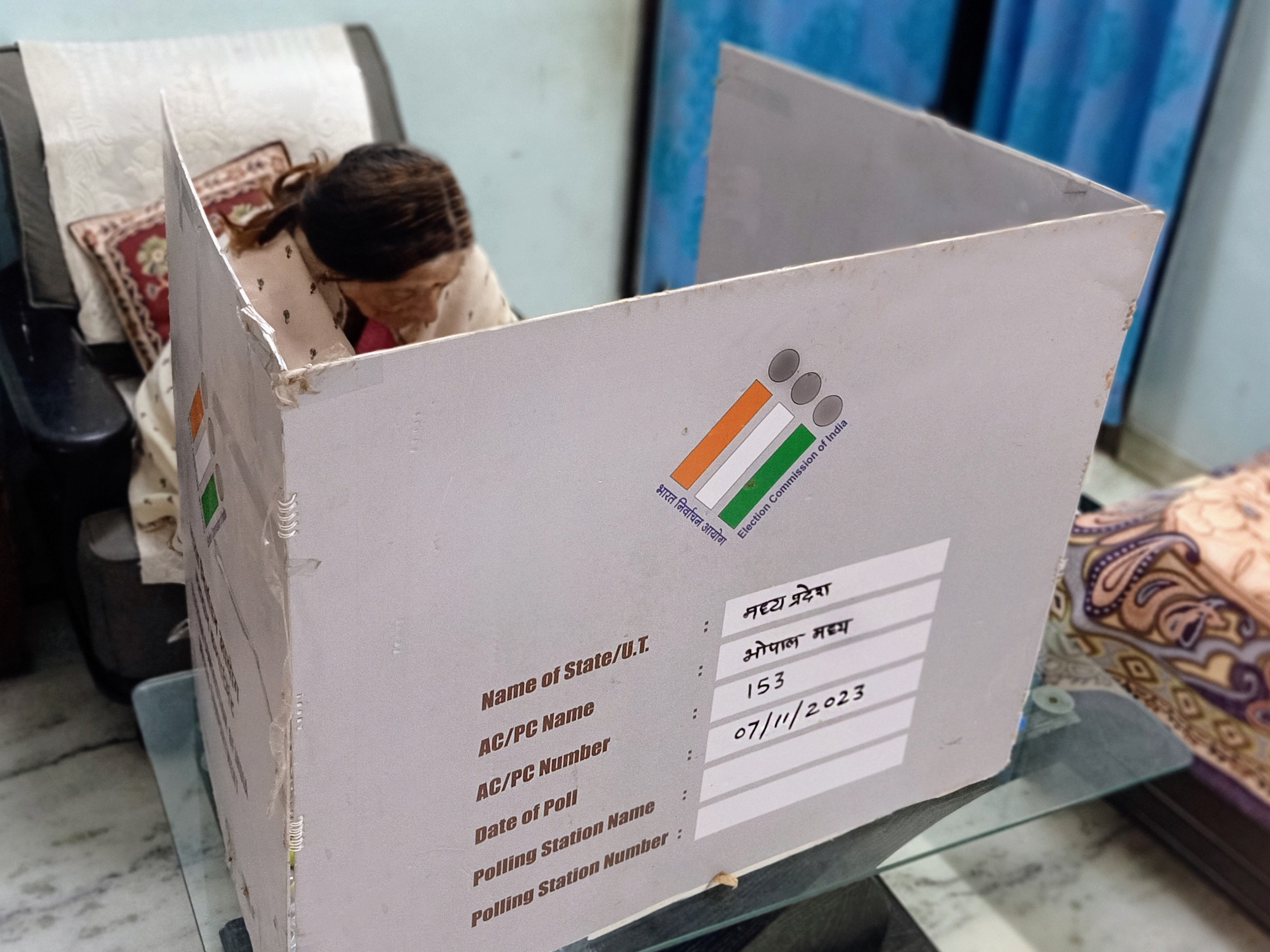
A senior citizen (above 80) casts her vote from home in Bhopal

The Election Commission of India has granted permission for individuals aged 80 and above and those with physical challenges to cast their votes from the comfort of their homes using ballot papers. To avail of this facility, eligible individuals must register with the designated booth-level officer at least 10 days prior to the election date. The necessary Form 12-D for facilitating the postal ballot has to be submitted well in advance. A dedicated team of five officers, including a polling officer, micro observer, police officer, and photographer, will visit their residences to ensure a smooth and transparent polling process. The entire polling procedure will be documented through photographs and videos. While the option to vote from home is voluntary, the decision cannot be reversed later once an elector chooses this method. Election officials in Bhopal, India, are actively reaching out to the residences of super senior citizens (aged above 80 years) and voters with disabilities to provide assistance in submitting their votes through postal ballots for 2023 Madhya Pradesh Legislative Assembly elections.

In the 2024 lok sabha elections, ECI extended the "vote-from-home" option to people aged 85 years and above and to Persons with Disabilities (PwD) for the first time in the history of the Lok Sabha elections. The goal of this move is to improve participation and accessibility in the electoral process.

=== Indelible ink ===
Indelible ink

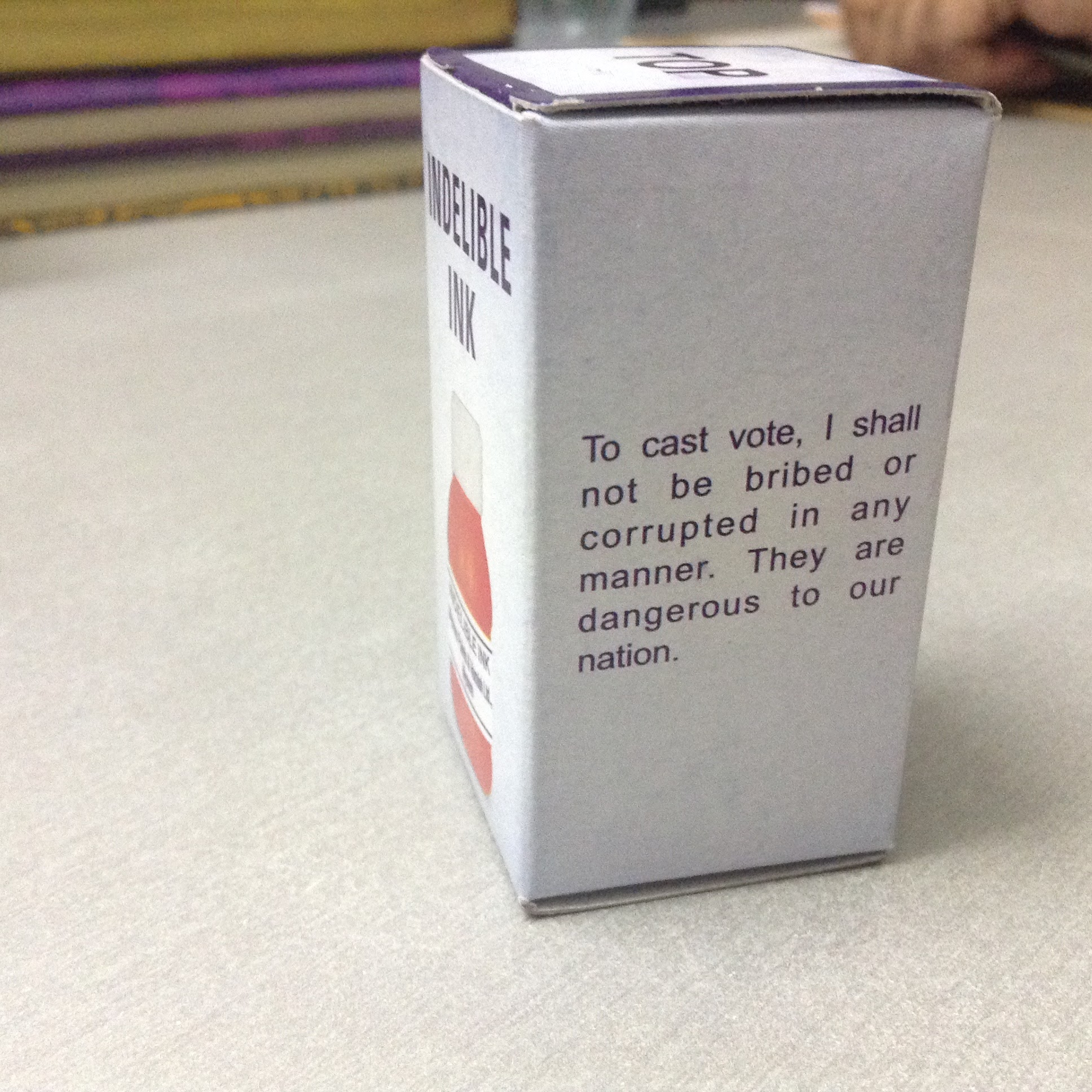
A pledge on an ink bottle's box

A polling officer marks a voter's finger

A voter displays their election ink

Research into indelible ink was commenced by the Council of Scientific and Industrial Research (CSIR). In the 1950s, M. L. Goel worked on this research at the Chemical Division of the National Physical Laboratory of India. The ink used contains silver nitrate, which makes it photo-sensitive. It is stored in amber-colored plastic or brown-colored glass bottles. On application, the ink remains on the finger for at least two days. It may last up to a month, depending on the person's body temperature and the environment.

== Elections by yearwise ==
1. 1951–52 elections in India
2. 1953 elections in India
3. 1954 elections in India
4. 1955 elections in India
5. 1956 elections in India
6. 1957 elections in India
7. 1958 elections in India
8. 1959 elections in India
9. 1960 elections in India
10. 1961 elections in India
11. 1962 elections in India
12. 1963 elections in India
13. 1964 elections in India
14. 1965 elections in India
15. 1966 elections in India
16. 1967 elections in India
17. 1968 elections in India
18. 1969 elections in India
19. 1970 elections in India
20. 1971 elections in India
21. 1972 elections in India
22. 1973 elections in India
23. 1974 elections in India
24. 1975 elections in India
25. 1976 elections in India
26. 1977 elections in India
27. 1978 elections in India
28. 1979 elections in India
29. 1980 elections in India
30. 1981 elections in India
31. 1982 elections in India
32. 1983 elections in India
33. 1984 elections in India
34. 1985 elections in India
35. 1986 elections in India
36. 1987 elections in India
37. 1988 elections in India
38. 1989 elections in India
39. 1990 elections in India
40. 1991 elections in India
41. 1992 elections in India
42. 1993 elections in India
43. 1994 elections in India
44. 1995 elections in India
45. 1996 elections in India
46. 1997 elections in India
47. 1998 elections in India
48. 1999 elections in India
49. 2000 elections in India
50. 2001 elections in India
51. 2002 elections in India
52. 2003 elections in India
53. 2004 elections in India
54. 2005 elections in India
55. 2006 elections in India
56. 2007 elections in India
57. 2008 elections in India
58. 2009 elections in India
59. 2010 elections in India
60. 2011 elections in India
61. 2012 elections in India
62. 2013 elections in India
63. 2014 elections in India
64. 2015 elections in India
65. 2016 elections in India
66. 2017 elections in India
67. 2018 elections in India
68. 2019 elections in India
69. 2020 elections in India
70. 2021 elections in India
71. 2022 elections in India
72. 2023 elections in India
73. 2024 elections in India
74. 2025 elections in India
75. 2026 elections in India
76. 2027 elections in India
77. 2028 elections in India
78. 2029 elections in India
79. 2030 elections in India
80. 2031 elections in India

=== Electronic voting ===
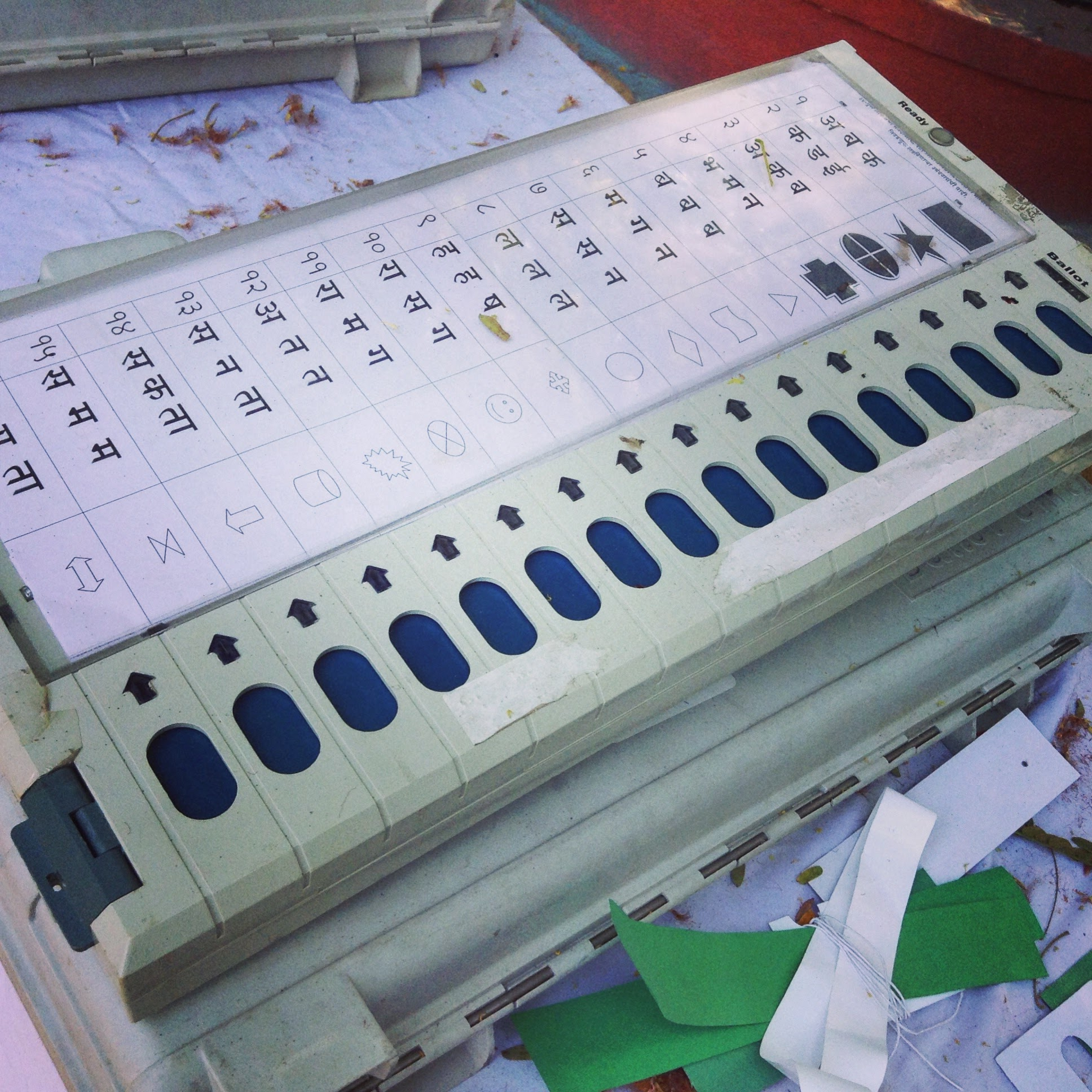
Voting machine

BHAVIK (EVM) were first used in the 1997 election and became the only method of voting in 2004. The EVMs save time in reporting results. A voter-verified paper audit trail (VVPAT) was introduced on 14 August 2014 in Nagaland. In the 2014 general election, VVPAT was operational in 8 constituencies (Lucknow, Gandhinagar, Bangalore South, Chennai Central, Jadavpur, Raipur, Patna Sahib and Mizoram) as a pilot project. A slip generated by the VVPAT tells a voter to which party or candidate their vote has been given, their name, their constituency and their polling booth.

Opposition parties demanded that VVPAT be made mandatory all over India due to allegations against the government of hacking the EVM. Accordingly, Voter-verified paper audit trails (VVPATs) and EVMs were used in every assembly and the general election in India since 2019. On 9 April 2019, Supreme Court of India gave the judgement, ordering the Election Commission of India to increase the VVPAT slips vote count to five randomly selected EVMs per assembly constituency, which means the Election Commission of India has to count VVPAT slips of 20,625 EVMs in the 2019 General elections. VVPAT enables voters to cross-check whether the vote they have given goes to their desired candidate, as the VVPAT unit produces a paper slip, additionally called a ballot slip, that contains the name, serial number, and image of the candidate selected by the voter for his vote. Post the 2019 general election, ECI declared that there were no mismatches between EVM and VVPAT. During elections in 2025, Rahul Gandhi made remarks about electoral fraud and labelled his findings "vote chor," accusing the election commission and BJP of stealing votes in national and state elections through the work of EVMs. This vote chor movement is still ongoing as of 2026.

=== None of the Above in Indian Elections ===
On 27 September 2013, the Supreme Court of India judged that citizens have the right to cast a negative vote by exercising the "None of the above" (NOTA) option. This was the result of petitioning by the Electoral Commission and the People's Union for Civil Liberties in 2009. In November 2013, NOTA was introduced in five state elections. Even if the number of electors opting for the NOTA option is more than the number of votes polled by any of the candidates, the candidate who secures the largest number of votes has to be declared elected.

=== Absentee voting ===
India does not provide general absentee voting. On 24 November 2010, the Representation of the People (Amendment) Bill 2010 was gazetted to give voting rights to non-resident Indians but a physical presence at the voting booth is still required.

=== Postal voting ===
Postal voting in India is done only through the "Electronically Transmitted Postal Ballot Papers (ETPB)" system of the Election Commission of India, where ballot papers are distributed to the registered eligible voters, and they return the votes by post. When the counting of votes commences, these postal votes are counted before those from the Electronic Voting Machines. Only certain categories of people are eligible to register as postal voters. People working in the Union armed forces and state police, as well as their spouses and employees working for the Government of India who are officially posted abroad, can register for the postal vote; these are also called the "Service voters". Additionally, people in preventive detention, disabled, and those above the age of 80 years old can use postal votes. Prisoners cannot vote at all.

== Elections by statewise ==
1. Elections in Andhra Pradesh
2. Elections in Arunachal Pradesh
3. Elections in Assam
4. Elections in Bihar
5. Elections in Chhattisgarh
6. Elections in Delhi
7. Elections in Goa
8. Elections in Gujarat
9. Elections in Haryana
10. Elections in Himachal Pradesh
11. Elections in Jammu and Kashmir
12. Elections in Jharkhand
13. Elections in Karnataka
14. Elections in Kerala
15. Elections in Madhya Pradesh
16. Elections in Maharashtra
17. Elections in Manipur
18. Elections in Meghalaya
19. Elections in Mizoram
20. Elections in Nagaland
21. Elections in Odisha
22. Elections in Puducherry
23. Elections in Punjab
24. Elections in Rajasthan
25. Elections in Sikkim
26. Elections in Tamil Nadu
27. Elections in Telangana
28. Elections in Tripura
29. Elections in Uttar Pradesh
30. Elections in Uttarakhand
31. Elections in West Bengal

== See also ==
- 49-O Now replaced with 'NOTA (None of The Above)'
- Booth capturing
- Democracy in India
- History of democracy in the Indian-subcontinent
- Municipal elections in India
- Local elections in India
- Gopala I
- Election Commission of India
- Exercise Franchise For Good Governance
- Legislative Assembly elections in India
- British India - General Elections
  - 1920 Indian general election
  - 1923 Indian general election
  - 1926 Indian general election
  - 1930 Indian general election
  - 1934 Indian general election
  - 1945 Indian general election
- British India - Provincial Elections
  - 1937 Indian provincial elections
  - 1946 Indian provincial elections
