= List of Indian state legislative assembly elections =

State Legislative Assembly Elections
- Direct elections to state and union territory legislatures in India
- The Election Commission of India administers elections to the legislative assemblies of India's states and certain union territories.
- Country: India
- Elected body: Legislative Assembly (Vidhan Sabha)
- Type: State legislative assembly elections
- Electoral system: First-past-the-post (FPTP)
- Frequency: Every five years (unless dissolved earlier)
- Constitutional basis: Article 170 of the Constitution of India
- Electoral authority: Election Commission of India (ECI)
- Total constituencies: 4,123 across 28 states and 3 union territories
- Voter eligibility: Universal adult franchise (Indian citizens aged 18 years or above)
- Voting method: Electronic Voting Machines (EVMs) with VVPAT

State legislative assembly elections in India are the direct elections held to elect members of the Legislative Assemblies (Vidhan Sabhas) of the states and certain union territories of India. These elections are conducted under the framework of the Constitution of India, principally Article 170, and are administered by the independent Election Commission of India (ECI). Members elected to the assemblies are known as Members of the Legislative Assembly (MLAs) and ordinarily serve a five-year term unless the assembly is dissolved earlier in accordance with constitutional provisions.

Legislative assembly elections are held in all 28 states of India and in the three union territories possessing elected legislatures: Delhi, Jammu and Kashmir, and Puducherry. Six states—Andhra Pradesh, Bihar, Karnataka, Maharashtra, Telangana, and Uttar Pradesh—have bicameral legislatures consisting of a Legislative Assembly (Vidhan Sabha) and a Legislative Council (Vidhan Parishad), while the remaining states and the three union territories have unicameral legislatures.

Members are elected from single-member territorial constituencies using the first-past-the-post electoral system through Electronic Voting Machines (EVMs) supported by Voter Verifiable Paper Audit Trail (VVPAT) units. MLAs are responsible for forming the state government, electing the Chief Minister, holding the executive accountable, enacting state legislation on subjects contained in the State List and Concurrent List of the Seventh Schedule to the Constitution, approving the state budget, and representing their respective constituencies.

India has 4,123 legislative assembly constituencies distributed across the 28 states and the three union territories with legislative assemblies. This article lists all elections conducted to the legislative assemblies of the states and union territories of India since the commencement of the Constitution in 1950.

== Elections by yearwise ==
1. 1951-52 elections in India
2. 1953 elections in India
3. 1954 elections in India
4. 1955 elections in India
5. 1956 elections in India
6. 1957 elections in India
7. 1958 elections in India
8. 1959 elections in India
9. 1960 elections in India
10. 1961 elections in India
11. 1962 elections in India
12. 1963 elections in India
13. 1964 elections in India
14. 1965 elections in India
15. 1966 elections in India
16. 1967 elections in India
17. 1968 elections in India
18. 1969 elections in India
19. 1970 elections in India
20. 1971 elections in India
21. 1972 elections in India
22. 1973 elections in India
23. 1974 elections in India
24. 1975 elections in India
25. 1976 elections in India
26. 1977 elections in India
27. 1978 elections in India
28. 1979 elections in India
29. 1980 elections in India
30. 1981 elections in India
31. 1982 elections in India
32. 1983 elections in India
33. 1984 elections in India
34. 1985 elections in India
35. 1986 elections in India
36. 1987 elections in India
37. 1988 elections in India
38. 1989 elections in India
39. 1990 elections in India
40. 1991 elections in India
41. 1992 elections in India
42. 1993 elections in India
43. 1994 elections in India
44. 1995 elections in India
45. 1996 elections in India
46. 1997 elections in India
47. 1998 elections in India
48. 1999 elections in India
49. 2000 elections in India
50. 2001 elections in India
51. 2002 elections in India
52. 2003 elections in India
53. 2004 elections in India
54. 2005 elections in India
55. 2006 elections in India
56. 2007 elections in India
57. 2008 elections in India
58. 2009 elections in India
59. 2010 elections in India
60. 2011 elections in India
61. 2012 elections in India
62. 2013 elections in India
63. 2014 elections in India
64. 2015 elections in India
65. 2016 elections in India
66. 2017 elections in India
67. 2018 elections in India
68. 2019 elections in India
69. 2020 elections in India
70. 2021 elections in India
71. 2022 elections in India
72. 2023 elections in India
73. 2024 elections in India
74. 2025 elections in India
75. 2026 elections in India
76. 2027 elections in India
77. 2028 elections in India
78. 2029 elections in India

== Current legislative assemblies in India ==
State/ Union Territory	Last Elections Held	Result Date	Largest/ Majority Party	Government
Andhra Pradesh	2024	4 June 2024	TDP	National Democratic Alliance
Arunachal Pradesh	2024	2 June 2024	BJP	National Democratic Alliance
Assam	2026	4 May 2026	BJP	National Democratic Alliance
Bihar	2025	14 November 2025	BJP	National Democratic Alliance
Chhattisgarh	2023	3 December 2023	BJP	National Democratic Alliance
Goa	2022	10 March 2022	BJP	National Democratic Alliance
Gujarat	2022	8 December 2022	BJP	National Democratic Alliance
Haryana	2024	8 October 2024	BJP	National Democratic Alliance
Himachal Pradesh	2022	8 December 2022	INC	Indian National Developmental Inclusive Alliance
Jharkhand	2024	23 November 2024	JMM	Indian National Developmental Inclusive Alliance
Karnataka	2023	13 May 2023	INC	Indian National Developmental Inclusive Alliance
Kerala	2026	4 May 2026	INC	Indian National Developmental Inclusive Alliance
Madhya Pradesh	2023	3 December 2023	BJP	National Democratic Alliance
Maharashtra	2024	23 November 2024	BJP	National Democratic Alliance
Manipur	2022	10 March 2022	BJP	National Democratic Alliance
Meghalaya	2023	2 March 2023	NPP	National Democratic Alliance
Mizoram	2023	4 December 2023	ZPM	Zoram People's Movement
Nagaland	2023	2 March 2023	NPF	National Democratic Alliance
Odisha	2024	4 June 2024	BJP	National Democratic Alliance
Punjab	2022	10 March 2022	AAP	Others
Rajasthan	2023	3 December 2023	BJP	National Democratic Alliance
Sikkim	2024	2 June 2024	SKM	National Democratic Alliance
Tamil Nadu	2026	4 May 2026	TVK	Indian National Developmental Inclusive Alliance
Telangana	2023	3 December 2023	INC	Indian National Developmental Inclusive Alliance
Tripura	2023	2 March 2023	BJP	National Democratic Alliance
Uttar Pradesh	2022	10 March 2022	BJP	National Democratic Alliance
Uttarakhand	2022	10 March 2022	BJP	National Democratic Alliance
West Bengal	2026	4 May 2026	BJP	National Democratic Alliance
Delhi ^{*}	2025	8 February 2025	BJP	National Democratic Alliance
Jammu and Kashmir ^{*}	2024	8 October 2024	JKNC	Indian National Developmental Inclusive Alliance
Puducherry ^{*}	2026	4 May 2026	AINRC	National Democratic Alliance

^{*} Union territory

== Legislative Assembly elections by years ==
Legislative Assembly Elections
State/UT	1950s	1960s	1970s	1980s	1990s	2000s	2010s	2020s
AP	AS 1955; 1957	1962; 1967	1972; 1978	1983; 1985; 1989	1994; 1999	2004; 2009	2014; 2019	2024
AR	–	–	1978	1980; 1984	1990; 1995; 1999	2004; 2009	2014; 2019	2024
AS	1952; 1957	1962; 1967	1972; 1978	1983; 1985	1991; 1996	2001; 2006	2011; 2016	2021; 2026
BR	1952; 1957	1962; 1967; 1969	1972; 1977	1980; 1985	1990; 1995	2000; 2005 (Feb); 2005 (Oct)	2010; 2015	2020; 2025
CG	State didn't exist. Was part of MP. (Established in 2000)					2003; 2008	2013; 2018	2023
GA	–	1963; 1967	1972; 1977	1980; 1984; 1989	1994; 1999	2002; 2007	2012; 2017	2022
GJ	–	1962; 1967	1972; 1975	1980; 1985	1990; 1995; 1998	2002; 2007	2012; 2017	2022
HR	–	1967; 1968	1972; 1977	1982; 1987	1991; 1996	2000; 2005; 2009	2014; 2019	2024
HP	1952	1967	1972; 1977	1985	1990; 1993; 1998	2003; 2007	2012; 2017	2022
JH	State didn't exist. Was part of Bihar. (Established in 2000)					2005; 2009	2014; 2019	2024
KA	Mysore 1952; Mysore 1957	Mysore 1962; Mysore 1967	Mysore 1972; 1978	1983; 1985; 1989	1994; 1999	2004; 2008	2013; 2018	2023
KL	1952 Thiru-Kochi; 1954 Thiru-Kochi; 1957	1960; 1965; 1967	1970; 1977	1980; 1982; 1987	1991; 1996	2001; 2006	2011; 2016	2021; 2026
MP	Bhopal 1952; MB 1952; MP 1952; VP 1952; 1957	1962; 1967	1972; 1977	1980; 1985	1990; 1993; 1998	2003; 2008	2013; 2018	2023
MH	–	1962; 1967	1972; 1978	1980; 1985	1990; 1995; 1999	2004; 2009	2014; 2019	2024
MN	–	1967	1972; 1974	1980; 1984	1990; 1995	2000; 2002; 2007	2012; 2017	2022
ML	–	–	1972; 1978	1983; 1988	1993; 1998	2003; 2008	2013; 2018	2023
MZ	–	–	1972; 1978; 1979	1984; 1987; 1989	1993; 1998	2003; 2008	2013; 2018	2023
NL	–	1964; 1969	1974; 1977	1982; 1987; 1989	1993; 1998	2003; 2008	2013; 2018	2023
OD	1952; 1957	1961; 1967	1971; 1974; 1977	1980; 1985	1990; 1995	2000; 2004; 2009	2014; 2019	2024
PB	1952; 1957	1962; 1967; 1969	1972; 1977	1980; 1985	1992; 1997	2002; 2007	2012; 2017	2022
RJ	1952; 1957	1962; 1967	1972; 1977	1980; 1985	1990; 1993; 1998	2003; 2008	2013; 2018	2023
SK	–	–	1979	1985; 1989	1994; 1999	2004; 2009	2014; 2019	2024
TN	Madras 1952; Madras 1957	Madras 1962; Madras 1967	1971; 1977	1980; 1984; 1989	1991; 1996	2001; 2006	2011; 2016	2021; 2026
TG	Hyderabad 1952	Steady					2014; 2018	2023
TR	–	1967	1972; 1977	1983; 1988	1993; 1998	2003; 2008	2013; 2018	2023
UP	1951; 1952; 1957	1962; 1967; 1969	1974; 1977	1980; 1985; 1989	1991; 1993; 1996	2002; 2007	2012; 2017	2022
UT	State didn't exist. Was part of UP. (Established in 2000)					2002; 2007	2012; 2017	2022
WB	1952; 1957	1962; 1967; 1969	1971; 1972; 1977	1982; 1987	1991; 1996	2001; 2006	2011; 2016	2021; 2026
DL	1952	–	–	–	1993; 1998	2003; 2008	2013; 2015	2020; 2025
JK	1951; 1957	1962; 1967	1972; 1977	1983; 1987	1996	2002; 2008	2014	2024
PY	–	1964; 1969	1974; 1977	1980; 1985	1990; 1991; 1996	2001; 2006	2011; 2016	2021; 2026

== See also ==
- Election Commission of India
- Elections in India
- List of Indian presidential elections
- List of Indian vice presidential elections
- List of Rajya Sabha elections
- List of Indian general elections
- State governments of India
- State Legislature
- State legislative assemblies of India
- Member of the Legislative Assembly
- Federalism in India
