= 1964 elections in India =

Elections in India
- 1964

== Legislative Assembly elections ==
Legislative Assembly elections in India were conducted for Nagaland Legislative Assembly and Puducherry Legislative Assembly in 1964.

=== Nagaland ===
Nagaland was granted the statehood on 1 December 1963, and the first state assembly elections were held on January 10–16, 1964. Naga Nationalist Organization (NNO) won 33 out of 46 seats in the Legislative Assembly. The National Democratic Party (NDP) won 11 seats in the Legislative Assembly.

| Party | Votes | % | Seats |
|---|---|---|---|
| Independents | 62,175 | 100.00 | 40 |
| Total | 62,175 | 100.00 | 40 |
| Valid votes | 62,175 | 99.13 | |
| Invalid/blank votes | 544 | 0.87 | |
| Total votes | 62,719 | 100.00 | |
| Registered voters/turnout | 124,166 | 50.51 | |
Source: ECI

=== Puducherry ===
Elections to the Legislative Assembly of the Indian Union Territory of Pondicherry took place on 23 August 1964. These were the first Legislative Assembly elections after the formation of the new Union Territory. 21 seats were won by Indian National Congress while rest of the seats were won by Independents and others.

The results of 1964 election were summarized below:

| Parties and Coalitions | Won | Votes | Vote % | Change |
|---|---|---|---|---|
| Indian National Congress | 22 (Note: One candidate elected uncontested) | 91,338 | 54.3 | ▲1 |
| People's Front | 4 | 30,495 | 31.6 | ▼9 |
| Independents | 4 | 46,218 | 27.5 | ▼1 |

== See also ==
- 1962 elections in India
