= 1979 elections in India =

Elections in India
← 1978	1979	1980 →

Elections in the Republic of India in 1979 included elections to two state legislative assemblies, elections to the Indian Rajya Sabha and for the post of the vice-president.

== Overall result ==
Date(s)	State	Government before	Chief Minister before	Government after	Elected Chief Minister	Maps
24 and 27 April 1979	Mizoram	Mizoram People's Conference	T. Sailo	Mizoram People's Conference	T. Sailo	
12 October 1979	Sikkim	Indian National Congress	Kazi Lhendup Dorjee	Sikkim Janata Parishad	Nar Bahadur Bhandari	

== Legislative Assembly elections ==
=== Mizoram ===
Party	Votes	%	Seats	+/–
Mizoram People's Conference	53,515	32.67	18	▼4
Indian National Congress (I)	39,115	23.88	5	New
Janata Party	21,435	13.09	2	New
Independents	49,733	30.36	5	▼3
Total	163,798	100.00	30	0
Valid votes	163,798	99.06		
Invalid/blank votes	1,546	0.94		
Total votes	165,344	100.00		
Registered voters/turnout	241,944	68.34		
Source: ECI

=== Sikkim ===
Party	Votes	%	Seats
Sikkim Janata Parishad	22,776	31.49	16
Sikkim Congress (Revolutionary)	14,889	20.58	11
Sikkim Prajatantra Congress	11,400	15.76	4
Janata Party	9,534	13.18	0
Indian National Congress	1,476	2.04	0
Communist Party of India (Marxist)	241	0.33	0
Sikkim Scheduled Caste League	85	0.12	0
Independents	11,938	16.50	1
Total	72,339	100.00	32
Valid votes	72,339	94.81	
Invalid/blank votes	3,960	5.19	
Total votes	76,299	100.00	
Registered voters/turnout	117,157	65.13	
Source: ECI

== Rajya Sabha elections ==
Source:

== Vice-presidential election ==
The 1979 Indian vice presidential election was not needed as former Chief Justice Mohammad Hidayatullah was elected unopposed for the post.
