= 1968 elections in India =

Elections in India
← 1967	1968	1969 →

Elections in the Republic of India in 1968 included elections to the Haryana Legislative Assembly and to seats in the Rajya Sabha.

== Legislative Assembly elections ==
=== Haryana ===
Elections were held in 1968 in Haryana State for the Haryana Legislative Assembly

Party	Votes	%	Seats
Indian National Congress	1,114,176	43.83	48
Vishal Haryana Party	377,744	14.86	16
Bharatiya Jana Sangh	265,739	10.45	7
Swatantra Party	207,843	8.18	2
Bharatiya Kranti Dal	48,298	1.90	1
Republican Party of India	40,597	1.60	1
Sanyukta Socialist Party	23,936	0.94	0
Akali Dal - Sant Fateh Singh	15,055	0.59	0
Communist Party of India	8,210	0.32	0
Communist Party of India (Marxist)	3,632	0.14	0
Praja Socialist Party	1,801	0.07	0
Independents	434,907	17.11	6
Total	2,541,938	100.00	81
Valid votes	2,541,938	97.52	
Invalid/blank votes	64,729	2.48	
Total votes	2,606,667	100.00	
Registered voters/turnout	4,552,539	57.26	
Source: ECI
