= Municipal corporation (India) =

Local government in India

Municipal corporation नगर निगम
- Local government in urban areas
- Formation: 1688 (first in Madras)
- Founding legislation: 74th Constitutional Amendment Act, 1992 and State Municipal Corporation Acts
- State / Union Territory: Various (India)
- Country: India

Overview
- Level of government: Third tier (local self-government)
- Jurisdiction: Urban areas (generally population above 1 million, varies by state)
- Total municipal corporations: 269 (as of 2025)

Legislative branch
- Legislature: Municipal Council
- Presiding officer: Mayor (Elected by Councillors)
- Deputy Mayor: Elected by councillors
- Councillors: Directly elected from wards
- Meeting place: Municipal Corporation Hall

Executive branch
- Political head: Mayor
- Main body: Municipal administration
- Executive head: Municipal Commissioner / Administrator / Secretary
- Appointed by: Mayor elected by councillors (or directly in some states); Commissioner appointed by state government
- Headquarters: Varies by city
- Main organ: Municipal Corporation
- Departments: Urban planning, public health, sanitation, water supply, education, transport, etc.

A municipal corporation is a type of local government in India which administers an urban area having a population of one million or more. The growing population and urbanization of various Indian cities highlighted the need for a type of local governing body that could provide services such as healthcare, education, housing and transport by collecting property taxes and administering grants from the state government.

The municipal corporation carries out its function through divisions or departments. For example, water supply and sewage disposal Undertaking, Housing Board, Education Department and Electricity Department.

The 74th Amendment Act defined the formations of urban local governments and their activities.

== Other names for municipal corporations ==
Municipal corporations are referred to by different names in different states (due to regional language variations), all of which are translated to "municipal corporation" in English. These names include Nagar Nigam (in Delhi, Himachal Pradesh, Uttar Pradesh, Uttarakhand, Bihar, Jharkhand, Rajasthan, and Haryana), Nagara Nigama (in Punjab), Mahanagar Palika (in Goa, Gujarat and Maharashtra), Mahanagara Palike (in Karnataka), Pouro Nigom (in Assam), Mahānagara Nigama (in Odisha), Pourô Sôngstha (in West Bengal), Pur Porishod (in Tripura), Nagar Palika Nigam (in Chhattisgarh and Madhya Pradesh), Nagara Paalaka Samstha or Mahaanagara Paalaka Samstha (in Andhra Pradesh and Telangana), Nagara Sabha (in Kerala) and Maanagaraatchi (in Tamil Nadu).

The Vadodara Municipal Corporation of the city of Vadodara in Gujarat is typically called by the name "Vadodara Mahanagarpalika". The Mysuru City Corporation of the city of Mysuru in Karnataka is typically called "Mysuru Mahanagara Palike". The Tirunelveli Municipal Corporation of the city of Tirunelveli in Tamil Nadu is typically called by the name "Tirunelveli Maanagaraatchi". The Kochi Corporation of the city of Kochi in Kerala is typically called by the name "Kochi Nagarasabha".

The detailed structure of these urban bodies varies from state to state, as per the laws passed by the state legislatures, but the basic structure and function is almost the same.

== Composition ==
Administrative structure of India

=== Wards Committee (Legislature) ===
The area administered by a municipal corporation is known as a municipal area. Each municipal area is divided into territorial constituencies known as wards. A municipal corporation is made up of a wards committee. Each ward has one seat in the wards committee. Members are elected to the wards committee on the basis of adult franchise for a term of five years. These members are known as councillors or corporators. The number of wards in a municipal area is determined by the population of the city. Some seats are reserved for scheduled castes, scheduled tribes, backward classes and women.

A state can choose to constitute additional committees to carry functions of urban local governance, in addition to the wards committees. In addition to the councillors elected from the wards, the legislature of a state may also choose to make provisions for the representation of persons having special knowledge or experience in municipal administration, the MPs or MLAs representing the constituencies which comprise wholly or partly the municipal area, and/or the commissioners of additional committees that the state may have constituted. If a state legislature appoints a person from the first category to a wards committee, that individual will not have the right to vote in the meetings of the municipal corporation, while MPs, MLAs and commissioners do have the right to vote in meetings.

=== Executive departments ===
There are departments for execution of work related to health, water and sanitation.

== Superlatives ==
The largest corporations are in the ten major metropolitan cities of India, viz. Mumbai, Delhi, Hyderabad, Kolkata, Chennai, Bengaluru, Ahmedabad, Lucknow, Jaipur, Kanpur.

The Brihanmumbai Municipal Corporation (BMC) of the city of Mumbai in Maharashtra is the richest municipal corporation in India. Greater Chennai Corporation of the city of Chennai in Tamil Nadu is the oldest municipal corporation in India and second oldest municipal corporation in the world only behind City of London Corporation in United Kingdom.

== Functionaries ==
Municipal Corporations are urban local bodies established in large cities to provide essential civic services. Their functionaries are classified into elected representatives and appointed officials.

=== Elected Functionaries ===
- Mayor
  - Ceremonial head of the Corporation
  - Presides over Corporation meetings
  - Represents the city in official functions
  - Elected directly or indirectly
- Deputy Mayor
  - Assists the Mayor
  - Acts in the Mayor’s absence
- Municipal Councillors
  - Elected from each municipal ward
  - Constitute the Municipal Corporation (Council)
  - Deliberate on policies, budgets, and development plans
- Standing Committee Members
  - Formed to manage specific functions such as:
    - Finance
    - Health
    - Public Works
    - Education
    - Development
    - Welfare
    - Arts and Sports
  - Headed by Chairpersons elected among councillors.

=== Appointed Functionaries ===
- Municipal Commissioner
  - Chief executive officer of the Corporation.
  - Appointed by the State Government (usually an IAS officer or a State Service officer).
  - Responsible for overall administration and implementation of council decisions.
- Additional/Deputy Commissioners
  - Assist the Municipal Commissioner in specific domains.
- Heads of Departments
  - Manage various departments such as:
    - Engineering
    - Health
    - Sanitation
    - Town Planning
    - Education
    - Accounts
- Revenue Officer
  - Handles property tax and other municipal revenues.
- Medical Officer of Health
  - Supervises public health, sanitation, and hospitals.
- Chief Engineer / Superintending Engineer
  - Oversees infrastructure development and maintenance.
- Other Supporting Staff
  - Includes clerks, inspectors, technical staff, and field workers.

These functionaries operate within the framework of the respective State Municipal Corporation Acts and play a vital role in urban governance and service delivery. These administrative officials are appointed by the respective State Government. The respective state Urban Development/Municipal Affairs/Urban Affairs Department look after their matters.

== Administration ==
Municipal corporations are typically headed by a mayor and deputy mayor (elected from among the councilors), and comprise elected councillors.

The mayor is the head of the municipal corporation, but in most states and territories of India the role is largely ceremonial as executive powers are vested in the municipal commissioner. The office of the mayor combines a functional role of chairing the corporation council meetings as well as ceremonial role associated with being the First Citizen of the city. As per the amended Municipal Corporation Act of 1888, a deputy mayor is appointed by the mayor. The tenure of the mayor, deputy mayor and council is five years. However, in Haryana, Bihar, Chhattisgarh, Jharkhand, Madhya Pradesh, Odisha, Uttar Pradesh and Uttarakhand, mayors are directly elected by the people and thus hold the executive powers of the municipal corporations.

The administrative machinery is further supported by a municipal commissioner or secretary. They functions as the chief executive officer of the municipal corporation. These officials are tasked with the day-to-day operations, implementing policies, and ensuring the efficient delivery of essential services. Executive officers monitor the implementation of all the programs related to planning and development of the corporation with the coordination of mayor and councilors. The municipal corporations consists departments like health, general administration, revenue, engineering, town planning, welfare, education, etc. The officials of these departments, like health inspectors, engineers, and administrative officers, are appointed by the state government.

== Functions of municipal corporations ==
The Twelfth Schedule of the Constitution lists the subjects that municipal corporations are responsible for. Corporations may be entrusted to perform functions and implement schemes including those in relation to the matters listed in the Twelfth Schedule.

- Regulation of land-use and construction of buildings
- Urban planning including town planning
- Planning for economic and social development
- Water supply for domestic, industrial and commercial purposes
- Public health, sanitation conservancy and solid waste management
- Fire services
- Urban forestry, protection of the environment and promotion of ecological aspects
- Safeguarding the interests of weaker sections of society, including the handicapped and mentally disabled
- Slum improvement and upgradation
- Repair street lights
- Urban poverty alleviation
- Provision of urban amenities and facilities such as parks, gardens, playgrounds
- Promotion of cultural, educational and aesthetic aspects
- Burials and burial grounds; cremations, cremation grounds and electric crematoriums
- Cattle pounds; prevention of cruelty to animals
- Vital statistics including registration of births and deaths
- Public amenities including street lighting, parking lots, bus stops and public conveniences
- Regulation of slaughter houses and tanneries

== Municipal corporation headquarters of 10 most populous major metropolitan cities ==
City	Population City Proper (Census 2011)	Area City Proper	Municipal Corporations	Area of Municipal Corporations	Homestate	Headquarters	Other Municipal Bodies within the City limits but are not Municipal Corporations
Mumbai	12,442,373	437.71 km^{2} (169.00 sq mi)	Brihanmumbai Municipal Corporation	437.71 km^{2} (169.00 sq mi)	Maharashtra	BMC Municipal Corporation Building, Mumbai	NA
Delhi	11,034,555	1,483 km^{2} (573 sq mi)	Municipal Corporation of Delhi	1,397.3 km^{2} (539.5 sq mi)	National Capital Territory of Delhi	MCD Dr. Shyama Prasad Mukherjee Civic Centre, Delhi	Delhi Cantonment Board; New Delhi Municipal Council
Bengaluru	8,443,675	712 km^{2} (275 sq mi)	Greater Bengaluru Authority (Apex Body): Bengaluru Central City Municipal Corporation; Bengaluru North City Municipal Corporation; Bengaluru South City Municipal Corporation; Bengaluru East City Municipal Corporation; Bengaluru West City Municipal Corporation	712 km^{2} (275 sq mi): 78 km^{2} (30 sq mi); 158 km^{2} (61 sq mi); 147 km^{2} (57 sq mi); 168 km^{2} (65 sq mi); 161 km^{2} (62 sq mi)	Karnataka	GBA Kempegowda Civic Hall, Bengaluru Note: Permanent HQs for the 5 corporations are yet to be constructed.	NA
Hyderabad	6,993,262	2,093.17 km^{2} (808.18 sq mi)	Core Urban Region Apex Council (Apex Body): Greater Hyderabad Municipal Corporation; Cyberabad Municipal Corporation; Malkajgiri Municipal Corporation	689 km^{2} (266 sq mi); 637 km^{2} (246 sq mi); 727 km^{2} (281 sq mi)	Telangana	GHMC CC Complex, Hyderabad Note: Permanent HQs for CMC and MMC are yet to be constructed.	Secunderabad Cantonment Board
Ahmedabad	5,577,940	449.34 km^{2} (173.49 sq mi)	Ahmedabad Municipal Corporation	449.34 km^{2} (173.49 sq mi)	Gujarat	AMC Sardar Patel Bhavan, Ahmedabad	NA
Chennai	4,646,732	426 km^{2} (164 sq mi)	Greater Chennai Corporation	426 km^{2} (164 sq mi)	Tamil Nadu	GCC Ripon Building, Chennai	NA
Kolkata	4,496,694	206.08 km^{2} (79.57 sq mi)	Kolkata Municipal Corporation	206.08 km^{2} (79.57 sq mi)	West Bengal	KMC Central Municipal Office Buildings, Kolkata	NA
Surat	4,467,797	461.60 km^{2} (178.22 sq mi)	Surat Municipal Corporation	461.60 km^{2} (178.22 sq mi)	Gujarat	SMC Tapi Bhavan, Surat	NA
Pune	3,124,458	516.18 km^{2} (199.30 sq mi)	Pune Municipal Corporation	516.18 km^{2} (199.30 sq mi)	Maharashtra	PMC Mahanagarpalika Bhavan, Pune	NA
Jaipur	3,046,163	467 km^{2} (180 sq mi)	Jaipur Municipal Corporation	467 km^{2} (180 sq mi)	Rajasthan	JMC Pandit Deendayal Upadhyay Bhawan, Jaipur	NA

== See also ==
- List of municipal corporations in India
- Municipal governance in India
- Municipal Corporation Elections
