= Local elections in India =

Local Body Elections (India) are elections conducted to elect local body representatives in India as per the provisions of 73rd amendment of Constitution of India in states and union territories of the country. State Election commissions conducts these elections as per the procedures laid down in State laws. With one of the largest democracies, India has 3.1 million elected representatives out of which 1.3 million representatives are women in 2,50,000 government bodies.

== History and Objective ==
Local Body Elections (India) are conducted periodically in states and union territories of India as per the provision made in Constitution. The reasons for forming these local bodies are 1. Decentralisation of process of democracy and 2. Power devolution at local levels. Local Body Elections are conducted by State Election Commission.

== Levels ==
Local Body Elections (India) are performed at following levels as per the local population:

- Elections to Municipal Corporations - With population of more than 5,00,000.
- Municipality Elections - With population of 1,00,000 to 5,00,000.
- Elections to Nagar Panchayat - Village Council or gram panchayat.
- Zila Parishad Elections - Block council clusters.
- Village Panchayat Elections - Village gram panchayat.
- Panchayat Samiti Elections - Block level.

== Challenges ==
Following are the challenges faced by Panchayat Raj Institutions or other local governance systems;

- Local leaders don't get support from Government.
- No cooperation from institutional organisations like district planning boards created for improvement of planning in local areas due to they being non functional or not prioritising Panchayat Raj Institutions or other local governance systems.
- Restricted efforts on education of elected representatives of Panchayat Raj Institutions or other local governance systems on their constitutional rights with main focus being trainings on government schemes and programmes.
- As the Central and State Governments had created separate organisation structures relating to education, health, and other public services for their implementation, the powers and roles of elected representatives of Panchayat Raj Institutions or other local governance systems have been diluted.

== See also ==
- State Election Commissions in India
- Elections in India.
