= 1960 elections in India =

Elections in India
← 1957	1960	1961 →

== Legislative Assembly elections ==
Legislative Assembly elections in India were conducted for Kerala Legislative Assembly in 1960.

=== Kerala ===
In 1959, the Central Government dismissed the democratically elected government in 1957 elections through the controversial Article 356 of the Indian Constitution following "The Liberation Struggle". After a short period of the President's rule, fresh elections were called in 1960. In these elections, Congress and Praja Socialist Party formed an alliance to counter Communist Party of India in the elections. Congress and Praja Socialist Party alliance got the majority in the election and hence formed the government.

Summary of results of the 1960 Kerala Legislative Assembly election
Political Party	Flag	Seats Contested	Won	Net Change in seats	% of Seats	Votes	Vote %	Change in vote %	Vote % in contested seats
Bharatiya Jana Sangh		3	0	New	0	5,277	0.07	New	3.28
Communist Party of India		108	29	▼31	23.02	3,171,732	39.14	▲3.86	43.79
Indian National Congress	INC Flag Official	80	63	▲20	50.00	2,789,556	34.42	▼3.43	45.37
Praja Socialist Party		33	20	▲11	15.87	1,146,028	14.14	▼3.38	38.41
IUML		12	11	New	8.73	401,925	4.96	New	47.79
Independent		61	3	▼11	4.17	488,699	5.93	-5.61	13.96
		Total Seats	126 ( 0)	Voters	9,604,331	Turnout	8,232,572 (85.72%)		

== See also ==
- 1957 elections in India
