= Municipal elections in India =

Type of Indian local government election

Municipal Corporation elections are conducted to elect municipal councillors and ward representatives for municipal corporations in India. With the enactment of the 74th Constitution Amendment Act in the Constitution of India, the city municipal corporations were identified as 'institutions of self-government'. With India being a democratic country, elections are the only medium for people to elect governments of their choice.

Municipal elections are conducted by respective State Election Commissions (SECs).

== History and administration ==
Municipal corporation elections constitute one tier of India's three-tier governance system. These elections are open to both men and women candidates. On average, voter turnout in municipal elections is estimated to be around 52%.

== Constitutional compulsions ==
The electoral system within urban local bodies (ULB) was fortified through the 74th Constitutional Amendment. This Amendment Act officially designated municipal corporations as 'institutions of self-government'.

== Planning body ==
Municipal corporation elections are conducted under the supervision of the State Election Commission. The State Election Commission is an independent body and consists of individual members who have served as bureaucrats at the state and national level with high reputation, integrity and values.

== Qualifications for contesting ==
Qualification for contesting municipal corporation elections in India:

- Citizen of India.
- Has attained the age of 21 years.
- Registered in ward electoral roll.
- Not disqualified under any law for contesting municipal elections.
- Not employed by any municipal corporation in India.

== Important rulings ==
- Municipal corporation elections in Tamil Nadu should not be delayed was the Supreme Court ruling to Tamil Nadu State Election Commission.
- Municipal corporation elections in Maharashtra are directed to be conducted under a single-member electoral panel as per the direction of State Election Commission.

== See also ==
- Municipal Corporations in India
