= 1961 elections in India =

Elections in India
← 1960	1961	1962 →

== Legislative Assembly elections ==
=== Orissa ===
Summary of results of the 1961 Odisha Legislative Assembly election
Political Party	Flag	Seats Contested	Won	Net Change in seats	% of Seats	Votes	Vote %	Change in vote %
Indian National Congress		140	82	▲26	58.57	12,69,000	43.28	▲5.02
All India Ganatantra Parishad		121	37	▼14	26.42	6,55,099	27.23	▼1.51
Praja Socialist Party		43	10	▼1	7.14	3,22,305	30.43	▲20.03
Communist Party of India		35	4	▼5	3.57	2,33,971	27.32	▲18.92
Jharkhand Party		9	0	"New"	0	25,602	13.57	"New"
Independent		187	7	▼6	5	4,26,302	20.89	N/A
		Total Seats	140 ( 0)	Voters	85,51,743	Turnout	31,27,245 (36.57%)	
