= 1970 elections in India =

Elections in India
← 1969	1970	1971 →

Elections in the Republic of India in 1970 included the 1970 Kerala Legislative Assembly election and elections to seats in the Rajya Sabha.

== Legislative Assembly elections ==
=== Kerala ===
Elections were held in 1970 in Kerala State for the Kerala Legislative Assembly

Party results
Party	Seats
Communist Party of India (CPI)	16
Communist Party of India (Marxist) (CPM)	29
Indian National Congress (INC)	30
Independent (IND)	16
Indian Socialist Party	3
Kerala Congress (KEC)	12
Kerala Socialist Party (KSP)	1
Indian Union Muslim League (IUML)	11
Praja Socialist Party (PSP)	3
Revolutionary Socialist Party (RSP)	6
SOP	6
Total	133
