= 1988 elections in India =

Elections in India
- 1988

Elections in the Republic of India in 1988 included elections to 2 state legislative assemblies and to seats in the Rajya Sabha.

== Overall result ==
Polling Date(s)	State	Government before	Chief Minister before	Government after	Elected Chief Minister	Maps
2 February 1988	Meghalaya	Indian National Congress	Williamson A. Sangma	Indian National Congress	P. A. Sangma	
2 February 1988	Tripura	Communist Party of India (Marxist)	Nripen Chakraborty	Indian National Congress	Sudhir Ranjan Majumdar	

== Legislative Assembly elections ==
=== Meghalaya ===
Elections were held on 2 February for the Legislative Assembly.

← Summary of the 2 February 1988 Meghalaya Legislative Assembly election results →
Parties and coalitions	Popular vote			Seats	
Parties and coalitions	Votes	%	±pp	Won	+/−
Indian National Congress (INC)	198,028	32.65	4.97 ▲	22	3 ▼
Hill People's Union (HPU)	162,806	26.84		19	
Hill State People's Democratic Party (HDP)	78,884	12.68	6.64 ▼	6	9 ▼
All Party Hill Leaders Conference (Armison Marak Group)	28,391	4.68		2	
Public Demands Implementation Convention (PDIC)	19,402	3.2	1.62 ▼	2	Steady
Communist Party of India (CPI)	2,206	0.36	0.16 ▼	0	Steady
Independents (IND)	118,816	19.59	2.9 ▼	9	6 ▲
Total	606,533	100.00		60	±0
Source: Election Commission of India

=== Tripura ===
Performance of the political parties
Party	Seats contested	Seats won	No. of votes	% of votes	1983 Seats
Bharatiya Janata Party	10	0	1,757	0.15%	0
Communist Party of India	1	0	9,314	0.82%	0
Communist Party of India (Marxist)	55	26	520,697	45.82%	37
Indian National Congress	46	25	424,241	37.33%	12
Janata Party	10	0	1,138	0.10%	0
All India Forward Block	1	0	7,631	0.67%	0
Revolutionary Socialist Party	2	2	18,182	1.60%	2
Tripura Upajati Juba Samiti	14	7	119,599	10.52%	6
Independents	81	0	33,846	2.98%	3
Total	220	60	1,136,405		
