= 1965 elections in India =

Elections in India
- 1965

== Legislative Assembly elections ==
=== Kerala ===
Summary of results of the 1965 Kerala Legislative Assembly election
Political Party	Seats Contested	Won	Net Change in seats	% of Seats	Votes	Vote %	Change in vote %
Indian National Congress	133	36	▼27	27.07	21,23,660	33.55	▼0.87
Communist Party of India	79	3	▼28	2.26	525,456	8.3	▼30.84
Communist Party of India (Marxist)	73	40	New	30.08	1,257,869	19.87	New
Kerala Congress	54	23	New	17.29	796,291	12.58	New
IUML	16	6	▼5	4.51	242,529	3.71	▼1.29
Samyukta Socialist Party	29	13	New	9.77	514,689	8.13	New
Independent	174	12	▲7	9.02	869,843	13.74	N/A
	Total Seats	133 ( 0)		Voters	6,330,337		
