= 1967 elections in India =

Elections in India
- 1967

The elections in India in 1967 included the 1967 Indian general election and nine state legislative assembly elections.

== General election ==
Party	Votes	%	Seats	+/–
Indian National Congress	59,490,701	40.78	283	–78
Bharatiya Jana Sangh	13,580,935	9.31	35	+21
Swatantra Party	12,646,847	8.67	44	+26
Communist Party of India	7,458,396	5.11	23	–6
Samyukta Socialist Party	7,171,627	4.92	23	New
Communist Party of India (Marxist)	6,246,522	4.28	19	New
Dravida Munnetra Kazhagam	5,529,405	3.79	25	+18
Praja Socialist Party	4,456,487	3.06	13	+1
Republican Party of India	3,607,711	2.47	1	–2
Bangla Congress	1,204,356	0.83	5	New
Peasants and Workers Party of India	1,028,755	0.71	2	+2
Akali Dal – Sant Fateh Singh	968,712	0.66	3	New
All India Forward Bloc	627,910	0.43	2	0
Indian Union Muslim League	413,868	0.28	2	0
Kerala Congress	321,219	0.22	0	New
Jammu & Kashmir National Conference	210,020	0.14	1	New
Akali Dal – Master Tara Singh	189,290	0.13	0	New
Jana Kranti Dal	183,211	0.13	1	New
Jana Congress	136,631	0.09	0	New
All Party Hill Leaders Conference	112,492	0.08	1	0
United Goans – Seqveria Group	100,137	0.07	1	New
Peoples Front	42,725	0.03	0	New
Democratic National Conference	30,788	0.02	0	New
United Goans – Furtadd Group	1,714	0.00	0	New
Nagaland Nationalist Organisation	0	0.00	1	New
Independents	20,106,051	13.78	35	+15
Appointed members (Note: Two representing Anglo-Indians and one representing the North-East Frontier Agency.)			3	–11
Total	145,866,510	100.00	523	+15
Valid votes	145,866,510	95.51		
Invalid/blank votes	6,858,101	4.49		
Total votes	152,724,611	100.00		
Registered voters/turnout	250,207,401	61.04		
Source: ECI

== Legislative Assembly elections ==
=== Andhra Pradesh ===
Party	Votes	%	Seats
Bharatiya Jana Sangh	291,783	2.11	3
Communist Party of India	1,077,499	7.78	11
Communist Party of India (Marxist)	1,053,855	7.61	9
Indian National Congress	6,292,649	45.42	165
Praja Socialist Party	28,564	0.21	0
Republican Party of India	36,757	0.27	1
Samyukta Socialist Party	49,669	0.36	1
Swatantra Party	1,363,382	9.84	29
Independents	3,658,928	26.41	68
Total	13,853,086	100.00	287
Valid votes	13,853,086	85.59	
Invalid/blank votes	2,333,093	14.41	
Total votes	16,186,179	100.00	
Registered voters/turnout	20,934,068	77.32	
Source: ECI

=== Assam ===
Summary of results of the 1967 Assam Legislative Assembly election
Political Party	Flag	Seats Contested	Won	% of Seats	Votes	Vote %
Indian National Congress		120	73	44.66%	1354748	43.60%
All Party Hill Leaders Conference		12	9	57.86%	108447	3.49%
Communist Party of India		22	7	30.19%	108447	5.15%
Praja Socialist Party		35	5	23.20%	213094	6.86%
Samyukta Socialist Party		17	4	26.37%	101802	3.28%
Swatantra Party		13	2	14.07%	46187	1.49%
Independent		124	26	36.12%	1004695	32.33%
Total Seats		105	Voters	5449305	Turnout	3369230 (61.83%)

=== Bihar ===
Party	Votes	%	Seats	+/–
Indian National Congress	4,479,460	33.09	128	–57
Samyukta Socialist Party	2,385,961	17.62	68	New
Bharatiya Jana Sangh	1,410,722	10.42	26	+23
Praja Socialist Party	942,889	6.96	18	–11
Communist Party of India	935,977	6.91	24	+12
Jan Kranti Dal	451,412	3.33	13	New
Swatantra Party	315,184	2.33	3	–47
Communist Party of India (Marxist)	173,656	1.28	4	New
Republican Party of India	23,893	0.18	1	New
Independents	2,419,469	17.87	33	–21
Total	13,538,623	100.00	318	0
Valid votes	13,538,623	73.37		
Invalid/blank votes	4,914,436	26.63		
Total votes	18,453,059	100.00		
Registered voters/turnout	27,743,190	66.51		
Source: ECI

=== Delhi ===
Party	Seats		
Party	Elected	Nominated	Total
Bharatiya Jana Sangh	33	2	35
Indian National Congress	19	2	21
Republican Party of India	2	0	2
Independents	2	1	3
Total	56	5	61
Source: Parveen, Delhi Gazetteer

=== Goa, Daman and Diu ===
Summary of results of the Goa, Daman & Diu Legislative Assembly election, 1967
Political Party	Seats contested	Seats won	Number of Votes	% of Votes
Maharashtrawadi Gomantak Party	26	16	111,110	40.42%
United Goans Party (Sequeira Group)	30	12	104,426	37.98%
Independents	156	2	48,471	17.63%
Total	226	30	264.007	100%

=== Gujarat ===
Party	Votes	%	Seats	+/–
Indian National Congress	2,933,059	45.96	93	▼20
Swatantra Party	2,436,901	38.19	66	▲40
Praja Socialist Party	212,314	3.33	3	▼4
Bharatiya Jana Sangh	120,147	1.88	1	New
Others	28,574	0.45	0	0
Independents	650,097	10.19	5	▼12
Total	6,381,092	100.00	168	▲14
Valid votes	6,381,092	79.77		
Invalid/blank votes	1,618,322	20.23		
Total votes	7,999,414	100.00		
Registered voters/turnout	10,694,972	74.80		
Source: ECI

=== Haryana ===
Party	Votes	%	Seats
Indian National Congress	1,252,290	41.33	48
Bharatiya Jana Sangh	436,145	14.39	12
Samyukta Socialist Party	108,172	3.57	0
Swatantra Party	96,410	3.18	3
Republican Party of India	87,861	2.90	2
Communist Party of India	27,238	0.90	0
Communist Party of India (Marxist)	16,379	0.54	0
Praja Socialist Party	6,477	0.21	0
Independents	998,969	32.97	16
Total	3,029,941	100.00	81
Valid votes	3,029,941	76.48	
Invalid/blank votes	931,825	23.52	
Total votes	3,187,946	–	
Registered voters/turnout	4,387,980	72.65	
Source: ECI

=== Himachal Pradesh ===
Party	Votes	%	Seats
Indian National Congress	323,247	42.19	34
Bharatiya Jana Sangh	106,261	13.87	7
Communist Party of India	22,173	2.89	2
Swatantra Party	14,767	1.93	1
Others	7,787	1.02	0
Independents	291,884	38.10	16
Total	766,119	100.00	60
Valid votes	766,119	94.54	
Invalid/blank votes	44,234	5.46	
Total votes	810,353	100.00	
Registered voters/turnout	1,582,103	51.22	
Source: ECI

=== Jammu and Kashmir ===
Party	Votes	%	Seats	+/–
Indian National Congress	423,922	53.02	61	New
Jammu & Kashmir National Conference	137,179	17.16	8	▼62
Bharatiya Jana Sangh	131,542	16.45	3	New
Others	38,552	4.82	0	0
Independents	68,377	8.55	3	▲1
Total	799,572	100.00	75	0
Valid votes	799,572	86.51		
Invalid/blank votes	124,727	13.49		
Total votes	924,299	100.00		
Registered voters/turnout	1,419,253	65.13		
Source: ECI

=== Kerala ===
Summary of results of the 1967 Kerala Legislative Assembly election
Political Party	Flag	Seats Contested	Won	Net Change in seats	% of Seats	Votes	Vote %	Change in vote %
Bharatiya Jana Sangh		22	0	NA	0	55,584	0.88	NA
Communist Party of India		22	19	▲16	14.29	538,004	8.57	▲0.27
Communist Party of India (Marxist)		59	52	▲12	39.10	1,476,456	23.51	▲3.64
Indian National Congress		133	9	▼27	6.77	2,789,556	35.43	▲1.88
Praja Socialist Party		7	0	NA	0	13,991	0.22	NA
Samyukta Socialist Party		21	19	6	14.29	527,662	8.4	▲0.27
Swatantra Party		6	0	NA	14.29	13,105	0.21	NA
Kerala Congress		61	5	▼1	3.76	475,172	7.57	▼5.01
IUML		15	14	▲8	10.53	424,159	6.75	▲2.92
Independent		75	15	▲3	11.28	531,783	8.47	▼5.27
		Total Seats	133 ( 0)	Voters	8,613,658	Turnout	6,518,272 (75.67%)	

=== Madras ===
Alliances	Party	Popular Vote	Vote %	Seats contested	Seats won	Change
United Front Seats: 179; Seat Change: ▲121; Popular Vote: 8,051,433; Popular Vote %: 52.59%	Dravida Munnetra Kazhagam	6,230,552	40.69%	174	137	▲87
United Front Seats: 179; Seat Change: ▲121; Popular Vote: 8,051,433; Popular Vote %: 52.59%	Swatantra Party	811,232	5.30%	27	20	▲12
United Front Seats: 179; Seat Change: ▲121; Popular Vote: 8,051,433; Popular Vote %: 52.59%	CPI(M)	623,114	4.07%	22	11	▲11
United Front Seats: 179; Seat Change: ▲121; Popular Vote: 8,051,433; Popular Vote %: 52.59%	Praja Socialist Party	136,188	0.89%	4	4	▲4
United Front Seats: 179; Seat Change: ▲121; Popular Vote: 8,051,433; Popular Vote %: 52.59%	Indian Union Muslim League	95,494	0.62%	3	3	▲3
United Front Seats: 179; Seat Change: ▲121; Popular Vote: 8,051,433; Popular Vote %: 52.59%	Samyukta Socialist Party	84,188	0.55%	3	2	▲2
United Front Seats: 179; Seat Change: ▲121; Popular Vote: 8,051,433; Popular Vote %: 52.59%	DMK Backed Independents	70,665	0.46%	2	2	▲2
Indian National Congress; Seats: 51; Seat Change: ▼84; Popular Vote: 6,293,378; Popular Vote %: 41.10%	Indian National Congress	6,293,378	41.10%	232	51	▼84
Others; Seats: 4 Seat Change: ▼4	Independent	591,214	3.86%	246	1	▼4
Others; Seats: 4 Seat Change: ▼4	Communist Party of India	275,932	1.80%	32	2	Steady
Others; Seats: 4 Seat Change: ▼4	Forward Bloc	44,714	0.29%	1	1	Steady
Others; Seats: 4 Seat Change: ▼4	Republican Party of India	31,286	0.20%	13	0	Steady
Others; Seats: 4 Seat Change: ▼4	Bharatiya Jana Sangh	22,745	0.15%	24	0	Steady
Total	11 Political Parties	15,310,702	100%	—	234	▲28

=== Maharashtra ===
Summary of results of the Maharashtra State Assembly election, 1967
Political Party	No. of candidates	No. of elected	Number of Votes	% of Votes	Seat change
Indian National Congress	270	203	6,288,564	47.03%	▼12
Peasants and Workers Party of India	58	19	1,043,239	7.80%	▲4
Communist Party of India	41	10	651,077	4.87%	▲4
Praja Socialist Party	66	8	545,935	4.08%	▼1
Republican Party of India	79	5	890,377	6.66%	▲5
Bharatiya Jana Sangh	166	4	1,092,670	8.17%	▲4
Samyukta Socialist Party	48	4	616,466	4.61%	▲4
Communist Party of India (Marxist)	11	1	145,083	1.08%	▲1
Independents	463	16	1,948,223	14.57%	▲1
Total	1242	270	13,371,735		

=== Manipur ===
Party	Votes	%	Seats	+/–
Indian National Congress	101,504	32.53	16	New
Sanghata Socialist Party	36,520	11.70	4	New
Communist Party of India	17,062	5.47	1	New
Praja Socialist Party	2,417	0.77	0	New
Communist Party of India (Marxist)	2,093	0.67	0	New
Independents	152,419	48.85	9	New
Total	312,015	100.00	30	0
Valid votes	312,015	82.00		
Invalid/blank votes	68,505	18.00		
Total votes	380,520	100.00		
Registered voters/turnout	468,707	81.19		
Source: ECI

=== Mysore ===
Summary of results of the Mysore Legislative Assembly election, 1967
Political Party	Contestants	Seats won	Seat change	Number of votes	Vote share	Net change
Indian National Congress	216	126	▼12	3,636,374	48.43%	▼1.79
Praja Socialist Party	52	20	0	666,662	8.88%	▼5.20
Swatantra Party	45	16	▲7	497,055	6.62%	▼0.53
Samyukta Socialist Party	17	6		185,222	2.47%	
Bharatiya Jana Sangh	37	4		211,966	2.82%	
Independents		41	▲14	2,129,786	28.36%	N/A
Total		216				

=== Odisha ===
Summary of results of the 1967 Odisha Legislative Assembly election
Political Party	Flag	Seats Contested	Won	Net Change in seats	% of Seats	Votes	Vote %	Change in vote %
Indian National Congress		140	31	▼51	22.14	12,35,149	30.66	▼12.62
Bharatiya Jana Sangh		19	0	"New"	0	21,788	4.07	"New"
Praja Socialist Party		33	21	▲11	7.85	4,93,750	41.16	▲10.73
Communist Party of India		31	7	▲3	5	2,11,999	20.71	▼6.61
Communist Party of India (Marxist)		10	1	"New"	0.71	46,597	18.16	"New"
Swatantra Party		101	49	"New"	35	9,09,421	34.78	"New"
JAC		47	26	"New"	18.57	5,42,734	37.17	"New"
Independent		21	2	N/A	1.42	5,05,394	17.72	N/A
		Total Seats	140 ( 0)	Voters	98,73,057	Turnout	43,48,838 (44.05%)	

=== Punjab ===
Result of Punjab Legislative Assembly election 1967
Part	contested	Seats won	change in seats	popular vote	%
Akali Dal - Sant Fateh Singh	59	24	▲24	8,71,742	20.48
Bharatiya Jana Sangh	49	9	▲1	4,18,921	9.84%
Communist Party of India	19	5	▼4	2,21,494	5.20%
Communist Party of India (Marxist)	13	3	▲3	1,38,857	3.26%
Republican Party of India	17	3	▲3	76,089	1.79%
Akali Dal Master Tara Singh Group	61	2	▲2	1,78,746	4.20%
Socialist Party	8	1	▼3	30,591	0.72%
Independents	235	9	▼9	6,83,369	16.05%
Indian National Congress	102	48	▼42	15,94,160	37.45%
Others	19	0		43,144	1.02%
Total	602	104		42,57,113	

Parties in green box formed coalition government

=== Rajasthan ===
Party	Votes	%	Seats	+/–
Indian National Congress	2,798,411	41.42	89	+1
Swatantra Party	1,493,018	22.10	48	+12
Bharatiya Jana Sangh	789,609	11.69	22	+7
Sanghata Socialist Party	321,574	4.76	8	New
Communist Party of India	79,826	1.18	0	0
Communist Party of India	65,531	0.97	1	–4
Praja Socialist Party	54,618	0.81	0	–2
Jai Telangana Party	45,576	0.67	0	New
Republican Party of India	8,932	0.13	0	New
Independents	1,099,169	16.27	16	–6
Total	6,756,264	100.00	184	+8
Valid votes	6,756,264	79.34		
Invalid/blank votes	1,759,342	20.66		
Total votes	8,515,606	100.00		
Registered voters/turnout	10,002,447	85.14		
Source: ECI

=== Tripura ===
Performance of the political parties in this election
Party	Seats contested	Seats won	No. of votes	% of votes	1963 Seats
Bharatiya Jana Sangh	5	0	1,506	0.35%	No data available
Communist Party of India	7	1	34,562	7.97%	No data available
Communist Party of India (Marxist)	16	2	93,739	21.61%	No data available
Indian National Congress	30	27	251,345	57.95%	No data available
Sanghata Socialist Party	1	0	83	0.02%	No data available
Independents	28	0	52,457	12.10%	No data available
Total	87	30	433,692		

=== Uttar Pradesh ===
Party	Votes	%	+/–	Seats	+/–
Indian National Congress	6,912,104	32.20	▼4.13%	199	▼50
Bharatiya Jana Sangh	4,651,738	21.67	▲5.21%	98	▲49
Samyukta Socialist Party	2,140,924	9.97	▲7.41%	44	▲20
Communist Party of India	692,942	3.23	▼1.85%	13	▼1
Swatantra Party	1,016,284	4.73	▲0.13%	12	▼3
Praja Socialist Party	878,738	4.09	▼7.43%	11	▼27
Republican Party of India	889,010	4.14	▲0.40%	10	▲2
Communist Party of India (Marxist)	272,565	1.27	new party	1	new party
Independents	4,013,661	18.70	▲5.99%	37	▲6
Total	21,467,966	100.00	–	425	▼5
Valid votes	21,467,966	93.38			
Invalid/blank votes	1,521,785	6.62			
Total votes	22,989,751	100.00			
Registered voters/turnout	42,148,100	54.55			

=== West Bengal ===
Summary of results of the West Bengal Legislative Assembly election, 1967
Political Party	No. of candidates	No. of elected	Number of Votes	% of Votes	Seat change
Indian National Congress	280	127	5,207,930	41.13%	▼30
Communist Party of India (Marxist)	135	43	2,293,026	18.11%	▲43
Bangla Congress	80	34	1,286,028	10.16%	▲34
Communist Party of India	62	16	827,196	6.53%	▼34
All India Forward Bloc	42	13	561,148	4.43%	Steady
Samyukta Socialist Party	26	7	269,234	2.13%	▲7
Praja Socialist Party	26	7	238,694	1.88%	▲2
Revolutionary Socialist Party	16	6	238,694	2.14%	▲2
Socialist Unity Centre of India	8	4	238,694	0.72%	▲1
Marxist Forward Bloc	58	1	167,934	1.33%	▲1
Revolutionary Communist Party of India	58	1	167,934	1.33%	▼8
Bharatiya Jana Sangh	58	1	167,934	1.33%	▲1
Swatantra Party	21	1	102,576	0.81%	▲1
Independents	327	31	1,708,011	13.49%	▲20
Total	1058	280	12,663,030		
