= 1963 elections in India =

Elections in India
- 1963

Elections were held for the Goa, Daman and Diu Legislative Assembly in 1963. The Maharashtrawadi Gomantak Party secured the most seats – 14 of the 30 available.

== Legislative Assembly Election ==
=== Goa, Daman and Diu ===
First Goa, Daman and Diu Legislative Assembly election was held in 1963 after annexing it in India.

| Party | Votes | % | Seats |
|---|---|---|---|
| Maharashtrawadi Gomantak Party | 100,117 | 40.13 | 14 |
| United Goans Party | 74,081 | 29.69 | 12 |
| Indian National Congress | 43,100 | 17.27 | 1 |
| Frente Popular | 4,548 | 1.82 | 0 |
| Independents (Note: Independents included two candidates of the Praja Socialist Party) | 27,648 | 11.08 | 3 |
| Total | 249,494 | 100.00 | 30 |
| Valid votes | 249,494 | 95.82 | |
| Invalid/blank votes | 10,878 | 4.18 | |
| Total votes | 260,372 | 100.00 | |
