= 1992 elections in India =

Elections in India
← 1991	1992	1993 →

Elections in the Republic of India in 1992 included elections to the Punjab Legislative Assembly, seats in the Rajya Sabha and the elections to the posts of President and vice president.

== Punjab Legislative Assembly election ==
Summary of results of the Punjab Legislative Assembly election, 1992
Political Party	No. of Candidates	Seats won	Number of Votes	% of Votes
Indian National Congress	116	87	13,17,075	43.83%
Shiromani Akali Dal	58	3	1,56,171	5.20%
Bharatiya Janata Party	66	6	4,95,161	16.48%
Communist Party of India	20	4	1,09,386	3.64%
Bahujan Samaj Party	105	9	4,90,552	17.59%
Communist Party of India (M)	17	1	72,061	2.40%
Indian People's Front	2	1	2,292	0.08%
Janata Dal	37	1	64,666	2.15%
Independents	151	4	2,77,706	9.24%
Total	579	117	30,05,083	

== President ==
Source: Web archive of Election Commission of India website

Candidate	Electoral Values
Shankar Dayal Sharma	675,864
George Gilbert Swell	346,485
Ram Jethmalani	2,704
Joginder Singh	1,135
Total	1,026,188

== Vice-president ==
Result of the Indian vice-presidential election, 1992
Candidate	Party	Electoral Votes	% of Votes
K. R. Narayanan	INC	700	99.86
Joginder Singh	Independent	1	0.14
Total		701	100.00
Valid Votes		701	98.59
Invalid Votes		10	1.41
Turnout		711	90.00
Abstentions		79	10.00
Electors		790	
