= 1994 elections in India =

Elections in India
- 1994

Elections in the Republic of India in 1994 included elections to four state legislative assemblies and to seats in the Rajya Sabha.

== Overall result ==
Date(s)	State	Government before	Chief Minister before	Government after	Elected Chief Minister	Maps
16 November 1994	Goa	Indian National Congress	Wilfred de Souza	Indian National Congress	Pratapsingh Rane	
16 November 1994	Sikkim	Sikkim Sangram Parishad	Nar Bahadur Bhandari	Sikkim Democratic Front	Pawan Kumar Chamling	
1 December 1994	Andhra Pradesh	Indian National Congress	Kotla Vijaya Bhaskara Reddy	Telugu Desam Party	N. T. Rama Rao	
13 December 1994	Karnataka	Indian National Congress	Veerappa Moily	Janata Dal	H. D. Deve Gowda	

== Legislative Assembly elections ==
=== Andhra Pradesh ===
No	Party	Seats Contested	Seats Won	Seats change	Vote Share	Swing
1	Telugu Desam Party	251	216	+142	44.14%	+7.60%
2	Indian National Congress	294	26	-155	33.85%	-13.24%
3	Communist Party of India	21	19	+11	3.39%	+0.75%
4	Communist Party of India (Marxist)	16	15	+9	2.96%	+0.50%
5	Bharatiya Janata Party	280	3	-2	3.89%	+2.11%
6	Majlis Bachao Tehreek	9	2	+2	0.49%	0.49%
7	All India Majlis-e-Ittehadul Muslimeen	20	1	-3	0.70%	-1.29%

=== Goa ===
Party	Votes	%	Seats
Indian National Congress	216,165	37.54	18
Maharashtrawadi Gomantak Party	128,033	22.24	12
Bhartiya Janata Party	52,094	9.05	4
United Goans Democratic Party	47,765	8.30	3
Bahujan Samaj Party	9,109	1.58	0
Shiv Sena	8,347	1.45	0
Communist Party of India	3,424	0.59	0
Communist Party of India (Marxist)	2,431	0.42	0
Gomantak Lok Pox	1,497	0.26	0
Janata Party	1,434	0.25	0
Samajwadi Party	205	0.04	0
Republican Party of India	177	0.03	0
Independents	105,108	18.25	3
Total	575,789	100.00	40
Valid votes	575,789	98.31	
Invalid/blank votes	9,889	1.69	
Total votes	585,678	100.00	
Registered voters/turnout	822,631	71.20	
Source: ECI

=== Karnataka ===
Summary of the 1994 Karnataka legislature election results
Parties	Flag	Seats contested	Seats won	% of votes	Seat change	Vote share % change
Janata Dal		221	115	33.54%	▲77	▲6.46%
Bharatiya Janata Party (BJP)		223	40	16.99%	▲36	▲12.85%
Indian National Congress		221	34	26.95%	▼143	▼16.55%
Karnataka Congress Party		218	10	7.31%	New Party	New Party
Karnataka Rajya Raitha Sangha		108	1	2.65%	▼1	▼0.94%
Bahujan Samaj Party		77	1	0.78%	▼1	▲0.74
Communist Party of India (Marxist)		13	1	0.49%	▲1	▼0.04
Indian National League		2	1	0.29%	New Party	New Party
All India Anna Dravida Munnetra Kazhagam		4	1	0.24%	-	▼0.06%
Kannada Chalavali Vatal Paksha		42	1	0.18%	New Party	New Party
Bharatiya Republican Paksha		2	1	0.13%	▼1	▼0.09%
Others			0	1.05%	▼3	▼2.37%
Independent		1256	17	9.4%	▲5	▲1.28%
Total (Turnout %)			224	100.00		

=== Sikkim ===
Party	Votes	%	Seats	+/–
Sikkim Democratic Front	72,856	42.00	19	New
Sikkim Sangram Parishad	60,851	35.08	10	–22
Indian National Congress	26,045	15.02	2	+2
Revolutionary Socialist Party	2,906	1.68	0	New
Bharatiya Janata Party	274	0.16	0	New
Communist Party of India (Marxist)	270	0.16	0	New
Independents	10,255	5.91	1	+1
Total	173,457	100.00	32	0
Valid votes	173,457	97.44		
Invalid/blank votes	4,566	2.56		
Total votes	178,023	100.00		
Registered voters/turnout	217,743	81.76		
Source: ECI

== Legislative By-elections ==
=== Himachal Pradesh ===
1994 Himachal Pradesh Legislative Assembly by-election : Hamirpur
Party	Candidate	Votes	%	±%
INC	Anita Verma	17,955		
BJP	Narinder Thakur	17,262		
Margin of victory		693		
INC gain from BJP		Swing		
