= 1980 elections in India =

Elections in India
- 1980

== General Elections ==
Party	Votes	%	Seats	+/–
Indian National Congress (Indira)	84,455,313	42.69	353	+199
Janata Party	37,530,228	18.97	31	–264
Janata Party (Secular)	18,574,696	9.39	41	New
Communist Party of India (Marxist)	12,352,331	6.24	37	+15
Indian National Congress (Urs)	10,449,859	5.28	13	New
Communist Party of India	4,927,342	2.49	10	+3
All India Anna Dravida Munnetra Kazhagam	4,674,064	2.36	2	–16
Dravida Munnetra Kazhagam	4,236,537	2.14	16	+14
Shiromani Akali Dal	1,396,412	0.71	1	–8
Revolutionary Socialist Party	1,285,517	0.65	4	0
All India Forward Bloc	1,011,564	0.51	3	0
Jammu & Kashmir National Conference	493,143	0.25	3	+1
Indian Union Muslim League	475,507	0.24	2	0
Peasants and Workers Party of India	470,567	0.24	0	–5
Republican Party of India (Khobragade)	383,022	0.19	0	–2
Kerala Congress	356,997	0.18	1	–1
Republican Party of India	351,987	0.18	0	0
Socialist Unity Centre of India	307,224	0.16	0	0
Jharkhand Party	254,520	0.13	1	+1
All India Muslim League	196,820	0.10	0	0
United Democratic Front	140,210	0.07	0	–1
Shiv Sena	129,351	0.07	0	New
Maharashtrawadi Gomantak Party	127,188	0.06	1	0
Tripura Upajati Juba Samiti	111,953	0.06	0	0
People's Party of Arunachal	69,810	0.04	0	New
Akhil Bharatiya Ram Rajya Parishad	61,161	0.03	0	0
Peoples Conference	53,891	0.03	0	New
Manipur Peoples Party	49,277	0.02	0	0
Indian Socialist Party	39,399	0.02	0	New
Shoshit Samaj Dal (Akhil Bharatiya)	38,226	0.02	0	0
Sikkim Janata Parishad	31,750	0.02	1	New
Muslim Majlis	26,363	0.01	0	New
All India Labour Party	14,720	0.01	0	0
All Party Hill Leaders Conference	13,058	0.01	0	New
Sikkim Congress (Revolutionary)	11,632	0.01	0	New
Sikkim Prajatantra Congress	5,125	0.00	0	New
Independents	12,717,510	6.43	9	0
Appointed Anglo-Indians			2	0
Total	197,824,274	100.00	531	–13
Valid votes	197,824,274	97.57		
Invalid/blank votes	4,928,619	2.43		
Total votes	202,752,893	100.00		
Registered voters/turnout	356,205,329	56.92		
Source: EIC

== Overall result ==
Date(s)	State	Government before	Chief Minister before	Government after	Elected Chief Minister	Maps
28 May 1980	Tamil Nadu		President's Rule	All India Anna Dravida Munnetra Kazhagam	M. G. Ramachandran	
28 May 1980	Goa		President's Rule	Indian National Congress (Urs)	Pratapsingh Rane	
28 May 1980	Manipur		President's Rule	Indian National Congress	Raj Kumar Dorendra Singh	
28 May 1980	Arunachal Pradesh		President's Rule	Indian National Congress	Gegong Apang	
28 May 1980	Bihar		President's Rule	Indian National Congress	Jagannath Mishra	
28 May 1980	Maharashtra		President's Rule	Indian National Congress	A. R. Antulay	
28 May 1980	Madhya Pradesh		President's Rule	Indian National Congress	Arjun Singh	
28 May 1980	Uttar Pradesh		President's Rule	Indian National Congress	Vishwanath Pratap Singh	
28 May 1980	Odisha		President's Rule	Indian National Congress	Janaki Ballabh Patnaik	
28 May 1980	Rajasthan		President's Rule	Indian National Congress	Jagannath Pahadia	
28 May 1980	Gujarat		President's Rule	Indian National Congress	Madhav Singh Solanki	
28 May 1980	Pondicherry		President's Rule	Dravida Munnetra Kazhagam	M. D. R. Ramachandran	
28 May 1980	Kerala		President's Rule	Left Democratic Front	E. K. Nayanar	
28 May 1980	Punjab		President's Rule	Indian National Congress	Darbara Singh	

== Legislative Assembly elections ==
=== Arunachal Pradesh ===
Party	Votes	%	Seats	+/–
Indian National Congress (Indira)	72,734	42.58	13	New
People's Party of Arunachal	70,006	40.98	13	▲5
Indian National Congress (Urs)	8,361	4.89	0	New
Independents	19,716	11.54	4	▼1
Total	170,817	100.00	30	0
Valid votes	170,817	94.87		
Invalid/blank votes	9,235	5.13		
Total votes	180,052	100.00		
Registered voters/turnout	258,112	69.76		
Source: ECI

=== Bihar ===
Party	Votes	%	Seats
Indian National Congress	7,690,225	34.20	169
Janata Party (Secular)	3,515,684	15.63	42
Communist Party of India	2,051,962	9.12	23
Bharatiya Janata Party	1,891,325	8.41	21
Indian National Congress (U)	1,649,695	7.34	14
Janata Party (JP)	1,620,754	7.21	13
Communist Party of India (Marxist)	394,013	1.75	6
Janata Party (Secular) Raj Narain	362,388	1.61	1
Jharkhand Mukti Morcha	380,891	1.69	11
Shoshit Samaj Dal (Akhil Bharatiya)	128,517	0.57	–
Socialist Unity Centre of India (Communist)	49,407	0.22	1
Jharkhand Party	31,952	0.14	–
Revolutionary Socialist Party	11,963	0.05	–
Lokdal	6,744	0.03	–
Janata Party	6,733	0.03	–
All India Forward Bloc	5,309	0.02	–
Bharatiya Socialist Party	1,102	0.00	–
Akhil Bharatiya Ram Rajya Parishad	729	0.00	–
Republican Party of India	568	0.00	–
Independent	2,688,947	11.96	23
Total	22,488,908	100.00	324
Valid votes	22,488,908	98.62	
Invalid/blank votes	315,496	1.38	
Total votes	22,804,404	100.00	
Registered voters/turnout	39,815,510	57.28	

=== Goa, Daman and Diu ===
Party	Votes	%	Seats	+/–
Indian National Congress (Urs)	134,651	38.36	20	New
Maharashtrawadi Gomantak Party	127,714	36.36	7	–8
Janata Party	14,431	4.11	0	–3
Indian National Congress	12,338	3.51	0	–10
Janata Party (Secular)	6,045	1.72	0	New
Communist Party of India (Marxist)	1,089	0.31	0	New
Independents	54,773	15.60	3	+1
Invalid/blank votes	12,232	–	–	–
Total	363,273	100	30	+1
Registered voters/turnout	522,652	69.51	–	–
Source: Election Commission of India

=== Gujarat ===
Party	Votes	%	Seats	+/–
Indian National Congress (I)	3,971,238	51.04	141	New
Janata Party	1,771,853	22.77	21	New
Bharatiya Janata Party	1,090,652	14.02	9	New
Janata Party (Secular)	49,278	0.63	1	New
Others	122,299	1.57	0	0
Independents	775,813	9.97	10	▼6
Total	7,781,133	100.00	182	0
Valid votes	7,781,133	97.48		
Invalid/blank votes	200,862	2.52		
Total votes	7,981,995	100.00		
Registered voters/turnout	16,501,328	48.37		
Source: ECI

=== Kerala ===
Party Wise Results
Party	Seats	Alliance
Communist Party of India (CPI)	17	Left Democratic Front
Communist Party of Indian (Marxist) (CPM)	35	Left Democratic Front
Indian National Congress (U) (INC (U))	21	Left Democratic Front
Kerala Congress (Pillai Group) (KCP)	1	Left Democratic Front
Kerala Congress (M) (KCM)	8	Left Democratic Front
All India Muslim League (AIMUL)	5	Left Democratic Front
Revolutionary Socialist Party (RSP)	6	Left Democratic Front
Indian National Congress (I) (INC (I))	17	United Democratic Front
Indian Union Muslim League (IUML)	14	United Democratic Front
Kerala Congress (J) (KEC)	6	United Democratic Front
Janata Party (JNP)	5	United Democratic Front
National Democratic Party (NDP)	3	United Democratic Front
Praja Socialist Party (PSP)	1	United Democratic Front
Independent (IND)	1	N/A
Total	140	LDF-93, UDF-46, IND-1

=== Madhya Pradesh ===
SN	Party	Seats Contested	Seats won	Seats Changed	% Votes
1	Indian National Congress (I)	320	246		47.52%
2	Bharatiya Janata Party	310	60		30.34%
3	Communist Party of India	46	2		1.50%
4	Janata Party	124	2		2.88%
5	Janata Party (Secular)	204	1		4.82%
6	Republican Party of India (Khobragade)	13	1		0.33%
6	Independent	288	8		10.26%
	Total		320		

=== Maharashtra ===
Summary of results of the Maharashtra State Assembly election, 1980
Political Party	Candidates	Seats won	Seat +/-	Votes	Vote %	Vote % +/-
Indian National Congress (Indira) 186 / 288 (65%)	286	186	▲124	7,809,533	44.50%	▲26.16%
Indian National Congress (Urs) 47 / 288 (16%)	192	47	▼22 (from INC seats)	3,596,582	20.49%	▼4.84% (from INC vote share)
Janata Party 17 / 288 (6%)	111	17	▼82	1,511,042	8.61%	▼19.38%
Bharatiya Janata Party 14 / 288 (5%)	145	14	▲14	1,645,734	9.38%	▲9.38% (New Party)
Peasants and Workers Party of India 9 / 288 (3%)	41	9	▼4	726,338	4.14%	▼1.40%
Communist Party of India 2 / 288 (0.7%)	17	2	▲1	230,570	1.31%	▼0.17%
Communist Party of India (Marxist) 2 / 288 (0.7%)	10	2	▼7	162,651	0.93%	▼0.76%
Republican Party of India (Khobragade) 1 / 288 (0.3%)	42	1	▼1	239,286	1.36%	▼0.05%
Republican Party of India	36	0	▼2	132,798	0.76%	▼0.30%
All India Forward Bloc	1	0	▼3	5,598	0.03%	▼0.79%
Independents 10 / 288 (3%)	612	10	▼18	1,409,177	8.03%	▼6.03%
Total	1537	288	Steady	17,548,655	53.30%	▼14.29%

=== Manipur ===
Party	Votes	%	Seats	+/–
Indian National Congress (I)	158,127	21.63	13	New
Janata Party	144,112	19.71	10	New
Indian National Congress (U)	69,319	9.48	6	New
Communist Party of India	53,055	7.26	5	–1
Manipur Peoples Party	48,196	6.59	4	–16
Janata Party (Secular)	20,667	2.83	0	New
Kuki National Assembly	20,600	2.82	2	–
Communist Party of India (Marxist)	4,168	0.57	1	+1
Janata Party (JP)	924	0.13	0	New
Independents	211,855	28.98	19	+14
Total	731,023	100.00	60	0
Valid votes	731,023	97.55		
Invalid/blank votes	18,381	2.45		
Total votes	749,404	100.00		
Registered voters/turnout	909,268	82.42		
Source: ECI

=== Odisha ===
Summary of results of the 1980 Odisha Legislative Assembly election
Political Party	Flag	Seats Contested	Won	Net Change in seats	% of Seats	Votes	Vote %	Change in vote %
Indian National Congress (I)		147	118	"NEW"	80.27	30,37,487	47.78	"NEW"
Indian National Congress (U)		98	2	"NEW"	1.36	4,46,818	10.49	"NEW"
Bharatiya Janata Party		28	0	NA	0	86,421	7.09	NA
Communist Party of India		27	4	0	3.57	2,33,971	2.72	▼3.4
Independent		248	7	N/A	4.76	7,55,087	15.77	N/A
		Total Seats	147 (▲7)	Voters	1,39,09,115	Turnout	65,49,074 (47.08%)	

=== Puducherry ===
Party	Votes	%	Seats	+/–
Dravida Munnetra Kazhagam	68,030	27.73	14	▲11
Indian National Congress (Indira)	58,680	23.92	10	▲8
Janata Party	22,892	9.33	3	▼4
Communist Party of India (Marxist)	4,944	2.02	1	▲1
Others	64,778	26.40	0	0
Independents	26,001	10.60	2	▼1
Total	245,325	100.00	30	0
Valid votes	245,325	95.60		
Invalid/blank votes	11,278	4.40		
Total votes	256,603	100.00		
Registered voters/turnout	319,137	80.41		
Source: ECI

=== Punjab ===
Result of Punjab Legislative Assembly election 1980
Party	contested	Seats won	change in seats	popular vote	%
Indian National Congress	117	63	▲46	28,25,827	45.19%
Shiromani Akali Dal	73	37	▼21	16,83,266	26.92%
Communist Party of India	18	9	▲2	4,03,718	6.46%
Communist Party of India (Marxist)	13	5	▼3	2,53,985	4.06%
Bharatiya Janata Party	41	1	(new)	4,05,106	6.48%
Independents	376	2	Steady	4,07,799	6.52%
Others	84	0	-	2,73,215	4.36%
Total	722	117		62,52,916	

=== Rajasthan ===
Party	Votes	%	Seats	+/–
Indian National Congress (Indira)	3,975,315	42.96	133	New
Bharatiya Janata Party	1,721,321	18.60	32	New
Janata Party (Secular)	883,926	9.55	7	New
Janata Party	679,193	7.34	8	New
Indian National Congress (Urs)	516,887	5.59	6	New
Communist Party of India (Marxist)	111,476	1.20	1	0
Communist Party of India	89,382	0.97	1	0
Janata Party (Secular - Raj Narain)	63,321	0.68	0	New
Akhil Bharatiya Ram Rajya Parishad	1,558	0.02	0	0
Republican Party of India	55	0.00	0	New
Indian Union Muslim League	35	0.00	0	0
Independents	1,210,295	13.08	12	+7
Total	9,252,764	100.00	200	0
Valid votes	9,252,764	98.20		
Invalid/blank votes	169,206	1.80		
Total votes	9,421,970	100.00		
Registered voters/turnout	18,452,344	51.06		
Source: ECI

=== Tamil Nadu ===
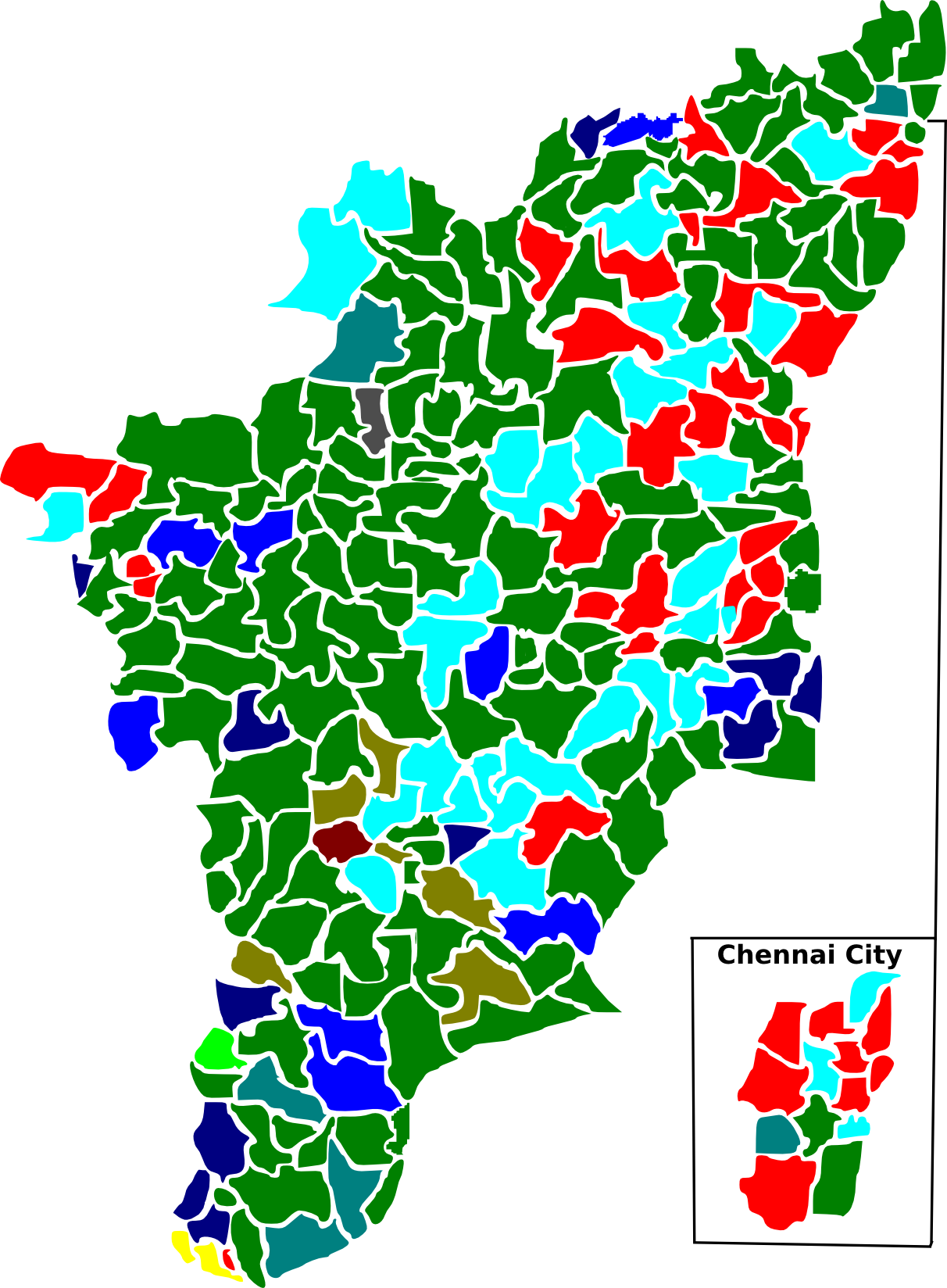
Election map of results based on parties. Colours are based on the results table on the left

Summary of the 1980 May Tamil Nadu Legislative Assembly election results
Alliance/Party	Seats won	Change	Popular Vote	Vote %	Adj. %^{‡}
AIADMK+ alliance	162	+14	9,328,839	48.9%	
AIADMK	129	-1	7,303,010	38.8%	50.4%
CPI(M)	11	-1	596,406	3.2%	47.6%
CPI	9	+4	501,032	2.7%	43.9%
GKC	6	+6	322,440	1.7%	44.1%
IND	6	+6	488,296	2.6%	
FBL	1	–	65,536	0.4%	44.6%
INC(U)	0	–	52,119	0.3%	29.3%
DMK+ alliance	69	-6	8,371,718	44.4%	
DMK	37	-11	4,164,389	22.1%	45.7%
INC(I)	31	+4	3,941,900	20.9%	43.4%
IND	1	+1	265,429	1.4%	
Others	3	-8	1,144,449	6.1%	
JNP(JP)	2	-8	522,641	2.8%	6.9%
IND	1	–	598,897	3.2%	–
Total	234	–	18,845,006	100%	–

‡: Vote % reflects the percentage of votes the party received compared to the entire electorate that voted in this election. Adjusted (Adj.) Vote %, reflects the % of votes the party received per constituency that they contested.
Sources: Election Commission of India and Keesing's Report

=== Uttar Pradesh ===
Party name	Seats
Indian National Congress (INC)	309
Janata Party (Secular) (JNP (SC))	59
Indian National Congress (U) (INC (U))	13
Bharatiya Janata Party (BJP)	11
Communist Party of India (CPI)	6
Janata Party (JNP(JP))	4
Janata Party (Secular) (JNP(SR))	4
Soshit Samaj Dal (Akhil Bharatiya) (SSD)	1
Independent	17
Total	425
