= 1978 elections in India =

Elections in India
- 1978

Elections in the Republic of India in 1978 included elections to seven state legislative assemblies.

== Overall result ==
Date(s)	State	Government before	Chief Minister before	Government after	Elected Chief Minister	Maps
25 February 1978	Andhra Pradesh	Indian National Congress (R)	Jalagam Vengala Rao	Indian National Congress (I)	Marri Channa Reddy	
25 February 1978	Arunachal Pradesh	New State was created		Janata Party	Prem Khandu Thungan	
25 February 1978	Assam	Indian National Congress	Sarat Chandra Sinha	Janata Party	Golap Borbora	
25 February 1978	Karnataka	President's Rule		Indian National Congress (I)	D. Devaraj Urs	
25 February 1978	Meghalaya	All Party Hill Leaders Conference	Williamson A. Sangma	All Party Hill Leaders Conference	Darwin Diengdoh Pugh	
25 February 1978	Maharashtra	Indian National Congress	Vasantdada Patil	Indian National Congress (I)	Vasantdada Patil	
25 February 1978	Maharashtra	Indian National Congress	Vasantdada Patil	Indian National Congress (U)	Vasantdada Patil	
17 and 20 May 1978	Mizoram	Mizo Union (contested as Independent)	C. Chhunga	Mizoram People's Conference	T. Sailo	

== Legislative Assembly elections ==
=== Andhra Pradesh ===
PARTY	SEATS			VOTES POLLED		VOTE % IN
NATIONAL PARTIES	CONTESTED	WON	FD	VOTES	%	SEATS
1. CPI	31	6	12	501452	2.49%	23.40%
2. CPM	22	8	1	546262	2.71%	34.65%
3. INC	257	30	130	3426850	17.01%	19.48%
4 . INC(I)	290	175	18	7908220	39.25%	39.69%
5 . JNP	270	60	36	5812532	28.85%	31.52%
STATE PARTIES						
6. ADK	9	0	9	38691	0.19%	6.22%
7. DMK	2	0	2	6547	0.03%	4.12%
REGISTERED (Unrecognised) PARTIES
8. BCM	2	0	2	2123	0.01%	1.53%
9. RPI	1	0	1	500	0.00%	0.69%
10 . RPK	13	0	11	53497	0.27%	6.03%
11 . RRP	1	0	1	611	0.00%	1.06%
INDEPENDENTS						
12. IND	640	15	593	1852808	9.20%	11.35%
Grand Total :	1538	294	816	20150093		

=== Arunachal Pradesh ===
Party	Votes	%	Seats	+/–
Janata Party	66,906	42.08	17	New
People's Party of Arunachal	48,075	30.24	8	New
Indian National Congress	720	0.45	0	New
Independents	43,287	27.23	5	New
Total	158,988	100.00	30	New
Valid votes	158,988	96.60		
Invalid/blank votes	5,599	3.40		
Total votes	164,587	100.00		
Registered voters/turnout	224,839	73.20		
Source: ECI

=== Assam ===
Sl No	Party	Abbreviation	Party-type	Contested	Won	Votes polled %	Vote % in seats contested
1	Communist Party of India	CPI	National	35	5	4.09	14.39
2	Communist Party of India (Marxist)	CPM	National	27	11	5.62	25.87
3	Indian National Congress	INC	National	126	26	23.62	23.62
4	Indian National Congress (I)	INC(I)	National	115	8	8.78	9.84
5	Janata Party	JNP	National	117	53	27.55	29.95
6	All India Forward Bloc	FBL	State	3	0	0.09	4.28
7	Plain Tribals Council of Assam	PTC	State	9	4	2.60	32.54
8	Revolutionary Socialist Party (India)	RSP	State	6	0	0.44	8.85
9	All India Gorkha League	IGL	Registered	1	0	0.04	6.08
10	Revolutionary Communist Party of India	RCI	Registered	10	4	1.40	17.68
11	Socialist Unity Centre of India	SUC	Registered	4	0	0.07	2.29
12	Independent	IND			15	25.67	26.50
	Total				126		
Source: Statistical Report on Legislative Assembly election of Assam, 1978

=== Karnataka ===
Summary of results of the Karnataka Legislative Assembly election, 1978
Political Party	Contestants	Seats won	Seat change	Number of votes	Vote share	Net change
Indian National Congress (Indira)	214	149		5,543,756	44.25%	
Janata Party	222	59		4,754,114	37.95%	
Communist Party of India	6	3	Steady	148,567	1.19%	
Indian National Congress	212	2		1,001,553	7.99%	
Republican Party of India	3	1		22,443	0.18%	
Independents		10	▼10	940,677	7.51%	N/A
Total		224				

=== Maharashtra ===
Summary of results of the Maharashtra State Assembly election, 1978
Political Party	No. of candidates	No. of elected	Number of Votes	% of Votes	Seat change
Janata Party	215	99	5,701,399	27.99%	▲99
Indian National Congress	259	69	5,159,828	25.33%	▼159
Indian National Congress (Indira)	203	62	3,735,308	18.34%	▲62
Peasants and Workers Party of India	88	13	1,129,172	5.54%	▲6
Communist Party of India (Marxist)	12	9	345,008	1.69%	▲8
All India Forward Bloc	6	3	166,497	0.82%	▲1
Republican Party of India	25	2	215,487	1.06%	Steady
Republican Party of India (Khobragade)	23	2	287,533	1.41%	▲2
Communist Party of India	48	1	301,056	1.48%	▼1
Independents	894	28	2,864,023	14.06%	▲5
Total	1819	288	20,367,221	100%	

=== Meghalaya ===
Parties and coalitions	Popular vote			Seats	
Parties and coalitions	Votes	%	±pp	Won	+/−
Indian National Congress (INC)	109,654	28.96	19.07 ▲	20	11 ▲
All Party Hill Leaders Conference (APHLC)	94,362	24.92	10.75 ▼	16	16 ▼
Hill State People's Democratic Party (HSPDP)	72,852	19.24		14^{[a]}	
Indian National Congress (I)	5,447	1.44		0	
Communist Party of India	2,361	0.62	0.05 ▲	0	Steady
Independents (IND)	93,970	24.82	29.04 ▼	10^{[b]}	9 ▼
Total	378,646	100.00		60	±0
Source: Election Commission of India

^{a} The HSPDP won 8 seats in the 1972 election, but the party's representatives were recorded as independents at the time of that election.

^{b} Two candidates from the PDIC were elected, but the party had not obtained registration in time for the election; the party's representatives were recorded as independents in the official results.

=== Mizoram ===
Party	Votes	%	Seats	+/–
Mizoram People's Conference	52,640	37.47	22	▲22
Independents	87,830	62.53	8	▼16
Total	140,470	100.00	30	0
Valid votes	140,470	98.71		
Invalid/blank votes	1,838	1.29		
Total votes	142,308	100.00		
Registered voters/turnout	224,936	63.27		
Source: ECI
