= 1969 elections in India =

Elections in India
- 1969

Elections in the Republic of India in 1969 included elections to six state legislative assemblies and to seats in the Rajya Sabha.

== Legislative Assembly elections ==
1969 elections in India

=== Bihar ===
Party	Votes	%	Seats
Indian National Congress	4,570,413	30.46	118
Bharatiya Jana Sangh	2,345,780	15.63	34
Samyukta Socialist Party	2,052,274	13.68	52
Communist Party of India	1,515,105	10.10	25
Praja Socialist Party	846,563	5.64	18
Loktantrik Congress Dal	573,344	3.82	9
Shoshit Dal	552,764	3.68	6
Janata Party	501,010	3.34	14
Bharatiya Kranti Dal	301,010	2.01	6
Communist Party of India (Marxist)	187,541	1.25	3
Swatantra Party	130,638	0.87	3
Bihar Prant Hul Jharkhand	56,506	0.38	5
Backward Classes Party of India	38,995	0.26	0
Proutist Bloc of India	29,675	0.20	0
Socialist Unity Centre of India	26,259	0.18	0
All India Forward Bloc	17,452	0.12	1
Revolutionary Socialist Party	6,310	0.04	0
Republican Party of India	5,057	0.03	0
Akhil Bharatiya Hindu Mahasabha	2,161	0.01	0
Bihar Prantiya Sudharavadi Party	855	0.01	0
Akhil Bharatiya Ram Rajya Parishad	811	0.01	0
Independents	1,243,106	8.29	24
Total	15,003,629	100.00	318
Valid votes	15,003,629	97.08	
Invalid/blank votes	451,530	2.92	
Total votes	15,455,159	100.00	
Registered voters/turnout	29,274,251	52.79	
Source: ECI

=== Nagaland ===
Party	Votes	%	Seats	+/–
Nagaland Nationalist Organisation	53,507	38.66	22	New
United Front of Nagaland	30,109	21.76	10	New
Independents	54,783	39.58	8	–32
Total	138,399	100.00	40	0
Valid votes	138,399	99.81		
Invalid/blank votes	259	0.19		
Total votes	138,658	100.00		
Registered voters/turnout	176,931	78.37		
Source: ECI

=== Pondicherry ===
Party	Votes	%	Seats	+/–
Indian National Congress	78,052	42.62	10	▼12
Dravida Munnetra Kazhagam	61,717	33.70	15	New
Communist Party of India	23,115	12.62	3	New
Independents	20,250	11.06	2	▼2
Total	183,134	100.00	30	0
Valid votes	183,134	98.13		
Invalid/blank votes	3,497	1.87		
Total votes	186,631	100.00		
Registered voters/turnout	228,754	81.59		
Source: ECI

=== Punjab ===
Result of Punjab Legislative Assembly election 1969
Party	contested	Seats won	change in seats	popular vote	%
Shiromani Akali Dal	65	43	▲43	13,81,916	29.36
Indian National Congress	103	38	▼10	18,44,360	39.18
Bharatiya Jana Sangh	30	8	▼1	4,24,008	9.01
Communist Party of India	28	4	▼1	2,27,600	4.84
Communist Party of India (Marxist)	10	2	▼1	1,44,610	3.07
Socialist Party	7	2	▲1	39,109	0.83
Punjab Janta Party	16	1	▲1	79,269	1.68
Praja Socialist Party	3	1	▲1	23,617	0.50
Swatantra Party	6	1	▲1	43,006	0.91
Independents	160	4	▼5	4,18,232	8.89
Others	43	0		81,359	1.72
Total	471	104		47,07,086	

=== Uttar Pradesh ===
Party	Votes	%	Seats	+/–
Indian National Congress	7,893,152	33.69	211	+12
Bharatiya Kranti Dal	4,989,116	21.29	98	New
Bharatiya Jana Sangh	4,200,175	17.93	49	–49
Samyukta Socialist Party	1,831,345	7.82	33	–11
Republican Party of India	815,964	3.48	1	–9
Communist Party of India	715,092	3.05	4	–9
Praja Socialist Party	401,999	1.72	3	–8
Swatantra Party	293,781	1.25	5	–7
Communist Party of India (Marxist)	114,616	0.49	1	0
Uttar Pradesh Kisan Mazdoor Party	112,552	0.48	1	New
Hindu Mahasabha	67,807	0.29	1	New
Others	333,068	1.42	0	–
Independents	1,661,887	7.09	18	–19
Total	23,430,554	100.00	425	0
Valid votes	23,430,554	96.72		
Invalid/blank votes	794,232	3.28		
Total votes	24,224,786	100.00		
Registered voters/turnout	44,812,431	54.06		
Source: ECI

=== West Bengal ===
Party	Votes	%	Seats	+/–
Communist Party of India (Marxist)	2,676,981	19.97	80	▲37
Indian National Congress	5,538,622	41.32	55	▼72
Bangla Congress	1,094,654	8.17	33	▼1
Communist Party of India	938,472	7.00	30	▲14
All India Forward Bloc	671,664	5.01	21	▲8
Revolutionary Socialist Party (India)	375,983	2.80	12	▲6
Samyukta Socialist Party	249,362	1.86	9	▲2
Socialist Unity Centre of India	202,721	1.51	7	▲3
Praja Socialist Party	175,890	1.31	5	▼2
Lok Sewak Sangh	99,844	0.74	4	NA
Akhil Bharatiya Gorkha League	71,665	0.53	4	NA
Progressive Muslim League (West Bengal)	208,574	1.56	3	NA
Revolutionary Communist Party of India	51,181	0.38	2	NA
Workers Party of India	47,391	0.35	2	NA
Indian National Democratic Front	118,650	0.89	1	NA
Marxist Forward Bloc	27,143	0.20	1	NA
Others	374,421	2.79	0	0
Independents	481,092	3.59	11	▼20
Total	13,404,310	100.00	280	0
Valid votes	13,404,310	97.43		
Invalid/blank votes	353,762	2.57		
Total votes	13,758,072	100.00		
Registered voters/turnout	20,685,110	66.51		
Source: ECI
