= 1962 elections in India =

Elections in India
- 1962

== Legislative Assembly elections ==
=== Andhra Pradesh ===
PARTY	SEATS			VOTES POLLED		VOTE % IN
NATIONAL PARTIES	CONTESTED	WON	FD	VOTES	%	SEATS
CPI	136	51	8	2282767	19.53%	40.58%
INC	300	177	1	5523359	47.25%	47.25%
JS	70	0	69	121721	1.04%	4.17%
PSP	6	0	4	34732	0.30%	16.17%
SOC	15	2	11	70878	0.61%	12.99%
SWA	141	19	70	1215987	10.40%	21.81%
REP	18	0	17		0.40%	6.43%
IND	302	51	174		20.48%	32.75%
Total	988	300	354			
Source:ECI

=== Assam ===
Party	Votes	%	Seats
Indian National Congress	1,179,305	48.25	79
Praja Socialist Party	310,093	12.69	6
Communist Party of India	156,153	6.39	0
All Party Hill Leaders Conference	134,591	5.51	11
Socialist	36,672	1.50	0
Revolutionary Communist Party	29,249	1.20	1
Jan Sangh	10,887	0.45	0
Achik Assona Chilchakgipa Kotak	5,169	0.21	0
Independents	582,042	23.81	8
Total	2,444,161	100.00	105
Registered voters/turnout	4,942,816	–	
Source: ECI

=== Bihar ===
S. No.	Abbreviation	Party	Seats contested	Seats won
1	SWA	Swatantra Party	259	50
2	SOC	Socialist Party of India	132	7
3	PSP	Praja Socialist Party	199	29
4	JS	Jan Sangh	75	3
5	INC	Indian National Congress	318	185
6	CPI	Communist Party of India	84	12
7	RRP	Ram Rajya Parishad	17	0
8	JP	Jharkhand Party	75	20
9	HMS	Hindu Mahasabha	3	0
10	IND	Independent	367	12

=== Madhya Pradesh ===
Party	Votes	%	Seats	+/–
Indian National Congress	2,527,257	38.54	142	▼90
Bharatiya Jana Sangh	1,092,237	16.66	41	▲31
Praja Socialist Party	703,188	10.72	33	▲21
Socialist Party	310,181	4.73	14	New
Akhil Bharatiya Ram Rajya Parishad	248,525	3.79	10	▲5
Hindu Mahasabha	211,639	3.23	6	▼1
Swatantra Party	80,470	1.23	2	New
Communist Party of India	132,440	2.02	1	▼1
Republican Party of India	82,345	1.26	0	New
All India Forward Bloc	16,913	0.26	0	New
Independents	1,151,955	17.57	39	▲19
Total	6,557,150	100.00	288	0
Valid votes	6,557,150	73.71		
Invalid/blank votes	2,338,719	26.29		
Total votes	8,895,869	100.00		
Registered voters/turnout	15,874,238	56.04		
Source: ECI

=== Madras ===
Party	Popular Vote	Vote %	Seats contested	Seats won	Change
Indian National Congress	5,848,974	46.14%	206	139	-12
Dravida Munnetra Kazhagam	3,435,633	27.10%	143	50	+37
Swatantra Party	991,773	7.82%	94	6	+6
Forward Bloc	173,261	1.37%	6	3	+3
Communist Party of India	978,806	7.72%	68	2	-2
Socialist	48,753	0.38%	7	1	–
Praja Socialist Party	159,212	1.26%	21	0	-2
We Tamils	117,640	0.93%	16	0	–
Indian Union Muslim League	89,968	0.71%	6	0	–
Republican	57,457	0.45%	4	0	–
Tamil National Party	44,048	0.35%	9	0	–
Socialist Labour	43,186	0.34%	7	0	–
Jan Sangh	10,743	0.08%	4	0	–
Independents	676,892	5.34%	207	5	-17
Total	12,676,346	100%	—	206	—

=== Maharashtra ===
Political Party	No. of candidates	No. of elected	Votes polled	Votes (%)
Indian National Congress	264	215	5,617,347	51.22%
Peasants and Workers Party of India	79	15	818,801	7.47%
Praja Socialist Party	101	9	792,755	7.23%
Communist Party of India	56	6	647,390	5.90%
Republican Party of India	66	3	589,653	5.38%
Socialist	14	1	54,764	0.50%
Independents	437	15	1,836,095	16.74%

=== Mysore ===
Summary of results of the Mysore Legislative Assembly election, 1962
Political Party	Contestants	Seats won	Seat change	Number of votes	Vote share	Net change
Indian National Congress	208	138	▼12	3,164,811	50.22%	▼1.80
Praja Socialist Party	84	20	▲2	887,363	14.08%	▲0.02
Swatantra Party	59	9		450,713	7.15%	
Maharashtra Ekikaran Samiti	6	6		136878	2.17%	
Lok Sewak Sangh	17	4		159,545	2.53%	
Independents		27	▼9	1,091,011	17.31%	N/A
Total		208				

=== Punjab ===
Result of Punjab Legislative Assembly election 1962
Party	Contestants	Seats won	Popular vote	%
Indian National Congress	154	90	29,46,209	43.72
Shiromani Akali Dal	46	16	7,99,925	11.87
Communist Party of India	47	12	4,78,333	7.10
Bharatiya Jana Sangh	80	8	6,55,160	9.72
Socialist Party	8	4	93,801	1.39
Swatantra Party	42	3	2,61,276	3.88
Haryana Lok Samiti	8	3	1,29,036	1.91
Independents	330	18	11,57,113	17.17
Others	41	0	2,18,370	3.24
Total	756	154	67,39,223	

=== Rajasthan ===
Party	Votes	%	Seats	+/–
Indian National Congress	2,052,383	39.98	88	–31
Swatantra Party	878,056	17.11	36	New
Bharatiya Jana Sangh	469,497	9.15	15	+9
Communist Party of India	276,972	5.40	5	+4
Socialist Party (India)	189,147	3.68	5	New
Akhil Bharatiya Ram Rajya Parishad	102,988	2.01	3	–14
Praja Socialist Party	74,858	1.46	2	0
Hindu Mahasabha	17,481	0.34	0	New
Independents	1,071,581	20.88	22	–10
Total	5,132,963	100.00	176	0
Valid votes	5,132,963	78.28		
Invalid/blank votes	1,424,303	21.72		
Total votes	6,557,266	100.00		
Registered voters/turnout	10,327,596	63.49		
Source: ECI

=== West Bengal ===
Party	No. of candidates	No. of elected	No. of votes	%
Indian National Congress	252	157	4.522,476	47.29%
Communist Party of India	145	50	2,386,834	24.96%
Praja Socialist Party	87	5	477,254	4.99%
All India Forward Bloc	34	13	441,098	4.06%
Revolutionary Socialist Party	17	9	245,261	2.56%
Akhil Bharatiya Hindu Mahasabha	25	0	76,138	0.80%
Socialist Unity Centre of India	11	0	69,844	0.73%
Lok Sewak Sangh	11	4	68,583	0.72%
Sanjukta Biplabi Parisha	16	1	58,806	0.62%
Swatantra Party	24	0	55,447	0.58%
Bharatiya Jana Sangh	25	0	43,483	0.45%
All India Gorkha League	4	2	38,076	0.40%
Workers Party of India	8	0	26,913	0.24%
Socialist Party	7	0	2,663	0.03%
Independents	295	11	1,050,515	10.98%
Total:	935	252	10,469,803	
