= 1951–52 elections in India =

Elections in India
- 1951-1952

The Indian Republic held its first elections in 1951–52.

== Presidential election ==
The Election Commission of India held the first presidential elections of India on May 2, 1952. Dr. Rajendra Prasad won his first election with 670000 votes over his nearest rival K.T. Shah who got 92,827 votes.

== General election ==
General elections to the first Lok Sabha since independence were held in India between 25 October 1951 and 21 February 1952. The Indian National Congress (INC) stormed into power, winning 364 of the 489 seats. Pandit Jawaharlal Nehru became the first democratically elected Prime Minister of the country.

Party	Votes	%	Seats
Indian National Congress	47,665,951	44.99	364
Socialist Party	11,216,719	10.59	12
Kisan Mazdoor Praja Party	6,135,978	5.79	9
Communist Party of India	3,487,401	3.29	16
Bharatiya Jana Sangh	3,246,361	3.06	3
Scheduled Castes Federation	2,521,695	2.38	2
Akhil Bharatiya Ram Rajya Parishad	2,091,898	1.97	3
Krishikar Lok Party	1,489,615	1.41	1
People's Democratic Front	1,367,404	1.29	7
Shiromani Akali Dal	1,047,611	0.99	4
Hindu Mahasabha	1,003,034	0.95	4
Peasants and Workers Party of India	992,187	0.94	2
Forward Bloc (Marxist)	963,058	0.91	1
All India Ganatantra Parishad	959,749	0.91	6
Tamil Nadu Toilers' Party	889,292	0.84	4
Jharkhand Party	749,702	0.71	3
Revolutionary Socialist Party	468,108	0.44	3
Commonweal Party	325,398	0.31	3
Lok Sewak Sangh	309,940	0.29	2
Zamindar Party	291,300	0.27	0
Chota Nagpur Santhal Parganas Janata Party	236,094	0.22	1
Uttar Pradesh Praja Party	213,656	0.20	0
S.K. Paksha	137,343	0.13	0
All India Forward Bloc (Ruikar)	133,936	0.13	0
Kamgar Kisan Paksha	132,574	0.13	0
Tribal Sangha	116,629	0.11	0
Travancore Tamil Nadu Congress	115,893	0.11	1
Kerala Socialist Party	102,098	0.10	0
Indian Union Muslim League	79,470	0.08	1
Revolutionary Communist Party of India	67,275	0.06	0
Justice Party	63,254	0.06	0
All India United Kisan Sabha	60,254	0.06	0
All India Republican Party (RPP)	57,815	0.05	0
All India Republican Party (REP)	44,286	0.04	0
All People's Party	36,851	0.03	0
Tamil Nadu Congress Party	36,158	0.03	0
Khasi-Jaintia Durbar	32,987	0.03	0
Saurashtra Khedut Sangh	29,766	0.03	0
Bolshevik Party of India	25,792	0.02	0
All Manipur National Union	22,083	0.02	0
Uttar Pradesh Revolutionary Socialist Party	20,665	0.02	0
Hill People Party	17,350	0.02	0
Praja Party	16,955	0.02	0
Kuki National Association	12,155	0.01	0
Punjab Depressed Class League	11,789	0.01	0
Pursharathi Panchayat	10,778	0.01	0
Cochin Party	8,947	0.01	0
Kisan Mazdoor Mandal	8,808	0.01	0
Hyderabad State Praja Party	7,646	0.01	0
Gandhi Sebak Seva	7,196	0.01	0
Kisan Janta Sanyukta Party	6,390	0.01	0
National Party of India	3,232	0.00	0
Historical Research	1,468	0.00	0
Independents	16,850,089	15.90	37
Appointed members (Note: Six representing Jammu and Kashmir, two representing Anglo-Indians, one representing Part B tribal areas in Assam and one representing the Andaman and Nicobar Islands.)			10
Total	105,950,083	100.00	499
Registered voters/turnout	173,212,343	44.87	
Source: ECI

== Legislative Assembly elections ==
=== Ajmer State^{*} ===
Summary of results of the 1952 Ajmer Legislative Assembly election
Party	Flag	Seats Contested	Won	% of Seats	Votes	Vote %
Indian National Congress		30	20	66.67	1,04,411	44.47
Bharatiya Jana Sangh		15	3	10.00	28,057	11.95
Pursharathi Panchayat		6	3	10.00	15,781	7.72
Communist Party of India		2	0		3,494	1.49
Socialist Party		2	0		1,055	0.45
Independent politician		79	4	13.33	81,990	34.92
Total Seats		30	Voters	4,62,810	Turnout	2,34,788 (50.73%)

^{*} : On 1 November 1956, Ajmer State was merged into Rajasthan under States Reorganisation Act, 1956.

=== Assam ===
Party	Popular vote		Seats	
Party	Vote	%	Contested	Won
Indian National Congress	1,064,850	43.48	92	76
Socialist Party	3,25,690	13.30	61	4
Kisan Mazdoor Praja Party	1,46,792	5.99	40	1
Communist Party of India	69,431	2.84	18	1
Mizo Union	29,104	1.19	3	3
Khasi-Jaintia Durbar	24,248	0.99	4	1
All People's Party	14,930	0.61	3	1
Garo National Council	14,577	0.60	4	3
Khasi Jaintia Federated State National Conference	9,441	0.39	1	1
Independent	6,93,908	28.34	213	14
Total	49,55,390	100	—	105

=== Bhopal State^{*} ===
Summary of results of the 1952 Bhopal Legislative Assembly election
Political party	Seats contested	Won	% of seats	Votes	Vote %
Indian National Congress	28	25	83.33	1,17,656	52.01
Akhil Bharatiya Hindu Mahasabha	9	1	3.33	31,684	14.01
Independent politician	32	4	13.33	51,736	22.87
Total seats	30	Voters	6,10,182	Turnout	2,26,210 (37.07%)

^{*} : On 1 November 1956, Bhopal State was merged into Madhya Pradesh under States Reorganisation Act, 1956. Bhopal states 1955

=== Bihar^{*} ===
Summary of results of the 1952 Bihar Legislative Assembly election
Political party	Flag	Seats Contested	Won	% of Seats	Votes	Vote %
Indian National Congress		322	239	72.42	39,51,145	41.38
Socialist Party		266	23	6.97	17,29,750	18.11
Kisan Mazdoor Praja Party		98	1	0.30	2,68,416	2.81
Jharkhand Party		53	32	9.70	7,65,272	8.01
Chota Nagpur Santhal Parganas Janata Party		38	11	3.33	3,01,691	3.16
Forward Bloc (Marxist Group)		34	1	0.30	1,07,386	1.12
Akhil Bharatiya Ram Rajya Parishad		29	1	0.30	60,360	0.63
Lok Sewak Sangh		12	7	2.12	1,48,921	1.56
All India Ganatantra Parishad		1	1	0.30	14,237	0.15
Independent		638	14	4.24	18,77,236	19.66
Total seats		330	Voters	2,41,65,389	Turnout	95,48,835 (39.51%)

Party wise votes polled
1. Indian National Congress (41.4%)
2. Jharkhand Party (8.01%)
3. Socialist Party (18.1%)
4. CNSPJP (3.16%)
5. Lok Sewak Sangh (1.56%)
6. Independent (19.7%)
7. Others (8.12%)

^{*} : Bihar was reduced slightly by the transfer of minor territories to West Bengal in 1956 under States Reorganisation Act, 1956.

=== Bombay State^{*} ===
Summary of results of the 1952 Bombay Legislative Assembly election
Political party	Flag	Seats contested	Won	Votes	Vote %
Indian National Congress 270 / 315 (86%)		313	270	55,56,334	49.95%
Peasants and Workers Party of India 14 / 315 (4%)		87	14	7,17,963	6.45%
Socialist Party 9 / 315 (3%)		182	9	13,30,246	11.96%
Kamgar Kisan Paksha 2 / 315 (0.6%)		33	2	2,48,130	2.23%
Scheduled Castes Federation 1 / 315 (0.3%)		37	1	3,44,718	3.10%
Communist Party of India 1 / 315 (0.3%)		25	1	1,59,994	1.44%
Krishikar Lok Party 1 / 315 (0.3%)		16	1	1,07,408	0.97%
Kisan Mazdoor Praja Party		67	0	5,59,492	5.03%
Akhil Bharatiya Ram Rajya Parishad		37	0	1,24,466	1.12%
Akhil Bharatiya Hindu Mahasabha		9	0	35,194	0.32%
Forward Bloc (Marxist Group)		8	0	16,847	0.15%
Akhil Bharatiya Jana Sangh		2	0	4,876	0.04%
Independent 19 / 315 (6%)		427	19	19,17,574	17.24%
Total		1243	317	Turnout (voters) 1,11,23,242 (2,19,04,595)	50.78%

^{*}: On 1 November 1956, under States Reorganisation Act, 1956, Bombay state was re-organized by the addition of Saurashtra State and Kutch State, Nagpur Division of Madhya Pradesh, and Marathwada region of Hyderabad. The state's southernmost districts of Bombay were transferred to Mysore State while Abu Road taluka of the Banaskantha district was transferred to Rajasthan.

=== Coorg State^{*} ===
Party	Votes	%	Seats
Indian National Congress	48,845	55.54	15
Communist Party of India	1,386	1.58	0
Independent	37,716	42.88	9
Total	87,947	100.00	24
Valid votes	87,947	100.00	
Invalid/blank votes	0	0.00	
Total votes	87,947	100.00	
Registered voters/turnout	138,440	63.53	

^{*} : On 1 November 1956, Coorg State was merged into Mysore State as per the States Reorganisation Act, 1956.

=== Delhi^{*} ===
Summary of results of the 1952 Delhi Legislative Assembly election
Party	Seats Contested	Won	% of Seats	Votes	Vote %
Indian National Congress	47	39	81.25	271,812	52.09
Bharatiya Jana Sangh	31	5	10.42	114,207	21.89
Scheduled Castes Federation	5	0	0	15,592	2.99
Kisan Mazdoor Praja Party	7	0	0	13,646	2.62
Socialist Party	6	2	4.17	12,396	2.38
Akhil Bharatiya Hindu Mahasabha	5	1	2.08	6,891	1.32
Communist Party of India	1	0	0	2,591	0.50
Akhil Bharatiya Ram Rajya Parishad	4	0	0	849	0.16
Forward Bloc (Marxist Group)	1	0	0	503	0.10
Revolutionary Socialist Party	1	0	0	307	0.06
Independent	78	1	2.08	82,972	15.90
Total Seats	48	Voters	744,668	Turnout	521,766 (58.52%)

^{*} : On 1 November 1956, under States Reorganisation Act, 1956, Delhi was made a Union Territory under the direct administration of the President of India and the Delhi Legislative Assembly was abolished simultaneously. Next legislative assembly elections in Delhi were held in 1993, when Union Territory of Delhi was formally declared as National Capital Territory of Delhi by the Sixty-ninth Amendment to the Indian constitution.

=== Himachal Pradesh^{*} ===
Summary of results of the 1952 Himachal Pradesh Legislative Assembly election
Political party	Flag	Seats Contested	Won	% of Seats	Votes	Vote %
Indian National Congress		35	24	66.67	84,819	47.25
Kisan Mazdoor Praja Party		22	3	8.33	26,371	14.69
Scheduled Caste Federation		9	1	2.78	10,352	5.77
Independent		36	8	22.22	47,746	26.6
Total seats		36	Voters	7,13,554	Turnout	1,79,515 (25.16%)

^{*} : Under States Reorganisation Act, 1956, Himachal Pradesh became a Union Territory on 1 November 1956, under the direct administration of the President of India and the Himachal Pradesh Legislative Assembly was abolished simultaneously. Under Punjab Reorganisation Act, 1966, it became a state and the next legislative elections were held in 1967.

=== Hyderabad State^{*} ===
Summary of results of the 1952 Hyderabad Legislative Assembly election
Political party	Flag	Seats Contested	Won	% of Seats	Votes	Vote %
Indian National Congress		173	93	53.14	21,77,716	41.86
Socialist Party		97	11	6.29	5,90,209	11.35
People's Democratic Front		77	42	24.00	10,80,092	20.76
Scheduled Castes Federation		24	5	2.86	2,66,482	5.12
Peasants and Workers Party of India		21	10	5.71	2,15,992	4.15
Independent		136	14	8.00	7,58,318	14.58
Total seats		175	Voters	1,21,14,635	Turnout	52,02,214 (42.94%)

^{*} : On 1 November 1956, Hyderabad State, except the districts of Raichur, Gulbarga, Bidar and Marathwada, was merged into Andhra State to form a single state, Andhra Pradesh, under States Reorganisation Act, 1956. The districts of Raichur, Bidar and Gulbarga were transferred to the Mysore State, while the Marathwada district was merged with the Bombay State.

=== Madhya Bharat^{*} ===
Summary of results of the 1952 Madhya Bharat Legislative Assembly election
Political party	Flag	Seats Contested	Won	% of Seats	Votes	Vote %
Indian National Congress		99	75	75.76	9,38,918	47.24
Socialist Party		59	4	4.04	1,45,845	7.34
Bharatiya Jana Sangh		42	4	4.04	1,93,627	9.74
Akhil Bharatiya Ram Rajya Parishad		39	2	2.02	1,43,132	7.20
Akhil Bharatiya Hindu Mahasabha		33	11	11.11	2,36,824	11.92
Independent		131	3	3.03	2,58,157	12.99
Total seats		99	Voters	57,23,673	Turnout	19,87,410 (34.72%)

^{*} : On 1 November 1956, under States Reorganisation Act, 1956, Madhya Bharat (except the Sunel enclave of the Mandsaur district) was merged into Madhya Pradesh and the Sunel enclave of the Mandsaur district of Madhya Bharat was merged in Rajasthan.

=== Madhya Pradesh^{*} ===
Party	Votes	%	Seats
Indian National Congress	3,434,058	49.07	194
Socialist Party	661,874	9.46	2
Kisan Mazdoor Praja Party	365,371	5.22	8
Scheduled Castes Federation	283,554	4.05	0
Bharatiya Jana Sangh	250,247	3.58	0
Ram Rajya Parishad	175,324	2.51	3
S.K. Paksha	101,670	1.45	2
Forward Bloc (Ruikar)	45,487	0.65	0
Forward Bloc Marxist)	40,727	0.58	0
Communist Party of India	24,460	0.35	0
Independent	1,601,565	22.89	23
Others	13,251	0.19	0
Total	6,997,588	100.00	232

^{*} : On 1 November 1956, under States Reorganisation Act, 1956, Madhya Bharat (except the Sunel enclave of the Mandsaur district), Vindhya Pradesh, Bhopal State and the Sironj sub-division of the Kota district of Rajasthan were merged into Madhya Pradesh while the Nagpur Division was transferred to Bombay State.

=== Madras State^{*} ===
Summary of results of the 1952 Madras Legislative Assembly election
Political party	Flag	Seats Contested	Won	% of Seats	Votes	Vote %	Govt. Formation
Indian National Congress		367	152	40.53	69,88,701	34.88	Leading Party
Socialist Party		163	13	3.47	12,99,282	6.48	Leading Party
Kisan Mazdoor Praja Party		148	35	9.33	18,03,377	9.00	^{**}Full support
Communist Party of India		131	62	16.53	26,40,337	13.18	^{**}Full support
Krishikar Lok Party^{#}		63	15	4.00	6,29,893	3.14	^{*}Outside support, joined the cabinet in 1954
Republican Party of India		37	2	0.53	3,39,680	1.70	^{*}Outside support, joined the cabinet in 1954
Tamil Nadu Toilers' Party^{*}		34	19	5.07	8,52,330	4.25	^{*}Outside support, joined the cabinet in 1954
Commonweal Party^{**}		13	6	1.60	2,18,288	1.09	^{*}Outside support, joined the cabinet in 1954
Madras State Muslim League Party^{**}		13	5	1.33	1,86,546	0.93	^{#}3 KLP legislators and 15 Independents joined Congress
Justice Party		9	1	0.27	82,231	0.41	^{#}3 KLP legislators and 15 Independents joined Congress
All India Forward Bloc		6	3	0.80	1,38,203	0.69	^{#}3 KLP legislators and 15 Independents joined Congress
Independent^{#}		667	62	16.53	47,58,768	23.75	^{#}3 KLP legislators and 15 Independents joined Congress
Total seats		375	Voters	3,66,00,615	Turnout	2,00,38,423 (54.75%)	

^{*} : On 1 November 1956, the southern part of Travancore-Cochin (Kanyakumari district) was added to the Madras State while the Malabar district of the state was transferred to the new state of Kerala, and a new union territory, Laccadive, Minicoy and Amindivi Islands, was created.

=== Mysore^{*} ===
Summary of results of the 1952 Mysore Legislative Assembly election
Political party	Flag	Seats contested	Won	% of Seats	Votes	Vote %
Indian National Congress		99	74	74.75	12,76,318	46.35
Kisan Mazdoor Praja Party		59	8	8.08	3,91,653	14.22
Socialist Party		47	3	3.03	240390	8.73
Scheduled Caste Federation		7	2	2.02	47,916	1.74
Communist Party of India		5	1	1.01	25,116	0.91
Independent		154	11	11.11	7,10,359	25.79
Total seats		99	Voters	54,66,487	Turnout	27,53,870 (50.38%)

^{*} : On 1 November 1956, Mysore state was enlarged by the addition of Coorg State, the Kollegal taluk of the Coimbatore district and the South Kanara district (except the Kasaragod taluk) of Madras State, and the Kannada speaking districts from southern Bombay state and western Hyderabad State under States Reorganisation Act, 1956. The Siruguppa taluk, the Bellary taluk, the Hospet taluk and a small area of the Mallapuram sub-taluk were detached from the Mysore State.

=== Summary ===
Polling across the 106 contested constituencies recorded 3,677,046 valid votes out of 10,753,175 exercisable ballots, representing an overall ballot turnout of 34.19%. No single party secured the 71 seats needed for an absolute majority in the 140-member House, resulting in a hung assembly.

Popular vote share by party (1952)
INC	37.87%
Independents	22.94%
AIGP	20.50%
Socialist Party	11.77%
CPI	5.62%
KMPP	0.46%
Forward Bloc (MG)	0.35%
Others (4 parties)	0.49%

Seat share in the Assembly (Total: 140)
INC (67)	47.86%
AIGP (31)	22.14%
Independents (24)	17.14%
Socialist Party (10)	7.14%
CPI (7)	5.00%
Forward Bloc (MG) (1)	0.71%

The Indian National Congress emerged as the single largest party with 67 seats (47.86% of the House)—including five candidates returned uncontested—and 1,392,501 votes (37.87% of total valid votes; 38.20% in the 135 seats it contested). The All India Ganatantra Parishad finished second with 31 seats (22.14% of the House) and 753,685 votes (20.50% statewide), achieving the highest vote share per contested seat of any party at 43.38% across the 58 seats it fought.

The Socialist Party won 10 seats with 432,731 votes (11.77%), while the Communist Party of India won 7 seats with 206,757 votes (5.62%) and the Forward Bloc (Marxist Group) won 1 seat with 12,874 votes (0.35%). None of the candidates fielded by the Kisan Mazdoor Praja Party (7 candidates; 16,948 votes), the Forward Bloc (Ruikar Group) (1 candidate; 2,779 votes), or the three registered unrecognised parties—the People's Independent Party (11,895 votes), the Pursharathi Panchayat (1,841 votes), and the Radical Democratic Party (1,589 votes)—won a seat. Independent candidates won 24 seats (17.14% of the House) and polled 843,446 votes (22.94% statewide), making them the second-largest voting bloc after the Congress.

Summary of results of the 1952 Orissa Legislative Assembly election
Parties	Symbol	No. Of Seats Won	No. Of Seats Contested	Votes	% of votes
Parties Contending for State Govt Formation
Indian National Congress		67	135	1,392,501	37.87%
All India Ganatantra Parishad		31	58	753,685	20.50%
Socialist Party		10	79	432,731	11.77%
Other Parties
Communist Party of India		8	35	219,631	5.97%
Kisan Mazdoor Praja Party		0	7	16,948	0.46%
Independents
Independent		24	208	858,771	23.43%
Total			140	3,677,046	100%

=== Results by district ===
At the time of the 1951–52 election, Orissa was divided into 13 administrative districts. The table below summarises the distribution of constituencies, seats, and winning parties across all 13 districts:

District-wise seat distribution in the 1952 Orissa Legislative Assembly election
Sl. No.	District (1951–52)	Constituencies (Single / Two-member)	Total seats	Seats won by party					
Sl. No.	District (1951–52)	Constituencies (Single / Two-member)	Total seats	INC	GP	SP	CPI	FBL(MG)	IND
1	Koraput (#1–9)	9 (7 / 2)	11	4	7	0	0	0	0
2	Phulbani (#10–12)	3 (2 / 1)	4	1	0	0	0	0	3
3	Dhenkanal (#13–17)	5 (2 / 3)	8	5	0	0	2	0	1
4	Kalahandi (#18–21)	4 (1 / 3)	7	3	4	0	0	0	0
5	Bolangir (#22–27)	6 (3 / 3)	9	0	9	0	0	0	0
6	Sambalpur (#28–35)	8 (3 / 5)	13	6	5	1	0	0	1
7	Sundargarh (#36–39)	4 (3 / 1)	5	3	2	0	0	0	0
8	Keonjhar (#40–42)	3 (1 / 2)	5	0	2	0	0	0	3
9	Mayurbhanj (#43–50)	8 (6 / 2)	10	4	1	4	0	0	1
10	Balasore (#51–60)	10 (8 / 2)	12	11	0	0	0	0	1
11	Cuttack (#61–82)	22 (18 / 4)	26	18	1	3	0	0	4
12	Puri (#83–95)	13 (11 / 2)	15	8	0	1	1	0	5
13	Ganjam (#96–107)	12 (9 / 3)	15	4	0	1	4	1	5
—	Total	107 (74 / 33)	140	67	31	10	7	1	24

=== Patiala & East Punjab States Union ===
Summary of results of the 1952 Patiala & East Punjab States Union Legislative Assembly election
Political party	Flag	Seats Contested	Won	% of Seats	Votes	Vote %
Indian National Congress		51	26	43.33	3,88,185	28.66
Shiromani Akali Dal		41	19	31.67	3,17,502	23.44
Bharatiya Jana Sangh		23	2	3.33	43,809	3.23
Kisan Mazdoor Praja Party		15	1	1.67	20,179	1.49
Communist Party of India		14	2	3.33	64,652	4.77
Lal Communist Party Hind Union		5	1	1.67	21,539	1.59
Scheduled Caste Federation		7	1	1.67	47,216	3.49
Independent		188	8	13.33	3,96,956	29.31
Total seats		60	Voters	22,98,385	Turnout	13,54,476 (58.93%)

=== Punjab^{*} ===
Summary of results of the 1952 Punjab Legislative Assembly election
Political party	Flag	Seats Contested	Won	% of Seats	Votes	Vote %
Indian National Congress		121	96	76.19	18,30,601	36.69
Shiromani Akali Dal		48	13	10.32	6,20,455	12.44
Zamindar Party		31	2	1.59	3,72,126	7.46
Communist Party of India		26	4	3.17	1,93,974	3.89
Forward Bloc (Marxist Group)		19	1	0.79	69,694	1.40
Lal Communist Party Hind Union		9	1	0.79	57,739	1.16
Independent		446	9	7.14	11,92,896	23.91
Total seats		126	Voters	86,23,498	Turnout	49,89,077 (57.85%)

^{*} : Punjab was enlarged by the addition of Patiala & East Punjab States Union in 1956 under States Reorganisation Act of 1956.

=== Rajasthan^{*} ===
Party	Votes	%	Seats
Indian National Congress	1,286,953	39.46	82
Ram Rajya Parishad	399,958	12.26	24
Krishikar Lok Party	270,807	8.30	7
Bharatiya Jana Sangh	193,532	5.93	8
Socialist Party	135,971	4.17	1
Hindu Mahasabha	28,183	0.86	2
Communist Party of India	17,181	0.53	0
Kisan Mazdoor Praja Party	16,411	0.50	1
Independent	896,671	27.49	35
Others	15,775	0.48	0
Total	3,261,442	100.00	160

Congress, with a slim majority of 82 seats, formed a government with Tika Ram Paliwal as the first elected chief minister of Rajasthan. While the leftist parties were the main opposition in India that time, they performed very poorly, barely getting 5% votes polled. The far-right Ram Rajya Parishad served as the main opposition party.

On 1 November 1956, under States Reorganisation Act, 1956, the Ajmer State, the Abu Road taluk of the Banaskantha district of Bombay State, the Sunel enclave of the Mandsaur district and the Lohara sub-tehsil of the Hissar district of the Punjab was merged with Rajasthan while the Sironj sub-division of the Kota district of Rajasthan was transferred to Madhya Pradesh.

=== Saurashtra^{*} ===
Summary of results of the 1952 Saurashtra Legislative Assembly election
Political party	Flag	Seats Contested	Won	% of Seats	Votes	Vote %
Indian National Congress		59	55	91.67	606,934	63.79
Saurashtra Khedut Sangh		37	1	1.67	139,449	14.66
Akhil Bharatiya Hindu Mahasabha		25	0		43,043	4.52
Socialist Party		28	2	3.33	34,778	3.66
Kisan Mazdoor Praja Party		16	0		30,907	3.25
Communist Party of India		3	0		7,791	0.82
Scheduled Castes Federation		3	0		4,977	0.52
Bharatiya Jana Sangh		3	0		4,346	0.46
Akhil Bharatiya Ram Rajya Parishad		1	0		3,660	0.38
Independent		50	2	3.33	75,624	7.95
Total seats		60	Voters	20,81,140	Turnout	9,51,509 (45.72%)

^{*} : On 1 November 1956, Saurashtra State was merged into Bombay State as per the States Reorganisation Act, 1956.

=== Travancore-Cochin ===
Summary of results of the 1952 Travancore-Cochin Legislative Assembly election
Political party	Flag	Seats Contested	Won	% of Seats	Votes	Vote %
Indian National Congress		105	44	40.74	12,04,364	35.44
Socialist Party		70	11	10.19	4,85,194	14.28
Travancore Tamil Nadu Congress		15	8	7.41	2,01,118	5.92
Cochin Party		12	1	0.93	59,535	1.75
Revolutionary Socialist Party		11	6	5.56	1,18,333	3.48
Kerala Socialist Party		10	1	0.93	73,981	2.18
Independent		199	37	34.26	11,51,555	33.89
Total seats		108	Voters	50,54,733	Turnout	33,98,193 (67.23%)

^{$} : In 1952 elections of legislative assembly, no party found the majority. Indian National Congress formed a coalition government with the help of Travancore Tamil Nadu Congress, Kerala Socialist Party and a nominated member.

=== Uttar Pradesh ===
Party	Votes	%	Seats
Indian National Congress	8,032,475	47.93	388
Socialist Party	2,015,320	12.03	20
Bharatiya Jana Sangh	1,081,395	6.45	2
Kisan Mazdoor Praja Party	955,708	5.70	1
Uttar Pradesh Praja Party	301,322	1.80	1
Akhil Bharatiya Ram Rajya Parishad	291,247	1.74	1
Hindu Mahasabha	239,110	1.43	1
Uttar Pradesh Revolutionary Socialist Party	57,284	0.34	1
Others (6 parties)	490,258	2.93	0
Independents	3,294,500	19.66	15
Total	16,758,619	100.00	430

=== Vindhya Pradesh^{*} ===
Summary of results of the 1952 Vindhya Pradesh Legislative Assembly election
Political party	Seats Contested	Won	% of Seats	Votes	Vote %
Indian National Congress	56	40	66.67	2,70,013	39.60
Kisan Mazdoor Praja Party	49	3	5.00	1,10,465	16.2
Socialist Party	46	11	18.33	1,28,187	18.80
Bharatiya Jana Sangh	33	2	3.33	67,330	9.88
Akhil Bharatiya Ram Rajya Parishad	17	2	3.33	30,817	4.52
Independent politician	42	2	3.33	62,102	9.11
Total Seats	60	Voters	24,03,588	Turnout	6,81,799 (28.37%)

^{*} : On 1 November 1956, Vindhya Pradesh was merged into Madhya Pradesh under States Reorganisation Act, 1956.

=== West Bengal^{*} ===
Summary of results of the 1952 West Bengal Legislative Assembly election
Political party	Flag	Seats Contested	Won	% of Seats	Votes	Vote %
Indian National Congress		236	150	63.56	2,889,994	38.82
Kisan Mazdoor Praja Party		129	15	6.36	667,446	8.97
Communist Party of India		86	28	11.86	800,951	10.76
Bharatiya Jana Sangh		85	9	3.81	415,458	5.58
Forward Bloc (Marxist Group)		48	11	4.66	393,591	5.29
Socialist Party		63	0		215,382	2.89
Akhil Bharatiya Hindu Mahasabha		33	4	1.69	1,76,762	2.37
Forward Bloc (Ruikar)		32	2	0.85	1,07,905	1.45
Revolutionary Socialist Party		16	0		63,173	0.85
Revolutionary Communist Party of India (Tagore)		10	0		32,859	0.44
Bolshevik Party of India		8	0		20117	0.27
Akhil Bharatiya Ram Rajya Parishad		14	0		7,100	0.10
Independent		614	19	8.05	1,653,165	22.21
Total seats		238	Voters	17,628,239	Turnout	7,443,903 (42.23%)

^{*} : West Bengal was enlarged slightly by the transfer of minor territories from Bihar in 1956 under States Reorganisation Act, 1956.

== See also ==
- 1954 elections in India
- 1955 elections in India
- 1957 elections in India

== Sources ==
- Election Commission of India (1952). Statistical Report on General Election, 1951 to the Legislative Assembly of Orissa (Report). New Delhi: Election Commission of India.
- Research Branch, Odisha Legislative Assembly (2025). A Brief History of Odisha Legislative Assembly (Report). Bhubaneswar: Odisha Legislative Assembly Secretariat.
- Sukumar Sen (1955). Report on the First General Elections in India, 1951–52, Volume I (General) (Report). New Delhi: Election Commission of India.
