= 1952 Saurashtra Legislative Assembly election =

State Legislative Assembly Elections

- 26 March 1952

60 seats in the Saurashtra Legislative Assembly 31 seats needed for a majority
- Registered: 2,081,140
- Turnout: 45.72%
	Majority party	Minority party
	INC
Party	INC	Saurashtra Khedut Sangh
Seats won	55	1
Popular vote	63.79%	14.66%
Chief Minister of Saurashtra before election
U. N. Dhebar
INC
Elected Chief Minister of Saurashtra
U. N. Dhebar
INC

Indian administrative divisions, as of 1951

Elections to the Legislative Assembly of the Indian state of Saurashtra were held on March 26, 1952. 222 candidates contested for the 55 constituencies in the Assembly. There were 5 two-member constituencies and 50 single-member constituencies.

== Results ==
Summary of results of the 1952 Saurashtra Legislative Assembly election
Political party	Flag	Seats Contested	Won	% of Seats	Votes	Vote %
Indian National Congress		59	55	91.67	606,934	63.79
Saurashtra Khedut Sangh		37	1	1.67	139,449	14.66
Akhil Bharatiya Hindu Mahasabha		25	0		43,043	4.52
Socialist Party		28	2	3.33	34,778	3.66
Kisan Mazdoor Praja Party		16	0		30,907	3.25
Communist Party of India		3	0		7,791	0.82
Scheduled Castes Federation		3	0		4,977	0.52
Bharatiya Jana Sangh		3	0		4,346	0.46
Akhil Bharatiya Ram Rajya Parishad		1	0		3,660	0.38
Independent		50	2	3.33	75,624	7.95
Total seats		60	Voters	20,81,140	Turnout	9,51,509 (45.72%)

== Winning candidates ==
No	Constituency	Winning candidate	Party
1	Kalyanpur	Vasant Kalyanji Hirji	Indian National Congress
2	Khambhalia	Nakum Harilal Ramji	Indian National Congress
3	Bhanvad Jamjodhpur	Patel Keshavji Arjan	Indian National Congress
4	Jamjodhpur Lalpur	Patel Ratanshi Bhanji	Indian National Congress
5	Jamnagar Taluka	Joshi Maganlal Bhagwanji	Indian National Congress
6	Jamnagar City West	Tamboli Fulchand Purshottam	Indian National Congress
7	Jamnagar City (East)	Hamirka Alarakha Hasan	Indian National Congress
8	Kalawad Dhrol	Jadeja Chandrasinhji Dipsin	Independent
9	Dhrol Jodiya	Vaghani Hansaj Jivandas	Indian National Congress
10	Limbdi Wadhwani	Hamir Jiva Vankar	Socialist Party
10	Limbdi Wadhwani	Ghanshyam Oza	Indian National Congress
11	Limbdi Lakhtar	Acharya Labhshanker Devshanker	Indian National Congress
12	Dasada Lakhtar	Desai Bhupatbhai Vrajlal	Indian National Congress
13	Dhrangadhra	Shah Manharlal Mansukhlal	Indian National Congress
14	Halwad Muli	Shukla Labhshanker Maganlal	Indian National Congress
15	Sayla Chotila	Shah Nathalal Mansukhlal	Indian National Congress
16	Paddhari Lodhika Kotdasangani	Shukla Balkrishna Dinmanishanker	Indian National Congress
17	Morvi Malia	Jadeja Kalikakumar Lakhdhirji	Independent
17	Morvi Malia	Abdulla Hamir Kajedia	Indian National Congress
18	Wankaner	Shah Shantilal Rajpal	Indian National Congress
19	Rajkot Taluka	Vekaria Kurji Jadavji	Indian National Congress
20	Rajkot City (North)	Shah Chimanlal Nagardas	Indian National Congress
21	Rajkot City (South)	Kotak Girdharlal Bhawanji	Indian National Congress
22	Jasdan	Prabhatgiri G. Gonsai	Indian National Congress
23	Babra	Joshi Gajanan Bhavanishanker	Indian National Congress
24	Gondal Kunkavav	Patel Govindbhai Keshavji	Indian National Congress
24	Gondal Kunkavav	Bhaskar Haribhai Rana	Indian National Congress
25	Kandorana Bhayavadara	Changela Bhimji Rudabhai	Indian National Congress
26	Upleta	U. N. Dhebar	Indian National Congress
27	Dhoraji	Shah Vajubhai Manilal	Indian National Congress
28	Jetpur	Babubhai P. Vaidya	Indian National Congress
29	Jafrabad Rajula	Laheri Kanubhai Jivanlal	Indian National Congress
30	Mahuva Town	Mehta Jasvantrai Nanubhai	Socialist Party
31	Mahuva Taluka	Modi Jadavji Keshavji	Indian National Congress
32	Kundla	Khimani Amulakhrai K.	Indian National Congress
33	Palitana Chok	Indrani Jorsingh Kasalsingh	Indian National Congress
34	Talaja Datha	Maniar Laloobhai K.	Indian National Congress
35	Bhavnagar City (East)	Vrajlal Gokaldas Vora	Indian National Congress
36	Bhavnagar City (West)	Ajitrai M. Oza	Indian National Congress
37	Bhavnagar (Dascroi) Sihor	Kanbi Karasan Jeram	Indian National Congress
38	Songadh Umrala	Chhaganlal L. Gopani	Indian National Congress
39	Vallabhirur Gadhada	Rewar Kanji Savji	Indian National Congress
39	Vallabhirur Gadhada	Shah Premchand Maganlal	Indian National Congress
40	Lathi	Savani Limba Jasmat	Indian National Congress
41	Liliya	Mohanlal D. Vaghani	Saurashtra Khedut Sangh
42	Junagadh Bhesan	Kathrecha Parmanandas	Indian National Congress
43	Junagadh City	Raja Chittaranjan Rugnath	Indian National Congress
44	Visavadar	Velji Narsi Patel	Indian National Congress
45	Vanthali Manavadar Bantwa	Vikani Ramji Parbat	Indian National Congress
45	Vanthali Manavadar Bantwa	Gohel Jivraj Visram	Indian National Congress
46	Kutiyana Ranavav	Dave Dayashanker Trikamji	Indian National Congress
47	Porbandar City	Bhupta Mathuradas Gordhandas	Indian National Congress
48	Porbandar Taluka	Odedra Maldevji M.	Indian National Congress
49	Mangrol	Jaya Vajubhai Shah	Indian National Congress
50	Keshod	Ratubhai Adani	Indian National Congress
51	Malia Mendarda	Mori Kanji Kachra	Indian National Congress
52	Veraval Town	Pushpaben Mehta	Indian National Congress
53	Veraval Taluka	Joshi Motilal G.	Indian National Congress
54	Talala	Solanki Hamir Sarman	Indian National Congress
55	Una	Veru Suragbhai Kalubhai	Indian National Congress

== State reorganization and merger ==
On 1 November 1956, Saurashtra was merged into Bombay under States Reorganisation Act, 1956.

== See also ==
- Saurashtra State
- 1951–52 elections in India
- Bombay State
- 1957 Bombay Legislative Assembly election
