= Mandya Assembly constituency =

Constituency of the Karnataka legislative assembly in India

Coordinates: 12.52°N 76.90°E

Mandya
- Constituency No. 189 for the Karnataka Legislative Assembly

Constituency details
- Country: India
- Region: South India
- State: Karnataka
- District: Mandya
- Lok Sabha constituency: Mandya
- Established: 1956
- Total electors: 224,370 (2023)
- Reservation: None

Member of Legislative Assembly
- 16th Karnataka Legislative Assembly
- Incumbent Ravikumar Gowda (Ganiga)
- Party: Indian National Congress
- Elected year: 2023
- Preceded by: M. Srinivas

Mandya Assembly constituency is one of the 224 seats in Karnataka Legislative Assembly in India. It is a segment of Mandya Lok Sabha constituency. Ravikumar Gowda is the current MLA from this constituency.

== Members of the Legislative Assembly ==
Election	Member	Party
1952	K. V. Shankara Gowda	Indian National Congress
1954 By-election (Note: Resigned in 1954)	G. S. Bomme Gowda	Indian National Congress
1957	G. S. Bomme Gowda	Independent politician
1962	J. Devaiah	Independent politician
1967	Nagappa	Indian National Congress
1972	M. H. Borauiah	Indian National Congress
1978	M. S. Athmananda	Janata Party
1983	B. Dodda Boregowda	Janata Party
1985	S. D. Jayaram	Janata Party
1989	M. S. Athmananda	Indian National Congress
1994	S. D. Jayaram	Janata Dal
1998 By-election (Note: Died on 27/01/1998)	K. R. Prabhavathi	Janata Dal
1999	M. S. Athmananda	Indian National Congress
2004	M. Srinivas	Janata Dal
2008	M. Srinivas	Janata Dal
2013	M. H. Ambareesh	Indian National Congress
2018	M. Srinivas	Janata Dal
2023	Ravikumar Gowda Ganiga	Indian National Congress

== Election results ==
=== Assembly Election 2023 ===
2023 Karnataka Legislative Assembly election : Mandya
Party	Candidate	Votes	%	±%
INC	Ravikumar Gowda Ganiga	61,411	35.18%	▲6.26
JD(S)	B. R. Ramachandra	59,392	34.03%	▼7.96
BJP	Ashok S. D. Jayaram	30,661	17.57%	▼1.82
Independent	K. S. Vijayananda	15,334	8.79%	New
SKP	Madhuchandan Organic	2,438	1.40%	New
NOTA	None of the above	930	0.53%	▼0.08
Margin of victory		2,019	1.16%	▼11.91
Turnout		174,749	77.88%	▲5.22
Total valid votes		174,546		
Registered electors		224,370		▼1.44
INC gain from JD(S)		Swing	▼6.81	

=== Assembly Election 2018 ===
2018 Karnataka Legislative Assembly election : Mandya
Party	Candidate	Votes	%	±%
JD(S)	M. Srinivas	69,421	41.99%	▲11.96
INC	P. Ravikumar	47,813	28.92%	▼28.32
BJP	N. Shivanna	32,064	19.39%	▲17.43
Independent	Dr. S. C. Shankaregowda	10,564	6.39%	New
Independent	H. C. Shivaramu	1,814	1.10%	New
NOTA	None of the above	1,008	0.61%	New
Margin of victory		21,608	13.07%	▼14.14
Turnout		165,412	72.66%	▲4.08
Total valid votes		165,327		
Registered electors		227,644		▲2.11
JD(S) gain from INC		Swing	▼15.25	

=== Assembly Election 2013 ===
2013 Karnataka Legislative Assembly election : Mandya
Party	Candidate	Votes	%	±%
INC	M. H. Ambareesh	90,329	57.24%	▲33.06
JD(S)	M. Srinivas	47,392	30.03%	▼6.36
BJP	T. L. Ravishankar	3,094	1.96%	▼26.33
SDPI	Mohammad Tahir	3,074	1.95%	New
Independent	Shivaprakash. S. D	2,587	1.64%	New
KJP	D. Venkatesh Achar	1,457	0.92%	New
Independent	H. N. Harish	983	0.62%	New
Margin of victory		42,937	27.21%	▲19.10
Turnout		152,908	68.58%	▲5.95
Total valid votes		157,807		
Registered electors		222,950		▲7.44
INC gain from JD(S)		Swing	▲20.85	

=== Assembly Election 2008 ===
2008 Karnataka Legislative Assembly election : Mandya
Party	Candidate	Votes	%	±%
JD(S)	M. Srinivas	47,265	36.39%	▼10.52
BJP	Vidya Nagendra	36,736	28.29%	New
INC	H. B. Ramu	31,407	24.18%	▼7.88
Independent	Abbas Ali Bohra	3,452	2.66%	New
BSP	T. Varaprasad	3,078	2.37%	▼1.59
Independent	Shivaprakash. S. D	2,740	2.11%	New
SP	C. M. Dyavappa	2,168	1.67%	New
Swarna Yuga Party	C. T. Manjunath	1,435	1.10%	New
Margin of victory		10,529	8.11%	▼6.75
Turnout		129,970	62.63%	▲1.28
Total valid votes		129,871		
Registered electors		207,505		▲26.94
JD(S) hold		Swing	▼10.52	

=== Assembly Election 2004 ===
2004 Karnataka Legislative Assembly election : Mandya
Party	Candidate	Votes	%	±%
JD(S)	M. Srinivas	46,985	46.91%	New
INC	Atmananda Ms	32,105	32.06%	▼23.73
JD(U)	Abbas Ali Bohra	10,832	10.82%	▼25.85
JP	Rudrappa Mr	4,033	4.03%	New
BSP	Ravikeerti. C	3,971	3.96%	▲1.08
Independent	Shivaprakash. S. D	817	0.82%	New
Kannada Nadu Party	Siddegowda. J	672	0.67%	New
Margin of victory		14,880	14.86%	▼4.25
Turnout		100,291	61.35%	▼4.87
Total valid votes		100,154		
Registered electors		163,470		▲7.56
JD(S) gain from INC		Swing	▼8.88	

=== Assembly Election 1999 ===
1999 Karnataka Legislative Assembly election : Mandya
Party	Candidate	Votes	%	±%
INC	M. S. Athmananda	52,703	55.79%	▲23.15
JD(U)	M. Srinivas	34,647	36.67%	New
BSP	V. S. Guruswamy	2,721	2.88%	New
Independent	R. Srinivasa	2,248	2.38%	New
Independent	Arifpasha	1,592	1.69%	New
Margin of victory		18,056	19.11%	▲8.45
Turnout		100,643	66.22%	▲9.19
Total valid votes		94,474		
Rejected ballots		6,141	6.10%	▲5.22
Registered electors		151,982		▲4.31
INC gain from JD		Swing	▲12.49	

=== Assembly By-election 1998 ===
1998 Karnataka Legislative Assembly by-election : Mandya
Party	Candidate	Votes	%	±%
JD	K. R. Prabhavathi	35,654	43.30%	▼14.65
INC	M. B. Srikantha	26,880	32.64%	▲5.11
Lok Shakti	M. Srinivas	19,586	23.79%	New
Margin of victory		8,774	10.66%	▼19.76
Turnout		83,102	57.03%	▼13.80
Total valid votes		82,343		
Rejected ballots		735	0.88%	▼0.81
Registered electors		145,706		▲2.72
JD hold		Swing	▼14.65	

=== Assembly Election 1994 ===
1994 Karnataka Legislative Assembly election : Mandya
Party	Candidate	Votes	%	±%
JD	S. D. Jayaram	57,216	57.95%	▲46.92
INC	M. S. Athmananda	27,183	27.53%	▼28.28
BJP	B. Dodda Boregowda	4,727	4.79%	▲4.26
BSP	H. R. Atheeq Ahamed	3,589	3.63%	New
INC	Ramalingaiah	2,703	2.74%	New
Kranti Sabha	K. Boraiah	1,575	1.60%	▼5.24
Margin of victory		30,033	30.42%	▼0.44
Turnout		100,473	70.83%	▲3.29
Total valid votes		98,736		
Rejected ballots		1,699	1.69%	▼2.84
Registered electors		141,845		▲1.42
JD gain from INC		Swing	▲2.14	

=== Assembly Election 1989 ===
1989 Karnataka Legislative Assembly election : Mandya
Party	Candidate	Votes	%	±%
INC	M. S. Athmananda	50,332	55.81%	▲9.43
JP	S. D. Jayaram	22,503	24.95%	New
JD	Siddaramegowda	9,945	11.03%	New
Kranti Sabha	K. Boraiah	6,173	6.84%	New
Margin of victory		27,829	30.86%	▲25.34
Turnout		94,461	67.54%	▲3.06
Total valid votes		90,184		
Rejected ballots		4,277	4.53%	▲3.18
Registered electors		139,863		▲22.56
INC gain from JP		Swing	▲3.91	

=== Assembly Election 1985 ===
1985 Karnataka Legislative Assembly election : Mandya
Party	Candidate	Votes	%	±%
JP	S. D. Jayaram	37,672	51.90%	▼5.76
INC	M. D. Ramesh Raju	33,668	46.38%	▲6.40
Margin of victory		4,004	5.52%	▼12.16
Turnout		73,579	64.48%	▼6.56
Total valid votes		72,586		
Rejected ballots		993	1.35%	▼0.53
Registered electors		114,114		▲20.75
JP hold		Swing	▼5.76	

=== Assembly Election 1983 ===
1983 Karnataka Legislative Assembly election : Mandya
Party	Candidate	Votes	%	±%
JP	B. Dodda Boregowda	37,984	57.66%	▲8.97
INC	Sadath Ali Khan	26,335	39.98%	▲35.58
Independent	H. R. Atheeq Ahamed	815	1.24%	New
Independent	Nagappa	743	1.13%	New
Margin of victory		11,649	17.68%	▲13.37
Turnout		67,140	71.04%	▼4.67
Total valid votes		65,877		
Rejected ballots		1,263	1.88%	▼0.09
Registered electors		94,505		▲10.01
JP hold		Swing	▲8.97	

=== Assembly Election 1978 ===
1978 Karnataka Legislative Assembly election : Mandya
Party	Candidate	Votes	%	±%
JP	M. S. Athmananda	31,041	48.69%	New
INC(I)	Sadath Ali Khan	28,294	44.38%	New
INC	T. P. Siddegowda	2,808	4.40%	▼44.90
Independent	Deve Gowda	397	0.62%	New
Margin of victory		2,747	4.31%	▲4.06
Turnout		65,040	75.71%	▲11.41
Total valid votes		63,758		
Rejected ballots		1,282	1.97%	▲1.97
Registered electors		85,905		▼6.60
JP gain from INC		Swing	▼0.61	

=== Assembly Election 1972 ===
1972 Mysore State Legislative Assembly election : Mandya
Party	Candidate	Votes	%	±%
INC	M. H. Borauiah	28,552	49.30%	▼4.24
INC(O)	K. V. Shankara Gowda	28,405	49.05%	New
ABJS	S. K. Gundu Rao	953	1.65%	New
Margin of victory		147	0.25%	▼6.82
Turnout		59,142	64.30%	▼8.94
Total valid votes		57,910		
Registered electors		91,979		▲33.61
INC hold		Swing	▼4.24	

=== Assembly Election 1967 ===
1967 Mysore State Legislative Assembly election : Mandya
Party	Candidate	Votes	%	±%
INC	Nagappa	25,462	53.54%	▲7.57
Independent	K. Chikkalingiah	22,099	46.46%	New
Margin of victory		3,363	7.07%	▲5.73
Turnout		50,420	73.24%	▼1.74
Total valid votes		47,561		
Registered electors		68,840		▼1.25
INC gain from Independent		Swing	▲6.22	

=== Assembly Election 1962 ===
1962 Mysore State Legislative Assembly election : Mandya
Party	Candidate	Votes	%	±%
Independent	J. Devaiah	23,299	47.32%	New
INC	K. V. Shankara Gowda	22,639	45.97%	▲4.05
Independent	N. L. Nagappa	3,304	6.71%	New
Margin of victory		660	1.34%	▼3.56
Turnout		52,265	74.98%	▲11.34
Total valid votes		49,242		
Registered electors		69,709		▲15.97
Independent hold		Swing	▲0.50	

=== Assembly Election 1957 ===
1957 Mysore State Legislative Assembly election : Mandya
Party	Candidate	Votes	%	±%
Independent	G. S. Bomme Gowda	17,910	46.82%	New
INC	S. Channaiah	16,035	41.92%	▼16.24
Independent	N. L. Nagappa	4,309	11.26%	New
Margin of victory		1,875	4.90%	▼11.42
Turnout		38,254	63.64%	
Total valid votes		38,254		
Registered electors		60,107		
Independent gain from INC		Swing	▼11.34	

=== Assembly By-election 1954 ===
1954 Mysore State Legislative Assembly by-election : Mandya
Party	Candidate	Votes	%	±%
INC	G. S. Bomme Gowda	14,311	58.16%	▲7.48
PSP	K. Chikkalingiah	10,296	41.84%	New
Margin of victory		4,015	16.32%	▼8.10
Total valid votes		24,607		
INC hold		Swing	▲7.48	

=== Assembly Election 1952 ===
1952 Mysore State Legislative Assembly election : Mandya
Party	Candidate	Votes	%	±%
INC	K. V. Shankara Gowda	12,980	50.68%	New
KMPP	K. Chikkalingiah	6,727	26.27%	New
Independent	M. B. Bore Gowda	5,903	23.05%	New
Margin of victory		6,253	24.42%	
Turnout		25,610	60.05%	
Total valid votes		25,610		
Registered electors		42,645		
INC win (new seat)				

== See also ==
- Mandya District
- List of constituencies of Karnataka Legislative Assembly
