= 1957 elections in India =

Elections in India
- 1957

The 1957 elections in India consists of several elections, including the presidential election, general election, and Legislative Assembly elections.

== Presidential election ==
The Election Commission of India held the second presidential elections of India on May 6, 1957. Dr. Rajendra Prasad won his re-election with 459,698 votes over his nearest rival Chowdhry Hari Ram.

== General election ==
General elections to the second Lok Sabha since independence were held in India between 24 February to 14 March 1957. The Indian National Congress (INC) easily won the second term, winning 371 of the 494 seats and their vote share increased from 45.0% to 47.8%.

== Legislative Assembly elections ==
Legislative Assembly elections in India were conducted for Andhra Pradesh, Assam, Bihar, Bombay, Karnataka, Kerala, Madhya Pradesh, Madras, Odisha, Punjab, Rajasthan, Uttar Pradesh and West Bengal legislative assemblies in 1957.

=== Andhra Pradesh^{*} ===
Party	Votes	%	Seats		
Party	Votes	%	Hold	Won	Total
Indian National Congress	1,707,364	47.38	119	68	187
People's Democratic Front	927,333	25.73	15	22	37
Krishikar Lok Party	0	0.00	22	0	22
Praja Socialist Party	203,453	5.65	13	1	14
Praja Party	28,968	0.80	5	1	6
Scheduled Caste Federation	20,289	0.56	0	1	1
Peasants and Workers Party	37,271	1.03	0	0	0
Bharatiya Jana Sangh	5,809	0.16	0	0	0
Independents	673,098	18.68	22	12	34
Total	3,603,585	100.00	196	105	301

^{*} : On 1 November 1956, Andhra State was merged with Hyderabad State under States Reorganisation Act, 1956, to form a single state, Andhra Pradesh. The districts of Raichur, Gulbarga and the Marathwada district were detached from the Hyderabad State, while merging with Andhra State. In addition, the Siruguppa taluk, the Bellary taluk, the Hospet taluk and a small area of the Mallapuram sub-taluk were transferred from Mysore State to Andhra Pradesh.

=== Assam ===
Results by Party

Party	Popular vote			Seats		
Party	Vote	%	+/-	Contested	Won	+/-
INC	13,21,367	52.35	▲8.87	101	71	▼5
PSP	3,21,569	12.74	▲12.74	36	8	▲8
CPI	2,04,332	8.10	▲5.26	22	4	▲3
IND	676,698	26.81	▼1.53	153	25	▲11
Total	25,23,966	100	—	312	108	▲3

=== Bihar^{*} ===
Summary of results of the 1957 Bihar Legislative Assembly election
Party	Flag	Seats Contested	Won	Net change in seats	% of Seats	Votes	Vote %	Change in vote %
Indian National Congress		312	210	▼29	66.04	44,55,425	42.09	▲0.71
Praja Socialist Party		222	31	New	9.75	16,94,974	16.01	New
Chota Nagpur Santhal Parganas Janata Party		125	23	▲12	7.23	8,29,195	7.83	▲4.67
Jharkhand Party		71	31	▼1	9.75	7,49,021	7.08	▼0.93
Communist Party of India		60	7	▲7	2.20	5,45,577	5.15	▲4.01
Independent		572	16	▲11	5.03	21,81,180	20.61	N/A
		Total seats	318 (▼12)	Voters	2,56,21,144	Turnout	1,05,85,422 (41.32%)	

^{*} : Bihar was reduced slightly by the transfer of minor territories to West Bengal in 1956 under States Reorganisation Act, 1956.

=== Bombay^{*} ===
Summary of results of the 1957 Bombay Legislative Assembly election
Political party	Flag	Seats Contested	Won	Net change in seats	Votes	Vote %	Change in vote %
Indian National Congress 234 / 396 (59%)		396	234	▼36	81,31,604	48.66%	▼1.29%
Praja Socialist Party 36 / 396 (9%)		98	36	▲27 (from SP)	14,98,700	8.97%	▼2.99% (from SP)
Peasants and Workers Party of India 31 / 396 (8%)		55	31	▲17	11,13,436	6.66%	▲0.21%
Scheduled Castes Federation 13 / 396 (3%)		48	13	▲12	10,41,355	6.23%	▲3.13%
Communist Party of India 13 / 396 (3%)		32	13	▲12	6,07,383	3.63%	▲2.19%
Bharatiya Jana Sangh 4 / 396 (1%)		23	4	▲4	2,60,826	1.56%	▲1.52%
Akhil Bharatiya Hindu Mahasabha 1 / 396 (0.3%)		10	1	▲1	71,514	0.43%	▲0.11%
Akhil Bharatiya Ram Rajya Parishad		10	0	Steady	14,794	0.09%	▼1.03%
Independent 64 / 396 (16%)		400	64	▲45	39,72,548	23.77%	▲7.53%
Total		1072	396	▲81	Turnout (Voters) 1,67,12,160 (3,14,40,079)	53.16%	▲2.38%

^{*}: On 1 November 1956, under States Reorganisation Act, 1956, Bombay state was re-organized by the addition of Saurashtra State and Kutch State, Nagpur Division of Madhya Pradesh, and Marathwada region of Hyderabad. The state's southernmost districts of Bombay were transferred to Mysore State while Abu Road taluk of the Banaskantha district was transferred to Rajasthan.

=== Kerala^{*} ===
Summary of results of the 1957 Kerala Legislative Assembly election
Party	Flag	Seats Contested	Won	% of Seats	Votes	Vote %	Vote % in contested seats
Communist Party of India		101	60	47.62	2,059,547	35.28	40.57
Indian National Congress	INC Flag Official	124	43	34.13	2,209,251	37.85	38.1
Praja Socialist Party		65	9	7.14	628,261	10.76	17.48
Revolutionary Socialist Party		28	0		188,553	3.23	11.12
Independent politician		86	14	11.11	751,965	12.88	N/A
	Total seats	126	Voters	89,13,247	Turnout	58,37,577 (65.49%)	

^{*} : In 1956, under States Reorganisation Act, 1956, Kerala was formed by the merger of Travancore-Cochin state with the Malabar district of Madras State, Kasaragod taluk of the South Canara district and the Amindive Islands. The southern part of Travancore-Cochin, Kanyakumari district was transferred to Madras State.

=== Madhya Pradesh^{*} ===
Summary of results of the 1957 Madhya Pradesh Legislative Assembly election
Political party	Flag	Seats Contested	Won	Net change in seats	% of Seats	Votes	Vote %	Change in vote %
Indian National Congress		288	232	▲38	80.56	36,91,999	49.83	▲0.76
Praja Socialist Party		163	12	New	4.16	9,76,021	13.17	New
Bharatiya Jana Sangh		133	10	▲10	3.47	7,33,315	9.90	▲6.32
Akhil Bharatiya Ram Rajya Parishad		53	5	▲2	1.75	2,29,010	3.09	▲0.58
Akhil Bharatiya Hindu Mahasabha		48	7	▲7	2.43	3,45,122	4.66	▲4.56
Communist Party of India		25	2	▲2	0.69	1,20,549	1.63	▲4.66
Independent		372	20	▼3	6.94	12,22,003	16.49	N/A
		Total Seats	288 (▲56)	Voters	1,99,31,685	Turnout	74,08,768 (37.17%)	

^{*} : On 1 November 1956, under States Reorganisation Act, 1956, Madhya Bharat (except the Sunel enclave of the Mandsaur district), Vindhya Pradesh, Bhopal state and the Sironj sub-division of the Kota district of Rajasthan were merged into Madhya Pradesh while the Nagpur Division was transferred to Bombay State.

=== Madras^{*} ===
Summary of results of the 1957 Madras Legislative Assembly election
Political party	Flag	Seats Contested	Won	% of Seats	Votes	Vote %	Change in vote %
Indian National Congress	INC Flag Official	204	151 (▼1)	73.66	50,46,576	45.34	▲10.46
Communist Party of India		58	4 (▼58)	1.95	8,23,582	7.40	▼5.78
Praja Socialist Party		23	2 (New)	0.98	2,93,778	2.64	New
Independent		602	48 (▼14)	23.41	49,67,060	44.62	N/A
		Total Seats	205 (▼170)	Voters	2,39,05,575	Turnout	1,11,30,996 (46.56%)

^{*} : On 1 November 1956, the southern part of Travancore-Cochin (Kanyakumari district) was added to the Madras State while the Malabar district of the state was transferred to the new state of Kerala, and a new union territory, Laccadive, Minicoy and Amindivi Islands, was created.

=== Mysore^{*} ===
Summary of results of the 1957 Mysore Legislative Assembly election
Political party	Flag	Seats Contested	Won	Net change in seats	% of Seats	Votes	Vote %	Change in vote %
Indian National Congress		207	150	▲76	72.12	33,43,839	52.08	▲5.73
Praja Socialist Party		79	18	New	8.65	9,02,373	14.06	New
Communist Party of India		20	1	0	0.48	1,23,403	1.92	▲1.01
Scheduled Caste Federation		6	2	0	0.96	83,542	1.30	▼0.44
Peasants and Workers Party of India		2	2	New	0.96	35,462	0.55	New
Independent		251	35	▲11	16.83	18,45,456	28.74	N/A
		Total Seats	208 (▲109)	Voters	1,25,15,312	Turnout	64,20,159 (51.3%)	

^{*} : On 1 November 1956, Mysore state was enlarged by the addition of Coorg State, the Kollegal taluk of the Coimbatore district and the South Kanara district (except the Kasaragod taluk) of Madras State, and the Kannada speaking districts from southern Bombay state and western Hyderabad State under States Reorganisation Act, 1956. The Siruguppa taluk, the Bellary taluk, the Hospet taluk and a small area of the Mallapuram sub-taluk were detached from the Mysore State.

=== Odisha ===
Source: Election Commission of India
Party				Popular vote			Seats		
Color	Flag	Name	Symbol	Votes	%	±pp	Contested	Won	+/−
		Indian National Congress		1,628,180	38.26%	▲0.39	140	56	▼11
		Ganatantra Parishad		1,223,014	28.74%	▲8.24	109	51	▲20
		Praja Socialist Party		322,305	10.99%	▼1.24	46	11	▲1
		Communist Party of India		357,659	8.40%	▲2.78	43	9	▲2
	-	Independents	-	604,652	14.21%	▼8.73	171	8	▼16
Total				-	-	-	-	140	-
Valid Votes				4,256,013	34.14				
Invalid Votes				145,456	-				
Total Votes polled / turnout				4,401,469	35.30				
Abstentation				8,066,331					
Total No. of Votes (Note: 1 X single member electors + 2 X double member electors)				12,467,800					
Total No. of Electors (Note: single member electors + double member electors)				7,983,975					

=== Punjab^{*} ===
Summary of results of the 1957 Punjab Legislative Assembly election
Political Party	Flag	Seats Contested	Won	Net Change in seats	% of Seats	Votes	Vote %	Change in vote %
Indian National Congress		154	120	▲24	77.92	36,12,709	47.51	▲10.82
Communist Party of India		72	6	▲2	3.90	10,30,898	13.56	▲9.67
Bharatiya Jana Sangh		72	9	▲9	5.84	6,54,395	8.61	▲3.05
Scheduled Caste Federation		24	5	▲5	3.25	4,10,364	5.40	▲3.43
Praja Socialist Party		19	1	New	0.65	94,564	1.24	New
Independent		319	13	▲4	8.44	18,00,960	23.69	N/A
		Total Seats	154 (▲28)	Voters	1,31,72,945	Turnout	76,03,890 (57.72%)	

^{*} : Punjab was enlarged by the addition of Patiala & East Punjab States Union in 1956 under States Reorganisation Act, 1956.

=== Rajasthan^{*} ===
Summary of results of the 1957 Rajasthan Legislative Assembly election
Party	Flag	Seats Contested	Won	Net Change in seats	% of Seats	Votes	Vote %	Change in vote %
Indian National Congress		176	119	▲37	67.61	21,41,931	45.13	▲5.67
Akhil Bharatiya Ram Rajya Parishad		60	17	▼7	9.66	4,69,540	9.89	▼2.37
Bharatiya Jana Sangh		51	6	▼2	3.41	2,63,443	5.55	▼0.38
Praja Socialist Party		27	1	New	0.57	1,17,532	2.48	New
Communist Party of India		24	1	▲1	0.57	1,43,547	3.02	▲2.49
Independent		399	32	▼3	18.18	16,10,465	33.93	N/A
		Total Seats	176 (▲16)	Voters	1,24,37,064	Turnout	47,46,458 (38.16%)	

^{*} : On 1 November 1956, under States Reorganisation Act, 1956, the Ajmer State, the Abu Road taluk of the Banaskantha district of Bombay State, the Sunel enclave of the Mandsaur district and the Lohara sub-tehsil of the Hissar district of the Punjab was merged with Rajasthan while the Sironj sub-division of the Kota district of Rajasthan was transferred to Madhya Pradesh.

=== Uttar Pradesh ===
Party	Votes	%	+/–	Seats	+/–
Indian National Congress	9,298,382	42.42	▼5.51%	286	▼102
Praja Socialist Party	3,170,865	14.47	▼3.26%	44	▲23
Bharatiya Jana Sangh	2,157,881	9.84	▲3.39%	17	▲15
Communist Party of India	840,348	3.83	▲3.49%	9	▲8
Akhil Bharatiya Ram Rajya Parishad	165,671	0.76	▼0.98%	0	▼1
Independents	6,285,457	28.68	▲9.02%	74	▲59
Total	21,918,604	100.00	–	430	Steady

=== West Bengal^{*} ===
Summary of results of the 1957 West Bengal Legislative Assembly election
Party	No. of candidates	No. of elected	No. of votes	%
Indian National Congress	251	152	4,830,992	46.14%
Communist Party of India	103	46	1,865,106	17.81%
Praja Socialist Party	67	21	1,031,392	9.85%
Forward Bloc	26	8	425,318	4.06%
Akhil Bharatiya Hindu Mahasabha	37	0	225,126	2.15%
Bharatiya Jana Sangh	33	0	102,477	0.98%
Independents	418	25	1,989,392	19.00%
Total:	935	252	10,469,803	

^{*} : West Bengal was enlarged by the addition of minor territories from Bihar in 1956 under States Reorganisation Act, 1956.

== See also ==
- 1951–52 elections in India
- 1954 elections in India
- 1955 elections in India
