= 1952 Uttar Pradesh Legislative Assembly election =

- March 26, 1952

430 seats in the Uttar Pradesh Legislative Assembly 216 seats needed for a majority
- Turnout: 38.01%
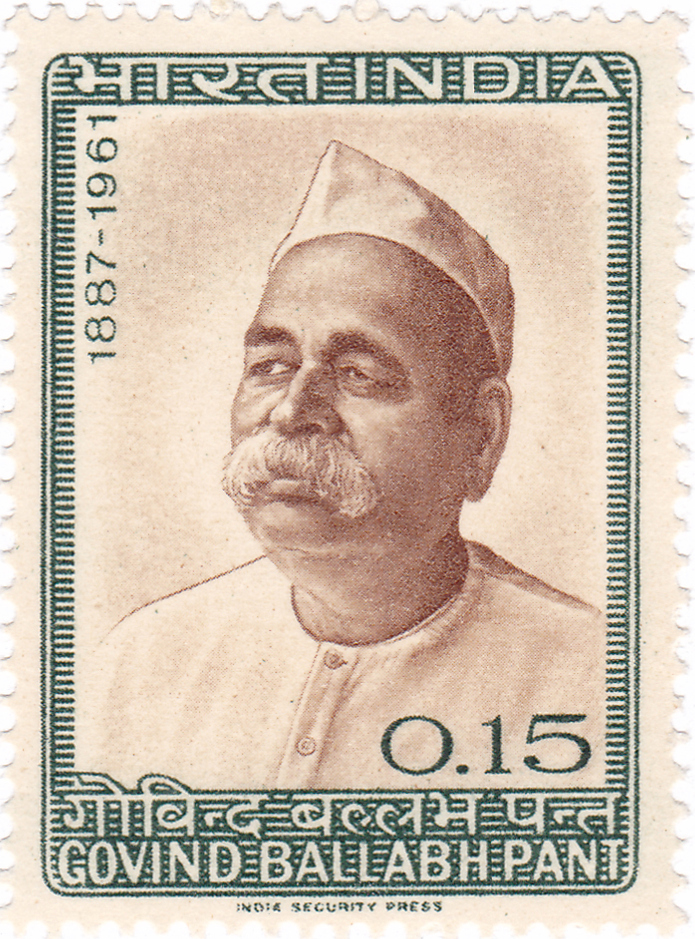
	First party	Second party
Leader	Govind Ballabh Pant
Party	INC	Socialist Party (India)
Leader's seat	Bareilly Municipality
Seats won	388	20
Popular vote	8,032,475	2,015,320
Percentage	47.93%	12.03%
Chief Minister before election
Govind Ballabh Pant
INC
Chief Minister
Govind Ballabh Pant
INC

Indian administrative divisions, as of 1951

Elections to the Uttar Pradesh Legislative Assembly were held on 26 March 1952. 2,604 candidates contested for the 347 constituencies in the Assembly. The Indian National Congress won the majority of seats and its leader Govind Ballabh Pant was re-elected as the Chief Minister.

After the passing of The Delimitation of Parliamentary and Assembly Constituencies Order, 1951, the constituencies were set to the ones used in this election. There were 83 two-member constituencies and 264 single-member constituencies.

== Results ==
Party	Votes	%	Seats
Indian National Congress	8,032,475	47.93	388
Socialist Party	2,015,320	12.03	20
Bharatiya Jana Sangh	1,081,395	6.45	2
Kisan Mazdoor Praja Party	955,708	5.70	1
Uttar Pradesh Praja Party	301,322	1.80	1
Akhil Bharatiya Ram Rajya Parishad	291,247	1.74	1
Hindu Mahasabha	239,110	1.43	1
Uttar Pradesh Revolutionary Socialist Party	57,284	0.34	1
Others (6 parties)	490,258	2.93	0
Independents	3,294,500	19.66	15
Total	16,758,619	100.00	430

== Elected members ==
Constituency	Reserved for (SC/None)	Member	Party
Chakrata Cum Western Doon (north)	None	Shanti Prapan Sharma	Indian National Congress
Western Doon South Cum Eastern Doon	None	Nar Dev Shastri	Indian National Congress
Rawain Cum Tehri North	None	Jayandra Singh Bist	Independent
Deopryag	None	Satya Singh	Independent
Tehri (south) Cum Pratap Nagar	None	Maharaj Kumar Balendu Shah	Independent
Chamol West Cum Pauri North	SC	Gangadhar Maithani	Socialist Party
Pauri South Cum Chamoli (east)	None	Chandra Singh Rawat	Indian National Congress
Pauri South Cum Chamoli (east)	None	Baldeo Singh Arya	Indian National Congress
Lansdowne (east)	None	Ram Prasad	Indian National Congress
Lansdowne (west)	None	Jagmohan Singh	Indian National Congress
Pithoragarh Cum Champawat	None	Khushi Ram	Indian National Congress
Pithoragarh Cum Champawat	None	Narendra Singh Bisht	Indian National Congress
Ranikhet (north)	None	Madan Mohan	Socialist Party
Ranikhet(south)	None	Har Govind	Indian National Congress
Almora (north)	None	Bhupal Singh	Indian National Congress
Almora(south)	None	Govardhan	Indian National Congress
Naini Tal (north)	None	N.D. Tiwari	Socialist Party
Naini Tal(south)	None	Lakshman Datt	Indian National Congress
Baheri (north East)	None	Ram Murti	Indian National Congress
Baheri(south West) Cum Bareilly (west)	None	Dharam Dutt	Indian National Congress
Bareilly Municipality	None	Pant Pandit Govind Ballabh	Indian National Congress
Bareilly (eest)	None	Safia Abdul Wajjid	Indian National Congress
Bareilly West	None	Ram Charan Lal	Indian National Congress
Aonla (west)	None	Nawal Kishore	Indian National Congress
Aonia (east) Cum Faridpur	None	Sunder Lal	Indian National Congress
Aonia (east) Cum Faridpur	None	Nathoo Singh	Indian National Congress
Nawabganj	None	Nawrang Lal	Indian National Congress
Pilibhit (west)	None	Maqsood Alam Khan	Indian National Congress
Pilibhit (east) Cum Bisalpur (west)	None	Niranjan Singh	Indian National Congress
Puranpur Cum Bisalpur (east)	None	Munindra Pal Singh	Socialist Party
Bisalpur (central)	None	Hari Prasad	Socialist Party
Thakurdwara	None	Shiv Sarup Singh	Indian National Congress
Amroha (east)	None	Khiali Ram	Indian National Congress
Amroha (west)	None	Mohd. Taqi Hadi	Indian National Congress
Hasanpur North	None	Latafat Husain	Indian National Congress
Hasanpur South Cum Sambhal West	None	Jagdish Parshad	Indian National Congress
Sambhal East	None	Lekhraj Singh	Indian National Congress
Sambhal East	None	Jagdish Saran Rastogi	Indian National Congress
Moradabad South	None	Kedar Nath	Indian National Congress
Moradabad North	None	Dau Dayal Khanna	Indian National Congress
Bilari	None	Har Sahai	Indian National Congress
Bilari	None	Mehi Lal	Indian National Congress
Rampur City	None	Fazal- Ul- Haq	Indian National Congress
Huzur Cum Milak North	None	Kalyan Rai	Indian National Congress
Milak South Cum Shahbad	None	Kishan Saran Arya	Indian National Congress
Suar Cum Tanda Cum Blaspur Mahmood Ali Khan	None	Inc	Indian National Congress
Najibabad North Cum Nagina North	None	Ratan Lal	Indian National Congress
Bijnor North Cum Najibabad West	None	Abdul Lateef	Indian National Congress
Bijnor Central	None	Chandrawati	Indian National Congress
Bijnor South Cum Dhampur South West	None	S.k. Sharma	Indian National Congress
Dhampur North East Cum Nagina East	None	Khub Singh	Indian National Congress
Dhampur North East Cum Nagina East	None	Girdhari Lal	Indian National Congress
Nagina South West Cum Dhampur North West	None	H. M. Ibrahim	Indian National Congress
Roorkee East	None	Din Dayal	Indian National Congress
Roorkee South	None	Khwaja Athar Hassan	Indian National Congress
Roorkee West Cum Saharanpur North	None	Shugan Chand	Indian National Congress
Roorkee West Cum Saharanpur North	None	Jai Pal	Indian National Congress
Saharanpur City	None	Maulvi Manzoorul Nabi	Indian National Congress
Deoband	None	Hardeva	Indian National Congress
Deoband	None	Thakur Phool Singh	Indian National Congress
Saharanpur North West Cum Nakur North	SC	Mahmood Ali Khan	Indian National Congress
Nakur South	None	Dsata Ram	Indian National Congress
Muzaffarnagar East Cum Jansath North	None	Balwant Singh	Indian National Congress
Muzaffarnagar West	None	Rajindra Datt	Indian National Congress
Kairana North	None	Kesho Gupta	Indian National Congress
Muzaffarnagar Central	None	Dwaraka Prasad	Indian National Congress
Kairana South	None	Virendra Verma	Indian National Congress
Budhana West	None	Shri Chand	Indian National Congress
Budhana East Cum Jansath South	None	Mohammad Nabi	Indian National Congress
Budhana East Cum Jansath South	None	Ram Dass	Indian National Congress
Baraut	None	Pt. Umrao Dutt Sharma (Umrao Dutt Ved)	Independent politician
Baghpat West	None	Charan Singh	Indian National Congress
Baghpat East	None	Acharya Dipanker	Independent politician
Sardhana East	None	Bishamber Singh	Indian National Congress
Sardhana West	None	Fateh Singh Rana	Indian National Congress
Ghaziabad North East	None	Vichitra Narain	Indian National Congress
Ghaziabad North West	None	Teja Singh	Indian National Congress
Ghaziabad South	None	Balbir Singh	Indian National Congress
Hapur South	None	Vir Sen	Indian National Congress
Hapur South	None	Lutf Ali Khan	Indian National Congress
Meerut Municipality	None	Kailash Prakash	Indian National Congress
Hapur North	None	Hari Singh	Indian National Congress
Hapur North	None	Prakashvati Suda	Indian National Congress
Mawana	None	Vishnu Saran Dublish	Indian National Congress
Mawana	None	Ramji Lal Sahayak	Indian National Congress
Sikandrabad West	None	Ram Chandra	Indian National Congress
Sikandrabad East	None	Kewal Singh	Indian National Congress
Khurja	None	Bhim Sen Inc	Indian National Congress
Bulandshahr North West	None	Irtiza Hussain	Indian National Congress
Bulandshahr Central	None	Banarsi Das	Indian National Congress
Bulandshahr North East	None	Mohan Singh	Indian National Congress
Anupshahr North	None	Din Dayal	Indian National Congress
Bulandshahr South Cum Anupshahr South	None	Dharam Singh	Indian National Congress
Bulandshahr South Cum Anupshahr South	None	Deo Datta	Indian National Congress
Hathras	None	Nand Kumar Deo Vashist	Indian National Congress
Hathras	None	Har Dayal Singh	Indian National Congress
Iglas	None	Sheodan Singh	Indian National Congress
Khair Cum Koil North West	None	Ram Prasad Deshmukh	Indian National Congress
Khair Cum Koil North West	None	Mohan Lal Gautam	Indian National Congress
Koil Central	None	Nafisul Hasan	Indian National Congress
Atrauli North	None	Shri Niwas	Indian National Congress
Atrauli South Cum Koil East	None	Raja Ram	Indian National Congress
Sikandra Rao North Cum Koil South East	None	Natrapal Singh	Indian National Congress
Sikandra Rao South	None	Nek Ram Sharma	Indian National Congress
Kiraoli	None	Ramesh Verma	Indian National Congress
Kheragarh	None	Jagan Prasad Rawat	Indian National Congress
Agra City North	None	Baboo Lal Mital	Indian National Congress
Agra City West	None	C.v. Mahajan	Indian National Congress
Agra	None	Deoki Nandan	Indian National Congress
Etmadpur Cum Agra East	None	Puttu Lal	Indian National Congress
Etmadpur Cum Agra East	None	Ulfat Singh Chauhan	Indian National Congress
Firozabad Cum Fatehabad	None	Ganga Dhar	Indian National Congress
Firozabad Cum Fatehabad	None	Israr-ul-haq	Indian National Congress
Bah	None	Shimbhu Nath	Indian National Congress
Mat Cum Sadabad West	None	Dal Chand	Indian National Congress
Mat Cum Sadabad West	None	Laxmi Raman Acharya	Indian National Congress
Chhata	None	Ram Het	Indian National Congress
Mathura South	None	Acharya Jugal Kishore	Indian National Congress
Mathrua North	None	Shri Nath	Indian National Congress
Sadabad East	None	Ashraf Ali	Indian National Congress
Jalesar Cum Etah North	None	Fateh Singh	Indian National Congress
Jalesar Cum Etah North	None	Chironji Lal	Indian National Congress
Etah South	None	Hoti Lal Das	Indian National Congress
Etah East Cum Aliganj West Cum Kasganj South	None	Vidya Wati	Indian National Congress
Kasganj West	None	Babu Ram Gupta	Indian National Congress
Kesganj North	None	Tirmal Singh	Indian National Congress
Kasganj East Cum Aliganj North	None	Said Jehan Beg Mukhfi	Indian National Congress
Aliganj South	SC	Mohan Singh	Independent
Badaun South West	None	Tulsi Ram	Indian National Congress
Gunnaur North	None	Karan Singh	Indian National Congress
Bisauli Cum Gunnaur East	None	Sheo Raj Singh	Indian National Congress
Bisauli Cum Gunnaur East	None	Chunni Lal	Indian National Congress
Budaun North	None	Nihal Uddin	Socialist Party
Datatganj South Cum Budaun South East	None	Nirotam	Indian National Congress
Detaganj North	None	Omkar Singh	Bharatiya Jana Sangh
Sahaswan West	None	Mir Khurshed Ali	Independent
Sahaswan East	None	Keshon Ram	Indian National Congress
Mainpuri North Cum Bhongaon North	None	Ganesh Chandra	Indian National Congress
Karhal East Cum Bhongaon South	None	Mizaji Lal	Indian National Congress
Karhal East Cum Bhongaon South	None	Sheo Baksh Singh	Indian National Congress
Mainpuri South	None	Virendra Pati	Indian National Congress
Jasrana	None	Vishan Dayal	Independent
Shikohabad West	None	Maharaj Singh	Indian National Congress
Karhal West Cum Shikohabad East	None	Bansi Das Dhanger	Kisan Mazdoor Praja Party
Kannauj North	None	Kali Charan Tandon	Indian National Congress
Chibramau East Cum Farrukhabad East	None	Pati Ram	Indian National Congress
Chibramau East Cum Farrukhabad East	None	Awdesh Chandra Singh	Indian National Congress
Farrukhabad Central Cum Kaimganj East	None	Sia Ram	Indian National Congress
Kaimganj West	None	Sultan Alam Khan	Indian National Congress
Farrukhabad West Cum Chibramau	None	Mathura Prasad	Indian National Congress
Chibramau South Cum Kannauj South	None	Chiranji Lal Paliwal	Indian National Congress
Kanpur City North	None	Surya Prasad Awasthi	Indian National Congress
Kanpur City South	None	Brahma Dutt Dixit	Indian National Congress
Kanpur City East	None	Jawahar Lal Rahtagi	Indian National Congress
Kanpur City Central West	None	Basu Deo Pd. Misra	Indian National Congress
Kanpur City Central East	None	Hamid Khan	Indian National Congress
Akbarpur South	None	Ram Dularay Misra	Indian National Congress
Bilhaur Cum Akberpur	None	Brij Rani Devi	Indian National Congress
Bilhaur Cum Akberpur	None	Murli Dhar	Indian National Congress
Ghatampur Cum Bhognipur East	None	Dayal Das Bhagat	Indian National Congress
Ghatampur Cum Bhognipur East	None	Brij Behari Mehrorta	Indian National Congress
Bhognipur West Cum Derapur South	None	Ram Swarup Gupta	Indian National Congress
Kanpur Tehsil	None	Beni Singh	Indian National Congress
Derapur North	None	Sheo Ram	Indian National Congress
Auraiya Cum Eharthana South	None	Tula Ram	Indian National Congress
Auraiya Cum Eharthana South	None	Satya Narain	Indian National Congress
Biddhuna East	SC	Gajendra Singh	Socialist Party
Bidhuna West Cum Bharthana North Cum Etwah North	None	Ghasi Ram	Indian National Congress
Bidhuna West Cum Bharthana North Cum Etwah North	None	Meher Ban Singh	Indian National Congress
Etawah South	None	Dixit Gopi Nath	Indian National Congress
Garotha Cum Moth North	None	Ram Sahai	Indian National Congress
Man Cum Moth South Cum Jhansi West Cum Lilitpur Nt	None	Kadam Laxman Rao	Indian National Congress
Man Cum Moth South Cum Jhansi West Cum Lilitpur Nt	None	Gajjoo	Indian National Congress
Jhansi East	None	Atma Ram Govind Khar	Indian National Congress
Lalitpur South	None	Krishna Chandra Sharma	Indian National Congress
Mahroni	None	Ram Nath Kher	Indian National Congress
Kalpi Cum Jalaun North	None	Virendra Shah	Uttar Pradesh Praja Party
Kalpi Cum Jalaun North	None	Basante	Indian National Congress
Konch	None	Chittar Singh	Indian National Congress
Orai Cum Jalaun South	None	Chaturbhuj Sharma	Indian National Congress
Mahoba Cum Kulpahar Cum Charkhari	None	Madanpal Singh	Socialist Party
Mahoba Cum Kulpahar Cum Charkhari	None	Manni Lal	Indian National Congress
Hamirpur Cum Maudaha North	None	Surendra Datt	Indian National Congress
Maudaha South	None	Tej Pratap Singh	Independent
Rath	None	Sripat Sahai	Indian National Congress
Mau Cam Karwi Cum Baberu East	None	Jagpat Singh	Indian National Congress
Mau Cam Karwi Cum Baberu East	None	Darshan Ram	Indian National Congress
Baberu West	None	Ram Sanehi Bhartiya	Indian National Congress
Naraini	None	Shyama Charan	Indian National Congress
Banda	SC	Pahalwan Singh	Indian National Congress
Khajuha West	None	Gur Prasad	Indian National Congress
Khajuha East Cum Fateh Pur South West	None	Sheo Rai Bali Singh	Indian National Congress
Fatehpur East Cum Khanga North	None	Khan Abdul Rauf	Indian National Congress
Fatehpur South Cum Khaga South	None	Anant Swarup Singh	Indian National Congress
Fatehpur South Cum Khaga South	None	Bhagvan Din	Indian National Congress
Unnao South	None	Liladhar	Indian National Congress
Safipur Cum Unnao North	None	Habibur Rahman	Indian National Congress
Safipur Cum Unnao North	None	Mohan Lal	Indian National Congress
Purwa Central	None	Ram Adhin	Indian National Congress
Purwa South	None	Deo Dutt Misra	Indian National Congress
Purwa North Cum Hasanganj Jata Shanker	None	Inc	Indian National Congress
Purwa North Cum Hasanganj Jata Shanker	None	Sewa Ram	Indian National Congress
Dalmau South West	None	Guptar Singh	Indian National Congress
Dalmau East	None	Chandrapal	Indian National Congress
Rae Bareli Cum Dalmau North	None	Ram Shanker	Indian National Congress
Rae Bareli Cum Dalmau North	None	Ram Prasad	Indian National Congress
Maharajganj West	None	Ram Swarup Vishard	Indian National Congress
Maharajganj West	None	Rameshwar	Indian National Congress
Maharajganj East Cum Salon North	None	Wasi Naqvi	Indian National Congress
Salon South	None	Dal Bahadur Singh	Indian National Congress
Shahabad West	None	Syed Aizaz Rasool	Indian National Congress
Shahabad East Cum Hardoi North West	None	Chheda Lal	Indian National Congress
Shahabad East Cum Hardoi North West	None	Kanahiya Lal Balmiki	Indian National Congress
Hardoi East	None	Chandra Has	Indian National Congress
Hardoi East	None	Kinder Lal	Indian National Congress
Bilgram West	None	Virendra Nath	Indian National Congress
Bilgram East	None	Radha Kishan	Indian National Congress
Sandila Cum Bilgram South East	None	Laxmi Devi	Indian National Congress
Sandila Cum Bilgram South East	None	Tika Ram	Indian National Congress
Jalalabad West	None	Ram Gulam Singh	Indian National Congress
Shahjahanpur Central	None	Habib-ur-Rehman	Indian National Congress
Powayan Cum Shahjahanpur East	None	Narain Din	Indian National Congress
Powayan Cum Shahjahanpur East	None	Prem Krishan Khanna	Indian National Congress
Tilhar North	None	Sheo Kumar Misra	Indian National Congress
Tilhar South	None	Bhagwan Sahai	Indian National Congress
Nighsan Cum Lakhimpur North	None	Jaggannath Parshad	Indian National Congress
Nighsan Cum Lakhimpur North	None	Karn Singh	Indian National Congress
Lkhimpur South	None	Cheda Lal Chaudhari	Indian National Congress
Lkhimpur South	None	Banshi Dhar Misra	Indian National Congress
Mohamdi West	None	Ram Bhajan	Indian National Congress
Mohamdi East	None	Kamal Ahmed	Indian National Congress
Sitapur (east)	None	Hakim Bashir Ahmad	Indian National Congress
Sitapur North West	None	Harish Chandra Asthana	Indian National Congress
Sitapur South East	None	Krishna Chandra Gupta	Indian National Congress
Misrikh	None	Dalla Ram	Indian National Congress
Misrikh	None	Ganga Dhar Sharma	Indian National Congress
Sidhauli West	None	Baiju Ram	Indian National Congress
Sidhauli West	None	Tara Chand	Indian National Congress
Biswan Cum Sidhauli East	None	Suresh Prakash Singh	Independent
Biswan Cum Sidhauli East	None	Munnu Lal	Indian National Congress
Mohanlalganj	None	Mahabir Prasad	Indian National Congress
Lucknow Central	None	Ram Shankar Rabivasi	Indian National Congress
Lucknow Central	None	Harish Chandra Bajpai	Indian National Congress
Lucknow City West	None	Pulin Behari Bannerji	Indian National Congress
Lucknow City East	None	Chandra Bhanu Gupta	Indian National Congress
Lucknow City Central	SC	Syed Ali Zaheer	Indian National Congress
Malihabad Cum Bara Banki North West	None	Shyam Manohar Misra	Indian National Congress
Malihabad Cum Bara Banki North West	None	Tula Ram Rawat	Indian National Congress
Fatehpur North	None	Avadh Saran Alias Lalla	Socialist Party
Nawabganj North	None	Jagat Narain	Indian National Congress
Fatehpur South	SC	Bahgwati Prasad Shukla	Indian National Congress
Nawabganj South Cum Haidergarh Cum Ramsanehighat	None	Uma Shanker Misra	Indian National Congress
Nawabganj South Cum Haidergarh Cum Ramsanehighat	None	Ghanshiam Dass	Indian National Congress
Ram Sanehighat	None	Baboo Lal Kushmesh	Indian National Congress
Ram Sanehighat	None	Mahant Jagannath Bux Dass	Indian National Congress
Pratapgarh East	SC	Bhagwati Prasad Shukla	Indian National Congress
Pratapgarh North West Cum Patti North West	None	Ram Adhar	Indian National Congress
Pratapgarh North West Cum Patti North West	None	Ram Kinker	Indian National Congress
Patti South	None	Girja Raman	Indian National Congress
Patti East	None	Ram Raj	Indian National Congress
Kunda South	None	Ram Sarup	Indian National Congress
Kunda South	None	Ram Naresh Shukla	Indian National Congress
Pratapgarh West Cum Kunda North	None	Raja Ram	Indian National Congress
Sultanpur West	None	Kuer Krishna	Indian National Congress
Sultanpur East Cum Amethi East	None	Ram Bali	Indian National Congress
Amethi Central	None	Kunwer Rananjai Singh	Independent
Musafirkhana South Cum Amethi West	None	Gur Persad Singh	Indian National Congress
Musafrkhana Central	None	Savitri Devi	Indian National Congress
Kadipur	None	Shankar	Indian National Congress
Kadipur	None	Kashi Parsad	Indian National Congress
Musafirkhana North Cum Sultanpur North	None	Gulzar	Indian National Congress
Musafirkhana North Cum Sultanpur North	None	Nazim Ali	Indian National Congress
Akbarpur East	None	Ram Narain	Socialist Party
Akbarpur West	None	Jai Ram Verma	Indian National Congress
Akbarpur West	None	Ram Dass	Indian National Congress
Bikapur West	None	Ram Harsh Yadva	Indian National Congress
Bikapur East	None	Avadhesh Pratap Singh	Independent
Bikapur Central	None	Brij Basi Lal	Indian National Congress
Tanda	None	Mohammad Nasir	Indian National Congress
Tanda	None	Ram Sumer	Indian National Congress
Faizabad West	SC	Raja Ram Misra	Indian National Congress
Faizabad East	None	Madan Gopal	Indian National Congress
Faizabad East	None	Narain Dass	Indian National Congress
Kerakat Cum Jaunpur South	None	Lal Bahadur	Indian National Congress
Kerakat Cum Jaunpur South	None	Parmeshari	Indian National Congress
Jaunpur East	SC	Har Govind	Indian National Congress
Jaunpur West	None	Deep Narain Verma	Indian National Congress
Machhli Shahar North	None	Nageshwar	Indian National Congress
Machhli Shahar South	None	Mohd. Rauf Jafri	Indian National Congress
Shahganj East	None	Babu Nandan	Indian National Congress
Shahganj East	None	Lakshmi Shankar Yadav	Indian National Congress
Mariahu South	None	Ramesh Chandra	Indian National Congress
Mariahu North	None	Dwarka Parasad	Indian National Congress
Jaunpur North Cum Shahganj West	None	Bhagauti Din	Indian National Congress
Meja Cum Karchana South	None	Raghunath Prasad	Indian National Congress
Meja Cum Karchana South	None	Mangla Prasad	Indian National Congress
Karchana North Cum Chail South	None	H. N. Bahguna	Indian National Congress
Karchana North Cum Chail South	None	Jawahar Lal	Indian National Congress
Soraon North Cum Phulipur West	None	Lal Bahadur Shastri	Indian National Congress
Soraon South	None	Parmanand Sinha	Indian National Congress
Phulpur Central	None	Shiva Nath Katju	Indian National Congress
Phulpur East Cum Handia North West	None	Bhuar	Indian National Congress
Handia South	None	Mahabir Prasad Shukla	Indian National Congress
Sirathu Cum Manjhanpur	None	Sheo Kumar	Indian National Congress
Sirathu Cum Manjhanpur	None	Sukhi Ram Bhartiya	Indian National Congress
Allahabad City East	SC	Ganesh Prasad Jaiswal	Indian National Congress
Allahabad City Central	None	Bishambhar Nath Pande	Indian National Congress
Chail North	None	Muzaffar Husain	Indian National Congress
Dudhi Cum Robertsganj	None	Ram Swaroop	Indian National Congress
Dudhi Cum Robertsganj	None	Brij Bhushan	Indian National Congress
Mirzapur South	None	Ram Kishun	Indian National Congress
Mirzapur South	None	Aziz Imam	Indian National Congress
Mirzapur North	None	Amresh Chandra Pandey	Indian National Congress
Chunar North	None	Raj Kumar Sharma	Indian National Congress
Chunar South	None	Raj Narain Singh	Indian National Congress
Chakia Cum Chandauli South East	None	Tripathi Kamalapati	Indian National Congress
Chakia Cum Chandauli South East	None	Ram Lakhan	Indian National Congress
Chandauli North	None	Kamta Prasad	Indian National Congress
Chandauli Cum Ramnager South West	None	Tiwari Umashanker	Indian National Congress
Banaras City North	None	Shaikh Mohd. Abdul Samad	Indian National Congress
Banaras City South	None	Sampurnanand Ji	Indian National Congress
Banaras North	None	Singh Lal Bahadur	Indian National Congress
Banaras Central	None	Baldev	Indian National Congress
Banaras South	None	Raj Narain	Socialist Party
Banaras West	None	Sharma Deomurti	Indian National Congress
Gyanpur East	None	Gupta B. Bechan Ram	Indian National Congress
Gyanpur North West	None	Bans Narain	Indian National Congress
Gyanpur North West	None	Bechan Ram	Indian National Congress
Bahraich East	None	Sheo Saran Lal Srivastava	Indian National Congress
Bahraich East	None	Raj Kishore	Indian National Congress
Bahraich West	None	Triloki Nath Kaul	Indian National Congress
Bahraich West	None	Jamuna Prasad	Indian National Congress
Nanpara East	None	Newazish Khan	Independent
Nanpara North	None	Basant Lal Sharma	Indian National Congress
Nanpara South	None	Syed Mohammad Saadat Ali Khan	Independent
Kaisarganj North	None	Bhagwan Din	Indian National Congress
Kaisarganj Central	None	Sia Ram	Indian National Congress
Kaisarganj South	None	Hukum Singh	Indian National Congress
Utraula South West	None	Raja Raghuvendra Pratap Singh	Indian National Congress
Utraula Central	None	S. M. Shahid Faqri	Indian National Congress
Utraula North	None	Balbhadra Prasad	Indian National Congress
Utraula North	None	Shyam Lal	Indian National Congress
Utraula North East	None	Ummed Singh	Bharatiya Jana Sangh
Gonda West	None	Jwala Prasad	Hindu Mahasabha
Gonda East	None	Mahnot Sajjan Devi	Indian National Congress
Tarabganj South East Cum Gonda South	None	Chandra Bhan Saran Singh	Indian National Congress
Tarabganj South East Cum Gonda South	None	Ganga Pd.	Indian National Congress
Tarabganj West	None	Raghuraj Singh	Indian National Congress
Utraula South	None	Amrit Nath	Indian National Congress
Domariaganj (north-west)	None	Ram Lakhan Misra	Indian National Congress
Domria Ganj North East Cum Bansi West	None	Mohd. Suleman Adhami	Indian National Congress
Bansi South	None	Ram Kumar Shastri	Indian National Congress
Bansi North	None	Puddan	Indian National Congress
Bansi North	None	Mathura Prasad	Indian National Congress
Basti East	SC	Ansman Singh	Indian National Congress
Basti West	None	Prabhudayal Vidyarthi	Indian National Congress
Basti West	None	Ram Lal	Indian National Congress
Domariaganj West	None	Sardar Sheo Mangal Singh Kapoor	Indian National Congress
Domariaganj South	None	Qazi Mohd. Adil Abbasi	Indian National Congress
Harraiya North West	SC	Prabhakar	Indian National Congress
Harraiya South West	None	Sita Ram	Indian National Congress
Harraiya East Cum Basti West	None	Sheo Narain	Indian National Congress
Harraiya East Cum Basti West	None	Kripa Shanker	Indian National Congress
Khalilabad South	None	Ram Sunder	Indian National Congress
Khalilabad South	None	Dhanush Dhari Pandey	Indian National Congress
Khalilabad Central	None	Mohd. Abdul Moiz Khan	Indian National Congress
Khalilabad North	None	Raja Ram Sharma	Indian National Congress
Bansgaon South West	None	Jasoda Devi	Indian National Congress
Bansgaon South West	None	Ganesh Prasad	Indian National Congress
Bansgaon South East	SC	Bhrigunath	Indian National Congress
Bansgaon Central	None	Kesh Bhan	Indian National Congress
Gorakhpur Central	None	Istafa Hussain	Indian National Congress
Gorakhpur North East	None	Mahadeo	Indian National Congress
Gorakhpur North East	None	Kesho	Indian National Congress
Gorakhpur South East	None	Achaibar Singh	Indian National Congress
Pharenda South	None	Dwarika Pd. Pandey	Indian National Congress
Gorakhpur West	None	Devendra Pratap Narain Singh	Indian National Congress
Pharenda Central	None	Gauri Ram	Indian National Congress
Pharenda North	None	Ram Avadh Singh	Indian National Congress
Mahrajganj North	None	Paripurna Nand	Indian National Congress
Mahrajganj South	None	Sukhdeo	Indian National Congress
Mahrajganj South	None	Thakur Ram Pd. Singh	Indian National Congress
Deoria South	None	Ram Nath	Indian National Congress
Salempur West	None	Deo Nandan	Indian National Congress
Salempur South	None	Badri Narayan Mishra	Indian National Congress
Salempur East	None	Sachita Nand	Indian National Congress
Salempur North	None	Sheo Bachan	Indian National Congress
Deoria South West Cum Hata South West	None	Ramji Sahai	Indian National Congress
Deoria South West Cum Hata South West	None	Sita Ram	Indian National Congress
Hata North	None	Raj Deo	Indian National Congress
Hata Central	None	Surya Bali Pandey	Indian National Congress
Hata Central	None	Sheo Prasad	Indian National Congress
Deoria North East	None	M. Faruq Chisti	Indian National Congress
Padrauna South West Cum Deoria South East	None	Raj Banshi	Socialist Party
Padrauna North	None	Jagarnath Mal	Socialist Party
Padrauna East	None	Genda Singh	Socialist Party
Padrauna West	None	Ram Subhag	Socialist Party
Azamgarh District Ghosi East	None	Ram Sunder	Socialist Party
Ghosi West	None	Jharkhande Rai	Uttar Pradesh Revolutionary Socialist Party
Mohammadabad North Cum Ghosi South	None	Srinath Ram	Indian National Congress
Mohammadabad North Cum Ghosi South	None	Havib-ur-rahman	Indian National Congress
Phulpur North	None	Brij Bihari	Indian National Congress
Phulpur South	None	Ram Bachan	Indian National Congress
Phulpur South	None	Asha Lata Vyas	Indian National Congress
Lalganj South	None	Kalika Singh	Indian National Congress
Lalganj North	None	Tej Bahadur	Independent
Mohammadabad Gohna South	None	Padam Nath	Indian National Congress
Sadar Azamgarh Tahsil	None	Surju Ram	Indian National Congress
Sadar Azamgarh Tahsil	None	Shiv Ram	Indian National Congress
Sagri West	None	Uma Shankar	Socialist Party
Sagri East	None	Baldeo Alias Satya Nand	Indian National Congress
Ballia East	None	Radha Mohan Singh	Indian National Congress
Ballia Central	None	Ram Anand Pandey	Indian National Congress
Ballia North East Cum Bansdih South West	None	Thakur Jagarnath Singh	Indian National Congress
Bansdih West	None	Sheo Mangal Singh	Indian National Congress
Bansdih Central	None	Baijnath Prasad	Independent
Rasra East Cum Ballia South East	None	Mandhata	Indian National Congress
Rasra East Cum Ballia South East	None	Ram Rattan	Indian National Congress
Rasra West	None	Ganga Prasad Singh	Indian National Congress
Ghazipur Central Cum Mohammadabad North West	None	Jamuna	Socialist Party
Mohammadabad North East	None	Shiva Pujan Rai	Socialist Party
Mohammadabad South	None	Bijai Shanker Prasad	Indian National Congress
Ghazipur West	None	Bishwanath Singh Gautam	Indian National Congress
Ghazipur South East	None	Vashishtha Narain Sharma	Indian National Congress
Ghavipur South West	None	Bhola	Socialist Party
Saidpur	None	Dev Ram	Indian National Congress
Saidpur	None	Kamla Singh	Independent

== See also ==
- 1951–52 elections in India
