= Pushpaben Mehta =

Indian social worker and politician

- Pushpaben Mehta receiving the Jamnalal Bajaj Award, 1983

1st Speaker of Saurashtra Legislative Assembly
- In office 1952–1956
- Preceded by: Office Established
- Succeeded by: S. L. Silam

Member of the Saurashtra Legislative Assembly
- In office 1952–1956
- Preceded by: Office Established
- Succeeded by: Hamir Sarman Solanki
- Constituency: Veraval Town

Member of Parliament, Rajya Sabha
- In office 03 April 1966 – 02 April 1972
- Constituency: Gujarat

Personal details
- Born: 21 March 1905 Veraval, Junagadh State, British India (now Gujarat, India)
- Died: 12 April 1988 (aged 83) Amdavad, Gujarat, India
- Party: Indian National Congress; INC(O) (after 1969)
- Education: Baroda College
- Awards: Padma Bhushan (1956); Jamnalal Bajaj Award (1983)

Pushpa Janardanrai Mehta (21 March 1905 ― 2 April 1988), also known as Pushpaben Mehta, was an Indian social worker and politician from Gujarat. She founded and headed several women and child welfare organisations in Ahmedabad and Saurashtra region. She served as the member of legislative assemblies of Saurashtra, Bombay and Gujarat states consecutively from 1952 to 1962. She served as the member of Rajya Sabha from 1966 to 1972. She was awarded the Padma Bhushan in 1956.

== Early life ==
Pushpaben was born on 21 March 1905 to Harprasad Desai, an official of the Junagadh State, and Hetuba in Veraval (now in Gir Somnath district, Gujarat, India). After studying in local girls school in Veraval, she joined the experimental school of the Mahalaxmi Female Training College at Ahmedabad in 1915. Her family returned to Veraval following the plague in Ahmedabad.

She married Janardan Mehta, a teacher from Bhavnagar, in Veraval on 25 January 1920. They moved to Karachi following their marriage where Janardan could teach at B. V. S. Parsi High School. She gained a stepson from Janardan's previous marriage. Usha was their only daughter who was born in 1922. She matriculated in 1930. Her husband, Janardan, died from fever on 27 December 1931. She moved to Ahmedabad and completed a BA from Baroda. She became a teacher in the Municipal Girls School in Ahmedabad.

== Social welfare career ==
Her work was blessed by Mahatma Gandhi and participated in the Indian independence movement. Mridula Sarabhai invited her to join Jyoti Sangh, an organisation established for women and child welfare founded by Sarabhai. She became a secretary of Jyoti Sangh in November 1934. During her years at Jyoti Sangh, she rehabilitated destitute women and children. She founded the Vikas Gruh at Saurashtra Society in Ahmedabad in 1937 to shelter those women and make them self-reliant. The organisation grew with welfare, residential and commercial facilities. In 1954, the new building of Vikas Gruh was opened by Rajendra Prasad, the President of India.

She founded social organisations in the Saurashtra region including Revashankar Pancholi Pragati Gruh at Halvad in 1944, Vikas Vidyalaya at Wadhwan in 1945, Kanta Stree Vikas Gruh at Rajkot in 1945, Shishu Mangal at Junagadh in 1947-48, Mahila Vikas Mandal at Amreli in 1950, Kasturba Stree Vikas Gruh at Jamnagar in 1956, Tapibai Vikas Gruh at Bhavnagar in 1960 and Kalyan Gram-Vikas Vidyalaya at Morbi in 1979. She established three Ashram Shalas (residential schools) in tribal regions of Saurashtra. She founded the Maldhari Sangh in 1950 to address the problem of Maldhari people during the famine in Saurashtra. She was the founder and president of the Samasta Gujarat Samajik Sanstha Madhyastha Mandal, a federation of about 130 social welfare organisations in Gujarat, which was founded in 1945.

== Political career ==
Mehta was a cabinet member of the Arzi Hukumat (provisional government) which was instrumental during the annexation of Junagadh in 1947. She was a member of legislative assemblies of Saurashtra, Bombay and Gujarat states from 1952 to 1962. She was the first speaker of the Saurashtra Legislative Assembly. She served as the Chairman of the Social Welfare Boards of Saurashtra, Bombay and Gujarat states from 1954 to 1965. She served as the member of Rajya Sabha from 3 April 1966 to 2 April 1972 representing Congress (O).

She died on 2 April 1988 in Ahmedabad.

== Recognition ==
She was awarded the Jamnalal Bajaj Award for Women and Children Welfare in 1983. She was awarded the Padma Bhushan, the third highest civilian award of India, in 1956 for her contribution in public affairs.
