= Hamir Jiva Vankar =

Hamir Jiva Vankar was an Indian politician. He was elected to the Saurashtra Legislative Assembly from the Scheduled Castes reserved seat of the Limbdi Wadhwani constituency in the 1952 election, standing as the Socialist Party candidate. The constituency was not a socialist stronghold, the socialist candidate for the unreserved seat of the same constituency finished in fourth place with 8.96% of the votes. Vankar was elected unopposed, as the nomination papers of the Indian National Congress candidate had been rejected. Vankar's election was challenged in a petition to the Election Commission of India from the Congress candidate Madhavi Meghjibhai Manabhai, who claimed his candidature had been 'improperly rejected'.
