= Kundanika Kapadia =

Indian novelist (1927–2020)

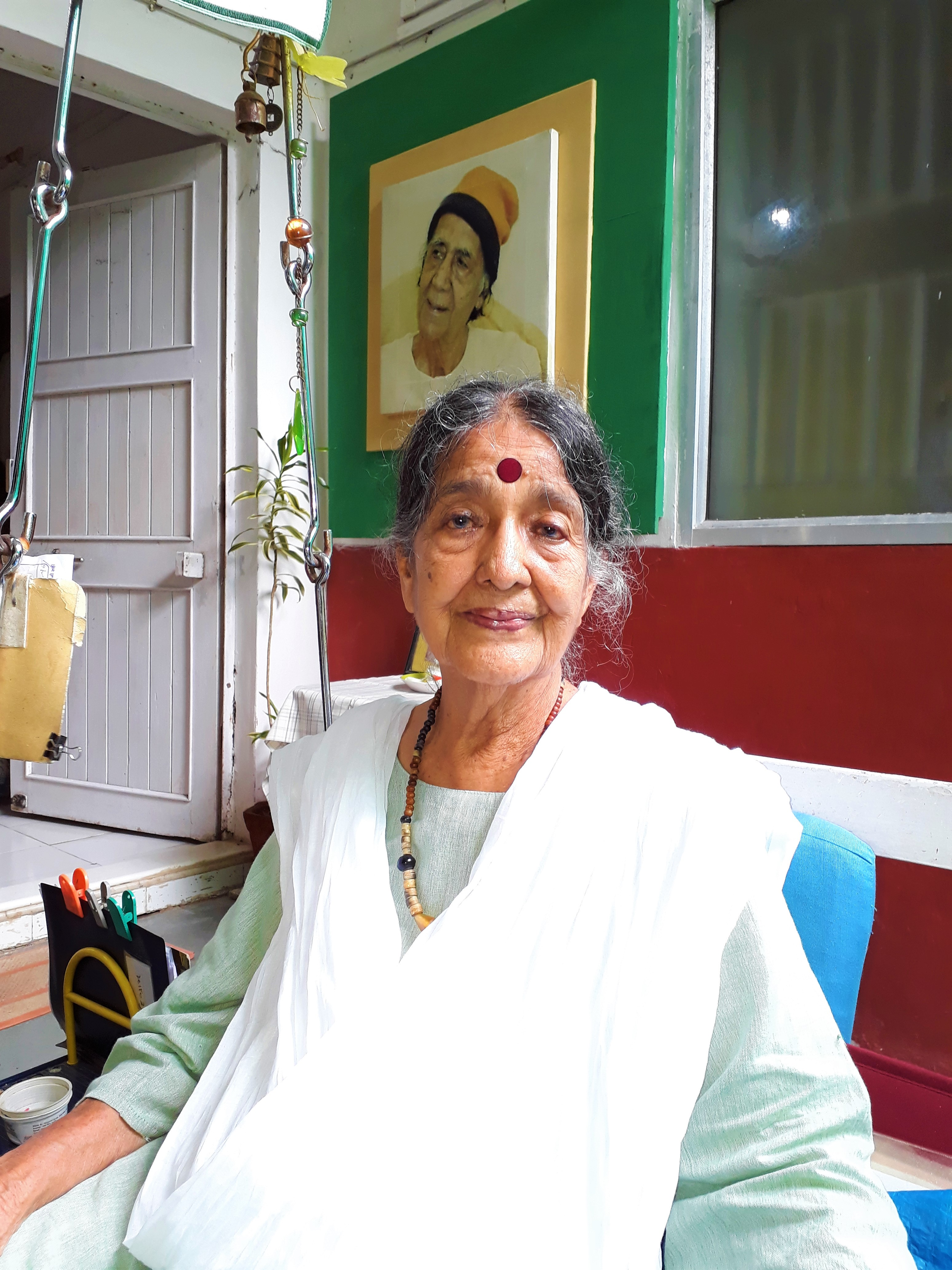
- Kapadia at Nandigram Ashram, July 2018
- Born: 11 January 1927; Limbdi, Wadhwan State, British India
- Died: 30 April 2020 (aged 93); Valsad, Gujarat, India
- Occupations: novelist, story writer, essayist
- Spouse: Makarand Dave (m. 1968; died 2005)
- Writing career
- Language: Gujarati
- Notable awards: Sahitya Akademi Award (1985)

Kundanika Kapadia (11 January 1927 – 30 April 2020) was an Indian novelist, story writer and essayist from Gujarat.

== Biography ==
Kundanika Kapadia was born on 11 January 1927 in Limbdi (now in Surendranagar district, Gujarat) to Narottamdas Kapadia. She completed her primary and secondary education in Godhra. She participated in the nationalist Quit India Movement in 1942. In 1948, she completed a BA in history and politics from Samaldas College, Bhavnagar, affiliated with University of Bombay. She pursued an MA in entire politics from Mumbai School of Economics but could not appear in examinations. She married the Gujarati poet Makarand Dave in Mumbai in 1968. They did not have any children together. She co-founded Nandigram, an ashram near Vankal village near Valsad, with him in 1985. She was known as Ishamaa by her Nandigram fellows. She edited Yatrik (1955–1957) and Navneet (1962–1980) magazines.

She died on April 30, 2020 at Nandigram near Vankal village in Valsad district, Gujarat, India, at the age of 93.

== Works ==
Snehdhan was her pen name. Her first novel was Parodh Thata Pahela (1968), followed by Aganpipasa (1972). She wrote Saat Pagala Aakashma (Seven Steps in the Sky, 1984), which won her critical acclaim and is considered her best novel which explored feminism.

Her first story was "Premna Ansu", which won her the second prize in an international story competition organised by Janmabhoomi newspaper. She started writing more stories thereafter. Premna Ansu (1954) was published as her story collection. Her other story collections are Vadhu ne Vadhu Sundar (1968), Kagalni Hodi (1978), Java Daishu Tamane (1983) and Manushya Thavu (1990). Her stories explore philosophy, music and nature. Her selected stories were published as Kundanika Kapadia ni Shreshth Vartao (1987). She was influenced by Dhumketu, Sarat Chandra Chattopadhyay, Rabindranath Tagore, Shakespeare and Ibsen.

Her essay collections are Dwar ane Deewal (1987) and Chandra Tara Vriksh Vadal (1988). Akrand ane Akrosh (1993) is her biographical work. She edited Param Samipe (1982), Zarukhe Diva (2001) and Gulal ane Gunjar. Param Samipe is her popular prayer collection.

She translated Laura Ingalls Wilder's work as Vasant Avshe (1962). She translated Mary Ellen Chase's A Goodly Fellowship as Dilbhar Maitri (1963) and the Bengali writer Rani Chand's travelogue as Purnakumbh (1977). Her other works of translation are Purusharthne Pagale (1961), Florence Scovel Shinn's The Game of Life and How to Play It as Jeevan Ek Khel (1981), Eileen Caddy's Opening the Door Within as Ughadata Dwar Anantna and Swami Rama's Living with the Himalayan Masters as Himalayana Siddha Yogi (1984).

== Awards ==
Kapadia received several prizes from the Gujarati Sahitya Parishad and the Gujarat Sahitya Akademi. Chandra Tara Vriksh Vadal won her the Gujarat Sahitya Akademi prize. She was awarded the Sahitya Akademi Award for Gujarati in 1985 for Sat Pagala Akashma. She received the Dhanji Kanji Gandhi Suvarna Chandrak in 1984.
