= Makarand Dave =

Gujarati Poet

Makarand Vajeshankar Dave
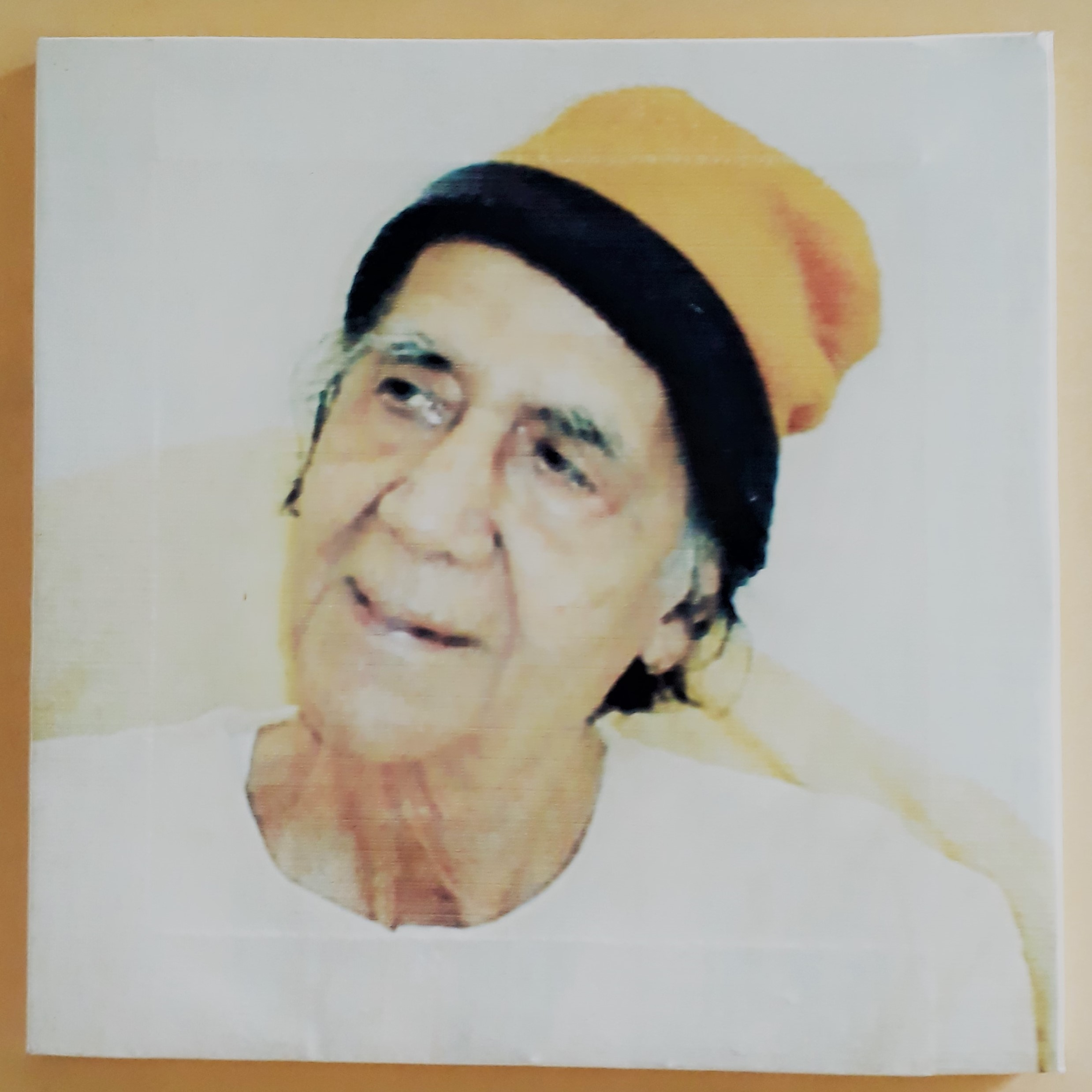
- Born: 13 November 1922; Gondal, Gondal State, British India
- Died: 31 January 2005 (aged 82); Valsad, Gujarat, India
- Other name: Sai
- Occupation: poet
- Spouse: Kundanika Kapadia (m. 1968; died 2020)
- Writing career
- Language: Gujarati
- Notable awards: Ranjitram Suvarna Chandrak 1979

Makarand Dave, also referred as Sai Makarand Dave, was a Gujarati poet and author from Gujarat, India.

== Biography ==
Dave was born in Gondal (now in Rajkot district, Gujarat) on 13 November 1922 to Vajeshankar Dave. After completing his school education in Gondal, he joined the Dharamsinhji College, Rajkot in 1940. He left studies in 1942 to participate in the Quit India movement of the Indian independence movement. In early life, he came in a contact with his spiritual teacher, Nathalal Joshi. He married an author Kundanika Kapadia in 1968. He moved to Mumbai later. He served as the editor of Kumar (1944–45), Urmi Navrachna (1946), Sangam, Parmarthi magazines and Jai Hind daily.

With his wife, he moved from Mumbai to Dharampur near Valsad in 1987 and established Nandigram, an ashram for the welfare of tribal people as well as a spiritual centre.

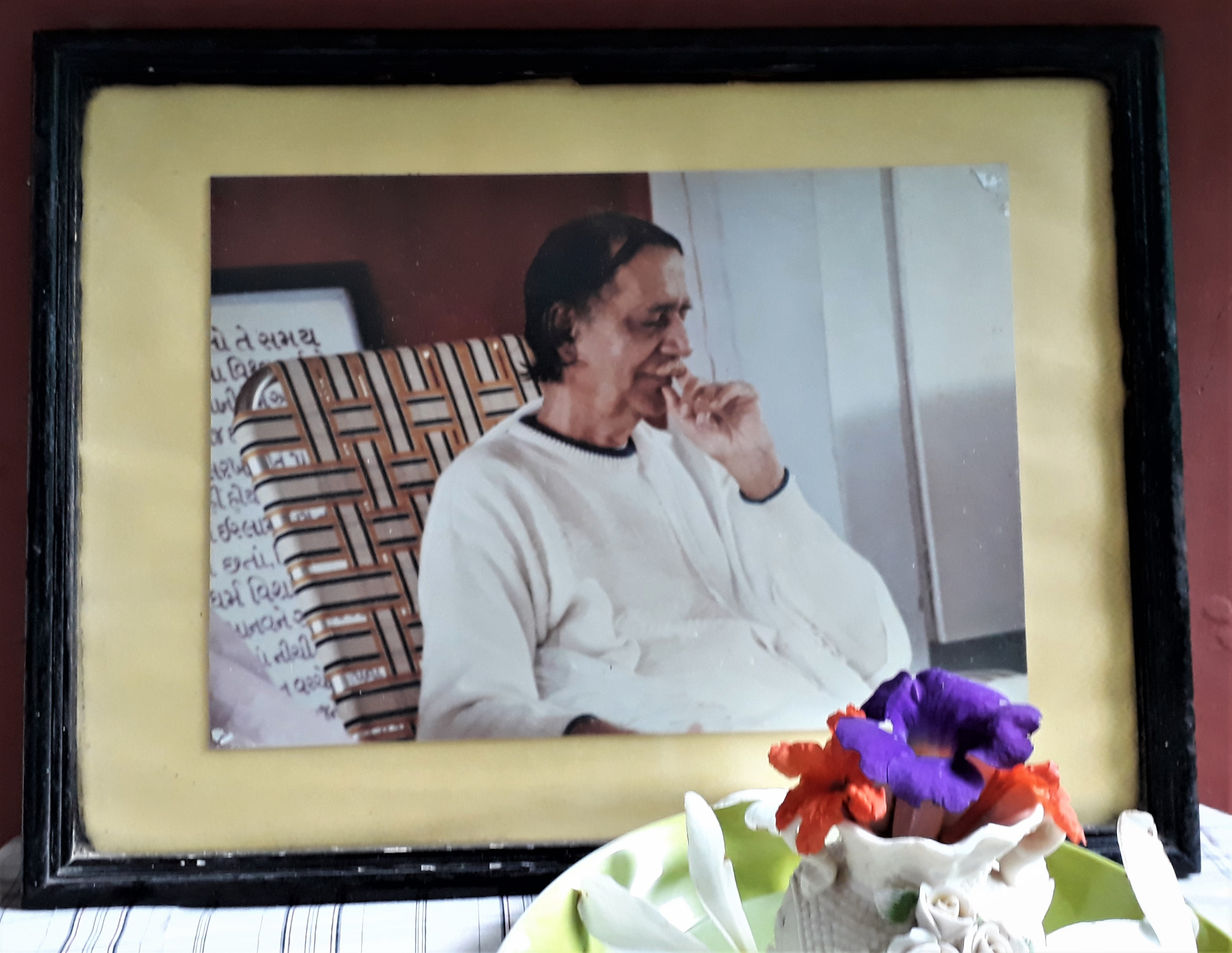
Makarand Dave's Photo placed at Nandigram Ashram

He was referred as Sai by Swami Anand.

He died on 31 January 2005 at Nandigram near Vankal village in Valsad district, Gujarat.

== Works ==
Dave wrote poetry, philosophy and on spirituality extensively.

=== Vartasangraha ===
- Gulabi Aaras Ni Laggi
- Mor Banglo
- Nagar Vase Chhe

=== Poetry ===
In Gujarati:

- Suraj Kadach Uge
- Tarana (1951)
- Jayabharee (1952)
- Goraj (1957)
- Suajmukhi (1961)
- Sangnya (1964)
- Sangati (1968)

=== Spirituality ===
In Gujarati:

- Antarvedi
- Tapovan Ni Vaate
- Peed Parayi
- Bhagavathi Sadhana
- Vishnu Sahasranam
- Bhajan Ras
- Yogi Harnath Na Sanidya
- Ram Name Tarakmantra
- Shiva Mahimna Stotra
- Aabhala
- Sahaj Ne Kinare
- Ashvamedh Yagna
- Chindanand
- Chirantana
- Dampatya Yog
- Garbhadeep
- Janam Janamni Kunchi
- Mati No Mahekto Sad
- Shree Hanumant Charne
- Garudapurana
- Suraya Ni Amantran Patrika
- Dhummas Ne Pele Paar
- Chhip no Chahero
- Savitri Vidya
- Yagna Vidya
- Laghustav

=== Spiritual poetry ===
In Gujarati

- Koi Ghatma Gaheke Gheru
- Zabuk Vizadi Zabuk
- Dampatya - Yog Ane Nava Lagna Geeto
- Hava Bari (Ghazals)
- Gulal Ane Gunjar
- Partiroop

=== Others ===
In English

- Prometheus : The Living Flame of Love
- Shiva : The Light of Lights
- Homeage to Mother Liberty
- Immortal Face of America
- Bhaktamar
- Yoga of Marriage

== Recognition ==
Dave was awarded the Ranjitram Suvarna Chandrak in 1979. He also received the Sahitya Gaurav Puraskar (1997), Narsinh Mehta Award, Aurobindo Award for philosophical and other works.

== See also ==
- Babubhai P. Vaidya
- List of Gujarati-language writers
