= Ravikumar Gowda Ganiga =

Indian politician (born 1980)

Ravikumar Gowda

Member of the Karnataka Legislative Assembly
- Incumbent
- Assumed office 2023
- Chief Minister: Siddaramaiah
- Preceded by: M. Srinivas
- Constituency: Mandya

Personal details
- Born: Puttaswamy Ravikumar; 31 December 1980 (age 45) Ganiga, Mandya district, Karnataka, India
- Party: INC
- Education: Government Pre University College, Malleshwaram, Bengaluru (PUC)
- Occupation: Politician; Businessman
- Nickname: Ravikumar Gowda Ganiga

Ravikumar Gowda Ganiga (born 1980), is an Indian politician from Karnataka. He is a member of the Karnataka Legislative Assembly from Mandya Assembly constituency in Mandya district. He represents Indian National Congress Party and won the 2023 Karnataka Legislative Assembly election.

== Early life and education ==
Gowda was born in Mandya to L. Puttaswamy. He runs his own business. He completed his pre university course from Government Pre-University College, Malleshwaram, Bangalore.

== Career ==
Gowda won the 2023 Karnataka Legislative Assembly election from Mandya Assembly constituency representing Indian National Congress. He polled 61,411 votes and defeated his nearest rival, B. R. Ramachandra of Janata Dal (S) by a narrow margin of 2,019 votes.
