= Uttar Pradesh Revolutionary Socialist Party =

- Leader: Jharkhande Rai
- Founded: 1951
- Dissolved: 30 November 1952
- Split from: Revolutionary Socialist Party
- Merged into: Communist Party of India
- Ideology: Communism
- Election symbol: Bow and arrow
- Lok Sabha: 0 / 486
- U.P. Legislative Assembly: 1 / 430

The Uttar Pradesh Revolutionary Socialist Party (abbreviated UP RSP) was a left-wing political party in Uttar Pradesh, India 1951–1952. It held one seat in the Uttar Pradesh Legislative Assembly. The party ended up merging with the Communist Party of India.

== Split in RSP ==
The party was formed after a split in the Revolutionary Socialist Party. As of 1950, under the leadership of Jharkhande Rai, the Uttar Pradesh state unit of RSP had become pro-communist. In 1951 the national leadership of RSP declared the entire Uttar Pradesh branch expelled and its State Committee dissolved. The group of Rai then set up UP RSP as a separate party. The influence of the party was limited to a few pockets.

== 1951–52 elections ==
The party contested the elections in 1951 and 1952. It was awarded 'bow and arrow' as its election symbol. During the election campaign, UP RSP worked in alliance with the Communist Party of India and the Bolshevik Party of India.

In the 1951–52 Lok Sabha election the party contested two seats; Kunwar Maharaj Singh stood as the candidate in the Bahraich District (East) constituency and Lakshmi Shanker in the Ballia District South (West) constituency. Singh obtained 7,064 votes (7.36% of the votes in the constituency) whilst Shanker got 13,601 votes (11.61%). All in all, UP RSP got 0.12% of the votes in the state (and 0.02% of the votes nationwide). The party launched nine candidates in the 1951 Uttar Pradesh Legislative Assembly election. One candidate, Jharkhande Rai, won a seat. Rai won the Ghosi West seat, with 15,524 votes (47.95%). Two UP RSP candidates finished second in their respective seats; Udal got 7,587 votes (20.50%) in Banaras West and Kapildeo Singh got 8,267 votes (24.98%) in Rasra West. All other UP RSP candidates lost their deposits. In total the UP RSP candidates got 57,284 votes (0.34% of the votes in the state). The average percentage of votes of the UP RSP candidates in the constituencies contested stood at 14.32%.

== Merger with CPI ==
UP RSP merged with the Communist Party of India in 1952. The merger was formalized at a party conference in Mau, held 28–30 November 1952. Through the merger with UP RSP, the Communist Party obtained representation in the Uttar Pradesh Legislative Assembly.
