= Saurashtra Khedut Sangh =

Farmers' movement in India

Saurashtra Khedut Sangh ('Saurashtra Farmers League') was a farmers' movement in Saurashtra, India. The organisation was founded under the leadership of Ratibhai Ukabhai, a modest social worker and an erstwhile Indian National Congress member. It had strong support amongst the Leua Patidar community.

Initially the Khedut Sangh was intended to function as a general farmers' body within the Indian National Congress framework. But the organisation failed to obtain support from the Congress leadership and developed into a separate movement. The Socialist Party leader Jaswant Mehta was amongst the supporters of the Khedut Sangh. In its initial phase the group had a more leftist outlook. It accused the Congress Party of pro-urban and pro-Girasdar (landlord) bias, that the party neglected rural and tenants' interests. The Khedut Sangh opposed the mandatory food levy on the peasantry. Once the Girasdari system of land tenancy was abolished, the Khedut Sangh moved to a more rightist outlook and the socialists deserted the organisation. The organisation entered into an electoral alliance with Samaldas Gandhi's Praja Paksha. Nevertheless, the Saurashtra Khedut Sangh maintained more leftist postures than the Gujarat Khedut Sangh (which focused more on landowners' rights than the right of tillers to the land).

In the run-up to the 1951 elections the Saurashtra Khedut Sangh was the main contender against the Congress Party in the state. It had some 42,000 paying members. But it lacked prominent leaders. The organisation presented 37 candidates in the 1951 Saurashtra Legislative Assembly election. It total the candidates of the party obtained 139,449 votes (14.66% of the votes in the state). One candidate of the party was elected, Mohanlal D. Vaghia from the Liliya constituency. The organization was the second-most voted party contesting the election. It fielded one candidate in the 1951 Lok Sabha election, Vinubhai Jagannath Bhatt in the Madhya Saurashtra seat. He obtained 29,766 votes (21.27% of the votes in the constituency).

By mid-1966 the Saurashtra Khedut Sangh had merged into the Swatantra Party.
