= Babubhai P. Vaidya =

Indian independence activist, politician, social reformer, journalist and writer

Babubhai Pranjivan Vaidya (23 July 1909 – 12 December 1979) was an Indian independence activist, politician, social reformer, journalist and writer.

== Early life ==
Babubhai P. Vaidya was born in Dwarka, Gujarat state, India, on 23 July 1909, into a family of physicians. His father was Dr. Pranjivandas M. Vaidya, who had offices in Baroda. His elder brother, Dr. Manubhai Vaidya, was a leader in the community and received the Best Teacher Award from the President of India, Dr. S. Radhakrishnan. Babubhai's two sisters, Sumati and Sushila, pioneered women's education in Western India.

Vaidya joined the Indian Independence Movement after his graduation from the University of Mumbai in Bombay, where he had studied English Literature.

== Political career ==
Vaidya was elected to Saurashtra State Legislative Assembly in 1951 from Jetpur constituency as a candidate of Indian National Congress. He was elected to Gujarat Legislative Assembly from Rajkot constituency in 1962 as an independent candidate.

== Literary career and journalism ==
He was one of the first Indian authors to translate the works of Henrik Ibsen, Oscar Wilde, Pamela Walton, and Salam Alekum into the Gujarati language. Vaidya's first major novel was Upama. Along with Zaverchand Meghani, he was co-editor of Phulchhab. Both Meghani and Vaidya set the stage for independent journalism in reaction to oppression under British rule. Vaidya became the editor of the first daily in Saurashtra; Makarand Dave was the co-editor of this daily.

Vaidya wrote two major novels, Vishwamitra and Shakuntaleya Bharat, which depicts his vision of the future of India, based on its past before British colonization. He had visited the grave of Walt Whitman, whose poetry was very dear to him.

== Activism ==
Vaidya inherited the reformist spirit from his Aryasamajist grandfather, Mayaram Sundarji Vaidya, an Ayurvedic physician. He broke away from rigid Hindu rituals and idolatry. Throughout his life he fought against oppression and injustice in the name of caste, creed, race, and wealth. His life and literature reflected his concern for human rights and dignity.

He was involved in running a hostel where boys from the untouchable caste and the higher castes lived together.

He proposed that the age-old system of health (Ayurveda) be discarded and the major new developments in biology be adopted instead. He wanted the Ayurveda University to be at the forefront of research. He stressed the need for evidence-based medical practice. This practice has been recently fulfilled by the use of Reverse Pharmacology in Ayurveda.

== Death ==
Babubhai died on 12 December 1979, in Mumbai. His 50-year anniversary was celebrated by a memorial trust in his name.

== See also ==
- List of Gujarati-language writers
