= All People's Party (Assam) =

Political party in Assam, India

The All People's Party or Sarbadal was a political party in Assam, northeast India. The party was founded in Dibrugarh by Ahom elites on 8 May 1945. It united different groups that sought to challenge the Indian National Congress (which the Ahom elites saw as a platform for caste Hindus) in elections. The All India Muslim League, the Tribal League and the Ahom Sabha took part in the founding of the party. The party sought to mobilise the Kachari, Muttock and Deuri communities, to compete against caste Hindus for political influence. To a large extent, the party represented tea garden labourers. During its initial period, the party demanded that the British colonial government should create a separate Ahom constituency (a demand that was not heeded by the government). The party cooperated with the Muslim League, being united in their opposition against the Congress party.

The headquarters of the party were based in Jorhat. Surendranath Buragohain was the founding general secretary of the party. Soon, however, he left the party. Muhammed Saadulah (leader of the Muslim League) was unanimously elected chairman of Sarbadal at its founding conference. Another founding member was P.M. Sarwan. As of 1949, Ghana Kanta Gogoi was the general secretary of the party.

Following the Independence of India, the party contested the 1952, 1957 and 1962 Assam legislative assembly elections. In each of these elections the party contested three seats. In the 1952 election, running as the 'All People's Party', the party won one seat (Titibar). In total the three candidates of the party mustered 14,930 votes (0.61% of the statewide vote). In the 1951 Lok Sabha election the party fielded one candidate, Nalini Nath Phukan in the Golaghat Jorhat constituency. She obtained 36,851 votes (21.40% of the votes in the constituency). The election symbol of the party was a pair of scales. In the 1957 it ran as 'Sarbadal', losing its presence in the assembly. In 1967 it ran as 'Sarbadal Sramik Sabha', but was unable to win any seat.
