= 1955 elections in India =

Elections in India
- 1955

The 1955 elections in India consists of several elections, to Legislative Assemblies.

== Legislative Assembly elections ==
Legislative Assembly elections in India were conducted for Andhra State Legislative Assembly in 1955. In Andhra State, Indian National Congress won an absolute majority.

=== Results by party ===
Party	Votes	%	Seats
Indian National Congress	3,394,109	39.35	119
Krishikar Lok Party	625,827	7.26	22
Communist Party of India	2,685,251	31.13	15
Praja Socialist Party	481,666	5.58	13
Praja Party	240,884	2.79	5
Bharatiya Jana Sangh	8,218	0.10	0
Independents	1,188,887	13.78	22
Total	8,624,842	100.00	196

=== Results by constitutency ===
#	Constituency	Member	Party
1	Ichapuram	Uppada Rangababu	Krishikar Lok Party
2	Sompeta	Goutu Latchanna	Krishikar Lok Party
3	Brahmanatarala	Nicharia Ramulu	Krishikar Lok Party
4	Tekkali	Rokkam Lakshmi Narasimham Dora	Indian National Congress
5	Narasannapeta	Simma Jagannadham	Krishikar Lok Party
6	Patapatnam	Pothula Gunnayya	Indian National Congress
6	Patapatnam	Lukulapu Lakshmanadas	Indian National Congress
7	Naguru	Addakula Lakshmu Naidu	Independent
8	Parvathipuram	Vyricherla Chandrachudamani Dev	Independent
9	Salur	Allu Yerukunaidu	Praja Socialist Party
9	Salur	Boina Rajayya	Indian National Congress
10	Bobbili	Kotagiri Sitharama Swamy	Indian National Congress
11	Balijipeta	Peddinti Ramaswamy Naidu	Indian National Congress
12	Vunukuru	Chelikani Sreeranga Naikulu	Krishikar Lok Party
13	Palakonda	Pydi Narasimhapparao	Independent
14	Nagarikatkam	Thammineni Papa Rao	Independent
15	Srikakulam	Pasagada Suryanarayana	Independent
16	Shermuhammadapuram	Choudari Satyanarayana	Krishikar Lok Party
17	Cheepurupalli	Modandi Satyanarayana Raju	Praja Socialist Party
17	Cheepurupalli	Kottapalli Punnayya	Krishikar Lok Party
18	Bhogapuram	Batsa Adinarayana	Praja Socialist Party
19	Gajapatinagaram	Gantlana Surayanarayana	Praja Socialist Party
19	Gajapatinagaram	Kusum Gajapathiraju	Praja Socialist Party
20	Vizianagaram	Pusapati Viziarama Gajapatiraju	Praja Socialist Party
21	Revidi	Kakarlapudi Viziaraghava Satyanarayana Padmanabha Raju	Praja Socialist Party
22	Bheemunipatnam	Gottumukkala Jagannadha Raju	Praja Socialist Party
23	Visakhapatnam	Ankitham Venkatabhanojirao	Indian National Congress
24	Kanithi	B. G. M. A. Narasingarao	Indian National Congress
25	Paravada	Eti Nagayya	Krishikar Lok Party
26	Anakapalli	Beesetti Appa Rao	Krishikar Lok Party
27	Chodavaram	Reddy Jagannadham	Independent
28	Srungavatapukota	Chaganti Venkata Somayajulu	Praja Socialist Party
28	Srungavatapukota	Gujjela Rama Naidu	Praja Socialist Party
29	Madugula	Donda Sreerama Murty	Praja Socialist Party
30	Kondakarla	Majji Pydayya Naidu	Krishikar Lok Party
31	Yellamanchili	Chintalapati Venkata Suryanarayana Raju Alias Sanyasi Raju	Independent
32	Narasapatnam	Mutyala Pothuraju	Indian National Congress
32	Narasapatnam	Raja Sagi Suryanarayana Raju	Indian National Congress
33	Golugonda	Ruthala Latchapatrudu	Independent
34	Gudem	Matcharasa Matsyaraju	Independent
35	Bhadrachalam	Syamala Seetharamaiah	Communist Party of India
35	Bhadrachalam	Mahammad Tahseel	Communist Party of India
36	Rajahmundry	Ambadipudi Balanageswararao	Praja Party
37	Burugupudi	Neerukonda Venkata Ramarao	Krishikar Lok Party
37	Burugupudi	Battina Subba Rao	Independent
38	Jaggampeta	Duriseti Gopalrao	Independent
39	Peddapuram	Durvasula Venkatasubbarao	Communist Party of India
40	Prathipadu	Parvata Gurraju	Indian National Congress
41	Tuni	Raja Vatsavaya Venkata Krishnamuraj Bahadur	Indian National Congress
42	Pithapuram	Vadrevu Gopalkrishna	Praja Party
43	Samalkot	Putsala Satyanarayana	Communist Party of India
44	Kakinada	Mallipudi Pallam Raju	Indian National Congress
45	Pallipalem	Reddy Kamayya	Indian National Congress
45	Pallipalem	Remella Tirupathirao	Indian National Congress
46	Ramchandrapuram	Kakarlapudi Sri Raja Ramachandraraju Bahadur	Praja Party
47	Anaparthi	Tetala Lakshminirayana Reddy	Praja Party
48	Pamarru	S. B. P. Pattabhiramarao	Indian National Congress
49	Cheyyeru	Nadimpalli Ramabhadraraju	Indian National Congress
50	Amalapuram	Bojja Appala Swamy	Independent
50	Amalapuram	Golkotinarasimhamurty	Independent
51	Razole	Ganji Nageswararao	Communist Party of India
51	Razole	Alluru Venkararamaraju	Communist Party of India
52	Kothapeta	Kala Venkatarao	Indian National Congress
53	Kovvur	Alluri Bapineedu	Indian National Congress
53	Kovvur	Taneti Veeraraghavulu	Indian National Congress
54	Polavaram	Pusuluri Kodanad Ramayya	Indian National Congress
55	Eluru	Seerla Brahmayya	Indian National Congress
56	Dendulur	Mulpuri Rangayya	Indian National Congress
57	Tadepalligudem	Namburi Srinivasarao	Indian National Congress
57	Tadepalligudem	Srimat Kilambi Venkata Krishnavataram	Indian National Congress
58	Pentapadu	Chintalapati Seetharama Chandra Veraprasada Murtyraju	Indian National Congress
59	Tanuku	Mullapudi Harischandraprasad	Indian National Congress
60	Atill	Chodagam Ammanna Raja	Indian National Congress
61	Penugonda	Jevvadi Laxmayya	Indian National Congress
62	Narasapur	Grandhi Venkata Reddy	Indian National Congress
63	Palacole	Desari Perumallu	Indian National Congress
63	Palacole	Addepalli Satyanarayanamurty	Indian National Congress
64	Bhimavaram	Nachu Venkatramaiah	Indian National Congress
65	Undi	Gadiraju Jagannadharaju	Indian National Congress
66	Kaikalur	Kammili Appa Rao	Indian National Congress
67	Gudivada	Vemul Kurmayya	Indian National Congress
67	Gudivada	Adusumilli Venkata Subramanyam	Independent
68	Gannavaram	Puchalapalli Sundarayya	Communist Party of India
69	Kankipadu	Chagarlamudi Ramakotaiah	Krishikar Lok Party
70	Vijyavada South	Ayyadevara Kaleswara Rao	Indian National Congress
71	Vijayavada North	Marupilla Chitti Alias Appalaswami	Indian National Congress
72	Mylavaram	Vellanki Visweswara Rao	Communist Party of India
73	Nandigama	Pillalamarri Venkateswarlu	Communist Party of India
74	Kanchikacherla	Maganti Ramaiah	Indian National Congress
75	Tiruvur	Peta Bapayya	Indian National Congress
76	Nuzvid	Meka Rangayyapparao Bahaddaru	Indian National Congress
77	Vuyyur	Kakani Venkataratnam	Indian National Congress
78	Malleswaram	Pennenti Pamideswararao	Indian National Congress
79	Bandar	Kolipara Vankataramanayya	Indian National Congress
80	Devi	Srimanth Raja	Indian National Congress
80	Devi	Mallepudi Rajeswara Rao Yarlagadda Siva Rama Prasad Bahadur Garu	Indian National Congress
81	Kuchinapudi	Angani Bhagavantha Rao	Krishikar Lok Party
82	Repalle	Yadam Channaiah	Indian National Congress
83	Vemur	Kalluri Chandramouli	Indian National Congress
84	Duggirala	Putumbaka Sriramulu	Indian National Congress
85	Tenali	Alapati Venkatramayya	Indian National Congress
86	Ponnur	Govada Paramdhamaiah	Krishikar Lok Party
87	Bapatla	Mantena Venkataraju	Indian National Congress
88	Chirala	Pragada Kotaiah	Indian National Congress
89	Paruchuru	Kolla Ramajah	Indian National Congress
90	Peddakakani	Ginjupalli Bapayya	Krishikar Lok Party
91	Mangalagiri	Meka Koti Reddy	Indian National Congress
92	Guntur I	Tellakula Jalayya	Indian National Congress
93	Guntur II	Meduri Nageshwararao	Indian National Congress
94	Peddakurapadu	Ganapa Ramaswami Reddy	Krishikar Lok Party
95	Phirangipuram	Kasu Brahmananda Reddy	Indian National Congress
96	Sattenpalli	Vavilala Gopalkrishnaiah	Communist Party of India
97	Gurzala	Mandava Bapayya Chowdary	Krishikar Lok Party
98	Macherla	Mandapati Nagi Reddy	Communist Party of India
99	Venukonda	Nalabolu Govindrajulu	Indian National Congress
100	Martur	Bandlamudi Venkatasivayya	Krishikar Lok Party
101	Narasarao	Nalapati Venkatramayya	Indian National Congress
102	Addanki	Nagineni Venkaiah	Krishikar Lok Party
103	Ammanabarolu	Jagarlamudi Chandramouli	Indian National Congress
104	Ongole	T. Prakasam	Indian National Congress
104	Ongole	Telluri Jiyyardass	Indian National Congress
105	Darsi	Dirisala Venkataramana Reddy	Indian National Congress
106	Podili	Sanikommu Kasi Reddy	Communist Party of India
107	Kanigiri	Gujjula Yallamanda Reddy	Communist Party of India
108	Udayagiri	Sheik Moula Saheb	Indian National Congress
109	Nandipad	Kasim Venkata Reddy	Independent
110	Kandukur	Devi Kondaiah Chowdary	Indian National Congress
111	Kondapi	Nalamothu Chenchuramananaidu	Indian National Congress
112	Kavali	Bathena Ramakrishna Reddy	Praja Party
113	Buchireddipalem	Basavareddi Sankaraiah	Communist Party of India
113	Buchireddipalem	Swarna Vemaya	Communist Party of India
114	Atmakur	Bezawada Gopala Reddy	Indian National Congress
115	Venkatagiri	Padileti Venkataswami Reddy	Indian National Congress
115	Venkatagiri	Kamatham Shanmugam	Indian National Congress
116	Nellore	Anam Chenchu Subba Reddy	Indian National Congress
117	Sarvapalli	Bezawada Gopala Reddy	Indian National Congress
118	Gudur	Merlapaka Munuswami	Indian National Congress
118	Gudur	Pelleti Gopalakrishna Reddy	Indian National Congress
119	Kalahasti	Patra Singaraiah	Indian National Congress
119	Kalahasti	Neelam Sanjeeva Reddy	Indian National Congress
120	Vadamalpet	R. B. Ramakrishna Raju	Independent
121	Tiruttani (Note: Tiruttani was a part of Andhra State before the Andhra Pradesh and Madras Alteration of Boundaries Act.)	Doraikannu M.	Indian National Congress
121	Tiruttani	Gopalu Reddy	Indian National Congress
122	Ramakrishnarajupet	Ranganatha Modaliar	Independent
123	Epanjeri	Chenagalaraya Naidu N. P.	Indian National Congress
124	Chittoor	Chinnama Reddy	Indian National Congress
125	Tavanmapalle	Rajagopala Naidu P.	Krishikar Lok Party
126	Kuppam	Ramabhrmham D.	Indian National Congress
127	Punganur	Raja Veerabasava Chikkaroyal Y. B.	Independent
127	Punganur	Rathnam	Indian National Congress
128	Madanapalle	Gopalakrishnayya Gupta T.	Indian National Congress
129	Thamballapalle	T. N. Venkatasubba Reddy	Indian National Congress
130	Vayalpad	Thimma Reddy P.	Indian National Congress
131	Pileru	Veakatarama Naidu N.	Krishikar Lok Party
132	Tirupathi	Raddivari Nathamuni Reddy	Indian National Congress
133	Rajampet	Pothuraju Parthasarathi	Indian National Congress
133	Rajampet	Pal Venkata Subbayya	Indian National Congress
134	Rayachoty	Y. Audinarayana Reddy	Indian National Congress
135	Lakkireddipalli	K.Koti Reddy	Indian National Congress
136	Kadapa	Mahammad Rahamathulla Shaik	Indian National Congress
137	Badvel	Ratnasabhapathy Setty Bandaru	Praja Socialist Party
138	Myduku	Rama Reddy Bommu	Independent
139	Proddattur	Kandula Balanarayana Reddy	Indian National Congress
140	Jammalamadugu	Kunda Ramaiah	Indian National Congress
141	Kamalapuram	Nareddy Sambhu Reddy	Indian National Congress
142	Pulivendla	P. Basi Reddy	Indian National Congress
143	Kadiri	K. V. Vema Reddy	Indian National Congress
144	Nallamada	Biappa Reddy	Indian National Congress
145	Gorantla	Pulla Venkataravanappa	Indian National Congress
146	Hindupur	Kallur Subba Rao	Indian National Congress
146	Hindupur	Rukmini Devi B.	Indian National Congress
147	Penukonda	Chithambara Reddy	Indian National Congress
148	Dharmavaram	Ramachariu Pappoor	Indian National Congress
148	Dharmavaram	Santhappa	Indian National Congress
149	Anantapur	P. Anthoni Reddy	Indian National Congress
150	Putloor	Tarimela Ramachandra Reddy	Indian National Congress
151	Tadpatri	Challa Subbarayudu	Indian National Congress
152	Gooty	Raja Ram	Indian National Congress
152	Gooty	Sanda Narayanappa	Indian National Congress
153	Rayadrug	Seshadri	Indian National Congress
154	Alur	Ramalinga Reddy H.	Indian National Congress
155	Adoni	Bussanna G.	Praja Socialist Party
156	Kosigi	Thimmayya Setty T. G.	Indian National Congress
157	Yemmiganur	Sanjivayya	Indian National Congress
157	Yemmiganur	Vijaya Bhaskara Reddy	Indian National Congress
158	Pattikonda	Hanumantha Reddy	Indian National Congress
159	Dhone	B. P. Sesha Reddy	Independent
160	Kurnool	Mahaboob Ali Khan	Indian National Congress
161	Nandikotkur	N. K. Lingam	Indian National Congress
161	Nandikotkur	Ayyapa Reddy	Indian National Congress
162	Nandyal	Gopavaram Rami Reddy	Independent
163	Kolikuntla	Subba Reddy B. V.	Independent
164	Sirval	Chintakunta Peda Thimma Reddy	Indian National Congress
165	Giddalur	Pidathala Ranga Reddy	Indian National Congress
166	Markapuram	Kandula Obul Reddy	Krishikar Lok Party
167	Yerragondipalem	Nakka Venkatayya	Indian National Congress

^{*} : On 1 October 1953, a separate Andhra State, consisting of the Telugu-speaking areas of the composite Madras State, with 167 constituencies with 190 seats in the Assembly, was formed. On 1 November 1956, Andhra State was merged with Hyderabad State under States Reorganisation Act, 1956, to form a single state, Andhra Pradesh. The districts of Raichur, Gulbarga and the Marathwada district were detached from the Hyderabad State, while merging with Andhra State. In addition, the Siruguppa taluk, the Bellary taluk, the Hospet taluk and a small area of the Mallapuram sub-taluk were transferred from Mysore State to Andhra Pradesh. The districts of Raichur and Gulbarga were transferred to the Mysore State, while the Marathwada district was transferred to the Bombay State. This resulted in re-organization of assembly constituencies of Andhra Pradesh giving way to 85 constituencies with 105 seats in the assembly.

== See also ==
- 1954 elections in India
- 1957 elections in India
