= 1954 elections in India =

Elections in India
- 1954

The 1954 elections in India consists of two elections, to Legislative Assemblies.

== Legislative Assembly elections ==
Legislative Assembly elections in India were conducted for Patiala & East Punjab States Union legislative assembly and Travancore-Cochin legislative assembly in 1954. In Patiala & East Punjab States Union, Indian National Congress won an absolute majority. While in Travancore-Cochin, no single party got the majority.

=== Patiala & East Punjab States Union^{*} ===
Summary of results of the 1954 Patiala & East Punjab States Union Legislative Assembly election
Political party	Flag	Seats Contested	Won	Net change in seats	% of Seats	Votes	Vote %	Change in vote %
Indian National Congress		60	37	▲9	61.67	6,96,979	43.27	▲14.61
Shiromani Akali Dal (Mann Group)		33	10	New	16.67	3,34,423	20.76	New
Shiromani Akali Dal (Raman Group)		22	2	New	3.33	1,19,301	7.41	New
Communist Party of India		10	4	▲2	6.67	97,690	6.06	▲1.29
Independent		139	7	▼1	11.67	3,42,787	21.28	N/A
		Total seats	60 ( 0)	Voters	26,48,175	Turnout	16,10,909 (60.83%)	

^{*} : On 1 November 1956, under States Reorganisation Act, 1956, Patiala & East Punjab States Union was merged with Punjab.

=== Travancore-Cochin^{*} ===
Summary of results of the 1954 Travancore-Cochin Legislative Assembly election
Political party	Flag	Seats Contested	Won	Net Change in seats	% of Seats	Votes	Vote %	Change in vote %
Indian National Congress		115	45	▲1	38.46	17,62,820	45.32	▲9.88
Communist Party of India		36	23	New	19.66	6,52,613	16.78	New
Praja Socialist Party		38	19	New	16.24	6,32,623	16.26	New
Travancore Tamil Nadu Congress		16	12	▲4	10.26	2,37,411	6.10	▲0.18
Revolutionary Socialist Party		12	9	▲3	7.69	212354	5.46	▲1.98
Independent		47	9	▼28	7.69	3,91,612	10.07	N/A
		Total seats	117 (▲9)	Voters	52,51,560	Turnout	38,89,836 (74.07%)	

^{*} : In 1956, under States Reorganisation Act, 1956, Travancore-Cochin state was merged with the Malabar district of Madras State, Kasaragod taluk of the South Canara district and the Amindive Islands to form a new state Kerala. The southern part of Travancore-Cochin, Kanyakumari district was transferred to Madras State.

== See also ==
- 1951–52 elections in India
- 1955 elections in India
