= Election Commission =

Election Commission refers to an election commission, a body which regulates elections. It may specifically refer to:

- Election Commission of India
  - State election commission (India)
    - Andhra Pradesh State Election Commission
    - Arunachal Pradesh State Election Commission
    - Assam State Election Commission
    - Bihar State Election Commission
    - Chhattisgarh State Election Commission
    - Delhi State Election Commission
    - Goa State Election Commission
    - Gujarat State Election Commission
    - Himachal Pradesh State Election Commission
    - Jammu and Kashmir State Election Commission
    - Jharkhand State Election Commission
    - Karnataka State Election Commission
    - Kerala State Election Commission
    - Madhya Pradesh State Election Commission
    - Maharashtra State Election Commission
    - Manipur State Election Commission
    - Meghalaya State Election Commission
    - Mizoram State Election Commission
    - Nagaland State Election Commission
    - Odisha State Election Commission
    - Punjab State Election Commission
    - Puducherry State Election Commission
    - Rajasthan State Election Commission
    - Sikkim State Election Commission
    - Tamil Nadu State Election Commission
    - Telangana State Election Commission
    - Tripura State Election Commission
    - Uttar Pradesh State Election Commission
    - Uttarakhand State Election Commission
    - West Bengal State Election Commission
- Election Commission of Pakistan
- Election Commission of Thailand
- Election Commission of Malaysia
- Election Commission of Sri Lanka
- Election Commission, Nepal
- Bangladesh Election Commission

== See also ==
- Election Committee (disambiguation)
- National Electoral Commission (disambiguation)
- Chief Election Commissioner (disambiguation)
- Election Commissioner of India
- Electoral Commission (Ireland)
- Electoral Commission (New Zealand)
- Electoral Commission (United Kingdom)
- Electoral Commission (United States) (1877), to resolve the 1876 United States presidential election
