= State election commission (India) =

State-level electoral agencies

States Election Commission is an autonomous and constitutional body empowered to conduct free and fair elections to local self government institutions in the states and union territories of India. Established as per the provisions of Article 243 of the Constitution of India, the states Election Commissions are responsible for conducting elections for the local bodies at the state level. It is supervised by a state election commissioner appointed by the Governor of the corresponding state.

== Structure ==
State Election Commissions are autonomous bodies that were formed as per the Article 243K of the Constitution of India. It is headed by a state election commissioner, who is appointed by the Governor of the respective state. The term of the commissioner can be a maximum of five years from the date on which he/she assumes his office. However, the commissioner retires from office if he/she attains the age of sixty-five years before the expiry of the term. The commissioner can also be removed if found to be of unsound mind, declared insolvent, or convicted of criminal offences. The commission consists of as many members and staff specified as are required by the acts of respective state governments. Election Commissioners are independent persons not holding position or office in any central or state government organisations.

== Functions ==
States Election Commission in India are responsible for the supervision of state level elections. It is responsible for conducting elections to urban local bodies such as municipal corporations and municipalities, and panchayat institutions such as village panchayats, block panchayats, and district councils. It is also responsible for the implementation of a model code of conduct during the election process, and updation of electoral rolls.

At the states and union territories, the elections to the national, the state legislative assemblies, state legislative councils and the offices of the president are conducted under the direction of the Election Commission of India and is supervised by the chief electoral officer of the state or union territory. At the district and constituency levels, election related work is carried out by the district election officers, electoral registration officers and returning officers.

== List of state election commissions ==
Following is the list of Election Commissions for each state and union territory in India:

State	Election Commission
Andhra Pradesh	Andhra Pradesh Election Commission
Arunachal Pradesh	Arunachal Pradesh State Election Commission
Assam	Assam State Election Commission
Bihar	Bihar State Election Commission
Chhattisgarh	Chhattisgarh State Election Commission
Delhi	Delhi State Election Commission
Goa	Goa State Election Commission
Gujarat	Gujarat State Election Commission
Haryana	Haryana State Election Commission
Himachal Pradesh	Himachal Pradesh State Election Commission
Jammu and Kashmir	Jammu and Kashmir State Election Commission
Jharkhand	Jharkhand State Election Commission
Karnataka	Karnataka State Election Commission
Kerala	Kerala State Election Commission
Madhya Pradesh	Madhya Pradesh State Election Commission
Maharashtra	Maharashtra State Election Commission
Manipur	Manipur State Election Commission
Meghalaya	Meghalaya State Election Commission
Mizoram	Mizoram State Election Commission
Nagaland	Nagaland State Election Commission
Odisha	Odisha State Election Commission
Punjab	Punjab State Election Commission
Puducherry	Puducherry State Election Commission
Rajasthan	Rajasthan State Election Commission
Sikkim	Sikkim State Election Commission
Tamil Nadu	Tamil Nadu State Election Commission
Telangana	Telangana State Election Commission
Tripura	Tripura State Election Commission
Uttar Pradesh	Uttar Pradesh State Election Commission
Uttarakhand	Uttarakhand State Election Commission
West Bengal	West Bengal State Election Commission

== See also ==
- Election Commission of India
