= 2022 Madhya Pradesh panchayat elections =

Local elections in Madhya Pradesh, India

- 25 June, 1 and 8 July 2022

394,233 posts
- Registered: 39,378,502
- Turnout: 80.31%

The 2022 Madhya Pradesh panchayat elections was held in three phases on 25 June, 1 July and 8 July 2022, in the Indian state of Madhya Pradesh. 39,378,502 voters will elect members to 394,233 posts, across all three tiers of the panchayats, and since Electronic voting machines are not being used, over 575 t (566 long tons; 634 short tons) of paper is expected to be used during the elections.

The Bharatiya Janata Party said it has won the district panchayat president and vice-president in 41 districts. The Indian National Congress claimed victories in 9 districts, whereas the Gondwana Ganatantra Party claimed victory in 1 district.

== Election schedule ==
The Madhya Pradesh State Election Commission announced that the Polls would be held in three Phases.

Election Schedule
Event	Date		
Event	Phase 1 (Note: 115 Janpad Panchayats and 8,702 Gram Panchayats)	Phase 2 (Note: 106 Janpad Panchayats and 7,661 Gram Panchayats)	Phase 3 (Note: 92 Janpad Panchayats and 6,649 Gram Panchayat)
Start of nomination	30 May 2022		
Last date for the withdrawal of candidature	10 June 2022		
Election	25 June 2022	1 July 2022	8 July 2022
Vote counting	8 July 2022	11 July 2022	14 July 2022
Announcement of results (P, SP, JP) (Note: Panch, Sarpanch and Janpad Panchayats)	14 July 2022		
Announcement of results (ZP) (Note: Zilla Panchayat members)	15 July 2022		

Total Posts
Post		Number of posts
Zilla Panchayat member	52 districts	875
Janpad Panchayat member	313 Janpads	6,771
Sarpanch	22,921 Gram panchayats	22,921
Panch	22,921 Gram panchayats	363,726
Total		394,233

== Polling ==
The first phase of the polling was on 25 June. It covered 8,702 village panchayats and 26,902 polling stations. There were some instances of violence in some districts of the state. Election officials reported a voter turnout of 77%.

The second phase of the polling was on 1 July. It covered 7,655 village panchayats and 23,967 polling stations. There was a voter turnout of 80%.

The third and final phase of the polling was on 8 July. It covered 6,607 village panchayats and 20,608 polling stations. The overall voter turnout of all three phases was 80.31%.

== See also ==
- 2018 Madhya Pradesh Legislative Assembly election
- 2019 Indian general election in Madhya Pradesh
- Panchayati raj
