= Haryana State Election Commission =

Electoral agency of Haryana, India

Haryana State Election Commission is an autonomous and statutory body constituted in Indian state of Haryana for ensuring that elections are conducted in free, fair and unbiased way. Constitution of India with provisions as per Article 324 ensures creation and safeguarding of the powers of Election Commission. Haryana State Election Commission is responsible for conducting elections for Urban Local Bodies like Municipalities, Municipal Corporations, Panchayats and any other specified by Election Commission of India. Haryana State Election Commissioner is appointed by Governor of Haryana.

== History and Administration ==
Haryana State Election Commission was formed in year 1966. State Election Commission in India for respective states were formed in accordance with powers of Election Commission of India, which was constituted in year 1950 to supervise state level elections. Haryana State Election commissioner is appointed by Governor. To ensure the autonomy of the position the state election commissioner cannot be removed from office except on the grounds and manner specified for judge of High Court.

In year 2016, Haryana State Election Commission had introduced and released E-Dashboard, a web based online application for conducting elections to Urban Local Bodies and Panchayat Institutions.

== Powers and Responsibilities ==
Haryana State Election Commission is responsible for the following:

- Conducting elections for Municipal Corporations in State.
- Conducting elections for Municipal panchayats in State.
- Laying guidelines for persons eligible to contest in elections for Municipal panchayats in State.
- Laying guidelines for persons eligible to contest in elections for Municipal Corporations in State.
- Model code of conduct are following in elections for local bodies.
- Laying guidelines for voters voting in elections.
- Updating Electoral rolls with new additions.
- Updating Electoral rolls with removals, if any.

== Composition ==
Haryana State Election Commission consists of Chief Commissioner and as many members and staff specified as are required by the Acts of respective state Governments. State Election Commissioners are independent persons not holding position or office in any Central or State Government organisations.

Dhanpat Singh, a retired civil servant of 1985 batch is the current Chief Commissioner of Haryana State Election Commission. He will serve for a period of four years.

== Constitutional Requirements ==
Haryana State Election Commission was formed after amendment of Constitution with 73rd and 74th declaration with the objective of supervision and guiding preparation of electoral rolls for local governing body and to conduct elections in municipalities and panchayats . State Election Commissions were formed as per Article 243K of the Constitution, similar to setting up of Election commission of India as per Article 324.

== See also ==
- Election Commission of India
- State election commission (India)
