= Mizoram State Election Commission =

Election regulatory body of the Indian state of Mizoram

Agency overview
- Jurisdiction: Mizoram
- Headquarters: STATE ELECTION COMMISSION, MIZORAM, B. Sanghnuna Building, Tuikhuahtlang.Aizawl – 796001, Mizoram.
- Agency executive: Sri Laima Chozah., Chief Election Commissioner.
- Website: sec.mizoram.gov.in ceomizoram.nic.in

Mizoram State Election Commission is an autonomous and statutory body constituted in Indian state of Mizoram for ensuring that elections in are conducted in free, fair and unbiased way. Constitution of India with provisions as per Article 243K and 243 ZA and Article 324 ensures creation and safeguarding of the powers of State Election Commissions. Mizoram State Election Commission is responsible for conducting elections for Urban Local Bodies like Municipalities, Municipal Corporations, Panchayats (Village Councils & Local Councils), Autonomous District Councils (Mara, Lai & Chakma) and Sinlung Hills Development Council. Mizoram State Election Commissioner is appointed by Governor of Mizoram.

== History and Administration ==
Mizoram State Election Commission was formed in accordance with powers of Election Commission of India, which was constituted in year 1950 to supervise state level elections. State election commissioner is appointed by Governor. To ensure the autonomy of the position, the Mizoram state election commissioner cannot be removed from office except on the grounds and manner specified for judge of High Court.

== Powers and Responsibilities ==
Mizoram States Election Commission is responsible for the following:

- Releasing election schedule.
- Issue notification containing guidelines for conducting elections for Municipal Corporations in State.
- Conducting elections for Municipal Corporations in State.
- Issue notification containing guidelines for conducting elections for conducting elections for Municipal panchayats in State.
- Conducting elections for Municipal panchayats in State.
- Laying guidelines for persons eligible to contest in elections for Municipal Corporations in State.
- Model code of conduct are following in elections for local bodies.
- Declaration of results of elections held for Municipal Corporations in State.
- Declaration of results of elections held for Municipal panchayats in State
- Ordering repoll if needed.
- Making arrangements for Statewide polls.
- Monitoring poll expenditure for Panchayat polls.
- Laying guidelines for issue of opinion polls.
- Decision on conducting elections.
- Ensure proper counting of votes polled in local body polls.
- Declaring results of local body polls.
- Municipal and Panchayat constituencies delimitation exercise.
- Countermanding elections in case of mal practices.
- Issuing guidelines for voting in local body elections.
- Organising demonstration of Electronic Voting machine and VVPAT.

== Composition ==
Mizoram State Election Commission is headed by Chief Election Commissioner, Secretary and as many members as specified in State Act. State Election Commissioners are independent persons not holding position or office in any Central or State Government organisations.

Sri Laima Chozah, is the Chief Election Commissioner of Mizoram State Election Commission. His period of service will be 5 years or attaining an age of 65 years whichever is earlier.

== Constitutional Requirements ==
Mizoram State Election Commission was formed after amendment of Constitution with 73rd and 74th declaration. State Election Commissions were formed as per Article 243K of the Constitution, similar to setting up of Election commission of India as per Article 324.

== See also ==
Election Commission of India.
