= 2022 Madhya Pradesh local elections =

2022 Madhya Pradesh local elections refers to:

- 2022 Madhya Pradesh municipal elections
- 2022 Madhya Pradesh panchayat elections
