= Gujarat State Election Commission =

Election regulatory body of Gujarat

Agency overview
- Formed: September' 1993
- Jurisdiction: Gujarat
- Headquarters: Address: State Election Commission, Sardar Patel Bhavan, Sector No. 10, Block 9, 6th Floor, Gandhinagar, Gujarat 382010. Phone No.:(O) 079-23252149, Fax No.:079-23252307. Office Time : 10:30 a.m. to 6:10 p.m. E-mail : commi-sec @gujarat.gov.in sec-sec @gujarat.gov.in
- Agency executive: Shri Sanjay Prasad., Chief Election Commissioner
- Website: sec.gujarat.gov.in

Gujarat State Election Commission is an autonomous and statutory body constituted in the Indian state of Gujarat for ensuring that elections in Gujarat are conducted in a free, fair and unbiased way. The Constitution of India with provisions as per Article 243K and 243 ZA and Article 324 ensures the creation and safeguarding of the powers of State Election Commissions. Gujarat State Election Commission is responsible for conducting elections for Urban Local Bodies like Municipalities, Municipal Corporations, Panchayats and any other specified by Election Commission of India. Gujarat State Election Commissioner is appointed by Governor.

== History and Administration ==
Gujarat State Election Commission was formed in accordance with powers of Election Commission of India, which was constituted in year 1950 to supervise state level elections. State Election Commission, Gujarat was constituted in September 1993 under Article 243K of the Constitution of India. State Election Commission has been entrusted with the function of conducting free, fair and impartial elections to the local bodies in the state. State election commissioner is appointed by Governor. To ensure the autonomy of the position, the Gujarat state election commissioner cannot be removed from office except on the grounds and manner specified for judge of High Court.

== Powers and Responsibilities ==
State election commission carries out activities related to preparation of wards / election division as per local bodies rules, decision of boundaries and distribution of seats along with preparation of voters list for the local bodies organizations like Gram Panchayat, Taluka and District Panchayat / Municipality and Municipal Corporation of the state and conducting general / mid-term / bye-elections and supervising them. For all these functions, the authority is vested in the State Election Commission under Article 243 K under which it has been empowered with Superintendence, Direction and Control of elections of local bodies.

As per the election rules of such local self government organizations, District Election Officer for Panchayat elections, District Municipal Election Officer for elections of municipality and City Election Officer for the elections of municipal corporation have been appointed. State election commission has empowered the collectors for all activities related to elections of Gram Panchayat where as the delimitation and allocation of seats for various reserved categories, voter's list, election programs and other related activities are carrying out by State Election Commission.

Gujarat States Election Commissioner is responsible for the following:

- Releasing election schedule.
- Issue notification containing guidelines for conducting elections for Municipal Corporations in State.
- Conducting elections for Municipal Corporations in State.
- Issue notification containing guidelines for conducting elections for conducting elections for Municipal panchayats in State.
- Conducting elections for Municipal panchayats in State.
- Laying guidelines for persons eligible to contest in elections for Municipal Corporations in State.
- Conducting elections for Municipal panchayats in State.
- Model code of conduct are following in elections for local bodies.
- Updating Electoral rolls with new additions.
- Updating Electoral rolls with removals, if any.
- Declaration of results of elections held for Municipal Corporations in State.
- Declaration of results of elections held for Municipal panchayats in State.
- Ordering repoll if needed.
- Making arrangements for Statewide polls.
- Monitoring poll expenditure for Panchayat polls.
- Laying guidelines for issue of opinion polls.
- Decision on conducting elections.
- Declaring results of local body polls.

== Composition ==
Gujarat State Election Commission is headed by Chief Election Commissioner and as many members as specified in State Act. State Election Commissioners are independent persons not holding position or office in any Central or State Government organisations

Smt. P. Bharathi, I.A.S., is the Chief Electoral Officer (CEO) and Shri Sanjay Prasad is the Chief Election Commissioner of Gujarat State Election Commission. His period of service will be 5 years or attaining an age of 65 years whichever is earlier.

State Government has appointed Shri Sanjay Prasad, IAS (Retd) as State Election Commissioner with effect from 03/09/2019

== Constitutional Requirements ==
Gujarat State Election Commission was formed after amendment of Constitution with 73rd and 74th declaration. State Election Commissions were formed as per Article 243K of the Constitution, similar to setting up of Election commission of India as per Article 324.

== See also ==
- Election Commission of India
