= West Bengal State Election Commission =

Electoral agency of West Bengal, India

Constitutional body overview
- Formed: 1966
- Jurisdiction: West Bengal
- Headquarters: 18, Sarojini Naidu Sarani (Rawdon Street) Kolkata - 700 017
- Constitutional body executive: Neelam Meena, Chief Electoral Officer
- Parent Constitutional body: Election Commission of India
- Key document: Constitution of India (Article 324)
- Website: ceowestbengal.wb.gov.in

West Bengal State Election Commission (WBSEC) is an autonomous and constitutional body, constituted in Indian state of West Bengal for ensuring that elections are conducted in free, fair and unbiased way. Constitution of India with provisions as per Article 324 ensures creation and safeguarding of the powers of Election Commission. West Bengal State Election Commission is responsible for conducting elections for Urban Local Bodies like Municipalities, Municipal Corporations, Panchayats and any other specified by Election Commission of India. West Bengal State Election Commissioner is appointed by Governor of West Bengal.

== History and Administration ==
West Bengal State Election Commission was formed for the State similar to powers of Election Commission of India, which was constituted in year 1950 to supervise state level elections. West Bengal State Election commissioner is appointed by Governor. To ensure the autonomy of the position the state election commissioner cannot be removed from office except on the grounds and manner specified for judge of High Court.

== Powers and Responsibilities ==
West Bengal State Election Commission is responsible for the following:

- Issue notification containing guidelines for conducting elections for Municipal Corporations in State.
- Conducting elections for Municipal Corporations in State.
- Issue notification containing guidelines for conducting elections for conducting elections for Municipal panchayats in State.
- Conducting elections for Municipal panchayats in State.
- Laying guidelines for persons eligible to contest in elections for Municipal panchayats in State.
- Laying guidelines for persons eligible to contest in elections for Municipal Corporations in State.
- Model code of conduct are following in elections for local bodies.
- Laying guidelines for voters voting in elections.
- Updating Electoral rolls with new additions.
- Updating Electoral rolls with removals, if any.

== Composition ==
West Bengal State Election Commission consists of Chief Commissioner and as many members and staff specified as are required by the Acts of respective state Governments. State Election Commissioners are independent persons not holding position or office in any Central or State Government organisations.

Rajiv sinha, is the current Chief Commissioner of West Bengal State Election Commission. He will serve for a period of four years.

== Constitutional Requirements ==
West Bengal State Election Commission was formed after amendment of Constitution with 73rd and 74th declaration with the objective of supervision and guiding preparation of electoral rolls for local governing body and to conduct elections in municipalities and panchayats . State Election Commissions were formed as per Article 243K of the Constitution, similar to setting up of Election commission of India as per Article 324.

== See also ==
- Election Commission of India
- States Election Commission (India)
