= Himachal Pradesh State Election Commission =

Electoral agency in India

- राज्य चुनाव आयोग हिमाचल प्रदेश

Agency overview
- Formed: 23 April 1994
- Jurisdiction: Himachal Pradesh
- Headquarters: Armsdale Building, HP Secretariat, Chotta Shimla -171002. Phone (Office): 0177-2620152.(Fax):2620152.Email: secysec-hp@nic.in
- Agency executives: Sri Anil Kumar Khachi, IAS (Retd.), State Election Commissioner; Sh. Surjeet Singh Rathore, Secretary, State Election Commission; Electoral Officer, Sh. Sanjeev Kumar Mahajan
- Website: https://sechimachal.nic.in

Himachal Pradesh State Election Commission is an autonomous and constitutional body constituted in Indian state of Himachal Pradesh for ensuring that elections are conducted in free, fair and unbiased way. Constitution of India with provisions as per Article 243K and 243ZA ensures creation and safeguarding of the powers of State Election Commissions. Himachal Pradesh State Election Commission is responsible for conducting elections for Urban Local Bodies and Panchayati Raj Institutions like Municipalities, Municipal Corporations, Panchayats. Himachal Pradesh State Election Commissioner is appointed by Governor of Himachal Pradesh.

== History and Administration ==
Himachal Pradesh State Election Commission was constituted on 23 April 1994 for the superintendence, direction and control of the preparation of electoral rolls for, and the conduct of, all elections to the Urban Local Bodies and Panchayati Raj Institutions State election commissioner is appointed by Governor. To ensure the autonomy of the position, the Himachal Pradesh state election commissioner cannot be removed from office except on the grounds and manner specified for judge of High Court.

Himachal Pradesh State Election Commission had introduced Electoral Roll Management System (ERMS).

== Powers and Responsibilities ==
Himachal Pradesh States Election Commissioner is responsible for the following:

- Releasing election schedule.
- Issue notification containing guidelines for conducting elections for Municipal Corporations in State.
- Conducting elections for Municipal Corporations in State.
- Issue notification containing guidelines for conducting elections for conducting elections for panchayats in State.
- Conducting elections for panchayats in State.
- Laying guidelines for persons eligible to contest in elections for Municipal Corporations in State.
- Conducting elections for panchayats in State.
- Model code of conduct are following in elections for local bodies.
- Updating Electoral rolls with new additions.
- Updating Electoral rolls with removals, if any.
- Declaration of results of elections held for Municipal Corporations in State.
- Declaration of results of elections held for panchayats in State.
- Ordering repoll if needed.
- Making arrangements for Statewide polls.
- Monitoring poll expenditure for Panchayat polls.

== Composition ==
Himachal Pradesh State Election Commission is headed by State Election Commissioner and as many members as specified in State Act. State Election Commissioners are independent persons not holding position or office in any Central or State Government organizations

Shri Anil Kumar Khachi IAS (Retd.), is the State Election Commissioner of Himachal Pradesh State Election Commission. His period of service will be 5 years or attaining an age of 65 years whichever is earlier.

== Constitutional Requirements ==
Himachal Pradesh State Election Commission was formed after amendment of Constitution with 73rd and 74th declaration. State Election Commissions were formed as per Article 243K of the Constitution.

== See also ==
- Election Commission of India
