= Odisha State Election Commission =

Election regulatory body of Odisha, India

Agency overview
- Formed: May'1994
- Jurisdiction: Odisha
- Headquarters: Commissioner-cum-Secretary, Cooperation Department, Govt. of Odisha.
- Agency executive: Sri Aditya Prasad Padhi, IAS (Retd.), Chief Election Commissioner
- Website: sec.odisha.gov.in

The Odisha State Election Commission is an autonomous and statutory body constituted in the Indian state of Odisha for ensuring that elections are conducted in free, fair and unbiased way. Constitution of India with provisions as per Article 243K and 243 ZA and Article 324 ensures creation and safeguarding of the powers of State Election Commissions. Odisha State Election Commission is responsible for conducting elections for Urban Local Bodies like Municipalities, Municipal Corporations, Panchayats and any other specified by Election Commission of India. Odisha State Election Commissioner is appointed by Governor of Odisha.

== History and administration ==
The then-Orissa State Election Commission was formed in accordance with powers of Election Commission of India, which was constituted in year 1950 to supervise state level elections. State election commissioner is appointed by Governor. To ensure the autonomy of the position, the state election commissioner cannot be removed from office except on the grounds and manner specified for judge of High Court.

== Powers and responsibilities ==
The State Election Commissioner is responsible for the following:

- Issue notification containing guidelines for conducting elections for Municipal Corporations in State.
- Conducting elections for Municipal Corporations in State.
- Issue notification containing guidelines for conducting elections for conducting elections for Municipal panchayats in State.
- Conducting elections for Municipal panchayats in State.
- Laying guidelines for persons eligible to contest in elections for Municipal Corporations in State.
- Conducting elections for Municipal panchayats in State.
- Model code of conduct are following in elections for local bodies.
- Updating Electoral rolls with new additions.
- Updating Electoral rolls with removals, if any.
- Declaration of results of elections held for Municipal Corporations in State.
- Declaration of results of elections held for Municipal panchayats in State.
- Ordering repoll if needed.
- Making arrangements for Statewide polls.
- Monitoring poll expenditure for Panchayat polls.

== Composition ==
Odisha State Election Commission is headed by Chief Electoral Officer and as many members as specified in State Act. State Election Commissioners are independent persons not holding position or office in any Central or State Government organisations

Aditya Prasad Padhi, I.A.S., Retd, is the Chief Electoral Officer of Odisha. His period of service will be 5 years or attaining an age of 65 years whichever is earlier.

== Constitutional requirements ==
Odisha State Election Commission was formed after amendment of Constitution with 73rd and 74th declaration. State Election Commissions were formed as per Article 243K of the Constitution, similar to setting up of the Election Commission of India as per Article 324.

== See also ==
- Election Commission of India
