= Jammu and Kashmir State Election Commission =

Statutory body for conducting elections in the state of Jammu and Kashmir, India

Jammu & Kashmir State Election Commission
Agency overview
- Jurisdiction: Jammu & Kashmir and Ladakh
- Headquarters: STATE ELECTION COMMISSION,
- Agency executives: K K Sharma., Chief Election Commissioner .; Hirdesh Kumar., Chief Electoral Officer.
- Website: secjk.nic.in ceojk.nic.in/FAQ.htm

Jammu & Kashmir State Election Commission is an autonomous and statutory body constituted in Indian Union Territory of Jammu and Kashmir and Ladakh for ensuring that elections are conducted in free, fair and unbiased way. Constitution of India with provisions as per Article 243K and 243 ZA and Article 324 ensures creation and safeguarding of the powers of State Election Commissions. Jammu & Kashmir State Election Commission is responsible for conducting the elections for Urban Local Bodies like Municipalities, Municipal Corporations, Panchayats and any other specified by Election Commission of India. Jammu & Kashmir State Election Commissioner is appointed by Governor of Jammu & Kashmir.

== History and Administration ==
Jammu & Kashmir State Election Commission was formed in accordance with powers of Election Commission of India, which was constituted in year 1950 to supervise state level elections. State election commissioner is appointed by Governor. To ensure the autonomy of the position, the Jammu & Kashmir state election commissioner cannot be removed from office except on the grounds and manner specified for judge of High Court.

== Powers and Responsibilities ==
Jammu & Kashmir State Election Commission is responsible for the following:

- Releasing election schedule.
- Issue notification containing guidelines for conducting elections for Municipal Corporations in State.
- Conducting elections for Municipal Corporations in State.
- Issue notification containing guidelines for conducting elections for conducting elections for Municipal panchayats in State.
- Conducting elections for Municipal panchayats in State.
- Laying guidelines for persons eligible to contest in elections for Municipal Corporations in State.
- Model code of conduct are following in elections for local bodies.
- Updating Electoral rolls with new additions.
- Updating Electoral rolls with removals, if any.
- Declaration of results of elections held for Municipal Corporations in the State.
- Declaration of results of elections held for Municipal panchayats in the State
- Ordering repoll if needed.
- Making arrangements for Statewide polls.
- Monitoring poll expenditure for Panchayat polls.
- Laying guidelines for issue of opinion polls.
- Decision on conducting elections.
- Ensure proper counting of votes polled in local body polls.
- Declaring results of local body polls.
- Municipal and Panchayat constituencies delimitation exercise.
- Countermanding elections in case of mal practices.
- Issuing guidelines for voting in local body elections.
- Organising demonstration of Electronic Voting machine and VVPAT.
- Ensuring security of polling stations.
- Facilitating discussions with regional parties on conducting elections.

== Composition ==
Jammu & Kashmir State Election Commission is headed by the State Election Commissioner and as many members as specified in State Act. State Election Commissioners are independent persons not holding position or office in any Central or State Government organisations.

Shri K K Sharma, is the Chief Election Commissioner of Jammu & Kashmir State Election Commission. His period of service will be 5 years or attaining an age of 65 years whichever is earlier. Shri Hirdesh Kumar, is the Chief Electoral officer of Jammu & Kashmir State Election Commission. On July 12, 2023, the government of Jammu and Kashmir appointed BR Sharma as the state election commissioner for Jammu and Kashmir. BR Sharma, born on, 27-04-1960, is the former Chief Secretary of JandK. He shall have tenure till 2025.

== Constitutional Requirements ==
Jammu & Kashmir State Election Commission was formed after amendment of Constitution with 73rd and 74th declaration. State Election Commissions were formed as per Article 243K of the Constitution, similar to setting up of Election commission of India as per Article 324.

== See also ==
- Election Commission of India
