= Karnataka State Election Commission =

Electoral agency of Karnataka, India

- ಕರ್ನಾಟಕ ರಾಜ್ಯ ಚುನಾವಣಾ ಆಯೋಗ
- Seal of Karnataka

State Election Commission Body overview
- Formed: 26 May 1993 (33 years ago)
- Preceding State Election Commission Body: Mysuru State Election Commission
- Jurisdiction: Karnataka
- Headquarters: Bengaluru
- State Election Commission Body executive: G.S.Sangreshi,., Chief Election Commissioner
- Parent department: Election Commission of India
- Website: karsec.gov.in

Karnataka State Election Commission is an State Constitutional body constituted in Indian state of Karnataka for ensuring that elections in are conducted in free, fair and unbiased way. Constitution of India with provisions as per Article 243K and 243 ZA and Article 324 ensures creation and safeguarding of the powers of State Election Commissions. Karnataka State Election Commission came into existence with the promulgation of 73rd and 74th amendment to the Constitution of India on 26 May 1993 with an objective of superintendence, direction and control of the preparation of electoral rolls and to conduct all elections to the Urban Local Bodies and Rural local bodies like Municipalities, Municipal Corporations, Panchayats and any other specified by Election Commission of India. Karnataka State Election Commissioner is appointed by Governor of Karnataka.

== History and administration ==
Karnataka State Election Commission was formed in accordance with powers of Election Commission of India, which was constituted in year 1950 to supervise state level elections. State election commissioner is appointed by Governor. To ensure the autonomy of the position, the Karnataka state election commissioner cannot be removed from office except on the grounds and manner specified for judge of High Court.

== Powers and responsibilities ==
Karnataka States Election Commissioner is responsible for the following:

- Releasing election schedule.
- Issue notification containing guidelines for conducting elections for Municipal Corporations in State.
- Conducting elections for Municipal Corporations in State.
- Issue notification containing guidelines for conducting elections for conducting elections for Municipal panchayats in State.
- Conducting elections for Municipal panchayats in State.
- Laying guidelines for persons eligible to contest in elections for Municipal Corporations in State.
- Conducting elections for Municipal panchayats in State.
- Model code of conduct are following in elections for local bodies.
- Updating Electoral rolls with new additions.
- Updating Electoral rolls with removals, if any.
- Declaration of results of elections held for Municipal Corporations in State.
- Declaration of results of elections held for Municipal panchayats in State.
- Ordering repoll if needed.
- Making arrangements for Statewide polls.
- Monitoring poll expenditure for Panchayat polls.
- Laying guidelines for issue of opinion polls.
- Decision on conducting elections.
- Declaring results of local body polls.
- Municipal and Panchayat constituencies delimitation exercise.
- Countermanding elections in case of mal practices.

== Composition ==
Karnataka State Election Commission is headed by Chief Election Commissioner and as many members as specified in State Act. State Election Commissioners are independent persons not holding position or office in any Central or State Government organisations

Sri Dr B.Basavaraju, I.A.S., Retd., is the Chief Election Commissioner of Karnataka State Election Commission. His period of service will be 5 years or attaining an age of 65 years whichever is earlier.

== Constitutional requirements ==
Karnataka State Election Commission was formed after amendment of Constitution with 73rd and 74th declaration. State Election Commissions were formed as per Article 243K of the Constitution, similar to setting up of Election commission of India as per Article 324.

== See also ==
Election Commission of India.
