= Uttar Pradesh State Election Commission =

Government commission overseeing municipal elections in Uttar Pradesh, India

State Election Commission Uttar Pradesh
- राज्य निर्वाचन आयोग उत्तर प्रदेश
- Logo of the Uttar Pradesh State Election Commission

Commission overview
- Formed: 23 April 1994; 32 years ago
- Jurisdiction: Whole of Uttar Pradesh
- Headquarters: 32, Station Road, Udaiganj, Lalkuan Lucknow, Uttar Pradesh, 226-001, India; 26.836336°N 80.93382099999997°E
- Commission executives: Manoj Kumar, IAS, Uttar Pradesh State Election Commissioner; Ved Prakash Verma, ITS, Additional State Election Commissioner
- Website: Official website

The State Election Commission Uttar Pradesh (SEC UP; IAST: Rājya Nirvācana Āyoga Uttara Pradeśa), commonly known as the Uttar Pradesh State Election Commission, is an independent constitutional body responsible for conducting elections for urban and rural local bodies—the constitutionally mandated third-tier of government in India—in the Indian state of Uttar Pradesh (UP).

== Origins ==
The commission was constituted by the Government of Uttar Pradesh in April 1994, after the passing of 73rd and 74th amendments of the Constitution of India, which mandated for a permanent indissoluble local bodies in rural and urban areas with a maximum term of five years, and allowed for the creation of state election commissions in all states to conduct elections to local-self government bodies under the newly-inducted article 243K.

== Functions ==
The commission is responsible for conducting elections to gram panchayats (village councils), kshetra panchayats (regional councils), and zila panchayats (district councils) under the U. P. Panchayati Raj Act, 1947 and U. P. (Kshettra Panchayats and Zila Panchayats) Adhiniyam, 1961 and nagar palika parishads (municipal councils), nagar panchayats (city councils), and municipal corporations under the U. P. Municipalities Act, 1916 in the state of Uttar Pradesh.

District magistrates—under the general superintendence of the state election commission—are responsible for the conduct of local body elections in their respective districts.

The commission is also vested with the power of general supervision of preparation of electoral rolls for local body election in Uttar Pradesh. The Election Commission of India—the constitutional body responsible for conducting presidential, vice-presidential, parliamentary and state legislative elections in India—can share its electoral rolls with the state election commission, but the latter is otherwise independent from it, whilst being vested with the same powers as the former for local body elections.

== Organisation ==
The commission is headed by the Uttar Pradesh State Election Commissioner, who is in turn assisted by an additional commissioner; three joint commissioners; two officers on special duty, one of whom also acts the head of department (HoD); a secretary; and two deputy election commissioners.

=== Uttar Pradesh State Election Commissioner ===
The Uttar Pradesh State Election Commissioner acts as the head of the state election commission. Usually a retired officer of the Indian Administrative Service (IAS), the commissioner is appointed by the governor of Uttar Pradesh on the chief minister's aid and advise and has the same immunity as a high court judge and therefore, can only be removed from office via impeachment by both houses of the Indian parliament. The commissioner has a tenure of six years or till she/he attains the age of 68, whichever is earlier. The commission is headed by the Uttar Pradesh State Election Commissioner, at present, Manoj Kumar.

== Bibliography ==
=== Book ===
- Thiruvengadamv, Arun K. (2018) [2017]. The Constitution of India: A Contextual Analysis (1st ed.). New Delhi: Bloomsbury Publishing. ISBN 978-93-87146-55-6. LCCN 2017042042.

=== Paper ===
- Rajan, Amitabh (March 2017). "Institutional Dynamics of Governance Reform in India (1991–2016)". Indian Journal of Public Administration. 63 (1): 41–62. doi:10.1177/0019556116689765. ISSN 0019-5561.
