= Madhya Pradesh State Election Commission =

Indian state agency

- मध्य प्रदेश राज्य निर्वाचन आयोग
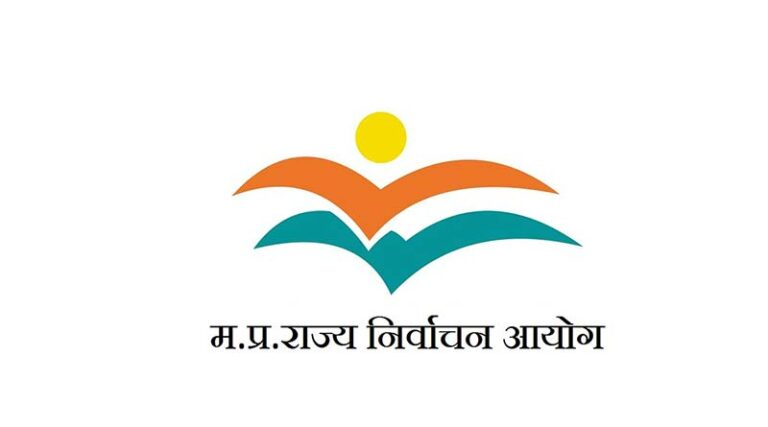

Agency overview
- Formed: 1 February 1994
- Jurisdiction: Madhya Pradesh
- Headquarters: 17, Arera Hills, Bhopal, Madhya Pradesh.
- Agency executives: Mr. Manoj Kumar Shrivastava., (Chief Election Commissioner); Mr.Abhishek Singh, (Secretary); Mr.Sukhveer Singh (Chief Electoral Officer), (CEO)
- Parent agency: Election Commission of India
- Website: mplocalelection.gov.in/.. ceomadhyapradesh.nic.in/..

The Madhya Pradesh State Election Commission is an autonomous and constitutional body constituted in Indian state of Madhya Pradesh for ensuring that elections in are conducted in free, fair and unbiased way. The Constitution of India with provisions as per Article 243K and 243 ZA and Article 324 ensures creation and safeguarding of the powers of State Election Commissions. The commission is responsible for conducting elections for urban local lodies like municipalities, municipal corporations, panchayats. The Madhya Pradesh State Election Commissioner is appointed by Governor of Madhya Pradesh.

== History and administration ==
The Madhya Pradesh State Election Commission was formed in accordance with powers of Election Commission of India, which was constituted 1950 to supervise state level elections. Its commissioner is appointed by Governor. To ensure the autonomy of the position, the commissioner cannot be removed from office except on the grounds and manner specified for judges of high courts.

== Powers and responsibilities ==
The Madhya Pradesh States Election Commissioner is responsible for:

- Releasing election schedules.
- Issuing notifications containing guidelines for conducting elections for municipal corporations.
- Conducting elections for municipal corporations.
- Issuing notification containing guidelines for conducting elections for municipal panchayats.
- Conducting elections for municipal panchayats.
- Laying guidelines for persons eligible to contest in elections for municipal corporations.
- Conducting elections for municipal panchayats.
- Model code of conduct in elections for local bodies.
- Updating electoral rolls.
- Declaring results of elections held for municipal corporations and municipal panchayats.
- Ordering repolls if needed.
- Making arrangements for statewide polls.
- Monitoring poll expenditures for panchayat polls.
- Laying guidelines for issuing of opinion polls.
- Decisions on conducting elections.
- Declaring results of local body polls.
- Municipal and panchayat constituencies delimitation exercise.
- Countermanding elections in case of malpractices.

== Composition ==
The Madhya Pradesh State Election Commission is headed by Chief Election Commissioner and as many members as specified in the state act. The commissioners are independent and must not hold positions or office in any central or state Government organisation.

Mr Manoj kumar shrivastav, is the current Chief Election Commissioner of Madhya Pradesh State Election Commission. His period of service is 6 years or attaining an age of 62 years, whichever is earlier.

== Constitutional requirements ==
The commission was formed after an amendment of the Constitution with 73rd and 74th declaration. State Election Commissions were formed as per Article 243K of the Constitution, similar to setting up of the Election Commission of India in Article 324.

== List of Election Commissioners of Madhya Pradesh ==
Election Commissioners of Madhya Pradesh
Name	Term
N. B. Lohani	15 February 1994 – 16 February 2000
Gopal Sharan Shukla	16 February 2000 – 14 August 2006
Aditya Vijay Singh	14 August 2006 – 10 December 2010
Ajit Raizada	10 December 2010 – 30 September 2013
R. Parshuram	1 October 2013 – 31 December 2018
Basant Pratap Singh	1 January 2019 – 31 December 2024
Manoj Kumar Shrivastava	1 January 2025 – present

== See also ==
- Election Commission of India
