= Bihar State Election Commission =

Electoral agency of Bihar, India

Agency overview
- Formed: 1966
- Jurisdiction: Bihar
- Headquarters: Sone Bhawan, 3rd Floor, Beerchand Patel Marg, Patna-800001
- Agency executive: Deepak Prasad., State Election Commissioner, Bihar.
- Website: sec.bihar.gov.in

Bihar State Election Commission is an autonomous and statutory body constituted in Indian state of Bihar for ensuring that elections are conducted in free, fair and unbiased way. Constitution of India with provisions as per Article 324 ensures creation and safeguarding of the powers of Election Commission. Bihar State Election Commission is responsible for conducting elections for Urban Local Bodies like Municipalities, Municipal Corporations, Panchayats and any other specified by Election Commission of India. Bihar State Election Commissioner is appointed by Governor of Bihar.

== History and Administration ==
Bihar State Election Commission was formed in accordance with powers of Election Commission of India, which was constituted in year 1950 to supervise state level elections. State election commissioner is appointed by Governor. To ensure the autonomy of the position, the Bihar state election commissioner cannot be removed from office except on the grounds and manner specified for judge of High Court.

Bihar State Election Commission had adopted bio-metric system of voter identification in the panchayat polls conducted during November 2021.

Bihar State Election Commission had partnered with Staqu, AI implementation enabler, to automate the vote counting for Panchayat elections held in November 2021.

== Powers and Responsibilities ==
Bihar States Election Commissioner is responsible for the following:

- Issue notification containing guidelines for conducting elections for Municipal Corporations in State
- Conducting elections for Municipal Corporations in State.
- Issue notification containing guidelines for conducting elections for conducting elections for Municipal panchayats in State.
- Conducting elections for Municipal panchayats in State
- Laying guidelines for persons eligible to contest in elections for Municipal Corporations in State.
- Conducting elections for Municipal panchayats in State.
- Model code of conduct are following in elections for local bodies.
- Updating Electoral rolls with new additions.
- Updating Electoral rolls with removals, if any.
- Declaration of results of elections held for Municipal Corporations in State.
- Declaration of results of elections held for Municipal panchayats in State.

== Composition ==
Bihar State Election Commission consists of Chief Elector Officer and as many members and staff specified as are required by the Acts of respective state Governments. State Election Commissioners are independent persons not holding position or office in any Central or State Government organisations.

Deepak Prasad, Retd IAS, is the Chief Electoral Officer of Bihar.

== Constitutional Requirements ==
Bihar State Election Commission was formed after amendment of Constitution with 73rd and 74th declaration. State Election Commissions were formed as per Article 243K of the Constitution, similar to setting up of Election commission of India as per Article 324.

== See also ==
- Election Commission of India
