= Chief Election Commissioner =

Chief Election Commissioner may refer to:

- Chief Election Commissioner of Bangladesh
- Chief Election Commissioner of India
- Chief Election Commissioner of Nepal
- Chief Election Commissioner of Pakistan

== See also ==
- Election Commission (disambiguation)
- Election Commissioner of India
