= Block pramukh =

Elected head of a Panchayat Samiti, local self government in india

Block Pramukh (transl. President of Block Panchayat) is a term used in India to refer to the elected head of a Panchayat Samiti or Block Panchayat, or equivalent body at the intermediate level of the Panchayati Raj system. The Panchayat samiti is a tier of the Panchayati raj system. It is a rural local government body at the Tehsil (block) level in India. It works for the villages of the tehsil that together are called a development block. The Panchayat Samiti is the link between the gram panchayat (village council) and the zila parishad (district panchayat or district board). There are a number of variations in the name of this institution in the various states. For example, it is known as Kshetra Panchayat in Uttar Pradesh, Mandal Parishad in Andhra Pradesh, Taluka Panchayat in Gujarat, Block Panchayat in Kerala, and Mandal Panchayat in Karnataka.

Block Pramukhs head the intermediate level of Panchayat Raj Institutions (or PRIs).

== Functions ==
- The Block Pramukh, or president of the Block Panchayat, heads the intermediate tier of the Panchayati Raj system, known as the Panchayat Samiti, although its name and structure vary among states.
- He or she presides over the meetings of the Panchayat Samiti or Block Council.
- He/She functions as the elected head of the concerned institution.

== Election ==
- The election of the Block Pramukh varies from state to state and is governed by the respective State Panchayati Raj Acts. Generally, the Block Pramukh is elected from among the elected members of the Panchayat Samiti.
