= Goa State Election Commission =

Electoral agency in India

Constitutional Body overview
- Formed: 1994
- Jurisdiction: Government of Goa
- Headquarters: Opposite Joggers' Park, Altinho, Panaji, Goa
- Constitutional Body executives: W. V. Ramanamurthy, IAS, (Retd.), State Election Commissioner; Brijesh Manerkar, Secretary, State Election Commissioner
- Website: Official Website

Goa State Election Commission is an autonomous and statutory body constituted in Indian state of Goa for ensuring that elections are conducted in free, fair and unbiased way. Constitution of India with provisions as per Article 243K and 243 ZA and Article 324 ensures creation and safeguarding of the powers of State Election Commissions. Goa State Election Commission is responsible for conducting elections for Urban Local Bodies like Municipalities, Municipal Corporations, Panchayats and any other specified by Election Commission of India. Goa State Election Commissioner is appointed by Governor of Goa.

== History ==
The State Election Commission of Goa was constituted pursuant to the 73rd and 74th Amendments to the Constitution of India, by amending the Goa Municipalities Act, 1969 and the Goa Panchayat Raj Act, 1993. To ensure the autonomy of the position, the Goa state election commissioner cannot be removed from office except on the grounds and manner specified for judge of High Court. Geeta Sagar, IAS served as the first State Election Commissioner.

== List of State Election Commissioners ==
S.No.	Name	From	To
1	Geeta Sagar, IAS	April 1, 1995	August 18, 1995
2	B.S. Subanna	October 26, 1995	August 14, 1997
3	S. D. Sadhale	September 11, 1997	April 28, 2004
4	P. M. Borkar	July 1, 2004	June 30, 2006
5	Dr. M. Modassir, IAS, (Retd.)	August 1, 2010	January 13, 2017
6	R. K. Srivastava, IAS, (Retd.)	January 14, 2017	October 30, 2020
7	Chokha Ram Garg, IAS	November 3, 2020	March 12, 2021
8	W. V. Ramanamurthy, IAS, (Retd.)	March 18, 2021	till date

== Powers and Responsibilities ==
Goa States Election Commissioner is responsible for the following:

- Issue notification containing guidelines for conducting elections for Municipal Corporations in State.
- Conducting elections for Municipal Corporations in State.
- Issue notification containing guidelines for conducting elections for conducting elections for Municipal panchayats in State.
- Conducting elections for Municipal panchayats in State.
- Laying guidelines for persons eligible to contest in elections for Municipal Corporations in State.
- Conducting elections for Municipal panchayats in State.
- Model code of conduct are following in elections for local bodies.
- Updating Electoral rolls with new additions.
- Updating Electoral rolls with removals, if any.
- Declaration of results of elections held for Municipal Corporations in State.
- Declaration of results of elections held for Municipal panchayats in State.
- Ordering repoll if needed.

== Composition ==
Goa State Election Commission is a one-man commission consisting of Chief Election Commissioner. State Election Commissioners are independent persons not holding position or office in any Central or State Government organisations.

Shree W V Ramanamurthy, Retd I.A.S., is the Chief Election Commissioner of Goa. His period of service will be 5 years or attaining an age of 65 years whichever is earlier.

== Constitutional Requirements ==
Goa State Election Commission was formed after amendment of Constitution with 73rd and 74th declaration. State Election Commissions were formed as per Article 243K of the Constitution, similar to setting up of Election commission of India as per Article 324.

== See also ==
Election Commission of India.
