= National Electoral Commission =

National Electoral Commission may refer to:

- National Electoral Commission (Angola)
- National Electoral Commission (Cape Verde)
- National Electoral Commission (Chad)
- National Electoral Commission (East Timor)
- National Electoral Commission of Iceland
- National Electoral Commission (Poland)
- Independent National Electoral Commission (Nigeria)
- National Electoral Commission (Rwanda)
- National Electoral Commission (Tanzania)
- National Electoral Commission (Somaliland)

== See also ==
- Election Commission (disambiguation)
- Independent National Electoral Commission (Guinea)
- Independent National Electoral Commission (Democratic Republic of the Congo)
