= Election Committee (disambiguation) =

Election Committee usually refers to the Election Committee of Hong Kong.

Election Committee may also refer to:

- Election Committee (constituency), Hong Kong
  - 2001 Election Committee (Legislative Council constituency) by-election
- Election Committee (Parliament of Norway)
- Electoral board (works council)

== See also ==
- Election Commission (disambiguation)
