= Panchayat samiti =

Rural local government body in India

Panchayat samiti or block panchayat is a rural local government (panchayat) body at the intermediate block level or tehsil (taluka/mandal) level in India. It works for the villages of the block that together are called a development block. It has been said to be the "panchayat of panchayats".

The 73rd Amendment defines the levels of panchayati raj institution as :

- District level
- Intermediate level
- Base level

The panchayat samiti is the link between the gram panchayat (village council) and the zila parishad (district council). The name varies across states: mandal parishad in Andhra Pradesh, taluka panchayat in Gujarat, mandal panchayat or taluk panchayat in Karnataka, block panchayat in Kerala, panchayat union in Tamil Nadu, janpad panchayat in Madhya Pradesh, Panchayat Samiti in Rajasthan, anchalik panchayat in Assam.

In India, local self-government bodies exist at the intermediary level and are known by different names in different states. For example, in Kerala, they are called "block panchayats," while in other states, they may be referred to as "panchayat samiti," "mandal parishad," "taluka panchayat," "janpad panchayat," "panchayat union", or "anchalik panchayat." These bodies are responsible for providing various services to the people in their respective areas, such as sanitation, healthcare, education, and infrastructure.

== Composition ==
The Panchayat Samiti is divided into territorial constituencies, each represented by a directly elected member, who collectively form the Panchayat Samiti council. The samiti is elected for five years and is headed by a chairperson/president and deputy chairperson/vice president elected by the members of the panchayat samiti.

The Block Development Officer / Secretary is the executive officer of the Panchayat Samiti, appointed by the state government, and is assisted by sectoral development officers.

It acts as a coordinating body between district panchayat and gram panchayat.

=== Elected Members ===
- Chairperson / President of the Panchayat Samiti (directly or indirectly elected)
- Vice Chairperson / Vice President of the Panchayat Samiti
- Chairpersons of the various standing committee
- Elected members from constituencies

=== Ex-Officio Members ===
Typically, a block panchayat is composed of elected members of the area: the block development officer, members of the state's legislative assembly, members of parliament belonging to that area, otherwise unrepresented groups (Scheduled Castes, Scheduled Tribes and women), associate members (such as a farmer, a representative of the cooperative societies and one from the agricultural marketing services sector) and the elected members of that panchayat block (tehsil) on the zila parishad (district board), chairpersons/presidents of gram panchayats in the block.

One sarpanch samiti supervises the other gram panchayats.

=== Composition of mandal parishads in Andhra Pradesh and Telangana ===
A coterminous mandal parishad is constituted for each revenue mandal. A mandal parishad is composed of:

- Mandal parishad territorial constituency members
- Members of the state legislative assembly having jurisdiction over the mandal
- Members of the House of the People having jurisdiction over the mandal
- Members of the Council of States who are voters in the mandal
- One co-opted member, belonging to minorities

Mandal Parishad Territorial Constituency (MPTC) members are directly elected by the voters, whereas the mandal president is elected by the MPTC members. The members are elected for a term of five years. The election to MPTCs is done on a party basis. The elections are conducted by the state election commission.

The sarpanch are permanent invitees to the mandal parishad meetings.

== Departments ==
The most common departments found in a panchayat samiti are:

- Administration
- Finance
- Public works (especially water and roads)
- Agriculture
- Health
- Education teacher list
- Social welfare
- Information technology
- Women & child development
- Panchayat raj (mandal praja parishad)

Each department in a panchayat samiti has its own officer. Most often these are state government employees acting as extension officers, but occasionally in more revenue-rich panchayat samiti, they may be local employees. A government-appointed Block Development Officer (BDO) is the supervisor of the extension officers and executive officer to the panchayat samiti and becomes, in effect, its administrative chief.

== Functions ==
The panchayat samiti collects all the prospective plans prepared at gram panchayat level and processes them for funding and implementation by evaluating them from the angles of financial constraints, social welfare, and area development. It also identifies and prioritizes the issues that should be addressed at the block level.

== Sources of income ==
The income of the panchayat samiti comes from:

- Land and water use taxes, professional taxes, liquor taxes and others
- Income-generating programmes
- Grants-in-aid and loans from the state government and the local zila parishad
- Voluntary contributions

For many panchayat samiti, the main source of income is state-aid. For others, the traditional taxing function provides the bulk of revenues. Tax revenues are often shared between the gram panchayats and the panchayat samiti.
