= Andhra Pradesh State Election Commission =

Electoral agency in India

- Official emblem of the electoral commission

Agency overview
- Formed: 17 June 1994
- Jurisdiction: Andhra Pradesh
- Headquarters: 1st Floor, New HODs Building, Opposite Indira Gandhi Municipal Stadium, M. G. Road, Vijayawada, Andhra Pradesh – 520010
- Agency executive: Anil Chandra Punetha, State Election Commissioner
- Website: sec.ap.gov.in

The Andhra Pradesh State Election Commission (APSEC) is a constitutional authority in the Indian state of Andhra Pradesh. It was established under the provisions of Articles 243-K and 243-ZA of the Constitution of India, which empower State Election Commissions to direct, control, and conduct elections to the local bodies. The Commission was constituted under the Andhra Pradesh Panchayat Raj Act, 1994.

== History ==
The Andhra Pradesh State Election Commission was formed on 17 June 1994. The 1st Local body elections to Municipalities and Panchayat Raj Institutions were held in March 1995. The 2nd and 3rd Local Body elections were held in 2000-2001 and 2005-2006 respectively. The 4th ordinary elections to Gram Panchayats were held in July 2013. The 4th ordinary elections to Municipalities were held in March 2014 and to those of MPTCs and ZPTCs in April 2014.

Consequent on the bifurcation of the State, the Government of Andhra Pradesh constituted a State Election Commission for the State of Andhra Pradesh on 30 January 2016.

== Organisation ==
The Commission is headed by the State Election Commissioner, who is appointed by the Governor of Andhra Pradesh on the recommendation of the state government. The appointee must be a person holding or having held an office not lower in rank than that of a Principal Secretary to the Government.

The current Andhra Pradesh State Election Commissioner is Anil Chandra Punetha, a retired IAS officer.

== Functions ==
Elections to the Rural and Urban bodies of Andhra Pradesh are held by both direct and indirect elections. The sole controlling authority rests on the Andhra Pradesh State Election Commission.

The A.P. State Election Commission adopts the Assembly Electoral Rolls prepared under the supervision of the Chief Electoral Officer, General Administration (Elections) Department (who is the representative of the Election Commission of India in the State) for preparation of ward-wise electoral rolls for conduct of elections to Rural and Urban Local Bodies in the State. Polling stations are identified based on the rolls. Once the pre-election exercises such as delimitation and reservation of seats and offices in local bodies are completed and communicated by the State Government, the State Election Commission issues Notification for conduct of elections.

=== Direct elections ===
Elections to the following posts are held by this Commission by Direct election.

- Rural Local Bodies :
1. Members of the Zilla Parishad Territorial Constituency (ZPTC).
2. Members of the Mandal Parishad Territorial Constituency (MPTC).
3. Sarpanch of the Gram Panchayat.
4. Ward Member of Gram Panchayat.
- Urban Local Bodies :

The Urban Local Bodies consist of Municipal Corporations, Municipalities and Nagar Panchayats.

1. Corporators / Ward Members of Municipal Corporation.
2. Councillors / Ward Members of Municipality / Nagar Panchayat.

=== Indirect elections ===
Indirect elections are held for the following positions: After taking oath by the directly elected Members, indirect elections are held as per the date and time appointed by the Commission in the respective local bodies.

- Rural Local Bodies :
1. Upa-Sarpanch of Gram Panchayat.
2. President and Vice-President of Mandal Praja Parishad.
3. Chairperson and Vice-Chairperson of Zilla Praja Parishad.
- Urban Local Bodies :
1. Mayor and Deputy Mayor of Municipal Corporation.
2. Chairperson and Vice-Chairperson of Municipalities.
