= District council (India) =

Third and highest tier of the Panchayati Raj system of local governance

District Council (Zilla Parishad)
- Also known as: Zilla Parishad, District Panchayat, Zilla Panchayat
- Level of government: District (Rural local government)
- Part of: Panchayati Raj System
- Constituting instrument: 73rd Constitutional Amendment Act, 1992; State legislation
- Jurisdiction: Entire district (except urban areas/municipal areas)
- Constituencies / Wards: Each district divided into territorial constituencies (number varies by population and state law)
- Head: President
- Deputy Head: Vice president
- Administrative officer (Secretary): Chief Executive Officer (IAS/State Civil Service)
- Term length: 5 years
- Voting system: First-past-the-post

The Zila Panchayat, also known as the District Development Council, Zilla Parishad, or District Panchayat, is the district-level tier of the Panchayati Raj system in India. It is an elected local government body representing the rural areas of a district, with its composition, powers and functions determined by state legislation. It is generally headed by a president or chairperson, elected from among its members, and assisted by a vice-president or deputy chairperson. Its administrative functions are carried out by an executive officer or secretary appointed by the state government. The Zila Panchayat coordinates rural development functions at the district level and works with the intermediate- and village-level Panchayati Raj institutions.

The 73rd constitutional amendment concerns governments' (also known as Panchayati Raj Institutions

- Panchayat at District (or apex) Level
- Panchayat at Intermediate Level
- Panchayat at Base Level

== Composition ==
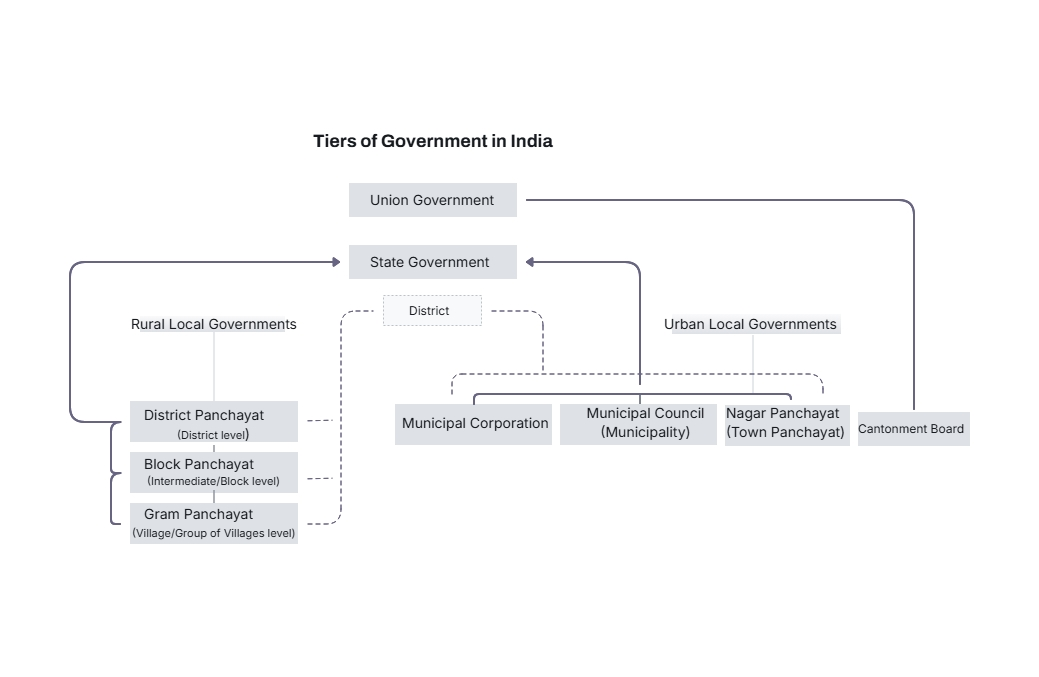
Administrative structure of India

The composition of a Zilla Parishad varies among states and is determined by the respective state Panchayati Raj laws. It consists of elected members representing territorial constituencies/wards, along with such ex-officio members as prescribed by state legislation. The Zilla Parishad is headed by a president or chairperson, assisted by a vice-president or deputy chairperson. It may also establish standing committees to oversee specific areas of its responsibilities.

The rural area under a Zilla Parishad is generally divided into territorial constituencies, from which members are elected by the electorate. The chairpersons/presidents or heads of intermediate-level Panchayats (Panchayat Samitis), members of legislative assembly, members of parliament may also be included as ex-officio members, where provided by state law.

The administrative matters of the Zilla Parishad are generally managed by a chief executive officer or an officer holding an equivalent designation, appointed in accordance with state law. The officer oversees the implementation of the Zilla Parishad's decisions, development projects and administrative functions, with the assistance of other district-level officials.

== Election ==
Elections to the Zila Parishad are generally held every five years, in accordance with the respective state Panchayati Raj Acts. The Zilla Parishad is divided into territorial constituencies known as wards or divisions, from which members are directly elected by voters. The president/chairperson and vice-president/vice chairperson are generally elected from among the elected members, in accordance with state legislation. The term of the elected members and office-bearers is generally five years.

Elections to Zila Parishads are conducted by the respective State Election Commissions. Eligibility to vote and contest elections is governed by respective state laws.

== Administrative structure ==
The chief executive officer (CEO), who is a civil servant under IAS or State Administrative Service cadre, heads the administrative machinery of the Zila Parishad. He is also nominated by the government. He may also be district magistrate in some states. The CEO supervises the divisions of the parishad and executes its development schemes.In some states, like Kerala, the chief executive officer of the District Panchayat is known as the secretary.This provision is by the 73rd Amendment Act, 1992.

== Function ==
The exact powers and functions of Zilla Parishads vary among states and are generally specified in the respective state Panchayat Acts and the Eleventh Schedule to the Constitution of India.

District Panchayats are responsible for district-level planning and the implementation of programmes for economic development and social justice. It functions mostly through various Standing Committees, which oversee and coordinate the common programmes of the villages under its jurisdiction. Their functions generally include:

1. preparing district development plans and coordinating rural development activities;
2. implementing programmes relating to agriculture, rural development, education, health, sanitation, infrastructure and social welfare;
3. prepare plans for economic development and social justice.
4. implementing schemes and programmes entrusted to them by the state or central government.
5. providing and maintaining district-level infrastructure and public utilities assigned to them;
6. It advises the State Government on all matters relating to the Gram Panchayats and Panchayat Samitis under its supervision and the needs of the rural population living therein.
7. It also supervises the work of the Panchayats. It also scrutinizes the budget estimates of Panchayat Samitis in some states like Assam, Bihar and Punjab.

== Sources of income ==
- Taxes, fees and charges (Own source revenues) –
  - taxes on water, pilgrimage, markets, etc.
- Grants from the State Government
  - Fixed grant from the State Government in proportion with the land revenue and money for works and schemes assigned to the Parishad.
- Grants from the Central Government
  - Funds received through schemes and grants, including Finance Commission grants.
- Scheme funds –
  - Funds received for implementing Central and State government development programmes
- Other receipts –
  - Donations, contributions, interest income, penalties and other receipts authorised by law.

== See also ==
- Gram panchayat
