= Governor (India) =

Head of state of the states of India

Governor of Indian States
- State Emblem of India

- Flag of India
- Style: His/Her Excellency; The Honourable
- Residence: Lok Bhavan
- Appointer: President of India
- Term length: 5 years
- Salary: ₹500,000 (US$5,300) (incl. allowances) per month

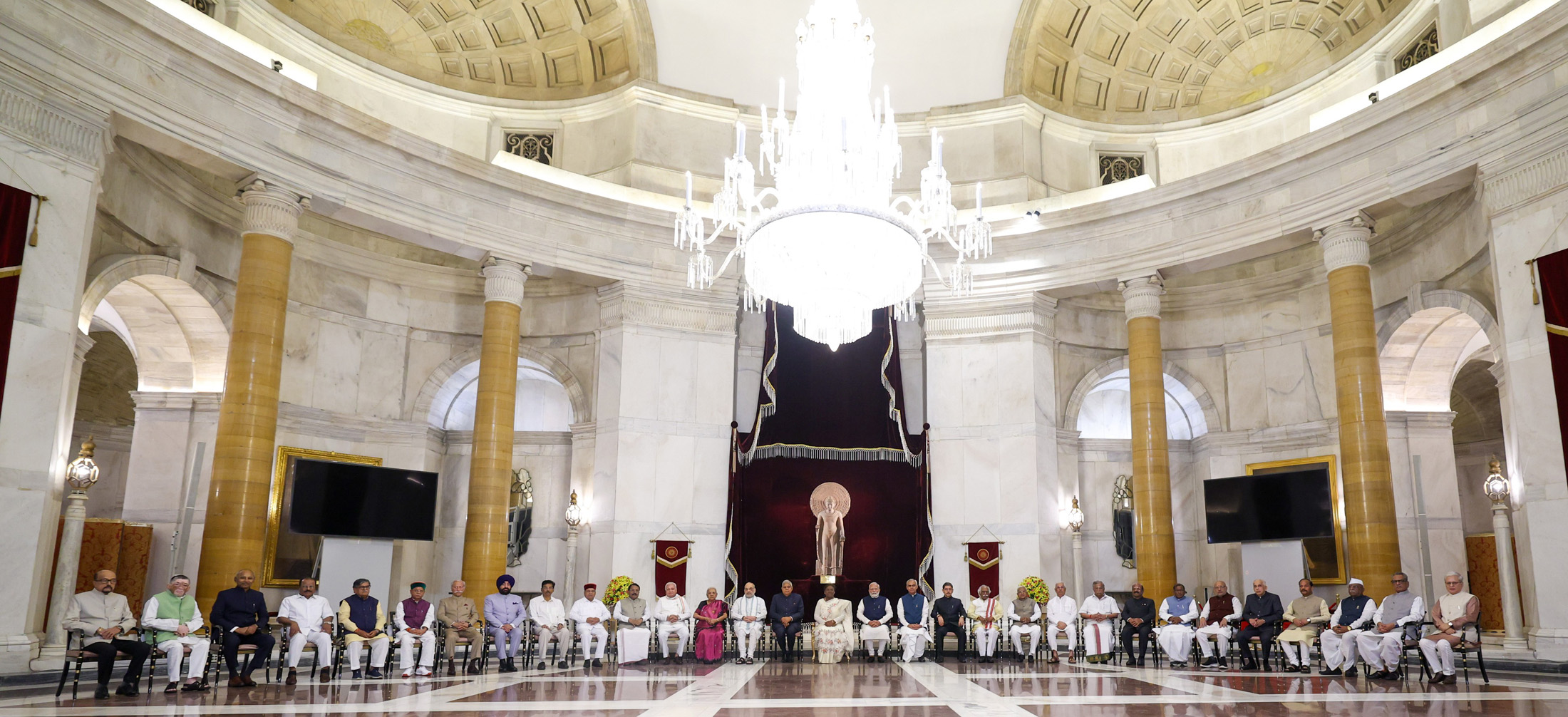
Several governors, lieutenant governors and administrators at the 2024 governors conference on 1–2 August 2024.

In India, a governor is the constitutional head of state in each of the Indian states and has powers and functions at the state level similar to those of the President of India at the central level. A governor acts as the constitutional head and takes all their decisions based on the advice of chief minister and their council of ministers. The rank of each governor (within their respective state) in India is 4th in the Order of precedence of India.

A lieutenant governor is the constitutional head of five of the eight union territories. They rank 11th in the order of precedence in India. The lieutenant governor is appointed by the President of India for a term of five years, and holds office at the President's pleasure. Since the union territories of Delhi, Jammu and Kashmir and Puducherry have a measure of self-government with an elected legislature and council of ministers, the role of the lieutenant governor there is mostly a ceremonial one, akin to that of a state's governor. In Andaman and Nicobar Islands and Ladakh, however, the lieutenant governor holds more power, being both the head of state and head of government.

== Qualifications, appointment and term of office ==
=== Qualifications ===
Article 157 and Article 158 of the Constitution of India specify eligibility requirements for the post of governor. They are as follows:

A governor:

- must be at least 35 years of age.
- should not be a member of the either house of the parliament or house of the state legislature.
- should not hold any office of profit.

Traditionally, governors are not appointed to lead the states where they reside, although this is not stipulated in the constitution.

=== Appointment ===
The President of India appoints the governor of each State. The factors based on which the candidates are evaluated is not mentioned in the Constitution.

A same person can be appointed as the governor of two or more States.

=== Term of office ===
A governor shall stay appointed during the pleasure of the President. This alternative assumption is that they are appointed after the 'council of ministers' advise the President for such appointment. Hence, it is the Central Government that appoints them. They shall remain in office until the expiration of five years from the date on which they were appointed. They shall continue to remain in office even after the expiration of 5 years, until a governor is appointed by the President.

== Powers and functions ==
The primary function of the governor is to preserve, protect and defend the constitution and the law as incorporated in their oath of office under Article 159 of the Indian constitution in the administration of the state affairs. All the governor's actions, recommendations and supervisory powers (Article 167c, Article 200, Article 213, Article 355, etc.) over the executive and legislative entities of a state shall be used to implement the provisions of the Constitution.

Unlike the President of India, the governor has no military or diplomatic powers. However, they possess legislative, executive and judicial powers that are similar to the powers of the President.

A governor has different types of powers:

1. Executive powers related to administration, appointments and removals,
2. Legislative powers related to lawmaking and the state legislature, that is State Legislative Assembly (Vidhan Sabha/Saasana Sabha) or State Legislative Council (Vidhan Parishad/Saasana Mandali),
3. Judicial Powers related to grant of pardons, reprieves, etc. and consultations.
4. Discretionary powers to be carried out according to the discretion of the governor. The governors of India have similar powers and functions of the state level as those of the president of India at central level.

=== Executive powers ===
- The Constitution vests in the governor all the executive powers of the state government.
- The governor appoints the chief minister, who enjoys the support of the majority in the State Legislative Assembly. The governor also appoints the other members of the Council of Ministers and distributes portfolios to them on the advice of the chief minister.
- The Council of Ministers remain in power during the 'pleasure' of the governor. However, if the governor reports a constitutional breakdown in a State to the President, and that report confirms the statement that a State Government is not following the principles of the Constitution, the President can proclaim the emergency provisions in such State. This will dismiss the council of ministers as such in that State.
- The governor appoints the chief minister of a state, the advocate general and the chairman and members of the State Public Service Commission.
- A state election commissioner is also appointed by the governor (though removed by the president).
- When requested by the Election Commission or Regional Commissioner, the governor or the President shall make available to them the required staff for their proper functioning.
- All executive actions in a State are carried on the governor's name.
- The governor of the state by virtue of their office is also the chancellor of most of the universities in the state. The dignity and impartiality of the office of the chancellor puts the governor in a unique position with regard to protecting the autonomy of the universities and saving them from undue political interference. The governor as chancellor of universities also acts as president of the Senate. The governor has the power to direct inspection of every component of the universities and affiliated colleges, required due action on the result of inquiry. The chancellor appoints search committee for appointments of vice chancellor. The governor accords consent of warrant of degrees and withdraws degree or distinctions both at the recommendations of the Senate. The governor approves or disapproves statutes passed by the Senate and appoints teachers at the university based on the recommendation of the respective committees.
- The Governor can make rules regulating the recruitment, and the conditions of service of persons appointed as the secretarial staff of the Assembly or the council after consultation with the Speaker of the Legislative Assembly or the Chairman of the Legislative Council. However, Governor can appoint such people if the State Legislature has not prescribed any laws regulating the above recruitment.
- A governor can nominate one member of the Anglo-Indian community to their State's Legislative Assembly, if he/she is of the opinion that they are not represented properly in the Assembly.
- A governor has the power to nominate 1/6 of the total no. of members to the Legislative Council of a State having special knowledge or practical experience in respect of Literature, science, art, co-operative movement and social service.

=== Legislative powers ===
- The governor has the right to address and send message, summon, prorogue and dissolve the State Legislature. These powers are formal, and the governor's use of these powers must comply with the advice of the Council of Ministers headed by the chief minister.
- He/She also has the power to either himself/herself or through other lay down the Annual Financial Statement before the Houses of the State Legislature and make demands for grants and recommending Money Bills.
- The governor inaugurates (to dedicate) the state legislature by addressing it after the assembly elections and also at the beginning of the first session every year.
- The governor's address on these occasions generally outlines new policies of the state government. A bill that the state legislature has passed, can become a law only after the governor gives assent. The governor can return a bill to the state legislature, if it is not a money bill, for reconsideration. However, if the state legislature sends it back to the governor for the second time, the Governor shall not withhold their assent therefrom. This has rarely happened in the history of any of the states. Tamil Nadu, for example, resent its NEET Exemption Bill to its governor for the first and only time ever, in 2022, since the state's formation in 1950.
- The governor also has the power to reserve certain bills for the president.
- When the state legislature is not in session and the governor considers it necessary to have a law, then the governor can promulgate ordinances. These ordinances are submitted to the state legislature at its next session. They remain valid for no more than six weeks from the date the state legislature is reconvened unless approved by it earlier.
- A Governor can disqualify a member of the State legislature when the election commission recommends that such member is no longer complying with provisions of Article 191.
- The governor can ask the advocate general to attend the proceedings of both houses of the state legislature and report to them any unlawful functioning if any.

=== Judicial powers ===
- The Governor has the power to grant pardons, respites, reprieves or remission of punishments or to suspend, remit or commute the sentence of any person convicted of any offence against any law relating to a matter to which executive power of a State extends.
- The President appoints the judges of the High Courts on the recommendation of the governor.
- He/She also has the power to appoint the judges of the district courts after consulting the High Court of that State.

=== Discretionary powers ===
- When no party gets a clear majority, the governor has discretion to choose a candidate for chief minister who will put together a majority coalition as soon as possible.
- They can impose president's rule.
- They submit reports on their own to the president or on the direction of the president regarding the affairs of the state.
- They can withhold their assent to a bill and send it to the president for approval.
- During emergency rule as per Article 353 , the governor can override the advice of the council of ministers if specifically permitted by the president.

=== Emergency powers ===
The governor has no role or powers in an emergency situation to meet with the external aggression or armed rebellion as the President unless specifically permitted by the president under articles 160, 356 and 357.

== Emoluments/Payment ==
On 1 February 2018, the Government of India decided to give ₹3,50,000 which is equivalent to ₹4,70,00 or US$5,500 in 2023 to governors.

Various emoluments, allowances and privileges available to a governor are determined by the Governors (Emoluments, Allowances and Privileges) Act, 1982.

In addition to the monthly salary, the governor and their family is entitled to-

- rent free official residence,
- free household facilities,
- leave allowances,
- conveyance, to use without payment of rent or hire, such number of motor-vehicles.
- medical treatment,
- travelling allowances,
- allowances for renewing furnishings and for maintenance of official residences,
- entertainment allowance, hospitality grant, household establishment expenses, office expenses, allowance for miscellaneous expenses, and tour expenses
- and such other expenses as approved from the President.

== Removal ==
A governor holds their office till five years, but it can be terminated earlier by two ways:

1. Dismissal by the president without assigning any reason, at whose pleasure the governor holds office. This alternative assumption is that he/she can be removed if the 'council of ministers' advice the President for such dismissal. Hence, it is the Central Government that can remove him/her. However, it is the duty of the president to dismiss a governor whose acts are upheld by courts as unconstitutional and malafide.
2. Resignation by the governor.

The Constitution does not lay out any specific reasons for removal of a Governor from their office. However, this power may be used in events like bribery, treason, corruption or/and violation of the constitution.

== Legal immunity ==
Under Article 361 of the constitution, governor cannot be summoned for questioning except on their voluntary willingness to testify in the court in support of their controversial deeds though the unconstitutional decisions taken by the governor would be declared invalid by the courts. The case would be decided by the courts based on the facts furnished by the union government for the governor's role.

As clarified by the Supreme Court in the case Rameshwar Prasad & Ors vs. Union of India & ANR, though governor cannot be prosecuted and imprisoned during their tenure, the governor can be prosecuted after stepping down from the post for the guilt committed during their term of governorship as declared earlier by the courts.

== Analysis of role in Government ==
While the President of India is "elected", the governor is "selected" by the incumbent central government. That is why there have been many instances when governors appointed by a previous government are removed by an incoming government. The reasons are more political.

The supreme court has ruled that governors should be given security of term, but this is generally not adhered to.

Political observers have described governorship as "plush old age homes" wherein the governor does not stay impartial and act against popular state leaders. In 1984, Congressman Thakur Ram Lal dismissed the N. T. Rama Rao government and allowed N. Bhaskara Rao as chief minister of Andhra Pradesh for 31 days.

In January 2014, the Central Bureau of Investigation (CBI) approached the Union Law Ministry under the UPA Government to record statements of West Bengal governor M. K. Narayanan and Goa Governor Bharat Vir Wanchoo. Their statements were considered vital as Narayanan was National Security Adviser and Wanchoo was Chief of Special Protection Group (SPG) at the time of signing of contract with AgustaWestland. Their views were also considered before Indian Government signed the contract with Agusta Westland. However, Union Law ministry stonewalled CBI probe by rejecting CBI's request to examine them claiming they had 'immunity'.

UPA was defeated in the 2014 general election and with the incoming NDA Government's permission, then West Bengal governor M. K. Narayanan became the first ever governor to be questioned by police in a criminal case. The CBI questioned M. K. Narayanan as a "witness" in ₹ 3600-crore 2013 Indian helicopter bribery scandal. The CBI said then Goa governor Bharat Vir Wanchoo would be questioned in the same case. then Arunachal Pradesh governor, Jyoti P Rajkhowa who is also appointed by the ruling party at the center, has been sacked by the president after the Supreme Court has quashed his unconstitutional acts.

== Oath ==
=== Oath (governor) ===
"I ..... (name of the governor), do swear in the name of God/solemnly affirm that I will faithfully execute the office of Governor (or discharge the functions of the Governor) of .............(name of the State) and will to the best of my ability preserve, protect and defend the Constitution and the law and that I will devote myself to the service and well-being of the people of ...........(name of the State)."

=== Oath (lieutenant governor) ===
"I ..... (name of the lieutenant governor), do swear in the name of God/solemnly affirm that I will faithfully execute the office of Lieutenant Governor (or discharge the functions of the Lieutenant Governor) of .............(name of the Union Territory) and will to the best of my ability preserve, protect and defend the Constitution and the law and that I will devote myself to the service and well-being of the people of ...........(name of the Union Territory)."

=== Oath (administrators) ===
Future Administrators are required to say the below oath aloud.

I..... [name of the Administrator], do swear in the name of God/solemnly affirm that I will faithfully execute the office of Lieutenant Governor [or discharge the functions of the Administrator] of [name of the Union Territory] and will to the best of my ability preserve, protect and defend the Constitution and the law and that I will devote myself to the service and well-being of the people of [name of the Union Territory]."

== List of incumbent governors ==
State	List	Portrait	Officeholder	Assumed office (tenure length)	Appointed By	Chief Minister
Andhra Pradesh	List		Syed Abdul Nazeer	24 February 2023 (3 years, 264 days)	Droupadi Murmu	N. Chandrababu Naidu
Arunachal Pradesh	List		Kaiwalya Trivikram Parnaik	16 February 2023 (3 years, 272 days)	Droupadi Murmu	Pema Khandu
Assam	List		Lakshman Acharya	30 July 2024 (2 years, 108 days)	Droupadi Murmu	Himanta Biswa Sarma
Bihar	List		Syed Ata Hasnain	14 March 2026 (246 days)	Droupadi Murmu	Samrat Choudhary
Chhattisgarh	List		Ramen Deka	31 July 2024 (2 years, 107 days)	Droupadi Murmu	Vishnu Deo Sai
Goa	List		Ashok Gajapati Raju	26 July 2025 (1 year, 112 days)	Droupadi Murmu	Pramod Sawant
Gujarat	List		Acharya Devvrat	22 July 2019 (7 years, 116 days)	Ram Nath Kovind	Bhupendrabhai Patel
Haryana	List		Ashim Kumar Ghosh	21 July 2025 (1 year, 117 days)	Droupadi Murmu	Nayab Singh Saini
Himachal Pradesh	List		Kavinder Gupta	10 March 2026 (250 days)	Droupadi Murmu	Sukhvinder Singh Sukhu
Jharkhand	List		Santosh Kumar Gangwar	31 July 2024 (2 years, 107 days)	Droupadi Murmu	Hemant Soren
Karnataka	List		Sudha Yadav	16 October 2026 (30 days)	Droupadi Murmu	D. K. Shivakumar
Kerala	List		Om Prakash Mathur	23 October 2026 (23 days)	Droupadi Murmu	V. D. Satheesan
Madhya Pradesh	List		Mangubhai C. Patel	8 July 2021 (5 years, 130 days)	Ram Nath Kovind	Mohan Yadav
Maharashtra	List		Jishnu Dev Varma	10 March 2026 (250 days)	Droupadi Murmu	Devendra Fadnavis
Manipur	List		Ajay Kumar Bhalla	3 January 2025 (1 year, 316 days)	Droupadi Murmu	Yumnam Khemchand Singh
Meghalaya	List		C. H. Vijayashankar	30 July 2024 (2 years, 108 days)	Droupadi Murmu	Conrad Sangma
Mizoram	List		V. K. Singh	16 January 2025 (1 year, 303 days)	Droupadi Murmu	Lalduhoma
Nagaland	List		Nand Kishore Yadav	13 March 2026 (247 days)	Droupadi Murmu	Neiphiu Rio
Odisha	List		Braj Mohan Ram	18 October 2026 (28 days)	Droupadi Murmu	Mohan Charan Majhi
Punjab	List		Gulab Chand Kataria	31 July 2024 (2 years, 107 days)	Droupadi Murmu	Bhagwant Mann
Rajasthan	List		Haribhau Bagade	31 July 2024 (2 years, 107 days)	Droupadi Murmu	Bhajan Lal Sharma
Sikkim	List		Dushyant Kumar Gautam	19 October 2026 (27 days)	Droupadi Murmu	Prem Singh Tamang
Tamil Nadu	List		Rajendra Arlekar	12 March 2026 (248 days)	Droupadi Murmu	C. Joseph Vijay
Telangana	List		Shiv Pratap Shukla	11 March 2026 (249 days)	Droupadi Murmu	A. Revanth Reddy
Tripura	List		N. Indrasena Reddy	26 October 2023 (3 years, 20 days)	Droupadi Murmu	Manik Saha
Uttar Pradesh	List		Anandiben Patel	29 July 2019 (7 years, 109 days)	Ram Nath Kovind	Yogi Adityanath
Uttarakhand	List		Dhal Singh Bisen	19 October 2026 (27 days)	Droupadi Murmu	Pushkar Singh Dhami
West Bengal	List		R. N. Ravi	12 March 2026 (248 days)	Droupadi Murmu	Suvendu Adhikari

== List of incumbent lieutenant governors and administrators ==
Union Territories	List	Portrait	Officeholder	Took office (term length)	Appointed by	Chief Ministers
Lieutenant Governors
Andaman and Nicobar Islands	List		Dinesh Sharma	15 September 2026 (61 days)	Droupadi Murmu	No legislature
National Capital Territory of Delhi	List		Taranjit Singh Sandhu	11 March 2026 (249 days)	Droupadi Murmu	Rekha Gupta
Jammu and Kashmir	List		Manoj Sinha	7 August 2020 (6 years, 100 days)	Ram Nath Kovind	Omar Abdullah
Ladakh	List		Vinai Kumar Saxena	13 March 2026 (247 days)	Droupadi Murmu	No legislature
Puducherry	List		Kuniyil Kailashnathan	7 August 2024 (2 years, 100 days)	Droupadi Murmu	N. Rangaswamy
Administrators
Chandigarh (Note: Since 1985, the Governor of Punjab also serves as the ex- officio Administrator of Chandigarh)	List		Gulab Chand Kataria	31 July 2024 (2 years, 107 days)	Droupadi Murmu	No legislature
Dadra and Nagar Haveli and Daman and Diu	List		Praful Khoda Patel	26 January 2020 (6 years, 293 days)	Ram Nath Kovind	No legislature
Lakshadweep	List		Praful Khoda Patel (additional Charge)	5 December 2020 (5 years, 345 days)	Ram Nath Kovind	No legislature

== See also ==
1. Chief Minister (India)
2. List of current Indian opposition leaders
3. List of current Indian legislative speakers and chairpersons
