= Municipal governance in India =

Urban self-governance in India

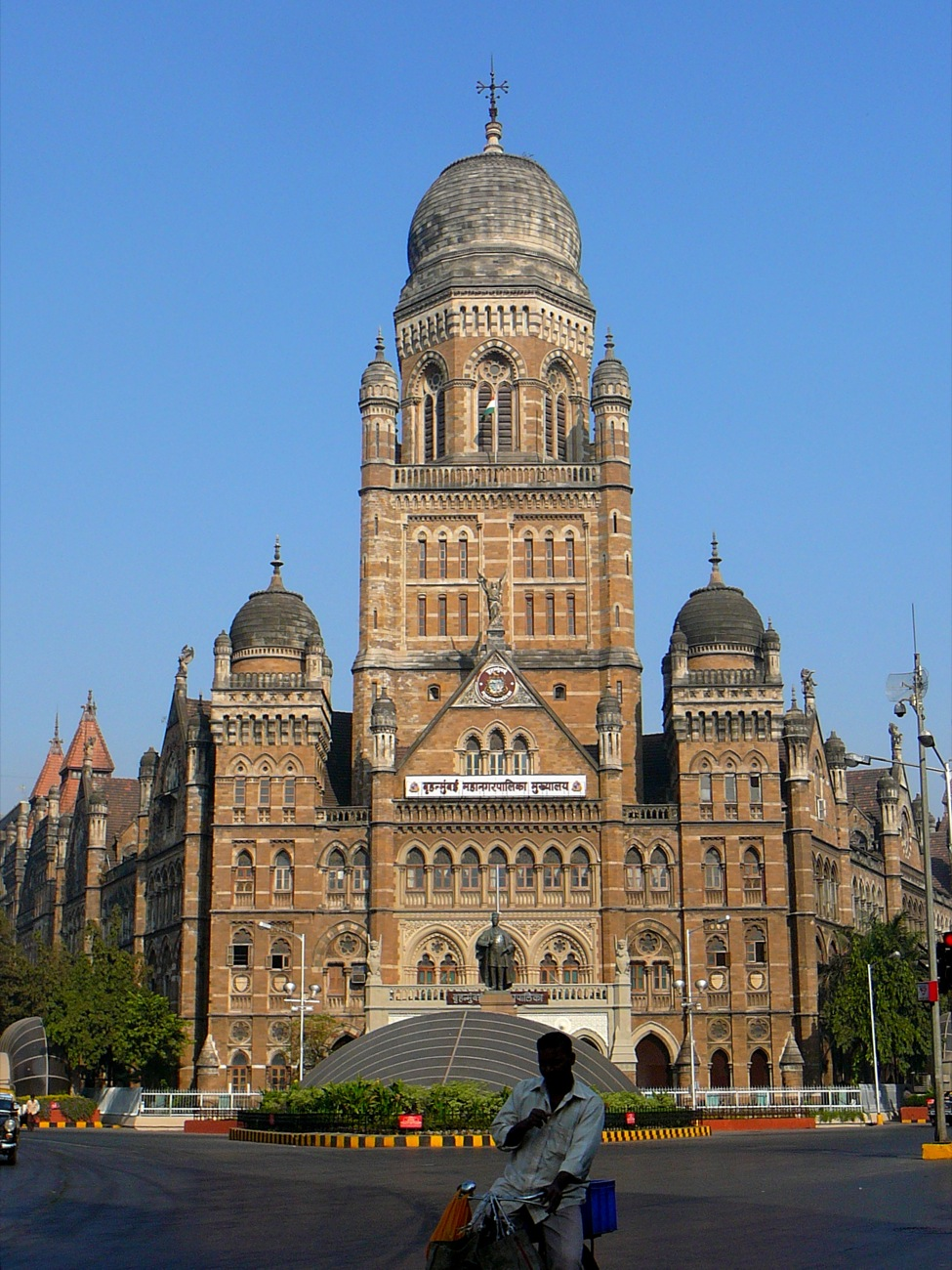
Brihanmumbai Municipal Corporation in Mumbai

In India, the Urban Local Bodies (ULBs), also called municipalities, are self-government institutions responsible for the administration of cities, towns, and transitional areas within a state or Union Territory. The 74th amendment to the Constitution of India in 1992 provided constitutional framework for the establishment of Urban Local Bodies.

There are three types of Urban Local Bodies in India, which include municipal corporations governing large urban areas, municipal councils governing smaller urban areas, and nagar panchayats governing transitional areas from rural to urban. They are established by individual state governments and can differ in names, election method, or tier structure. The classification of these areas is at the discretion of the states, considering factors such as total population, population density, non-agricultural employment, annual revenue generation, among other criteria.

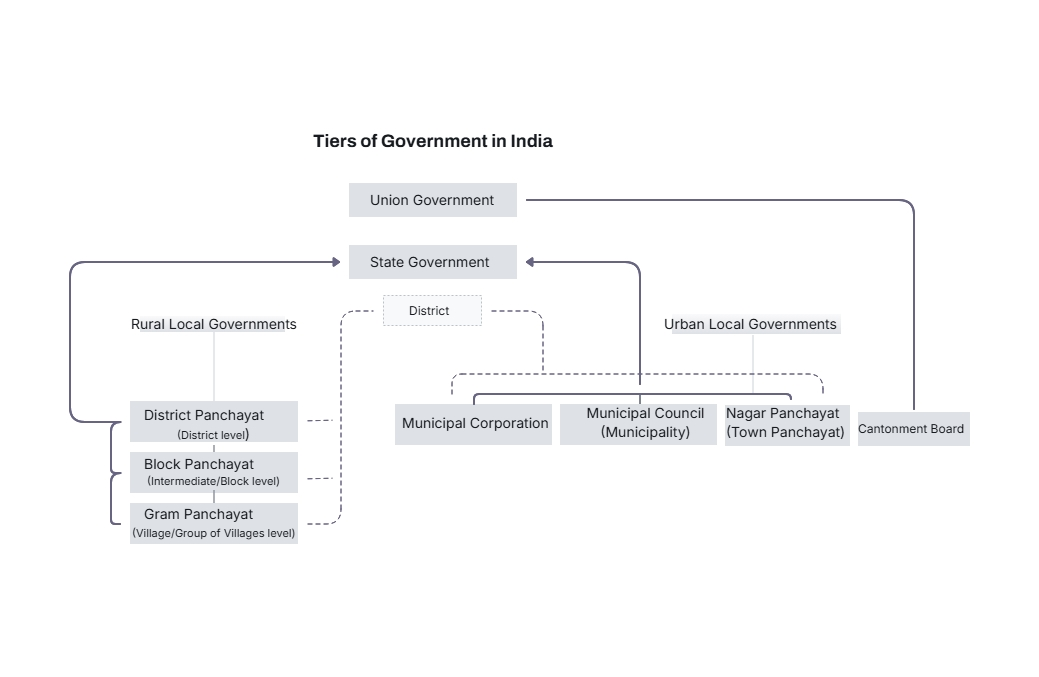
Tiers of Government in India

== History ==
Municipal governance in India in its current form has existed since the year 1664. In 1664, Fort Kochi Municipality was established by the Dutch, making it the first municipality in the Indian subcontinent, which got dissolved when Dutch authority got weaker in the 18th century. The British followed with the formation of Madras Municipal Corporation in 1687, and then Calcutta and Bombay Municipal Corporation in 1726. In the early part of the nineteenth century almost all towns in India had experienced some form of municipal governance. In 1882 the then Viceroy of India, Lord Ripon, known as the Father of Local Self Government, passed a resolution of local self-government which lead the democratic forms of municipal governance in India.

In 1919, a Government of India Act incorporated the need of the resolution and the powers of democratically elected government were formulated. In 1935 another Government of India Act brought local government under the preview of the state or provincial government and specific powers were given.

== 74th Constitutional Amendment Act ==
It was the 74th amendment to the Constitution of India in 1992 that brought constitutional validity to municipal or local governments. Until amendments were made in respective state municipal legislations as well, municipal authorities were organised on an ultra vires (beyond the authority) basis and the state governments were free to extend or control the functional sphere through executive decisions without an amendment to the legislative provisions.

As per the 2011 Census, the key urbanised areas were classified as follows

1. Statutory Towns: All areas under statutory urban administrative units like Municipal Corporation, Municipality, Cantonment Board, Notified Town Area Committee, Town Panchayat, Nagar Palika, etc., are known as Statutory Towns. According to 2011 Census of India, there were 4041 statutory urban local bodies (ULBs) in the country as compared to 3799 as per Census of 2001.
2. Census Towns: All Administrative units satisfying the following three criteria simultaneously: i) A minimum population of 5,000 persons; ii) 75 percent and above of the male main working population being engaged in non–agricultural pursuits, and iii) A density of population of at least 400 persons per km^{2}. As per the 2011 Census, there were 3,784 Census Towns against 1,362 in 2001.

Statutory towns are of various kinds and the major categories include

1. Municipal corporation (Nagar Nigam, नगर निगम)
2. Municipality (municipal council, municipal board, municipal committee) (Nagar Parishad, नगर परिषद्)
3. Town area committee
4. Notified area committee

The municipal corporations and municipalities are fully representative bodies, while the notified area committees and town area committees are either fully or partially nominated bodies. As per the Constitution of India, 74th Amendment Act of 1992, the latter two categories of towns are to be designated as municipalities or Nagar panchayats with elected bodies.

After the 74th Amendment was enacted there are only three categories of urban local bodies:

- Municipal Corporation (Mahanagar Nigam, महानगर निगम)
- Municipality / Municipal Council (Nagar Palika, Nagar Palika Parishad, नगर पालिका)
- Nagar Panchayat (Town Panchayat)(नगर पंचायत)

Among all urban local governments, municipal corporations enjoy a greater degree of fiscal autonomy and functions, although the specific fiscal and functional powers vary across the states. These local governments have larger populations, a more diversified economic base, and deal with the state governments directly. On the other hand, municipalities or Nagar panchayats have less autonomy, smaller jurisdictions, and have to deal with the state governments through the Directorate of Municipalities or through the collector of a district. These local bodies are subject to detailed supervisory control and guidance by the state governments.

== State Municipal Acts ==
State Municipal Acts are legislations enacted by state governments to establish municipal governments, administer them, and provide a framework of governance for cities within the state. Every state has its own municipal act and some states have more than one municipal act, governing larger and smaller municipalities under different acts. Various processes including rules for elections, recruitment of staff, and demarcation of urban areas derived from the state municipal acts. Most Municipal Acts are enforced across all statutory urban areas in the respective states except the cantonment areas. The Government of India had issued a Model Municipal Law in 2003 which aimed to consolidate and amend the laws relating to the municipal governments in the various states and bring them into conformity with the provisions of the 74th CAA.

== Responsibilities of urban local bodies ==
The municipal bodies of India are vested with a long list of functions delegated to them by the state governments under their respective municipal legislations.

The Twelfth Schedule of Constitution (Article 243 w) provides an illustrative list of eighteen functions, that may be entrusted to the municipalities.

Public health includes water supply, sewerage and sanitation, eradication of communicable diseases etc.; welfare includes public facilities such as education, recreation, etc.; regulatory functions related to prescribing and enforcing building regulations, encroachments on public land, birth registration and death certificate, etc.; public safety includes fire protection, street lighting, etc.; public works measures such as construction and maintenance of inner-city roads, etc.; and development functions related to town planning and development of commercial markets. In addition to the legally assigned functions, the sectoral departments of the state government often assign unilaterally, and on an agency basis, various functions such as family planning, nutrition and slum improvement, disease and Epidemic control, etc.

Besides the traditional core functions of municipalities, it also includes development functions like planning for economic development and social justice, urban poverty alleviation programs, and promotion of cultural, educational, and aesthetic aspects. However, conformity legislation enacted by the state governments indicates wide variations in this regard. Whereas Bihar, Gujarat, Himachal Pradesh, Haryana, Manipur, Punjab and Rajasthan have included all the functions as enlisted in the Twelfth Schedule in their amended state municipal laws, Andhra Pradesh has not made any changes in the existing list of municipal functions. Karnataka, Kerala, Madhya Pradesh, Maharashtra, Odisha, Tamil Nadu, Uttar Pradesh and West Bengal states have amended their municipal laws to add additional functions in the list of municipal functions as suggested in the twelfth schedule.

There is a lot of difference in the assignment of obligatory and discretionary functions to the municipal bodies among the states. Whereas functions like planning for the social and economic development, urban forestry and protection of the environment and promotion of ecological aspects are obligatory functions for the municipalities of Maharashtra, in Karnataka these are discretionary functions.

The provision of water supply and sewerage in several states has either been taken over by the state governments or transferred to state agencies. For example, in Tamil Nadu, Madhya Pradesh and Gujarat, water supply and sewerage works are being carried out by the state-level Public Health Engineering Department or the Water Supply and Sewerage Boards, while liability for repayment of loans and maintenances are with the municipalities. Besides these state-level agencies, City Improvement Trusts and Urban Development Authorities, like Delhi Development Authority (DDA), have been set up in a number of cities. These agencies usually undertake land acquisition and development works and take up remunerative projects such as markets and commercial complexes, etc.

In terms of fiscal federalism, functions whose benefits largely confine to municipal jurisdictions and may be termed as the essentially municipal functions. Similarly, functions that involve substantial economics of scale or are of national interest may not be assigned to small local bodies. For valid reasons, certain functions of higher authorities are appropriate to be entrusted with the Municipalities – as if under principal-agent contracts and may be called agency functions that need to be financed by intergovernmental revenues. Thus instead of continuing the traditional distinction between obligatory and discretionary functions the municipal responsibilities may be grouped into essentially municipal, joint and agency functions.

=== Suggested municipal functions ===
The suggested functions to municipal corporations, municipalities, and town panchayats are listed in the table below.

Essentially Municipal Functions	Municipal Corporation	Municipal Council	Town Panchayat
Urban planning including town planning	Yes	Yes	Yes
Regulation of land-use and construction of buildings	Yes	Yes	Yes
Planning for economic and social development	Yes	Yes	Yes
Roads and bridges	Yes	Yes	Yes
Water supply domestic, industrial and commercial purposes	Yes	Yes	Yes
Public health, sanitation, conservancy, and solid waste management	Yes	Yes	Yes
Fire services	Yes	Yes	No
Urban forestry	Yes	Yes	Yes
Preventive Health Care	Yes	Yes	Yes
Provision of urban amenities and facilities such as parks, gardens, playgrounds	Yes	Yes	Yes
Burials and burial grounds, cremations, cremation ghats/grounds, and electric crematoria	Yes	Yes	Yes
Cattle pounds, prevention of cruelty to animals	Yes	Yes	Yes
Vital statistics including registration of births and deaths	Yes	Yes	Yes
Street lighting	Yes	Yes	Yes
Parking lots, bus stops, and public conveniences	Yes	Yes	Yes
Regulation of slaughter-houses and tanneries	Yes	Yes	Yes
Slum improvement and up-gradation	Yes	Yes	Yes
Agency Functions			
Protection of the environment and promotion of ecological aspects	Yes	Yes	Yes
Safeguarding the interests of weaker sections of society, including the handicapped and the intellectually disabled	Yes	Yes	Yes
Urban poverty alleviation	Yes	Yes	Yes
Promotion of cultural, education, and aesthetic aspects	Yes	Yes	Yes
Primary Education	Yes	Yes	Yes
Primary Health Care	Yes	Yes	Yes

== Nomenclature ==
Urban Local Body Type	Nomenclature Across States (Also known as )
Municipal Corporation	Mahanagar Palika, Nagar Nigam, Mahanagara Palike, Nagarasabha, Corporation of the City, etc
Municipality / Municipal Council	Nagar Palika, Nagar Parishad, Nagar Palika Parishad, Municipality, Municipal Council, Nagarpalika, City Municipal Council, Town Municipal Council, Municipal Board, Municipal Council (NE states)
Nagar Panchayat / Transitional Body	Nagar Panchayat, Town Panchayat, Notified Area, Notified Area Council (NAC), Town Committee, Town Board, etc

== Municipal Corporation ==
Nagar Nigam and other names in different states (translated as "Municipal Corporation/City Corporation") in India are state government formed urban local bodies that work for the development of a metropolitan city, which has a population of more than 1 million. The growing population and urbanisation in various cities of India were in need of a local governing body that can work for providing necessary community services like health centres, educational institutes, and housing and property tax. They also replace street lights.

They are formed under the Corporations Act of 1835 which mainly deals with providing essential services in a major city. Their elections are held once in five years and the people choose the candidates. The largest corporations are in the eight metropolitan cities of India, namely Mumbai, Delhi, Kolkata, Chennai, Bangalore, Hyderabad, Ahmedabad, Surat, and Pune. These cities not only have a large population but are also the administrative as well as commercial centres of the country.

== Municipal Council ==
A Municipality, or Municipal Council, is an urban local body that administers a smaller urban area with a minimum population of 100,000 but less than 1,000,000. However, there are exceptions to that, as previously municipalities were constituted in urban centers with a population over 20,000 were reclassified as Municipality even if their population was under 100,000. Locally, the municipality is known as Nagar Palika or Nagar Parishad and these are constituted by the Municipal Acts of the respective states.

Municipalities in India are categorized into City Municipal Councils and Town Municipal Councils or grades, the classification of which depends on factors like population, economic growth, employment, and more. This classification varies from state to state. For instance, in Kerala, municipalities are graded as I, II, III, while in Bihar, the classification is denoted as Class A, B, C. The criteria for these classifications include population, population density, non-agricultural employment, and other relevant parameters.

It interacts directly with the state government, though it is administratively part of the district it is located in. Generally smaller district cities and bigger towns have a Municipality. Municipalities are also a form of local self-government, entrusted with some duties and responsibilities, as enshrined and guided upon by the Constitutional (74th Amendment) Act, 1992. Udaipur is a city which is big but its population is 451,000 so it has a Municipality.

The members of the Municipal Councils are elected representatives for a term of five years. The town is divided into wards according to its population, and representatives are elected from each ward. The members elect a chairperson and vice chairperson among themselves to preside over and conduct meetings. A chief officer, along with officers like an engineer, sanitary inspector, health officer, and education officer who come from the state public service are appointed by the state government to control the administrative affairs of the municipality.

City Municipal Councils are known regionally by different names, including Town Municipal Council, Town Municipality, Nagar Palika, Nagarasabe, Purasabe, Nagara Sabha and Nagaraatchi.

== Town Panchayat ==
A Town Panchayat (also known as Nagar Panchayat or Town Board) is a form of an urban political unit in India comparable to a municipality. The composition of Town Panchayats varies across states, serving as the governing body for areas transitioning from 'rural' to 'urban'.

Town Panchayats in Tamil Nadu are established based on a population range of above 5000 and below 30,000, categorized into grades determined by criteria including population and economic growth. In Bihar, Town Panchayats are constituted for populations ranging from above 12,000 to below 40,000, while in Karnataka, the criteria are above 10,000 and below 20,000.

Each Nagar Panchayat has a committee consisting of a chairman with ward members. Membership consists of a minimum of ten elected ward members and three nominated members. The members of the Nagar Panchayat are elected from the several wards of the Nagar Panchayat on the basis of adult franchise for a term of five years. There are seats reserved for Scheduled Castes, Scheduled Tribes, backward classes, and women. The Councillors or Ward Members are chosen by direct election from electoral wards in the Nagar Panchayats.

Town boards are also known by different names depending on the region, including: Nagar Panchayat, Taluk Panchayat, Municipal Board, Town Panchayat, and Pura Panchayat. Certain states lack Town Panchayats or equivalent urban local bodies. In the case of Kerala, Town Panchayats currently may not be in existence or may not be constituted, despite being stipulated in the Kerala Municipality Act.

== See also ==
- List of municipal corporations in India
- Local government in India
- Municipal council (India)
