= 14th Nagaland Assembly =

Unicameral legislature of the Indian state of Nagaland

←	13th Nagaland Assembly

Overview
- Legislative body: Nagaland Legislative Assembly
- Jurisdiction: Nagaland, India
- Meeting place: Nagaland Legislative Assembly Secretariat, Thizama, Kohima, Nagaland 797003
- Election: 2023 Nagaland Legislative Assembly election
- Government: North-East Democratic Alliance
- Opposition: None
- Website: https://webtest.nagaland.gov.in
- Members: 60
- Speaker: Sharingain Longkümer, NPF
- Deputy speaker: S. Toiho Yeptho, NPF
- Chief Minister: Neiphiu Rio, NPF
- Deputy Chief Minister: T. R. Zeliang, NPF; Yanthungo Patton, BJP

The Fourteenth Nagaland Assembly was formed by the members elected in the 2023 Nagaland Legislative Assembly election. Elections were held in 59 constituencies on 27th February 2023 while the representative for Akuluto was elected unopposed. Votes were counted on 2nd March 2023.

== Results ==
The incumbent North-East Democratic Alliance consisting Bharatiya Janata Party (BJP) and Nationalist Democratic Progressive Party (NDPP) gained majority in the house after winning 37 seats (25 NDPP + 12 BJP).

Hekani Jakhalu Kense from Dimapur III and Salhoutuonuo Kruse from Western Angami constituencies became the first women MLAs in the history of Nagaland. Both got elected as NDPP candidates.

== Party wise distribution ==
Alliance	Party	No. of MLA's		Leader of the Party in Assembly	Leader's Constituency
North-East Democratic Alliance	Naga People's Front	39	60	Neiphiu Rio	Northern Angami II
North-East Democratic Alliance	Bharatiya Janata Party	12	60	Yanthungo Patton	Tyüi
North-East Democratic Alliance	Republican Party of India (Athawale)	2	60		
North-East Democratic Alliance	Lok Janshakti Party (Ram Vilas)	2	60		
North-East Democratic Alliance	Independent	5	60	Jwenga Seb; C. Manpon Konyak; Dr. Neisatuo Mero; Kevipodi Sophie; B. Bangtick Phom	Tseminyü; Aboi; Pfütsero; Southern Angami I; Tamlu
Total		60			

== Members of Legislative Assembly ==
District	No.	Constituency	Name	Party	Remarks
Dimapur	1	Dimapur I	H. Tovihoto Ayemi	BJP	
Dimapur	2	Dimapur II (ST)	Moatoshi Longkümer	NPF	Nationalist Democratic Progressive Party merged with NPF in Oct 2025
Chümoukedima	3	Dimapur III (ST)	Hekani Jakhalu Kense	NPF	Nationalist Democratic Progressive Party merged with NPF in Oct 2025
Chümoukedima and Niuland	4	Ghaspani I (ST)	Jacob Zhimomi	BJP	Cabinet Minister
Chümoukedima	5	Ghaspani II (ST)	Zhaleo Rio	NPF	Nationalist Democratic Progressive Party merged with NPF in Oct 2025
Peren	6	Tening (ST)	Namri Nchang	NCP	Switched from NCP to NDPP
Peren	6	Tening (ST)	Namri Nchang	NPF	Nationalist Democratic Progressive Party merged with NPF in Oct 2025
Peren	7	Peren (ST)	T. R. Zeliang	NPF	Deputy Chief Minister; Nationalist Democratic Progressive Party merged with NPF in Oct 2025
Kohima	8	Western Angami (ST)	Salhoutuonuo Kruse	NPF	Cabinet Minister; Nationalist Democratic Progressive Party merged with NPF in Oct 2025
Kohima	9	Kohima Town (ST)	Tseilhoutuo Rhütso	NPP	Switched from NPP to NPF
Kohima	9	Kohima Town (ST)	Tseilhoutuo Rhütso	NPF	Switched from NPP to NPF
Kohima	10	Northern Angami I (ST)	Kekhrielhoulie Yhome	NPF	Nationalist Democratic Progressive Party merged with NPF in Oct 2025
Kohima	11	Northern Angami II (ST)	Neiphiu Rio	NPF	Nationalist Democratic Progressive Party merged with NPF in Oct 2025 Chief Minister
Tseminyü	12	Tseminyü (ST)	Jwenga Seb	JD(U)	JD(U) Nagaland unit disbanded
Tseminyü	12	Tseminyü (ST)	Jwenga Seb	IND	JD(U) Nagaland unit disbanded
Zünheboto	13	Pughoboto (ST)	Sukhato A. Sema	LJP(RV)	
Kohima	14	Southern Angami I (ST)	Kevipodi Sophie	IND	
Kohima	15	Southern Angami II (ST)	Kropol Vitsü	BJP	
Phek	16	Pfütsero (ST)	Neisatuo Mero	IND	
Phek	17	Chizami (ST)	K. G. Kenye	NPF	Cabinet Minister; Nationalist Democratic Progressive Party merged with NPF in Oct 2025
Phek	18	Chozuba (ST)	Küdecho Khamo	NPF	Nationalist Democratic Progressive Party merged with NPF in Oct 2025
Phek	19	Phek (ST)	Kuzholuzo Nienu	NPF	
Phek	20	Meluri (ST)	Z. Nyusietho Nyuthe	NPF	Nationalist Democratic Progressive Party merged with NPF in Oct 2025
Mokokchung	21	Tuli (ST)	A. Pangjung Jamir	BJP	
Mokokchung	22	Arkakong (ST)	Nuklutoshi	NPP	Switched from NPP to NPF
Mokokchung	22	Arkakong (ST)	Nuklutoshi	NPF	Switched from NPP to NPF
Mokokchung	23	Impur (ST)	T. M. Mannen	NPF	Nationalist Democratic Progressive Party merged with NPF in Oct 2025
Mokokchung	24	Angetyongpang (ST)	Tongpang Ozüküm	NPF	Nationalist Democratic Progressive Party merged with NPF in Oct 2025
Mokokchung	25	Mongoya (ST)	Imkongmar	NPF	Nationalist Democratic Progressive Party merged with NPF in Oct 2025
Mokokchung	26	Aonglenden (ST)	Sharingain Longkümer	NPF	Nationalist Democratic Progressive Party merged with NPF in Oct 2025
Mokokchung	27	Mokokchung Town (ST)	Metsübo Jamir	NPF	Nationalist Democratic Progressive Party merged with NPF in Oct 2025Cabinet Minister
Mokokchung	28	Koridang (ST)	Imkong L. Imchen	BJP	Died on 11 November 2025
Mokokchung	28	Koridang (ST)	Daochier I. Imchen	BJP	Elected in 2026 by-election.
Mokokchung	29	Jangpetkong (ST)	Temjenmemba	NPF	Nationalist Democratic Progressive Party merged with NPF in Oct 2025
Mokokchung	30	Alongtaki (ST)	Temjen Imna Along	BJP	Cabinet Minister
Zünheboto	31	Akuluto (ST)	Kazheto Kinimi	BJP	
Zünheboto	32	Atoizü (ST)	Picto Shohe	NCP	Switched from NCP to NDPP
Zünheboto	32	Atoizü (ST)	Picto Shohe	NPF	Nationalist Democratic Progressive Party merged with NPF in Oct 2025
Zünheboto	33	Suruhoto (ST)	S. Toiho Yeptho	NCP	Deputy Speaker; Switched from NCP to NPF
Zünheboto	33	Suruhoto (ST)	S. Toiho Yeptho	NPF	Deputy Speaker; Switched from NCP to NPF
Zünheboto	34	Aghunato (ST)	G. Ikuto Zhimomi	NPF	Nationalist Democratic Progressive Party merged with NPF in Oct 2025
Zünheboto	35	Zünheboto (ST)	K. Tokugha Sukhalu	NPF	Nationalist Democratic Progressive Party merged with NPF in Oct 2025
Zünheboto	36	Satakha (ST)	G. Kaito Aye	NPF	Nationalist Democratic Progressive Party merged with NPF in Oct 2025 Cabinet Minister
Wokha	37	Tyüi (ST)	Yanthungo Patton	BJP	Deputy Chief Minister
Wokha	38	Wokha (ST)	Y. Mhonbemo Hümtsoe	NCP	Switched from NCP to NDPP Nationalist Democratic Progressive Party merged with NPF in Oct 2025
Wokha	38	Wokha (ST)	Y. Mhonbemo Hümtsoe	NPF	Switched from NCP to NDPP Nationalist Democratic Progressive Party merged with NPF in Oct 2025
Wokha	39	Sanis (ST)	Mhathung Yanthan	NPF	Nationalist Democratic Progressive Party merged with NPF in Oct 2025
Wokha	40	Bhandari (ST)	Achumbemo Kikon	NPF	
Mon	41	Tizit (ST)	P. Paiwang Konyak	BJP	Cabinet Minister
Mon	42	Wakching (ST)	W. Chingang Konyak	NPF	Nationalist Democratic Progressive Party merged with NPF in Oct 2025
Mon	43	Tapi (ST)	Noke Wangnao	NDPP	Died on 28 August 2023
Mon	43	Tapi (ST)	Wangpang Konyak	NPF	Elected in December 2023 by-election. Nationalist Democratic Progressive Party merged with NPF in Oct 2025
Mon	44	Phomching (ST)	K. Konngam Konyak	BJP	
Mon	45	Tehok (ST)	C. L. John	NPF	Nationalist Democratic Progressive Party merged with NPF in Oct 2025. Cabinet Minister
Mon	46	Mon Town (ST)	Y. Mankhao Konyak	NCP	Switched from NCP to NDPP. Nationalist Democratic Progressive Party merged with NPF in Oct 2025
Mon	46	Mon Town (ST)	Y. Mankhao Konyak	NPF	Switched from NCP to NDPP. Nationalist Democratic Progressive Party merged with NPF in Oct 2025
Mon	47	Aboi (ST)	C. Manpon Konyak	IND	
Mon	48	Moka (ST)	A. Nyamnyei Konyak	NPP	Switched from NPP to NPF
Mon	48	Moka (ST)	A. Nyamnyei Konyak	NPF	Switched from NPP to NPF
Longleng	49	Tamlu (ST)	B. Bangtick Phom	IND	
Longleng	50	Longleng (ST)	A. Pongshi Phom	NCP	Switched from NCP to NDPP. Nationalist Democratic Progressive Party merged with NPF in Oct 2025
Longleng	50	Longleng (ST)	A. Pongshi Phom	NPF	Switched from NCP to NDPP. Nationalist Democratic Progressive Party merged with NPF in Oct 2025
Tuensang	51	Noksen (ST)	Y. Lima Onen Chang	RPI(A)	
Tuensang	52	Longkhim–Chare (ST)	Sethrongkyu Sangtam	BJP	
Tuensang	53	Tuensang Sadar I (ST)	P. Bashangmongba Chang	BJP	Cabinet Minister
Tuensang	54	Tuensang Sadar II (ST)	Imtichoba	RPI(A)	
Mon	55	Tobu (ST)	Naiba Konyak	LJP(RV)	
Noklak	56	Noklak (ST)	Puthai Longon	NCP	Switched from NCP to NDPP Nationalist Democratic Progressive Party merged with NPF in Oct 2025
Noklak	56	Noklak (ST)	Puthai Longon	NPF	Switched from NCP to NDPP Nationalist Democratic Progressive Party merged with NPF in Oct 2025
Noklak	57	Thonoknyu (ST)	Benei M. Lamthiu	NPP	Switched from NPP to NPF
Noklak	57	Thonoknyu (ST)	Benei M. Lamthiu	NPF	Switched from NPP to NPF
Shamator	58	Shamator–Chessore (ST)	S. Keoshu Yimchunger	NPF	Nationalist Democratic Progressive Party merged with NPF in Oct 2025
Kiphire	59	Seyochung–Sitimi (ST)	C. Kipili Sangtam	NPP	Switched from NPP to NPF
Kiphire	59	Seyochung–Sitimi (ST)	C. Kipili Sangtam	NPF	Switched from NPP to NPF
Kiphire	60	Pungro–Kiphire (ST)	S. Kiusumew Yimchunger	NPF	Nationalist Democratic Progressive Party merged with NPF in Oct 2025
