= Government of Nagaland =

Indian State Government

- Emblem of Nagaland
- Seat of Government: Kohima

Legislative branch
- Assembly: Nagaland Legislative Assembly
- Speaker: Sharingain Longkümer (NPF)
- Deputy Speaker: S. Toiho Yeptho (NPF)
- Members in Assembly: 60

Executive branch
- Governor: Nand Kishore Yadav
- Chief Minister: Neiphiu Rio (NPF)
- Deputy Chief Minister: T. R. Zeliang (NPF); Yanthungo Patton (BJP)

Judiciary
- High Court: Kohima Bench, Gauhati High Court
- Chief Justice: Ashutosh Kumar

The Government of Nagaland also known as the State Government of Nagaland, or locally as State Government, is the governing authority of the Indian state of Nagaland and its 17 districts. It consists of an executive, led by the Governor of Nagaland, a judiciary and a legislative branch. Kohima is the capital of Nagaland, and houses the Vidhan Sabha (Legislative Assembly) and the S ecretariat.

== Executive ==
Like other states in India, the head of state of Nagaland is the Governor, appointed by the President of India on the advice of the Central government. Their post is largely ceremonial. The Chief Minister is the head of government and is vested with most of the executive powers. The Nagaland State Government declared the year, 2016 as the 'Year of the Construction Workers'.

=== Council of Ministers ===
S.No	Name	Constituency	Department	Party
1.	Neiphiu Rio; Chief Minister	Northern Anagami II	Finance; Personnel and Administrative Reforms; All important policy issues; Other departments not allocated to any Minister.	NPF
Deputy Chief Minister
2.	T. R. Zeliang	Peren	Planning and Transformation; National Highway	NPF
3.	Yanthungo Patton	Tyüi	Home; Border Affairs	BJP
Cabinet Ministers
4.	C. L. John	Tehok	Forest, Environment and Climate Change; Village Guard	NPF
5.	G. Kaito Aye	Satakha	Roads and Bridges	NPF
6.	Jacob Zhimomi	Ghaspani I	Public Health Engineering; Cooperation	BJP
7.	K. G. Kenye	Chizami	Power; Parliamentary Affairs	NPF
8.	Metsübo Jamir	Mokokchung Town	Rural Development; State Institute of Rural Development (SIDR)	NPF
9.	P. Bashangmongba Chang	Tuensang Sadar I	Housing and Mechanical Engineering	BJP
10.	P. Paiwang Konyak	Tizit	Health and Family Welfare	BJP
11.	Salhoutuonuo Kruse	Western Angami	Women Resource Development; Horticulture	NPF
12.	Temjen Imna Along	Alongtaki	Tourism; Higher Education	BJP

== Legislative ==
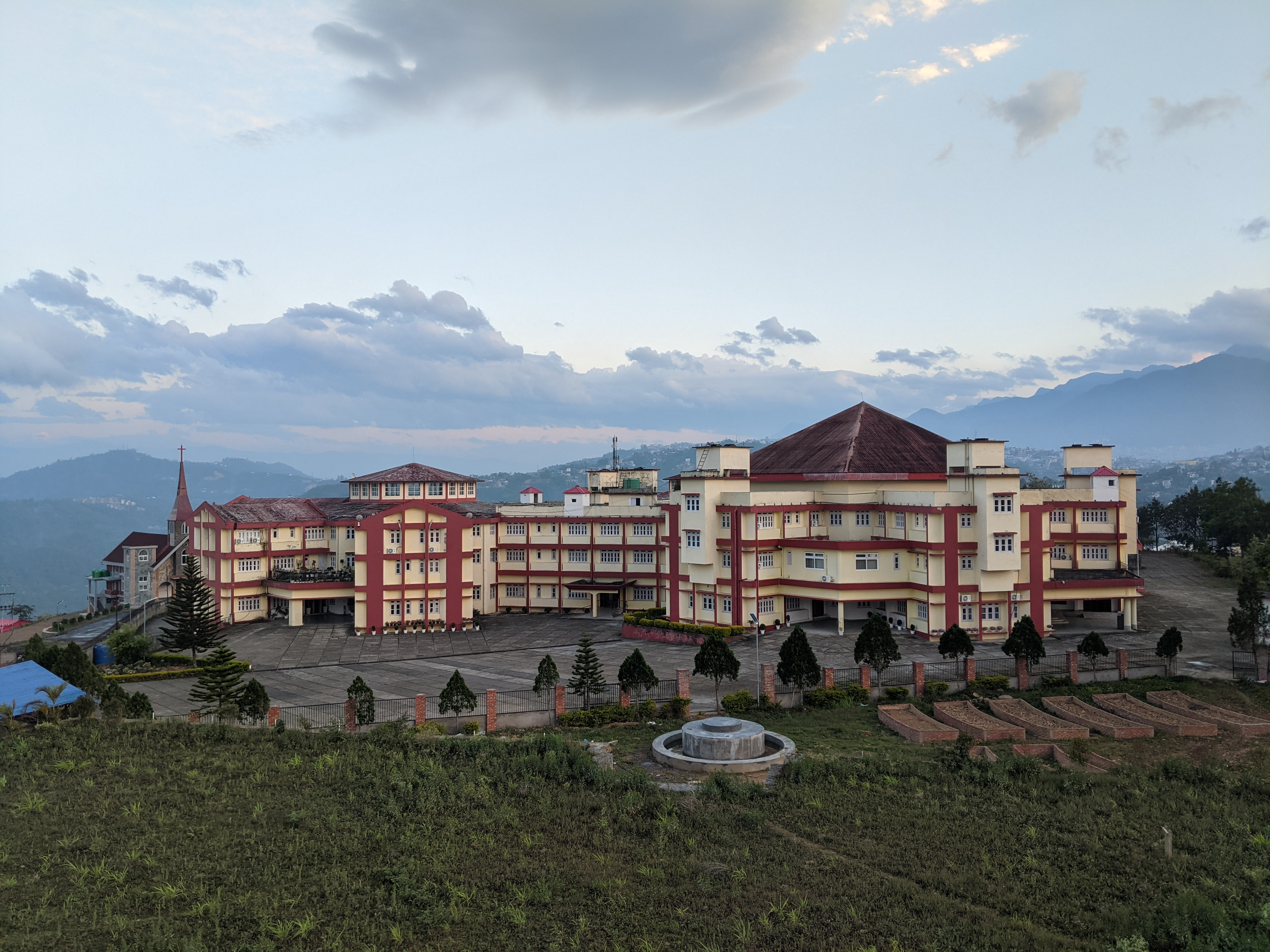
Nagaland Legislative Assembly building in Kohima

The present Nagaland Legislative Assembly is unicameral, consisting of 60 Member of the Legislative Assembly (M.L.A). Its term is 5 years, unless sooner dissolved.

== Judicial ==
The Gauhati High Court, located in Guwahati, Assam has a Kohima Bench that exercises the jurisdiction and powers in respect of cases arising in the State of Nagaland.

== District administration ==
Each of the sixteen districts of Nagaland has a Deputy Commissioner (DC). Districts may be further divided into "sub-divisions", each of which has an Additional Deputy Commissioner (ADC) in charge of administration. Larger sub-division may also require a number of Sub-Divisional Officers (SDOs) or Extra Assistant Commissioners (EACs) responsible for administrative circles within the sub-division.

== See also ==
- Nagaland Lok Sabha constituency
- Local government in Nagaland
