= K. L. Chishi =

Indian politician

7th Chief Minister of Nagaland
- In office 16 May 1990 – 19 June 1990
- Preceded by: S. C. Jamir
- Succeeded by: Vamuzo Phesao
- Constituency: Atoizu

Personal details
- Born: 1 January 1944 (age 82) Naghutomi, Nagaland
- Party: Indian National Congress
- Spouse: Erali Swu
- Parent: Lukhashe Chishi (father)
- Education: Graduate Professional
- Profession: Politician, Social Worker

K. L. Chishi (born 1 January 1944) is an Indian politician from Indian National Congress (INC). He was the founder chief of the Nationalist Democratic Movement, a political party in the Indian state of Nagaland. He served as Chief Minister of Nagaland in 1990 for 28 days before resigning from office.

== Political life ==
He successfully contested the 2008 Nagaland Legislative Assembly election from Dimapur-I constituency (Dimapur) under the INC.

Chishi fought the 2013 Nagaland Legislative Assembly election from Dimapur I Assembly constituency on an INC ticket and lost to Tovihoto Ayemi of the Naga People's Front (NPF).

In January 2018 Chishi left the INC and joined the Bharatiya Janata Party (BJP) after INC leader Rahul Gandhi had appointed him on an eight member coordination committee for the 2018 Nagaland Legislative Assembly election. That year, many Naga politicians joined the BJP leaving their former parties or independent status, including Yanthungo Patton and Jacob Zhimomi. Chishi justified his switch as an attempt to resolve the impending Naga peace process which the INC had failed to achieve. However, the state's Nagaland Pradesh Congress Committee noted that many before him joined the regional parties or BJP with the same excuse without any process.Chishi also accused the incumbent Rio government of 'robbing development funds, leaving the state exchequer empty and leaving government employees and students without remuneration and stipends.'

For the 2018 elections, BJP offered Chishi its party ticket for the Atoizü Assembly constituency which he lost to Picto Shohe. Subsequently, he was offered the position of chairman of the Development Authority of Nagaland by CM Rio, but he declined.

After the 2018 election defeat, Chishi rejoined the Indian National Congress on 14 March 2019.
