= K. G. Kenye =

Indian politician

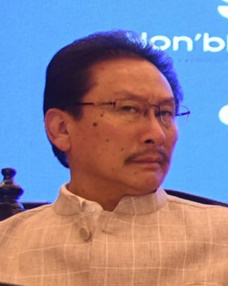

Cabinet Minister, Government of Nagaland
- Incumbent
- Assumed office 7 March 2023
- Governor: La. Ganesan
- Cabinet: Fifth Rio ministry
- Chief Minister: Neiphiu Rio
- Ministry and Departments: Power; Parliamentary Affairs

Member of Nagaland Legislative Assembly
- Incumbent
- Assumed office March 2023
- Constituency: Chizami

MP of Rajya Sabha for Nagaland
- In office 3 April 2016 – March 2022
- Preceded by: Khekiho Zhimomi, NPF
- Succeeded by: Phangnon Konyak, BJP
- Constituency: Nagaland

Personal details
- Born: 6 November 1960 (age 65)
- Party: Naga People's Front
- Spouse: Sashila Kenye
- Children: 4
- Parent: Goyiepra Kenye
- Education: Kohima College (NEHU)
- Occupation: Politician

K. G. Kenye is an Indian politician from Nagaland. He belongs to Naga People's Front. He is currently a cabinet minister in the Government of Nagaland and member of Nagaland Legislative Assembly representing Chizami.

== Political career ==
He is a former Secretary-General of the Naga People's Front party, a regional party in Nagaland, Manipur and Arunachal Pradesh and a former Advisor to the Chief Minister of Nagaland . He was elected to the Rajya Sabha for Nagaland seat after the incumbent, Khekiho Zhimomi died on 26 November 2015. As Khekiho Zhimomi was retiring on 2 April 2016, fresh election for a fresh term was held, and KG Kenye was elected unopposed on 14 March 2016.

=== 2023-present ===
In 2023 he was elected as a candidate of Nationalist Democratic Progressive Party from Chizami Assembly constituency. On March 7, 2023 he was inducted as Cabinet Minister in charge of Power and Parliamentary Affairs portfolios.

As the power minister, he highlighted that the state was facing a 90% shortfall in electricity generation and the state spent too much money paying for electricity imports which could have been invested in health and education instead.
