= Hokishe Sema =

Indian politician

3rd Chief Minister of Nagaland
- In office 29 October 1986 – 7 August 1988
- Preceded by: S. C. Jamir
- Succeeded by: President's Rule
- In office 22 February 1969 – 26 February 1974
- Preceded by: T. N. Angami
- Succeeded by: Vizol Koso

4th Governor of Himachal Pradesh
- In office 13 April 1983 – 7 March 1986
- Chief Minister: Virbhadra Singh
- Preceded by: A. K. Banerjee
- Succeeded by: Prabodh Dinkarrao Desai (additional charge)

Personal details
- Born: 6 March 1921 Sütemi, Naga Hills District, Assam Province, British India (Now in Zünheboto District, Nagaland, India)
- Died: 31 January 2007 (aged 85) Dimapur, Nagaland, India
- Party: Naga Nationalist Organization Indian National Congress (until 1994); Bharatiya Janata Party (from 1999)

Hokishe Sema (6 March 1921 – 31 January 2007) was an Indian politician who served as the third Chief Minister of Nagaland and the fourth Governor of Himachal Pradesh. He was also a member of the drafting committee of the Naga People's Convention.

== Early life ==
Sema was born on 6 March 1921 in the Sütemi village in the erstwhile Naga Hills District (present-day Zünheboto District of Nagaland). He studied in Mokokchung Government School before proceeding to Serampore College and St Anthony's College in Shillong. He joined government service in the 1950s as a school inspector, later serving as an assistant commissioner of the then Naga Hills district of undivided Assam.

== Political career ==
In the late 1950s, he became a member of the drafting committee of the Naga People's Convention. A sixteen-point agreement signed with the Government of India on the basis of this Convention led to the formation of the separate state of Nagaland in 1960. Sema became a member of the interim body of the new state government in 1961.

In 1964, Sema was elected unopposed to the first legislative assembly of the newly-formed Nagaland state from the Akuluto constituency. He served as the cabinet minister in the state governments headed by P. Shilu Ao and T. N. Angami.

In 1967, Sema was one of the two politicians inducted to the Home Mission Board of the Nagaland Baptist Church Church Council when it was reconstituted.

== Chief Minister of Nagaland ==
After the elections to the Second Legislative Assembly (1969-1974), the Naga Nationalist Organisation won 22 of the total 40 seats for which elections were conducted, 12 seats from Tuensang Area were nominated from the region. Eventually, the 12 nominated members as well as eight Independent members lent support to the NNO on 12 February raising the strength of the NNO to 41. Thereby, Sema who was elected the legislative leader of the NNO was sworn in as the third Chief Minister of Nagaland by governor Braj Kumar Nehru. During his term, two no-confidence motions were moved against him. Both, however, were defeated.

He lost his seat to Rano M. Shaiza in 1977.

He joined the Indian National Congress in late 70s, the first national party to set up a unit in Nagaland. In the 1980s Sema was the leader of the Congress (I) and after the 1987 assembly election, the party scored an absolute majority with 34 seats for the first time in the state. Consequently, Sema became the chief minister. His second term, which lasted eight months, came to end following 13 MLAs of the Congress party resigned on 31 July 1988. This reduced the party to 21 seats in the assembly of 60. The resigned MLAs accused the government of diverting huge funds from the state exchequer for private and individual benefits. Some of these MLAs support Vamüzo Phesao to form a new government. However, Nagaland governor K. V. Krishna Rao refused to meet them. Subsequently, President's rule was imposed in the state on 7 August 1988.

Sema's tenure as chief minister is remembered for the role he played in getting Naga underground members to surrender and their subsequent integration and redeployment as a full battalion of the Border Security Force.

He was elected to the Nagaland Legislative Assembly six times during which time he also served as the Finance Minister of the state and as the president of the Nagaland Pradesh Congress Committee from 2004 to 2008.

== Gubernatorial positions ==
From April 1983 to March 1986 he served as Governor of Himachal Pradesh and was later a member of the Rajya Sabha.

== Later political career ==
In 1994, he left the Indian National Congress owing to differences with the chief minister, S C Jamir and formed the Nationalist Democratic Movement.

He joined the Bharatiya Janata Party in 1999 and went on to become that party's national executive member.

In 2003 he was re-elected to the Nagaland Legislative Assembly as the Bharatiya Janata Party candidate from Dimapur-I constituency. He became leader of the BJP's legislature party and chairman of the ruling Democratic Alliance of Nagaland with Neiphiu Rio as Chief Minister.

He authored The Emergence of Nagaland in 1986.

== Death ==
Hokishe Sema died on 31 January 2007 of cardiac arrest. He was suffering from old age ailments and was admitted to hospital. He was buried with state honours in his native village of Sutemi. He was survived by his late wife at that time, five sons and a daughter.
