= T. R. Zeliang =

Indian politician

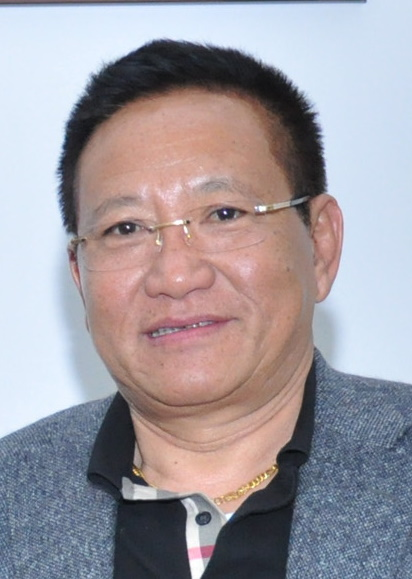
- Zeliang in 2015

4th Deputy Chief Minister of Nagaland
- Incumbent
- Assumed office 7 March 2023 Serving with Y. Patton
- Governor: La Ganesan; Ajay Kumar Bhalla
- Chief Minister: Neiphiu Rio
- Preceded by: I.K. Sema (1989)

10th Chief Minister of Nagaland
- In office 19 July 2017 – 8 March 2018
- Preceded by: Shürhozelie Liezietsu
- Succeeded by: Neiphiu Rio
- In office 24 May 2014 – 20 February 2017
- Preceded by: Neiphiu Rio
- Succeeded by: Shürhozelie Liezietsu

Leader Of Opposition (LoP) Nagaland Legislative Assembly
- In office 15 March 2018 – 7 May 2022
- Succeeded by: Vacant

Member of Nagaland Legislative Assembly
- Incumbent
- Assumed office 2008
- Preceded by: Vatsu Meru
- Constituency: Peren

Personal details
- Born: 21 February 1952 (age 74) Mbaupungwa, Assam, India (now in Nagaland, India)
- Party: Naga People's Front
- Other political affiliations: Nationalist Democratic Progressive Party
- Spouse: Kevizenuo Rangkau

Taditui Rangkau Zeliang (born 21 February 1952) is an Indian politician who is 4th serving as the Deputy Chief Minister of Nagaland under Neiphiu Rio alongside Yanthungo Patton. He has served twice as the Chief Minister of Nagaland, from May 2014 to February 2017 and from July 2017 to March 2018. A leader of the Naga People's Front, T. R. Zeliang previously served as a Member of Parliament, representing Nagaland in the Rajya Sabha, the upper house of the Indian Parliament. He served as the Chairman of United Democratic Alliance (Nagaland) and was former leader of the NPF Legislature Party and former Leader of Opposition in Nagaland Legislative Assembly. He represents the Peren Assembly constituency in Nagaland Legislative Assembly since 2008.

== Early life and education ==
T. R. Zeliang was born to Rangleu Zeliang on 21 February 1952 to a Zeliang Naga family of Mbaupungwa village under Peren district. He received his early education and matriculated from Don Bosco High School in Dibrugarh, Assam and served as the President of Zeliangrong Students Union, General Secretary of Zeliangrong Action Committee and Zeliangrong Youth Organisation while in college. He later entered politics and became the President of Peren District Youth Congress of the Indian National Congress.

== Political career ==
Zeliang contested the 1982 and 1987 Nagaland Assembly elections unsuccessfully from 6 Tening Assembly Constituency. He then won from Tening four times in a row, beginning with the elections of 1989 as a candidate of the Naga People's Council and subsequently in 1993, 1998 and 2003 as a candidate of the Indian National Congress. He served as Minister of State for Information and Tourism during 1989–90 and as Minister of State for Relief & Rehabilitation from 1994 to 1998. During 1998 – 2003, he was the Minister for Environment and Forests and Geology and Mining under the Ministry of S C Jamir. He formed Nagaland Congress in 2003 and later merged it into Naga People's Front (NPF). From 2004 to 2008, he was a Member of Parliament to the Rajya Sabha from Nagaland. Returning to State politics in 2008, he was Minister for Planning, Geology and Mining, Animal Husbandry and Parliamentary Affairs under the Ministry of Neiphiu Rio. He contested State elections 9 times, out of which he lost the first two elections and won the remaining 7. He won the assembly elections of 2008, 2013 and 2018 from Peren.

== Tenure as Chief Minister and Deputy Chief Minister ==
=== Chief Minister of Nagaland ===
T. R. Zeliang was the Chief Minister of Nagaland from May 2014 to February 2017 and from July 2017 to March 2018 as 19th Chief Minister of Nagaland. With 26 legislators in a House of 60, T.R. Zeliang was the legislature leader of the Naga Peoples' Front, the single largest Party in Nagaland. In 2022 T.R. Zeliang became the Chairman of United Democratic Alliance (Nagaland) in the opposition less Government of Nagaland.

=== Deputy Chief Minister of Nagaland ===
In 2023, he was sworn in as the deputy chief minister along with BJP's Yanthungo Patton.

Political offices
Preceded by Neiphiu Rio	Chief Minister of Nagaland; 24 May 2014 – 20 February 2017	Succeeded by Shurhozelie Liezietsu
Preceded by Shurhozelie Liezietsu	Chief Minister of Nagaland; 19 July 2017 – 8 March 2018	Succeeded by Neiphiu Rio
Deputy Chief Minister of Nagaland; 8 March 2023 - Incumbent
