= Mbaupungwa =

- village
- Location in Nagaland, India Mbaupungwa (India)
- Coordinates: 25.366159°N 93.644911°E
- Country: India
- State: Nagaland
- District: Peren
- Circle: Tening

Population (2011)
  - Total: 811
- Time zone: UTC+5:30 (IST)
- Census code: 268379

Mbaupungwa is a village in the Peren district of Nagaland, India. It is located in the Tening Circle. Nagaland's chief minister T. R. Zeliang was born here.

== Demographics ==
According to the 2011 census of India, Mbaupungwa has 156 households. The effective literacy rate (i.e. the literacy rate of population excluding children aged 6 and below) is 81.76%.

Demographics (2011 Census)
	Total	Male	Female
Population	811	445	366
Children aged below 6 years	142	78	64
Scheduled caste	0	0	0
Scheduled tribe	807	442	365
Literates	547	318	229
Workers (all)	412	224	188
Main workers (total)	342	182	160
Main workers: Cultivators	237	112	125
Main workers: Agricultural labourers	0	0	0
Main workers: Household industry workers	0	0	0
Main workers: Other	105	70	35
Marginal workers (total)	70	42	28
Marginal workers: Cultivators	19	17	2
Marginal workers: Agricultural labourers	0	0	0
Marginal workers: Household industry workers	0	0	0
Marginal workers: Others	51	25	26
Non-workers	399	221	178
