= Suruhoto Assembly constituency =

Legislative Assembly constituency in Nagaland State, India

Coordinates: 26.15°N 94.57°E

Suruhoto
- Constituency No. 33 for the Nagaland Legislative Assembly

Constituency details
- Country: India
- Region: Northeast India
- State: Nagaland
- District: Zünheboto
- Lok Sabha constituency: Nagaland
- Established: 1964
- Total electors: 16,057
- Reservation: ST

Member of Legislative Assembly
- 14th Nagaland Legislative Assembly
- Incumbent S. Toiho Yeptho
- Party: NPF
- Alliance: NDA
- Elected year: 2023

Suruhoto is one of the 60 Legislative Assembly constituencies of Nagaland state in India.

It is part of Zünheboto district and is reserved for candidates belonging to the Scheduled Tribes.

== Members of the Legislative Assembly ==
Year	Member	Party
1964	Nihovi Avemi	Independent politician
1969	Nihovi Sema	Nagaland Nationalist Organisation
1974	Nihovi Sema	Nagaland Nationalist Organisation
1977	Kanito	Indian National Congress
1982	Kiyozhe	Independent politician
1987	Kiyezhe Sema	Indian National Congress
1989	Khukivi Awomi	Naga People's Front
1993	Kiyezhe Aye	Indian National Congress
1998	Kiyezhe Sema	Indian National Congress
2003	Khutovi	Independent politician
2008	Shetoyi	Independent politician
2013	Shetoyi	Naga People's Front
2018	H. Khehovi	Bharatiya Janata Party
2023	S. Toiho Yeptho	Nationalist Congress Party

== Election results ==
=== 2023 Assembly election ===
2023 Nagaland Legislative Assembly election: Suruhoto
Party	Candidate	Votes	%	±%
NCP	S. Toiho Yeptho	6,919	50.18%	
BJP	H. Khehovi	6,850	49.68%	−32.51%
NOTA	Nota	18	0.13%	
Margin of victory		69	0.50%	−64.28%
Turnout		13,787	85.86%	−2.35%
Registered electors		16,057		7.21%
NCP gain from BJP		Swing	-32.01%	

=== 2018 Assembly election ===
2018 Nagaland Legislative Assembly election: Suruhoto
Party	Candidate	Votes	%	±%
BJP	H. Khehovi	10,860	82.20%	
NPF	Dr. Kaito Jakhalu	2,301	17.42%	−33.89%
NOTA	None of the Above	51	0.39%	
Margin of victory		8,559	64.78%	61.79%
Turnout		13,212	88.22%	−6.81%
Registered electors		14,977		5.02%
BJP gain from NPF		Swing	30.90%	

=== 2013 Assembly election ===
2013 Nagaland Legislative Assembly election: Suruhoto
Party	Candidate	Votes	%	±%
NPF	Shetoyi	6,952	51.30%	
INC	Kiyezhe Aye	6,547	48.31%	0.29%
Margin of victory		405	2.99%	−3.12%
Turnout		13,551	95.02%	6.10%
Registered electors		14,261		−2.68%
NPF gain from Independent		Swing	-2.83%	

=== 2008 Assembly election ===
2008 Nagaland Legislative Assembly election: Suruhoto
Party	Candidate	Votes	%	±%
Independent	Shetoyi	7,053	54.13%	
INC	Khutovi	6,257	48.02%	20.96%
RJD	Hokheto	40	0.31%	
Margin of victory		796	6.11%	−12.10%
Turnout		13,029	91.11%	−2.07%
Registered electors		14,653		43.42%
Independent hold		Swing	8.86%	

=== 2003 Assembly election ===
2003 Nagaland Legislative Assembly election: Suruhoto
Party	Candidate	Votes	%	±%
Independent	Khutovi	4,209	45.28%	
INC	Kiyezhe Aye	2,516	27.07%	
BJP	Khukivi Awomi	1,468	15.79%	
NDM	Dr. Shikikhe	1,074	11.55%	
Margin of victory		1,693	18.21%	
Turnout		9,296	90.99%	90.99%
Registered electors		10,217		11.36%
Independent gain from INC		Swing	-16.89%	

=== 1998 Assembly election ===
1998 Nagaland Legislative Assembly election: Suruhoto
Party	Candidate	Votes	%	±%
INC	Kiyezhe Sema	Unopposed		
Registered electors		9,175		−3.93%
INC hold		Swing		

=== 1993 Assembly election ===
1993 Nagaland Legislative Assembly election: Suruhoto
Party	Candidate	Votes	%	±%
INC	Kiyezhe Aye	5,608	62.17%	17.65%
Independent	Vihoshe	2,661	29.50%	
NPF	Holuto	752	8.34%	−47.15%
Margin of victory		2,947	32.67%	21.70%
Turnout		9,021	95.09%	1.97%
Registered electors		9,550		47.58%
INC gain from NPF		Swing	6.68%	

=== 1989 Assembly election ===
1989 Nagaland Legislative Assembly election: Suruhoto
Party	Candidate	Votes	%	±%
NPF	Khukivi Awomi	3,328	55.49%	
INC	Kiyezhe Aye	2,670	44.51%	1.15%
Margin of victory		658	10.97%	10.87%
Turnout		5,998	93.12%	−2.98%
Registered electors		6,471		0.00%
NPF gain from INC		Swing	12.12%	

=== 1987 Assembly election ===
1987 Nagaland Legislative Assembly election: Suruhoto
Party	Candidate	Votes	%	±%
INC	Kiyezhe Sema	2,677	43.37%	24.99%
NND	Khukivi Awomi	2,671	43.27%	29.25%
NPP	Khekiye	825	13.36%	
Margin of victory		6	0.10%	−2.63%
Turnout		6,173	96.11%	11.98%
Registered electors		6,471		−24.24%
INC gain from Independent		Swing	20.62%	

=== 1982 Assembly election ===
1982 Nagaland Legislative Assembly election: Suruhoto
Party	Candidate	Votes	%	±%
Independent	Kiyozhe	1,608	22.74%	
Independent	Khukivi Awomi	1,415	20.01%	
INC	Kanito	1,299	18.37%	−23.49%
NND	Pukhato	991	14.02%	
Independent	Nobevi	979	13.85%	
Independent	S. Jadipu	778	11.00%	
Margin of victory		193	2.73%	−4.69%
Turnout		7,070	84.13%	−3.05%
Registered electors		8,542		18.43%
Independent gain from INC		Swing	-19.12%	

=== 1977 Assembly election ===
1977 Nagaland Legislative Assembly election: Suruhoto
Party	Candidate	Votes	%	±%
INC	Kanito	2,584	41.87%	
UDA	Pukhahe	2,126	34.45%	
NCN	Kiyekhu	1,462	23.69%	
Margin of victory		458	7.42%	−11.58%
Turnout		6,172	87.18%	8.74%
Registered electors		7,213		−1.82%
INC gain from NNO		Swing	-6.73%	

=== 1974 Assembly election ===
1974 Nagaland Legislative Assembly election: Suruhoto
Party	Candidate	Votes	%	±%
NNO	Nihovi Sema	2,757	48.60%	−1.45%
Independent	Choito Sema	1,679	29.60%	
Independent	L. Yekhuyi Sema	1,237	21.81%	
Margin of victory		1,078	19.00%	4.02%
Turnout		5,673	78.44%	5.51%
Registered electors		7,347		42.38%
NNO hold		Swing	-1.45%	

=== 1969 Assembly election ===
1969 Nagaland Legislative Assembly election: Suruhoto
Party	Candidate	Votes	%	±%
NNO	Nihovi Sema	1,881	50.05%	
Independent	A. I. Pukhahe Sema	1,318	35.07%	
Independent	H. Vitoi Sema	559	14.87%	
Margin of victory		563	14.98%	
Turnout		3,758	72.93%	72.93%
Registered electors		5,160		108.48%
NNO gain from Independent		Swing		

=== 1964 Assembly election ===
1964 Nagaland Legislative Assembly election: Suruhoto
Party	Candidate	Votes	%	±%
Independent	Nihovi Avemi	Unopposed		
Registered electors		2,475		
Independent win (new seat)				

== See also ==
- List of constituencies of the Nagaland Legislative Assembly
- Zunheboto district
