= Longkhim–Chare Assembly constituency =

Legislative Assembly constituency in Nagaland State, India

Coordinates: 26.22°N 94.67°E

Longkhim–Chare
- Constituency No. 52 for the Nagaland Legislative Assembly

Constituency details
- Country: India
- Region: Northeast India
- State: Nagaland
- District: Tuensang
- Lok Sabha constituency: Nagaland
- Established: 1974
- Total electors: 22,176
- Reservation: ST

Member of Legislative Assembly
- 14th Nagaland Legislative Assembly
- Incumbent Sethrongkyu Sangtam
- Party: BJP
- Elected year: 2023

Longkhim–Chare is one of the 60 Legislative Assembly constituencies of Nagaland state in India.

It is part of Tuensang district and is reserved for candidates belonging to the Scheduled Tribes.

== Members of the Legislative Assembly ==
Year	Member	Party
1974	L. J. Toshi Sangtam	Independent politician
1977	Horangse Sangtam	Independent politician
1982	Horangse Sangtam	Naga National Democratic Party
1987	Thrinimong Sangtam	Independent politician
1989	S. Kyukhangba Sangtam	Indian National Congress
1993	S. Kyukhangba Sangtam	Indian National Congress
1998	S. Kyukhangba Sangtam	Indian National Congress
2003	Imtilemba Sangtam	Bharatiya Janata Party
2008	S. Kyukhangba Sangtam	Indian National Congress
2013	A. Imtilemba Sangtam	Nationalist Congress Party
2018	Muthingnyuba Sangtam	Naga People's Front
2023	Sethrongkyu Sangtam	Bharatiya Janata Party

== Election results ==
=== 2023 Assembly election ===
2023 Nagaland Legislative Assembly election: Longkhim Chare
Party	Candidate	Votes	%	±%
BJP	Sethrongkyu Sangtam	10,187	50.33%	12.65%
NCP	Muthingnyuba Sangtam	8,564	42.31%	
RPI(A)	Sethrichem Sangtam	1,450	7.16%	
NOTA	Nota	38	0.19%	
Margin of victory		1,623	8.02%	−1.31%
Turnout		20,239	91.27%	−2.53%
Registered electors		22,176		4.96%
BJP gain from NPF		Swing	3.33%	

=== 2018 Assembly election ===
2018 Nagaland Legislative Assembly election: Longkhim Chare
Party	Candidate	Votes	%	±%
NPF	Muthingnyuba Sangtam	9,316	47.01%	19.25%
BJP	A. Imtilemba Sangtam	7,468	37.68%	
NPP	T. Cholongse Sangtam	2,971	14.99%	
NOTA	None of the Above	64	0.32%	
Margin of victory		1,848	9.32%	2.05%
Turnout		19,819	93.80%	−4.80%
Registered electors		21,129		3.91%
NPF gain from NCP		Swing	10.73%	

=== 2013 Assembly election ===
2013 Nagaland Legislative Assembly election: Longkhim Chare
Party	Candidate	Votes	%	±%
NCP	A. Imtilemba Sangtam	7,273	36.28%	
INC	Thrinimong Sangtam	5,814	29.00%	−9.88%
NPF	L. T. Sangtam	5,565	27.76%	1.56%
Independent	R. S. Sangtam	1,326	6.61%	
Margin of victory		1,459	7.28%	2.24%
Turnout		20,049	98.60%	1.72%
Registered electors		20,333		2.98%
NCP gain from INC		Swing	-2.60%	

=== 2008 Assembly election ===
2008 Nagaland Legislative Assembly election: Longkhim Chare
Party	Candidate	Votes	%	±%
INC	S. Kyukhangba Sangtam	7,437	38.88%	−10.27%
BJP	Imtilemba Sangtam	6,474	33.84%	−17.01%
NPF	L. T. Sangtam	5,012	26.20%	
Independent	Horangse Sangtam	361	1.89%	
Margin of victory		963	5.03%	3.32%
Turnout		19,130	97.67%	5.04%
Registered electors		19,745		27.77%
INC gain from BJP		Swing	-11.98%	

=== 2003 Assembly election ===
2003 Nagaland Legislative Assembly election: Longkhim Chare
Party	Candidate	Votes	%	±%
BJP	Imtilemba Sangtam	7,211	50.86%	
INC	S. Kyukhangba Sangtam	6,968	49.14%	
Margin of victory		243	1.71%	
Turnout		14,179	91.84%	91.84%
Registered electors		15,454		11.93%
BJP gain from INC		Swing	-9.51%	

=== 1998 Assembly election ===
1998 Nagaland Legislative Assembly election: Longkhim Chare
Party	Candidate	Votes	%	±%
INC	S. Kyukhangba Sangtam	Unopposed		
Registered electors		13,807		13.13%
INC hold		Swing		

=== 1993 Assembly election ===
1993 Nagaland Legislative Assembly election: Longkhim Chare
Party	Candidate	Votes	%	±%
INC	S. Kyukhangba Sangtam	7,302	60.37%	3.13%
NPF	Thrinimong Sangtam	4,794	39.63%	−3.13%
Margin of victory		2,508	20.73%	6.26%
Turnout		12,096	99.42%	3.41%
Registered electors		12,205		38.25%
INC hold		Swing	3.13%	

=== 1989 Assembly election ===
1989 Nagaland Legislative Assembly election: Longkhim Chare
Party	Candidate	Votes	%	±%
INC	S. Kyukhangba Sangtam	4,831	57.24%	31.31%
NPF	Thrinimong Sangtam	3,609	42.76%	
Margin of victory		1,222	14.48%	10.24%
Turnout		8,440	96.01%	1.55%
Registered electors		8,828		0.64%
INC gain from Independent		Swing	27.07%	

=== 1987 Assembly election ===
1987 Nagaland Legislative Assembly election: Longkhim Chare
Party	Candidate	Votes	%	±%
Independent	Thrinimong Sangtam	2,468	30.17%	
INC	S. Kyukhangba Sangtam	2,121	25.93%	−5.22%
NND	Horangse Sangtam	1,421	17.37%	−15.12%
NPP	R. Sethrongchem	1,102	13.47%	
Independent	K. Thronglongse	978	11.95%	
Independent	C. Thridongse	91	1.11%	
Margin of victory		347	4.24%	2.90%
Turnout		8,181	94.46%	8.91%
Registered electors		8,772		−24.85%
Independent gain from NND		Swing	-2.33%	

=== 1982 Assembly election ===
1982 Nagaland Legislative Assembly election: Longkhim Chare
Party	Candidate	Votes	%	±%
NND	Horangse Sangtam	3,215	32.49%	
INC	T. Subengse Sangtam	3,082	31.15%	
Independent	K. Asungba Sangtam	2,572	26.00%	
Independent	R. Sethrougchn	1,025	10.36%	
Margin of victory		133	1.34%	−2.89%
Turnout		9,894	85.55%	−5.43%
Registered electors		11,673		46.55%
NND gain from Independent		Swing	-7.40%	

=== 1977 Assembly election ===
1977 Nagaland Legislative Assembly election: Longkhim Chare
Party	Candidate	Votes	%	±%
Independent	Horangse Sangtam	2,843	39.90%	
UDA	C. Thrinimong	2,541	35.66%	11.10%
Independent	M. Tsubongse Sangtam	1,742	24.45%	
Margin of victory		302	4.24%	0.88%
Turnout		7,126	90.97%	4.22%
Registered electors		7,965		−0.09%
Independent hold		Swing	0.50%	

=== 1974 Assembly election ===
1974 Nagaland Legislative Assembly election: Longkhim Chare
Party	Candidate	Votes	%	±%
Independent	L. J. Toshi Sangtam	2,663	39.40%	
NNO	Horang	2,436	36.04%	
UDA	Tsubongse	1,660	24.56%	
Margin of victory		227	3.36%	
Turnout		6,759	86.75%	
Registered electors		7,972		
Independent win (new seat)				

== See also ==
- List of constituencies of the Nagaland Legislative Assembly
- Tuensang district
