= Tseminyü Assembly constituency =

Legislative Assembly constituency in Nagaland State, India

Coordinates: 25.93°N 94.21°E

Tseminyü
- Constituency No. 12 for the Nagaland Legislative Assembly

Constituency details
- Country: India
- Region: Northeast India
- State: Nagaland
- District: Tseminyü
- Lok Sabha constituency: Nagaland
- Established: 1964
- Total electors: 24,253
- Reservation: ST

Member of Legislative Assembly
- 14th Nagaland Legislative Assembly
- Incumbent Jwenga Seb
- Party: Independent
- Elected year: 2023

Tseminyü is one of the 60 Legislative Assembly constituencies of Nagaland state in India.

It is part of Tseminyü district and is reserved for candidates belonging to the Scheduled Tribes.

== Members of the Legislative Assembly ==
Year	Member	Party
1964	Viyekha	Independent politician
1966 by-election	Riga Thong	Nagaland Nationalist Organisation
1969	Riga Thong	Nagaland Nationalist Organisation
1974	Rushulo	Independent politician
1977	R. S. Rengma	United Democratic Alliance
1982	R. S. Rengma	Naga National Democratic Party
1987	Nillo	Indian National Congress
1989	Khasu	Naga People's Front
1993	Nillo	Indian National Congress
1998	Nillo	Indian National Congress
2003	R. Khing	Janata Dal
2008	R. Khing	Naga People's Front
2013	Er. Levi Rengma	Independent politician
2018	R. Khing	Nationalist Democratic Progressive Party
2023	Jwenga Seb	Janata Dal

== Election results ==
=== 2023 Assembly election ===
2023 Nagaland Legislative Assembly election: Tseminyü
Party	Candidate	Votes	%	±%
JD(U)	Jwenga Seb	8,096	35.90%	35.42%
RPI(A)	Loguseng Semp	5,533	24.54%	
NDPP	R. Khing	4,781	21.20%	−14.85%
Rising People’s Party	Joel Naga	3,718	16.49%	
LJP(RV)	Er. Levi Rengma	352	1.56%	
NOTA	Nota	71	0.31%	
Margin of victory		2,563	11.37%	7.44%
Turnout		22,551	92.98%	2.93%
Registered electors		24,253		−0.65%
JD(U) gain from NDPP		Swing	-0.15%	

=== 2018 Assembly election ===
2018 Nagaland Legislative Assembly election: Tseminyü
Party	Candidate	Votes	%	±%
NDPP	R. Khing	7,925	36.05%	
NPP	Er. Levi Rengma	7,062	32.12%	
NPF	Loguseng Semp	6,871	31.26%	−3.20%
JD(U)	Thapimo Semy	105	0.48%	
NOTA	None of the Above	20	0.09%	
Margin of victory		863	3.93%	0.79%
Turnout		21,983	90.05%	−5.93%
Registered electors		24,411		−4.38%
NDPP gain from Independent		Swing	-1.54%	

=== 2013 Assembly election ===
2013 Nagaland Legislative Assembly election: Tseminyü
Party	Candidate	Votes	%	±%
Independent	Er. Levi Rengma	9,212	37.59%	
NPF	R. Khing	8,444	34.46%	0.68%
INC	Nillo	6,778	27.66%	−5.25%
RJD	T. Sebu	33	0.13%	
NCP	Sajukha Rengma	23	0.09%	
Margin of victory		768	3.13%	2.86%
Turnout		24,504	95.98%	0.51%
Registered electors		25,530		0.20%
Independent gain from NPF		Swing	3.82%	

=== 2008 Assembly election ===
2008 Nagaland Legislative Assembly election: Tseminyü
Party	Candidate	Votes	%	±%
NPF	R. Khing	8,216	33.78%	12.15%
Independent	Er. Levi Rengma	8,150	33.50%	
INC	Nillo	8,006	32.91%	2.02%
Margin of victory		66	0.27%	−7.74%
Turnout		24,325	95.66%	−0.68%
Registered electors		25,479		14.46%
NPF gain from JD(U)		Swing	-5.13%	

=== 2003 Assembly election ===
2003 Nagaland Legislative Assembly election: Tseminyü
Party	Candidate	Votes	%	±%
JD(U)	R. Khing	8,327	38.91%	
INC	Nillo	6,612	30.89%	
NPF	Khasu Kath	4,629	21.63%	
BJP	Johny G. Rengma	1,112	5.20%	
NCP	Chinny Mech	723	3.38%	
Margin of victory		1,715	8.01%	
Turnout		21,403	96.15%	3.96%
Registered electors		22,260		14.32%
JD(U) gain from INC		Swing	-25.34%	

=== 1998 Assembly election ===
1998 Nagaland Legislative Assembly election: Tseminyü
Party	Candidate	Votes	%	±%
INC	Nillo	Unopposed		
Margin of victory				
Registered electors		19,472		36.52%
INC hold		Swing		

=== 1993 Assembly election ===
1993 Nagaland Legislative Assembly election: Tseminyü
Party	Candidate	Votes	%	±%
INC	Nillo	8,369	64.24%	17.62%
NPF	Khasu Kath	4,658	35.76%	−17.62%
Margin of victory		3,711	28.49%	21.73%
Turnout		13,027	92.19%	−2.43%
Registered electors		14,263		64.40%
INC gain from NPF		Swing	10.86%	

=== 1989 Assembly election ===
1989 Nagaland Legislative Assembly election: Tseminyü
Party	Candidate	Votes	%	±%
NPF	Khasu	4,350	53.38%	
INC	Nillo	3,799	46.62%	7.26%
Margin of victory		551	6.76%	−0.77%
Turnout		8,149	94.62%	5.22%
Registered electors		8,676		−0.14%
NPF gain from INC		Swing	14.02%	

=== 1987 Assembly election ===
1987 Nagaland Legislative Assembly election: Tseminyü
Party	Candidate	Votes	%	±%
INC	Nillo	3,019	39.36%	17.98%
NND	R. S. Rengma	2,441	31.82%	5.04%
NPP	Khasu	2,211	28.82%	
Margin of victory		578	7.53%	6.71%
Turnout		7,671	89.40%	6.59%
Registered electors		8,688		−9.09%
INC gain from NND		Swing	12.57%	

=== 1982 Assembly election ===
1982 Nagaland Legislative Assembly election: Tseminyü
Party	Candidate	Votes	%	±%
NND	R. S. Rengma	2,104	26.78%	
Independent	Nillo	2,039	25.95%	
Independent	Thonshi Rengma	2,034	25.89%	
INC	Riga Thong	1,679	21.37%	
Margin of victory		65	0.83%	−6.49%
Turnout		7,856	82.81%	0.17%
Registered electors		9,557		43.80%
NND gain from UDA		Swing	-26.88%	

=== 1977 Assembly election ===
1977 Nagaland Legislative Assembly election: Tseminyü
Party	Candidate	Votes	%	±%
UDA	R. S. Rengma	2,888	53.66%	
NCN	Riga Thong	2,494	46.34%	
Margin of victory		394	7.32%	5.49%
Turnout		5,382	82.64%	−1.62%
Registered electors		6,646		9.80%
UDA gain from Independent		Swing	2.75%	

=== 1974 Assembly election ===
1974 Nagaland Legislative Assembly election: Tseminyü
Party	Candidate	Votes	%	±%
Independent	Rushulo	2,564	50.91%	
NNO	Riga Thong	2,472	49.09%	−4.10%
Margin of victory		92	1.83%	−4.56%
Turnout		5,036	84.26%	−1.58%
Registered electors		6,053		24.65%
Independent gain from NNO		Swing	-2.28%	

=== 1969 Assembly election ===
1969 Nagaland Legislative Assembly election: Tseminyü
Party	Candidate	Votes	%	±%
NNO	Riga Thong	2,217	53.19%	
UDF	Vivekha	1,951	46.81%	
Margin of victory		266	6.38%	
Turnout		4,168	85.83%	
Registered electors		4,856		
NNO hold		Swing		

=== 1966 Assembly by-election ===
1966 Nagaland Legislative Assembly by-election: Tseminyü
Party	Candidate	Votes	%	±%
NNO	Riga Thong	Unopposed		
NNO gain from Independent		Swing		

=== 1964 Assembly election ===
1964 Nagaland Legislative Assembly election: Tseminyü
Party	Candidate	Votes	%	±%
Independent	Viyekha	1,660	65.12%	
Independent	Riga Thong	889	34.88%	
Margin of victory		771	30.25%	
Turnout		2,549	75.57%	
Registered electors		3,373		
Independent win (new seat)				

== See also ==
- List of constituencies of the Nagaland Legislative Assembly
- Tseminyü district
