= Emblem of Nagaland =

Official seal of the government of the Indian state of Nagaland

- Armiger: The Government of Nagaland
- Adopted: 2005
- Shield: Mithun bison proper
- Motto: Unity

The Emblem of Nagaland is the official seal of the government of the Indian state of Nagaland. It was designed by local artist Merimvü Doulo and was officially adopted in August 2005.

== History and background ==
As of 2018, there are no officially recognised flags for the individual states of India, but no constitutional prohibition against displaying such flags so long as the national flag of India is given priority and not dishonoured. Upon its adoption in 2005, the current Nagaland emblem displaced the previous design which featured Ashoka. The Nagaland Legislative Assembly decided on the change to the state's emblem in June 2005. The prior existence of emblems unique to other states was cited as a justification for the new emblem. An article by The Telegraph speculated, per an undisclosed source, that the change was intended to send a message about the desire of the Naga people to unify under a single administrative center. The emblem officially went into effect on 15 August 2005.

== Design ==
The emblem of Nagaland is a circular seal depicting a Mithun (bison) in black-and-white standing on a green hilly landscape, surrounded by the motto "Unity" and the words "Government of Nagaland" in white. When the emblem is printed in colour, the space between inner and outer circular lines of the rim are filled with a coffee colour. The original design included traditional Naga motifs including dao, spear, and log drum, with a shield as a backdrop. It was designed by local artist Merimvü Doulo. According to Duolo, the initial design was completed in only 15 days.

== See also ==
- National Emblem of India
- List of Indian state emblems
