= T. N. Angami =

Former Chief Minister of the state of Nagaland in India

Thepfülo-u Nakhro

2nd Chief Minister of Nagaland
- In office 14 August 1966 – 22 February 1969
- Governor: Vishnu Sahay; Braj Kumar Nehru
- Preceded by: P. Shilu Ao
- Succeeded by: Hokishe Sema

Speaker of Vidhan Sabha, Nagaland
- In office 1 December 1963 – 13 August 1966
- Preceded by: Office Established
- Succeeded by: K. Shikhu

Personal details
- Born: 1913 Jotsoma, Naga Hills District, Assam Province, British India (Now in Kohima District, Nagaland, India)
- Died: 1986 (aged 72–73)
- Party: Naga Nationalist Organisation
- Nickname: T. N. Angami

T. N. Angami (Thepfülo-u Nakhro) (1913 – 1986) was an Indian politician from Nagaland. He was the first Speaker of the Nagaland Legislative Assembly, and later, the second Chief Minister of Nagaland state.

== Early life ==
Thepfülo-u was born the son of V N Angami in Jotsoma village to a wealthy Angami Naga family in 1913. He was schooled in Kohima, Jorhat and Shillong. In 1943 he joined the Indian Army as a store keeper and served during the Second World War. In 1946 he worked in the office of the Deputy commissioner of the Naga Hills District. He worked with the government in various capacities for five years, until he resigned in 1951 to join he Naga National Council. Besides politics, he was actively associated with various religious, social, and welfare organisations of the state.

== Political career ==
Angami began his political life in 1951 when he resigned from his job as an office assistant to join the Naga National Council, an organisation that he went on to head as its president. Later, as the Council under Angami Zapu Phizo took to armed rebellion against the Government of India, Angami opposed Phizo. In 1957 T. N. Angami formed the Reforming Committee of the Naga National Council with the aims of opposing violence, winning over the rebels and restoring peace in Nagaland. In August 1957 the Reforming Committee convened an All Tribes Conference in Kohima that called for the constitution of the Naga Hills District and the Tuensang Division of the North East Frontier Agency into a single administrative division within the Union of India.

=== First speaker ===
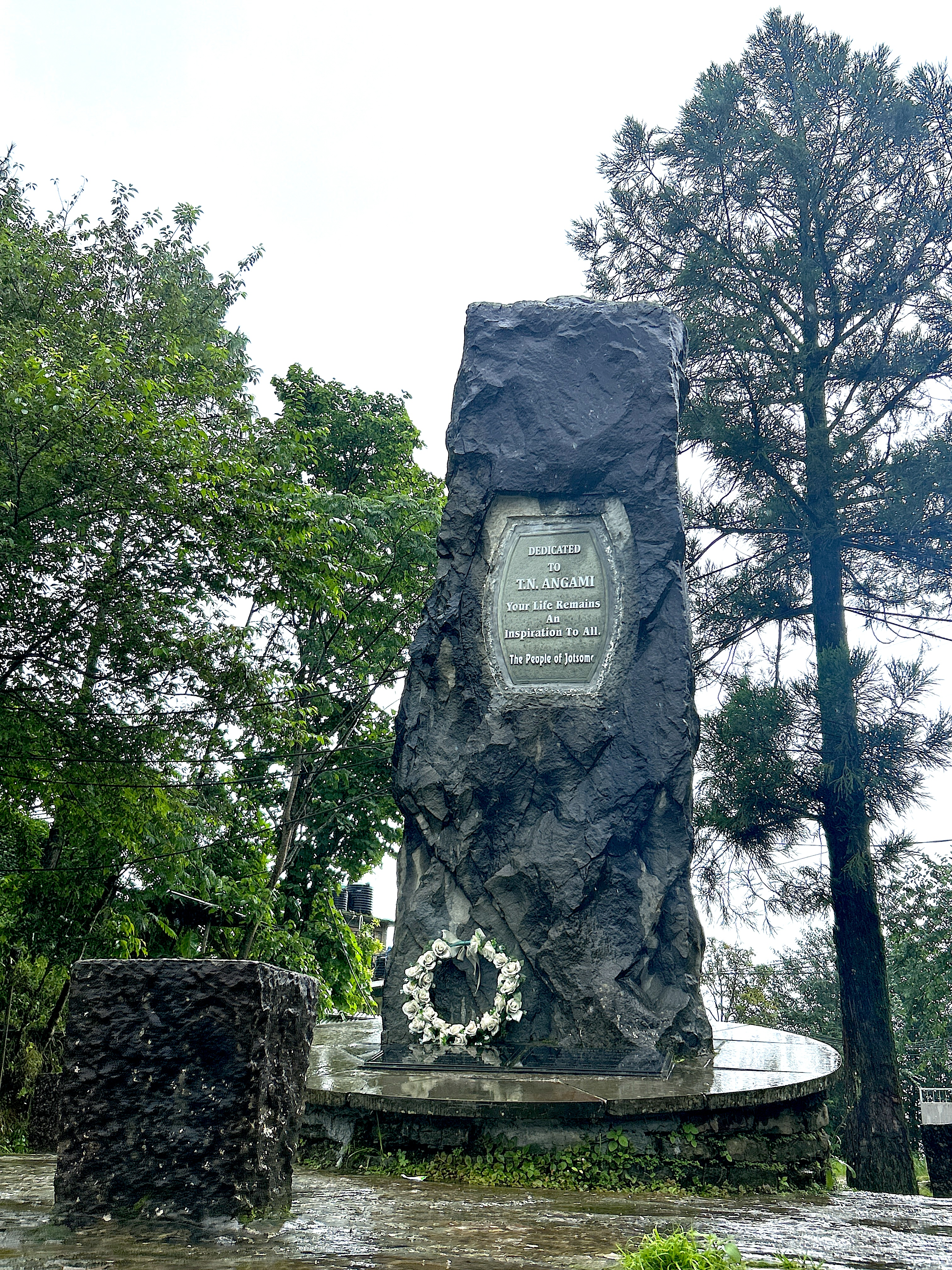
Monolith in honour of T. N. Angami at his native village, Jotsoma

The state of Nagaland was established in 1963 and P. Shilu Ao of the Naga Nationalist Organisation became its first Chief Minister. Following the 1964 Nagaland Legislative Assembly election in 1964, Angami was elected its first Speaker.

=== Second chief minister ===
Following a no confidence motion against the government, Ao resigned as Chief Minister and was succeeded by Angami who served from August 1966 to February 1969. As Chief Minister, he convened a Peace Mission and convinced the Government of India to take a more liberal view of the rebels and to grant them amnesty without preconditions. His efforts resulted in a ceasefire agreement between the Government of India and the Naga rebels. In 1968, Angami made several demands to constitute a boundary commission to settle the border dispute between Nagaland and Assam. He also insisted that his government would not be a party to the creation of the North Eastern Council as the central government decided on it without consultation with Nagaland. In the elections of 1969, the Naga Nationalist Organisation was voted back to power but Angami stepped down as Chief Minister and was succeeded by Hokishe Sema. Later, Angami shifted to the United Democratic Front and then joined the Congress(I).
