= List of deputy chief ministers of Nagaland =

Member of Nagaland government

The deputy chief minister of Nagaland is a member of the Cabinet of Nagaland Government in the Government of Nagaland. Not a constitutional office, it seldom carries any specific powers. In the parliamentary system of government, the chief minister is treated as the "first among equals" in the cabinet; the position of deputy chief minister is used to bring political stability and strength within a coalition government. The position of deputy chief minister is not explicitly defined or mentioned in the Constitution of India. However, the Supreme Court of India has stated that the appointment of deputy chief ministers is not unconstitutional. The court has clarified that a deputy chief minister, for all practical purposes, remains a minister in the council of ministers headed by the chief minister and does not draw a higher salary or perks compared to other ministers.During the absence of the chief minister, the deputy-chief minister may chair cabinet meetings and lead the assembly majority. Various deputy chief ministers have also taken the oath of secrecy in line with the one that chief minister takes. This oath has also sparked controversies.

== List of deputy chief ministers ==
Sr. No.	Name (constituency)	Portrait	Term of office			Political party	Chief Minister	Ref
1	RC Chiten Jamir (Arkakong)		1987	1989	2 years	Indian National Congress	Hokishe Sema	
2	IK Sema		1989	1990	1 year	Nagaland People's Council	Vamuzo	
3	Yanthungo Patton (Tyüi)		8 March 2018	Incumbent	8 years, 200 days	Bharatiya Janata Party	Neiphiu Rio	
4	T. R. Zeliang (Peren)		7 March 2023	Incumbent	3 years, 201 days	Naga People's Front	Neiphiu Rio	

== See also ==
- List of current Indian deputy chief ministers

== Oath as the state deputy chief minister ==
The deputy chief minister serves five years in the office. The following is the oath of the Deputy chief minister of state:

I, <Name of Deputy Chief Minister>, do swear in the name of God/solemnly affirm that I will bear true faith and allegiance to the Constitution of India as by law established, that I will uphold the sovereignty and integrity of India, that I will faithfully and conscientiously discharge my duties as a Minister for the State of () and that I will do right to all manner of people in accordance with the Constitution and the law without fear or favour, affection or ill-will.

Oath of Secrecy

"I, [Name], do swear in the name of God / solemnly affirm that I will not directly or indirectly communicate or reveal to any person or persons any matter which shall be brought under my consideration or shall become known to me as a Minister for the State of [Name of State] except as may be required for the due discharge of my duties as such Minister.
