= S. C. Jamir =

Indian politician

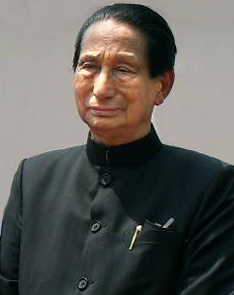

24th Governor of Odisha
- In office 21 March 2013 – 20 March 2018
- Chief Minister: Naveen Patnaik
- Preceded by: M C Bhandare
- Succeeded by: Satya Pal Malik

16th Governor of Maharashtra
- In office 9 March 2008 – 22 January 2010
- Chief Minister: Vilasrao Deshmukh; Ashok Chavan
- Preceded by: S. M. Krishna
- Succeeded by: K. Sankaranarayanan

Governor of Gujarat
- In office 30 July 2009 – 26 November 2009
- Chief Minister: Narendra Modi
- Preceded by: Nawal Kishore Sharma
- Succeeded by: Kamla Beniwal

12th Governor of Goa
- In office 17 July 2004 – 21 July 2008
- Chief Minister: Manohar Parrikar; Pratapsingh Rane; Digambar Kamat
- Preceded by: Mohammed Fazal
- Succeeded by: Shivinder Singh Sidhu

6th Chief Minister of Nagaland
- In office 22 February 1993 – 6 March 2003
- Governor: Lokanath Misra V. K. Nayar Oudh Narayan Shrivastava Om Prakash Sharma Shyamal Datta
- Preceded by: Vamüzo Phesao
- Succeeded by: Neiphiu Rio
- In office 25 January 1989 – 10 May 1990
- Governor: Gopal Singh (politician)M. M. Thomas
- Preceded by: President's rule
- Succeeded by: K. L. Chishi
- In office 18 November 1982 – 28 November 1986
- Governor: S. M. H. Burney K. V. Krishna Rao
- Preceded by: John Bosco Jasokie
- Succeeded by: Hokishe Sema
- In office 18 April 1980 – 5 June 1980
- Governor: Lallan Prasad Singh
- Preceded by: Vizol Koso
- Succeeded by: John Bosco Jasokie

Member of Parliament, Rajya Sabha
- In office 2 July 1987 – 2 April 1992
- Constituency: Nagaland

Member of Parliament, Lok Sabha
- In office 4 March 1967 – 27 December 1970
- Preceded by: Constituency Established
- Succeeded by: Kevichüsa Angami
- Constituency: Nagaland

Parliamentary Secretary
- In office 5 May 1962 – 15 January 1966
- Appointed by: Jawaharlal Nehru
- Prime Minister: Jawaharlal Nehru

Personal details
- Born: Senayangba Chubatoshi Jamir; 17 October 1931 (age 94) Ungma, Naga Hills District, Assam Province, British India (Now in Mokokchung District, Nagaland, India)
- Party: Indian National Congress
- Other political affiliations: United Democratic Front—Progressive
- Spouse: Imkonglemla (m. 1958)
- Children: 5 including C. Apok Jamir
- Parent(s): Senayangba Jamir, Takatula
- Education: Scottish Church College, Kolkata; Allahabad University; University of Cambodia

Senayangba Chubatoshi Jamir (born 17 October 1931) is an Indian politician and former Chief Minister of Nagaland. He was Parliamentary Secretary to Jawaharlal Nehru and Deputy Minister under Indira Gandhi. He also served on various gubernatorial positions, such as in Odisha, Maharashtra, Gujarat, and Goa. He was awarded the Padma Bhushan, the third-highest civilian award in India, in 2020.

== Early life ==
Chubatoshi Jamir was born on 17 October 1931 to Senayangba Jamir and Takatula of Ungma Village. Jamir is the grandson of Jungshinokdang who in the late 19th century had met the American Christian Missionary Rev. Edwin W. Clark. He did his early education in Mokokchung, at Kolkata's Scottish Church College for his intermediate in arts, and higher studies at Allahabad University from where he subsequently obtained his B.A. and LL.B. degrees.

== Political career ==
Jamir was a member of the negotiation body that held talks with Prime Minister Jawaharlal Nehru in 1960 leading to the establishment of Nagaland as a state within India. He was one of the signatories of the 16-Point Agreement which brought about the creation of Nagaland state and is today considered as one of the architects of modern Nagaland.

=== Member of Parliament ===
Jamir was nominated as the first Lok Sabha Member from the state of Nagaland in year 1961. From 1961 to 1970, he served as Member of Parliament and during this period he also served as the Union Deputy Minister of Railways, Labour & Rehabilitation, from 1968 to 1970, and also served as the Union Deputy Minister of Community Development & Cooperation, Food and Agriculture. He was appointed the Parliamentary Secretary to Jawaharlal Nehru, then Prime Minister who was also in charge of the Ministry of External Affairs. He was a member of a UN delegation in 1962.

Having won the previous terms as Member of Parliament uncontested, Jamir faced the electorate in the 1971 Indian general election pitted against Kevichüsa Angami from the newly formed United Front of Nagaland. Jamir was nominated as the candidate of the Naga Nationalist Organisation. In addition to the pledge towards effective measures for the early implementation of unimplemented clauses of the 16 point agreement, the party manifesto said,

...the Naga problem was essentially a political one and a satisfactory settlement acceptable to all sections of Naga people and the Union Government was the only solution. The underground Nagas were an inalienable part of Naga society and they should be associated in the final settlement of the Naga political problem.

The incumbent Deputy Minister of Labour in the Indira Gandhi government was easily defeated by Kevichüsa. In response to his defeat by a novice in electoral politics, Jamir said,

The real cause for this election debacle was the activities of the army in the state and the tantalising offer made by the Opposition candidate to bring independence to Nagaland within a six-month period together with non-compliance of the Government of India with some of the legitimate demands of the ruling party in the State such as vesting the State Government with responsibility of law and order, refusal to give the State a separate Governor, non-integration of continuous Naga areas with Nagaland as demanded by State Government and lack of progress in respect of establishing permanent peace. The seductive calmness that has descended over our state is misleading. Peace hangs by a fragile thread.

=== Nagaland State Legislature ===
In October 1972, Jamir was arrested along with former Nagaland Chief Minister T. N. Angami, and others on charges of complicity in the assassination attempt on Hokishe Sema in August. The incumbent Chief Minister Hokishe Sema refused to set up an enquiry committee to investigate the details that led to the arrest. Jamir along with others were released when the police could not find sufficient evidence to press charges. Jamir alleged that the confessional statement that led to his arrest was "prepared" by some interested officials "to meet their selfish end."

Jamir served as Chief Minister of Nagaland five times (1980, 1982–1986, 1989–90 and 1993–2003). For his first two terms he was a member of the Progressive United Democratic Front, but by 1989 his party had merged with the Indian National Congress. He was a member of the Rajya Sabha from Nagaland for the term 1987–1992, but resigned in 1989.

During the 1991 Indian general election, Jamir directly blamed the incumbent Nagaland Chief Minister Vamüzo Phesao for the ban imposed on National Socialist Council of Nagaland (NSCN), suggesting that it could not have been promulgated without the consultation of the state government. The central government headed by Vishwanath Pratap Singh had outlawed the NSCN along with United Liberation Front of Asom on 28 November 1990. Vamüzo denied that he was ever consulted on the matter. On another occasion, Jamir reteriated that the Naga political problem needed all sections of the Naga people to come together for a durable solution. "No solution was possible through a piecemeal approach," he added.

In 1997, during an interview with Nirmaiya Banerjee of the Times of India, Jamir asserted that peace talks with Naga underground groups would be successful only if the Central Government negotiates with all groups. He said,

Those who understand the reality of the situation in Nagaland will understand that [only] talking to the Isak-Muivah faction of the National Socialist Council of Nagaland will not help. All groups must be invited.

In his opinion, all Naga tribes residing in Nagaland must have a say irrespective of their population. Discussions between different sections of the Naga society should be encouraged.

=== Assassination attempt ===
Two men shot at Jamir in Nagaland House, Delhi on 19 November 1992. Five empty shells were recovered from the spot. He was rushed to the All India Institutes of Medical Sciences where he was admitted into the intensive care unit. This was the third attempt at his life within a year. Several students from Northeast India studying in Delhi were harassed by the police thereafter in the course of the investigation. Students from the Tangkhul Naga community were singled out for special attention. At a press conference, representatives from the Naga People's Movement for Human Rights (NPMHR) and the People's Union for Democratic Rights (PUDR) alleged that the police were harassing students, ordering them to report at the police station, detaining them, searching their rooms, and confiscating their belonging. Hence, some of the students had returned home while the landlords of others were asking them to leave.

== Gubernatorial positions ==
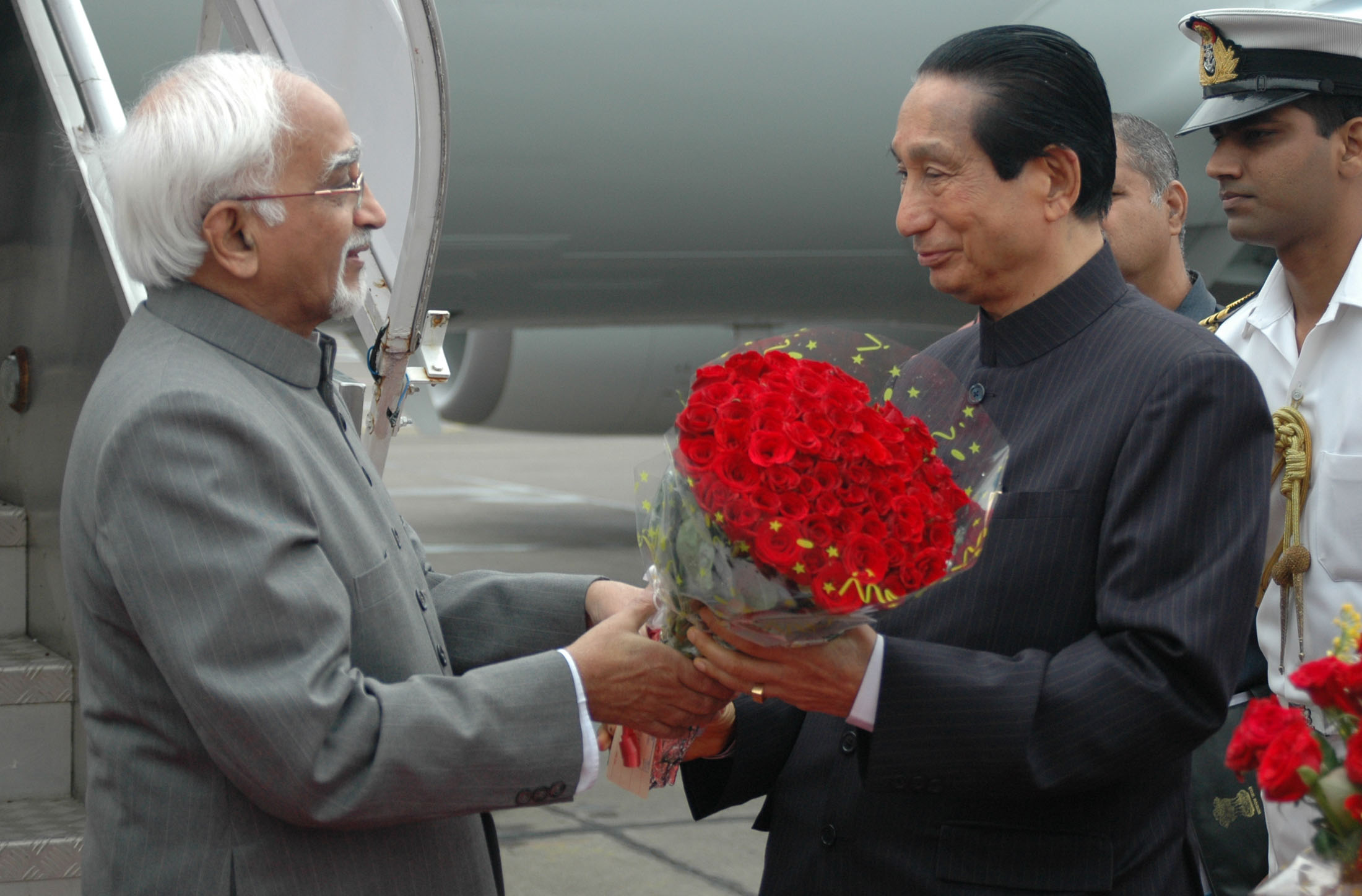
Then Vice President, Mohammad Hamid Ansari being received by S.C. Jamir, the Governor of Maharashtra, on his arrival at Mumbai Airport in August 2009.

Jamir served as Governor of Goa from July 2004 to July 2008.

Following the resignation of Maharashtra Governor S. M. Krishna, on 6 March 2008, President Pratibha Patil asked Jamir to temporarily take the additional charge of Maharashtra. Jamir was formally appointed Governor of Maharashtra on 8 July 2008, while Shivinder Singh Sidhu was appointed to succeed him in Goa. Jamir was sworn in as Governor of Maharashtra on 19 July 2008. In July 2009 he additionally took charge of Gujarat state during the medical absence and subsequent death of Governor-designate Devendra Nath Dwivedi.

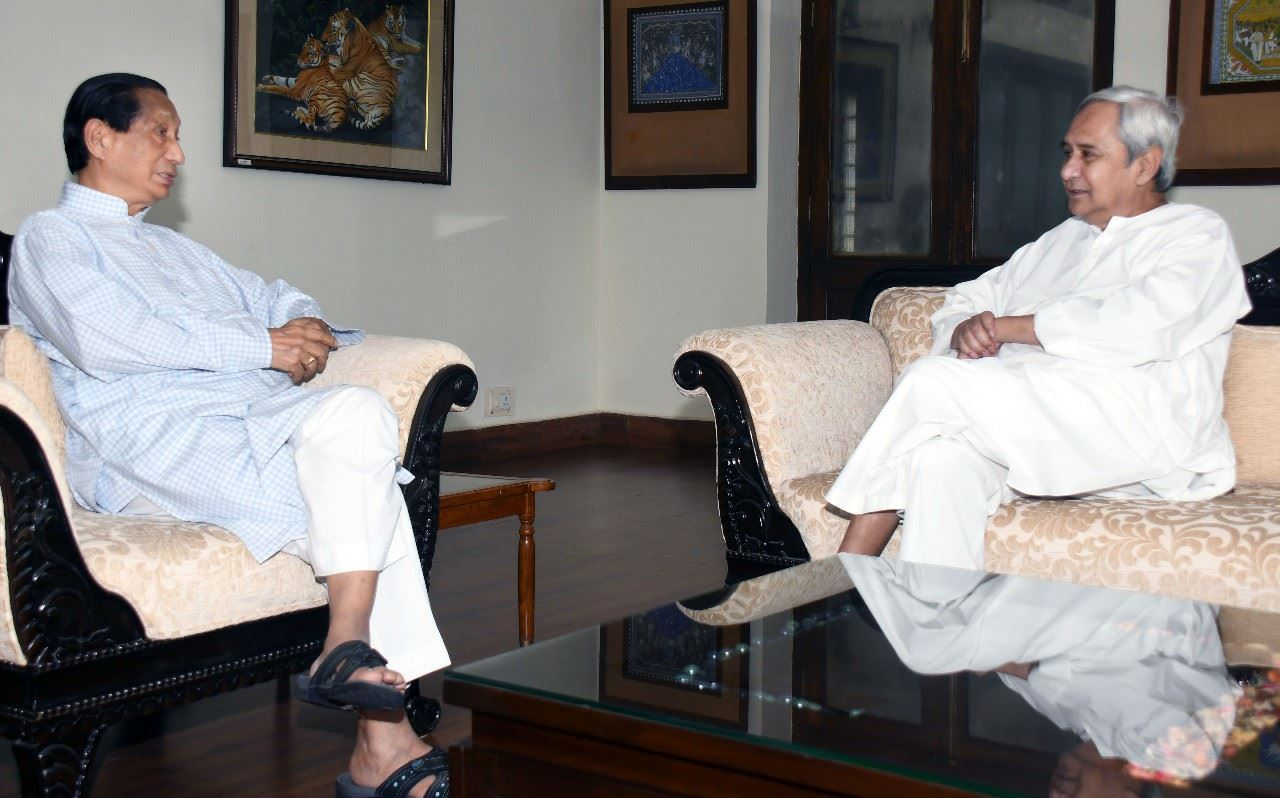
Chief Minister of Odisha, Naveen Patnaik meeting Jamir as the Governor of Odisha.

On 9 March 2013, he was appointed Governor of Odisha.

== Nagaland lottery scam ==
During his tenure as Chief Minister, the Comptroller and Auditor General (CAG) unearthed a major financial scandal in the Nagaland state lottery amounting to ₹38,297 crore. The entire scam took place between October 1993 and November 1997. Jamir denied his government's involvement in the financial scandal but the special audit by the Comptroller and Auditor General (CAG), ordered by the Union Home Ministry, indicted both the Nagaland Government and the state's sole distributor of tickets, M.S Associates, for defrauding the public as well as the exchequer of the amount in July 1999. This case continues to be pending in the court till date.

== Personal life ==
Jamir married Imkonglemla, daughter of Senkalemba in 1958 and they have five children. His younger daughter died in 1996, while his mother died in 2016, at the age of 101. His son, Chubatoshi Apok Jamir is also a politician in the Indian National Congress.

He was conferred an honorary doctorate from the University of Cambodia in 2017. In 2020 Jamir was conferred with the third highest civilian award—Padma Bhushan—in the field of public affairs.

Political offices
Preceded by Vizol Koso	Chief Minister of Nagaland; 18 April 1980 – 5 June 1980	Succeeded by John Bosco Jasokie
Preceded by John Bosco Jasokie	Chief Minister of Nagaland; 18 November 1982 – 28 October 1986	Succeeded by Hokishe Sema
Preceded by President's rule	Chief Minister of Nagaland; 25 January 1989 – 10 May 1990	Succeeded by K. L. Chishi
Preceded by President's rule	Chief Minister of Nagaland; 22 February 1993 – 6 March 2003	Succeeded by Neiphiu Rio
Preceded by Mohammed Fazal	Governor of Goa; 17 July 2004 – 21 July 2008	Succeeded by Shivinder Singh Sidhu
Preceded by S. M. Krishna	Governor of Maharashtra; 9 March 2008 – 22 January 2010	Succeeded by K. Sankaranarayanan
Preceded by Nawal Kishore Sharma	Governor of Gujarat; 30 July 2009 – 26 November 2009 (Additional Charge)	Succeeded by Kamla Beniwal
Preceded by Murlidhar Chandrakant Bhandare	Governor of Odisha; 21 March 2013 – 20 March 2018	Succeeded by Satya Pal Malik (Additional Charge)
