= Chief Minister of Nagaland =

Head of executive in Nagaland, India

- Emblem of Nagaland

- Flag of India

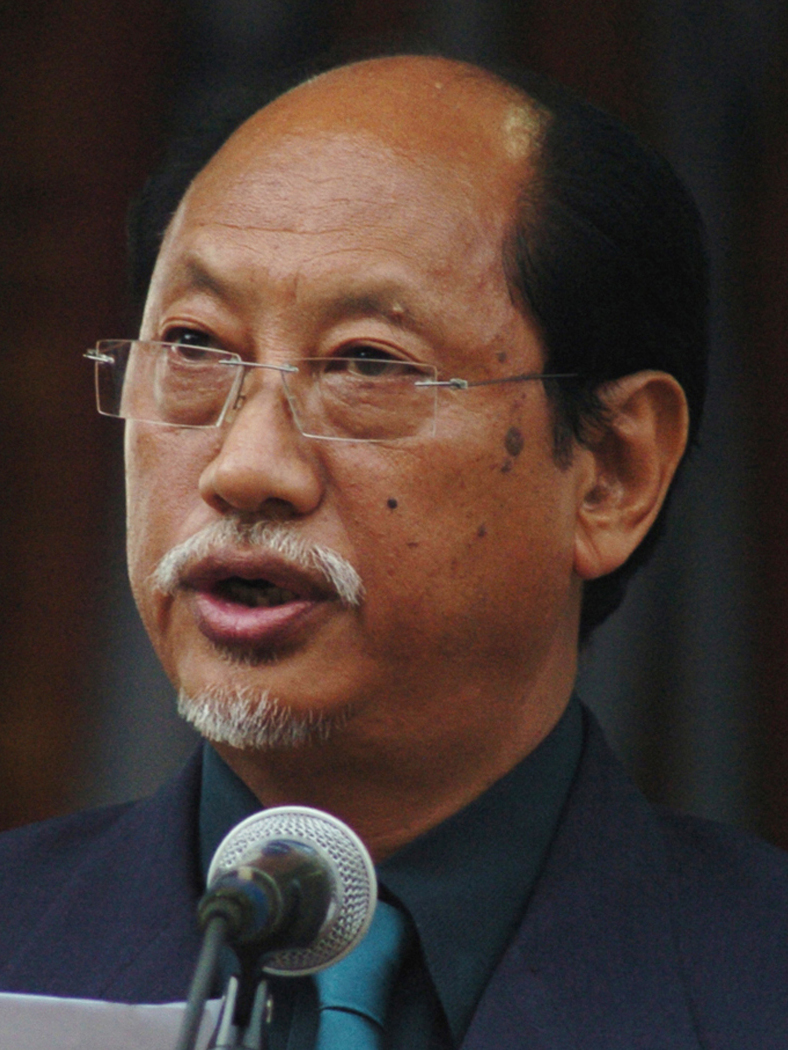
- Incumbent; Neiphiu Rio since 8 March 2018
- Style: The Honourable (formal); Mr. Chief Minister (informal)
- Status: Head of Government
- Abbreviation: CM
- Member of: Nagaland Legislative Assembly& Nagaland Council of Ministers
- Reports to: Governor of Nagaland
- Appointer: Governor of Nagaland
- Term length: At the confidence of the assembly Chief minister's term is for five years and is subject to no term limits.
- Inaugural holder: P. Shilu Ao
- Formation: 1 December 1963 (62 years ago)
- Deputy: Deputy Chief Minister of Nagaland
- Salary: ₹110,000 (US$1,100) (
- Website: chiefminister.nagaland.gov.in

The Chief Minister of Nagaland is the chief executive of the Indian state of Nagaland. As per the Constitution of India, the governor is a state's de jure head, but de facto executive authority rests with the chief minister. Following elections to the Nagaland Legislative Assembly, the state's governor usually invites the party (or coalition) with a majority of seats to form the government. The governor appoints the chief minister, whose council of ministers are collectively responsible to the assembly. Given that he has the confidence of the assembly, the chief minister's term is for five years and is subject to no term limits.

Since 1963, eleven people belonging to seven parties have served as chief minister of Nagaland. The first three belonged to the Nagaland Nationalist Organisation, including the inaugural officeholder P. Shilu Ao. The current incumbent is Neiphiu Rio of the Naga People's Front, in office since 8 March 2018.

== Oath as the state chief minister ==
The chief minister serves five years in the office. The following is the oath of the chief minister of state:

I, <Name of Chief Minister>, do swear in the name of God/solemnly affirm that I will bear true faith and allegiance to the Constitution of India as by law established, that I will uphold the sovereignty and integrity of India, that I will faithfully and conscientiously discharge my duties as a Minister for the State of () and that I will do right to all manner of people in accordance with the Constitution and the law without fear or favour, affection or ill-will.

Oath of Secrecy

"I, [Name], do swear in the name of God / solemnly affirm that I will not directly or indirectly communicate or reveal to any person or persons any matter which shall be brought under my consideration or shall become known to me as a Minister for the State of [Name of State] except as may be required for the due discharge of my duties as such Minister."

== Chief Ministers of Nagaland (1963-present) ==
- ^{†} Died in office
- ^{§} Returned to office after a previous non-consecutive term

#	Portrait	Chief Minister (born – died) Constituency)	Election (Assembly)	Tenure in office			Party	Ministry
#	Portrait	Chief Minister (born – died) Constituency)	Election (Assembly)	From	To	Time in office	Party	Ministry
1		P. Shilu Ao (1916–1988); MLA for Impur	–	1 December 1963	14 August 1966	2 years, 256 days	Nagaland Nationalist Organisation	Shilu I
1		P. Shilu Ao (1916–1988); MLA for Impur	1964 (1st)	1 December 1963	14 August 1966	2 years, 256 days	Nagaland Nationalist Organisation	Shilu II
2		Thepfülo-u Nakhro (1913–1986); MLA for Western Angami	1964 (1st)	14 August 1966	22 February 1969	2 years, 192 days	Nagaland Nationalist Organisation	Nakhro
3		Hokishe Sema (1921–2007); MLA for Akuluto	1969 (2nd)	22 February 1969	26 February 1974	5 years, 4 days	Nagaland Nationalist Organisation	Sema I
4		Vizol Angami (1914–2008); MLA for Southern Angami II	1974 (3rd)	26 February 1974	10 March 1975	1 year, 12 days	United Democratic Front	Angami I
5		John Bosco Jasokie (1927–2005); MLA for Kohima Town	1974 (3rd)	10 March 1975	20 March 1975	10 days	Naga National Democratic Party	Jasokie I
Position vacant (20 March 1975 – 25 November 1977); President's rule was imposed during this period (Note: When President's rule is in force in a state, its council of ministers stands dissolved. The office of chief minister thus lies vacant. At times, the legislative assembly also stands dissolved.)
(4)		Vizol Angami (1914–2008); MLA for Southern Angami II	1977 (4th)	25 November 1977^{[§]}	18 April 1980	2 years, 145 days	United Democratic Front	Angami II
6		S. C. Jamir (born 1931); MLA for Aonglenden	1977 (4th)	18 April 1980	5 June 1980	48 days	United Democratic Front-Progressive	Jamir I
(5)		John Bosco Jasokie (1927–2005); MLA for Kohima Town	1977 (4th)	5 June 1980^{[§]}	18 November 1982	2 years, 166 days	Naga National Democratic Party	Jasokie II
(6)		S. C. Jamir (born 1931); MLA for Aonglenden	1982 (5th)	18 November 1982^{[§]}	28 October 1986	3 years, 344 days	United Democratic Front-Progressive	Jamir II
(3)		Hokishe Sema (1921–2007); MLA for Dimapur I	1982 (5th)	28 October 1986^{[§]}	7 August 1988	1 year, 284 days	Indian National Congress	Sema II
(3)		Hokishe Sema (1921–2007); MLA for Dimapur I	1987 (6th)	28 October 1986^{[§]}	7 August 1988	1 year, 284 days	Indian National Congress	Sema III
Position vacant (7 August 1988 – 25 January 1989); President's rule was imposed during this period
(6)		S. C. Jamir (born 1931); MLA for Mokokchung Town	1989 (7th)	25 January 1989^{[§]}	10 May 1990	1 year, 105 days	Indian National Congress	Jamir III
7		K. L. Chishi (born 1944); MLA for Atoizü	1989 (7th)	16 May 1990	19 June 1990	34 days	Indian National Congress	Chishi
8		Vamüzo Phesao (1938–2000); MLA for Chozuba	1989 (7th)	19 June 1990	2 April 1992	1 year, 288 days	Nagaland People's Council	Phesao
Position vacant (2 April 1992 – 22 February 1993); President's rule was imposed during this period
(6)		S. C. Jamir (born 1931); MLA for Aonglenden	1993 (8th)	22 February 1993^{[§]}	6 March 2003	10 years, 12 days	Indian National Congress	Jamir IV
(6)		S. C. Jamir (born 1931); MLA for Aonglenden	1998 (9th)	22 February 1993^{[§]}	6 March 2003	10 years, 12 days	Indian National Congress	Jamir V
7		Neiphiu Rio (born 1950); MLA for Northern Angami II	2003 (10th)	6 March 2003	3 January 2008	4 years, 303 days	Naga People's Front	Rio I
Position vacant (3 January – 12 March 2008); President's rule was imposed during this period
(7)		Neiphiu Rio (born 1950); MLA for Northern Angami II	2008 (11th)	12 March 2008^{[§]}	24 May 2014	6 years, 73 days	Naga People's Front	Rio II
(7)		Neiphiu Rio (born 1950); MLA for Northern Angami II	2013 (12th)	12 March 2008^{[§]}	24 May 2014	6 years, 73 days	Naga People's Front	Rio III
8		T. R. Zeliang (born 1952); MLA for Peren	2013 (12th)	24 May 2014	22 February 2017	2 years, 274 days	Naga People's Front	Zeliang I
9		Shürhozelie Liezietsu (born 1936); MLA for Northern Angami I	2013 (12th)	22 February 2017	19 July 2017	147 days	Naga People's Front	Liezietsu
(8)		T. R. Zeliang (born 1952); MLA for Peren	2013 (12th)	19 July 2017^{[§]}	8 March 2018	232 days	Naga People's Front	Zeliang II
(7)		Neiphiu Rio (born 1950); MLA for Northern Angami II	2018 (13th)	8 March 2018^{[§]}	Incumbent	8 years, 183 days	Nationalist Democratic Progressive Party	Rio IV
(7)		Neiphiu Rio (born 1950); MLA for Northern Angami II	2023 (14th)	8 March 2018^{[§]}	Incumbent	8 years, 183 days	Nationalist Democratic Progressive Party	Rio V
(7)		Neiphiu Rio (born 1950); MLA for Northern Angami II	2023 (14th)	8 March 2018^{[§]}	Incumbent	8 years, 183 days	Naga People's Front	Rio V

== Statistics ==
=== List by chief minister ===
#	Chief Minister	Party	Term of office	
#	Chief Minister	Party	Longest continuous term	Total duration of chief ministership
1	Neiphiu Rio	NPF/NDPP	8 years, 183 days	19 years, 194 days
2	S. C. Jamir	INC/UDF-P	10 years, 12 days	15 years, 144 days
3	Hokishe Sema	NNO/INC	5 years, 4 days	6 years, 287 days
4	Vizol Angami	UDF-N	2 years, 145 days	3 years, 157 days
5	T. R. Zeliang	NPF	2 years, 274 days	3 years, 141 days
6	P. Shilu Ao	NNO	2 years, 256 days	2 years, 256 days
7	Thepfülo-u Nakhro	NNO	2 years, 192 days	2 years, 192 days
8	John Bosco Jasokie	NND	2 years, 166 days	2 years, 176 days
9	Vamüzo Phesao	NPF	1 year, 287 days	1 year, 287 days
10	Shürhozelie Liezietsu	NPF	147 days	147 days
11	K. L. Chishi	INC	34 days	34 days

== Notes ==
Footnotes
