= Dimapur I Assembly constituency =

Legislative Assembly constituency in Nagaland State, India

Coordinates: 25.93°N 93.78°E

Dimapur I
- Constituency No. 1 for the Nagaland Legislative Assembly

Constituency details
- Country: India
- Region: Northeast India
- State: Nagaland
- District: Dimapur
- Lok Sabha constituency: Nagaland
- Established: 1974
- Total electors: 25,244
- Reservation: None

Member of Legislative Assembly
- 14th Nagaland Legislative Assembly
- Incumbent Tovihoto Ayemi
- Party: Bharatiya Janata Party
- Elected year: 2023

Dimapur I Assembly constituency is one of the 60 Legislative Assembly constituencies of Nagaland state in India. It is part of Dimapur district and is part of Nagaland Lok Sabha constituency.

== Members of the Legislative Assembly ==
Year	Member	Party
1974	Mhaile Peseyie	Indian National Congress
1977	Md. Anwar Hussain	Indian National Congress
1982	Md. Anwar Hussain	Indian National Congress
1986^	Hokishe Sema	Indian National Congress
1987	Hokishe Sema	Indian National Congress
1989	Vikheshe Sema	Indian National Congress
1993	I. Vikheshe	Independent politician
1998	I. Vikheshe	Indian National Congress
2003	Hokishe Sema	Bharatiya Janata Party
2007^	Atomi	Naga People's Front
2008	K. L. Chishi	Indian National Congress
2013	Tovihoto Ayemi	Naga People's Front
2018	Tovihoto Ayemi	Bharatiya Janata Party
2023	Tovihoto Ayemi	Bharatiya Janata Party

^by-election

== Election results ==
Vote share of winning candidates
2023	67.01%
2018	63.53%
2013	42.93%
2008	60.28%
2003	52.70%
1993	44.00%
1989	66.28%
1987	55.44%
1982	42.68%
1977	39.85%
1974	65.00%

=== Assembly Election 2023 ===
2023 Nagaland Legislative Assembly election: Dimapur I
Party	Candidate	Votes	%	±%
BJP	Tovihoto Ayemi	13,325	67.01	3.48
INC	Kewekhape Therie	6,366	32.01	24.45
NOTA	Nota	195	0.98	−0.18
Margin of victory		6,959	34.99	−0.78
Turnout		19,886	78.78	−2.12
Registered electors		25,244		10.68
BJP hold		Swing	3.48	

=== Assembly Election 2018 ===
2018 Nagaland Legislative Assembly election: Dimapur I
Party	Candidate	Votes	%	±%
BJP	Tovihoto Ayemi	11,721	63.53	
NPF	Pukhavi Yepthomi	5,121	27.75	−15.17
INC	W. Kholie Kapfo	1,395	7.56	−24.02
NOTA	None of the Above	214	1.16	
Margin of victory		6,600	35.77	24.42
Turnout		18,451	80.90	−0.58
Registered electors		22,808		14.76
BJP gain from NPF		Swing	20.60	

=== Assembly Election 2013 ===
2013 Nagaland Legislative Assembly election: Dimapur I
Party	Candidate	Votes	%	±%
NPF	Tovihoto Ayemi	6,952	42.93	9.85
INC	K. L. Chishi	5,114	31.58	−28.70
Independent	Pukhavi Yepthomi	3,673	22.68	
Independent	H. Sunep Phom	449	2.77	
Margin of victory		1,838	11.35	−15.85
Turnout		16,194	81.48	0.81
Registered electors		19,875		11.09
NPF gain from INC		Swing	-17.35	

=== Assembly Election 2008 ===
2008 Nagaland Legislative Assembly election: Dimapur I
Party	Candidate	Votes	%	±%
INC	K. L. Chishi	8,700	60.28	31.59
NPF	Atomi	4,774	33.08	21.79
Independent	R.S. Sangtam	768	5.32	
JD(U)	Zeneisele	220	1.52	
Margin of victory		3,926	27.20	3.19
Turnout		14,433	80.83	14.56
Registered electors		17,891		−16.83
INC gain from BJP		Swing	7.58	

=== Assembly Election 2003 ===
2003 Nagaland Legislative Assembly election: Dimapur I
Party	Candidate	Votes	%	±%
BJP	Hokishe Sema	7,494	52.70	
INC	Kevi Zakiesatuo	4,080	28.69	
NPF	T. Chuba	1,605	11.29	
Independent	Kakugha Zhimomi	691	4.86	
JD(U)	Joseph Sema	351	2.47	
Margin of victory		3,414	24.01	
Turnout		14,221	66.11	−19.35
Registered electors		21,512		−14.63
BJP gain from INC		Swing	8.70	

=== Assembly Election 1998 ===
1998 Nagaland Legislative Assembly election: Dimapur I
Party	Candidate	Votes	%	±%
INC	I. Vikheshe	Unopposed		
Registered electors		25,200		22.66
INC gain from Independent		Swing		

=== Assembly Election 1993 ===
1993 Nagaland Legislative Assembly election: Dimapur I
Party	Candidate	Votes	%	±%
Independent	I. Vikheshe	7,573	44.00	
INC	Hokishe Sema	7,436	43.20	−23.08
BJP	N. C. Zeliang	1,160	6.74	
NPF	P. Pius Lotha	1,001	5.82	−21.63
Margin of victory		137	0.80	−38.04
Turnout		17,212	85.46	27.45
Registered electors		20,545		−34.70
Independent gain from INC		Swing	-22.29	

=== Assembly Election 1989 ===
1989 Nagaland Legislative Assembly election: Dimapur I
Party	Candidate	Votes	%	±%
INC	Vikheshe Sema	11,719	66.28	10.84
NPF	Manik Bhattacharjee	4,852	27.44	
Independent	Zhukiye Sema	1,109	6.27	
Margin of victory		6,867	38.84	11.79
Turnout		17,680	58.01	−5.37
Registered electors		31,463		0.03
INC hold		Swing	10.84	

=== Assembly Election 1987 ===
1987 Nagaland Legislative Assembly election: Dimapur I
Party	Candidate	Votes	%	±%
INC	Hokishe Sema	10,790	55.44	12.76
Independent	Crellan Pesyie	5,525	28.39	
NND	N. Ghoshito Sema	2,443	12.55	
Independent	Zhukiye Sema	704	3.62	
Margin of victory		5,265	27.05	15.69
Turnout		19,462	63.38	14.84
Registered electors		31,454		39.73
INC hold		Swing	12.76	

=== Assembly Election 1982 ===
1982 Nagaland Legislative Assembly election: Dimapur I
Party	Candidate	Votes	%	±%
INC	Md. Anwar Hussain	4,554	42.68	2.83
NND	Chhlie Kevichhsa	3,342	31.32	
Independent	N. Choshito Achumi	1,821	17.07	
Independent	T. S. Meren	952	8.92	
Margin of victory		1,212	11.36	3.43
Turnout		10,669	48.55	−11.78
Registered electors		22,511		117.35
INC hold		Swing	2.83	

=== Assembly Election 1977 ===
1977 Nagaland Legislative Assembly election: Dimapur I
Party	Candidate	Votes	%	±%
INC	Awar Hussain	2,421	39.85	
UDA	Chalie Kevichusa	1,939	31.92	
Independent	N. Pesyie	1,122	18.47	
Independent	N. Ghoshita Achumi	278	4.58	
NCN	Assamwati Longkumar	208	3.42	
Independent	B. S. Sharma	107	1.76	
Margin of victory		482	7.93	−22.07
Turnout		6,075	60.33	10.89
Registered electors		10,357		−10.57
INC gain from NNO		Swing	-25.15	

=== Assembly Election 1974 ===
1974 Nagaland Legislative Assembly election: Dimapur I
Party	Candidate	Votes	%	±%
NNO	Mhaile Peseyie Gobinda	3,603	65.00	
UDA	Gobinda Ch. Paira	1,940	35.00	
Margin of victory		1,663	30.00	
Turnout		5,543	49.43	
Registered electors		11,581		
NNO win (new seat)				

== See also ==
- List of constituencies of the Nagaland Legislative Assembly
- Dimapur district
- Dimapur
- Nagaland (Lok Sabha constituency)
