= Wangpang Konyak =

Indian politician

Wangpang Konyak is an Indian politician from Naga People's Front who won 2023 Nagaland by-poll for Nagaland Legislative Assembly with 10,053 votes from Tapi Assembly constituency.
