= Küdecho Khamo =

Indian politician

- 07 March 2023 – Incumbent: CAWD & Taxes Advisor

Personal details
- Party: Naga People's Front
- Other political affiliations: NDPP
- Occupation: Politician & Entrepreneur

Küdecho Khamo is an Indian politician and a Member of the Nagaland Legislative Assembly from Chozuba Assembly constituency since 2023. He belongs to Phüsachodü village, Phek District, Nagaland. He is the Chief Minister's Advisor on Civil Administration Works Division (CAWD) and Taxes. He is also the Nagaland Wushu President.
