= Kazheto Kinimi =

Indian politician (born 1954)

Member of the Nagaland Legislative Assembly

Kazheto Kinimi (born 6 August 1954) is an Indian politician of Bharatiya Janata Party, Nagaland. He is currently serving as a member of Nagaland Legislative Assembly from Akuluto Assembly constituency, which is reserved for candidates from the Scheduled Tribes.
