= Sharingain Longkümer =

Indian politician

Speaker of Nagaland Legislative Assembly
- Incumbent
- Assumed office 7 February 2020
- Chief Minister: Neiphiu Rio
- Deputy Speaker: S. Tohio Yepto (since February 2024)
- Preceded by: Vikho-o Yhoshü

Member of Nagaland Legislative Assembly
- Incumbent
- Assumed office 2019
- Preceded by: Imtikümzük Longkümer
- Constituency: Aonglenden

Personal details
- Born: 30 December 1981 (age 44)
- Party: Naga People's Front
- Education: Hindu College, Delhi (BA, 2004); University of Delhi (LLB, 2010)
- Occupation: Business, social worker

Sharingain Longkümer (born 30 December 1981) is an Indian politician from Nagaland. He is the Speaker of Nagaland Legislative Assembly since February 2020. He was elected to the Nagaland Legislative Assembly from Aonglenden in the by-election in 2019 as a member of the Nationalist Democratic Progressive Party.

== Personal life ==
Sharingain Longkumer was born to I. Nungshizenba Longkumer. He graduated with a Bachelor of Arts from Hindu College, Delhi in 2004 and later an LLB from Delhi University in 2010.
