= Tyüi Assembly constituency =

Legislative Assembly constituency in Nagaland State, India

Coordinates: 26.04°N 94.26°E

Tyüi
- Constituency No. 37 for the Nagaland Legislative Assembly

Constituency details
- Country: India
- Region: Northeast India
- State: Nagaland
- District: Wokha
- Lok Sabha constituency: Nagaland
- Established: 1964
- Total electors: 25,750
- Reservation: ST

Member of Legislative Assembly
- 14th Nagaland Legislative Assembly
- Incumbent Yanthungo Patton
- Party: Bharatiya Janata Party

Tyüi is one of the 60 Legislative Assembly constituencies of Nagaland state in India.

It is part of Wokha district and is reserved for candidates belonging to the Scheduled Tribes.

== Members of the Legislative Assembly ==
Year	Member	Party
1964	T. A. Ngullie	Independent politician
1969	T. A. Ngullie	Nagaland Nationalist Organisation
1974	T. A. Ngullie	Nagaland Nationalist Organisation
1977	T. A. Ngullie	Indian National Congress
1982	T. A. Noullio	Indian National Congress
1987	N. L. Odyuo	Naga National Democratic Party
1989	T. A. Nguillie	Indian National Congress
1993	T. A. Ngullie	Naga People's Front
1998	T. C. K. Lotha	Indian National Congress
2003	Yankithung Yanthan	Indian National Congress
2008	Yanthungo Patton	Bharatiya Janata Party
2013	Yanthungo Patton	Naga People's Front
2018	Yanthungo Patton	Bharatiya Janata Party
2023	Yanthungo Patton	Bharatiya Janata Party

== Election results ==
=== 2023 Assembly election ===
2023 Nagaland Legislative Assembly election: Tyüi
Party	Candidate	Votes	%	±%
BJP	Yanthungo Patton	16,641	67.83	12.41
JD(U)	Senchumo Lotha	7,800	31.79	30.91
RJD	Y. Kikon	41	0.17	
Independent	Hayithung Tungoe Lotha	31	0.13	
NOTA	Nota	21	0.09	
Margin of victory		8,841	36.04	21.40
Turnout		24,534	95.28	2.17
Registered electors		25,750		13.46
BJP hold		Swing	12.41	

=== 2018 Assembly election ===
2018 Nagaland Legislative Assembly election: Tyüi
Party	Candidate	Votes	%	±%
BJP	Yanthungo Patton	11,709	55.41	54.14
NPF	Yankithung Yanthan	8,617	40.78	−16.21
NCP	Dr. R. Thungchamo Ezung	585	2.77	−9.17
JD(U)	Chobhathung Odyuo	187	0.88	
NOTA	None of the Above	32	0.15	
Margin of victory		3,092	14.63	−12.76
Turnout		21,130	93.10	−2.23
Registered electors		22,695		6.99
BJP gain from NPF		Swing	-1.58	

=== 2013 Assembly election ===
2013 Nagaland Legislative Assembly election: Tyüi
Party	Candidate	Votes	%	±%
NPF	Yanthungo Patton	11,525	56.99	51.93
INC	Yankithung Yanthan	5,985	29.60	2.54
NCP	Senchumo	2,414	11.94	1.66
BJP	T. A. Ngullie	258	1.28	−30.03
Margin of victory		5,540	27.40	23.15
Turnout		20,222	95.33	0.55
Registered electors		21,212		1.97
NPF gain from BJP		Swing	25.69	

=== 2008 Assembly election ===
2008 Nagaland Legislative Assembly election: Tyüi
Party	Candidate	Votes	%	±%
BJP	Yanthungo Patton	6,172	31.30	−2.26
INC	Yankithung Yanthan	5,335	27.06	−22.46
United Naga Democratic Party	T. A. Ngullie	2,565	13.01	
NCP	Y. Y. Kikon	2,026	10.27	
Independent	Dr. Phyobemo Ngully	1,800	9.13	
NPF	Pinyimthung Lotha	998	5.06	−11.86
Margin of victory		837	4.24	−11.71
Turnout		19,718	96.57	4.46
Registered electors		20,803		14.59
BJP gain from INC		Swing	-18.21	

=== 2003 Assembly election ===
2003 Nagaland Legislative Assembly election: Tyüi
Party	Candidate	Votes	%	±%
INC	Yankithung Yanthan	8,108	49.51	
BJP	T. A. Ngullie	5,496	33.56	
NPF	Nrio Patton	2,771	16.92	
Margin of victory		2,612	15.95	
Turnout		16,375	90.32	90.32
Registered electors		18,154		14.13
INC hold		Swing	-1.59	

=== 1998 Assembly election ===
1998 Nagaland Legislative Assembly election: Tyüi
Party	Candidate	Votes	%	±%
INC	T. C. K. Lotha	Unopposed		
Registered electors		15,906		26.47
INC gain from NPF		Swing		

=== 1993 Assembly election ===
1993 Nagaland Legislative Assembly election: Tyüi
Party	Candidate	Votes	%	±%
NPF	T. A. Ngullie	5,409	51.11	6.18
Independent	C. Yilumo Kithan	4,523	42.73	
INC	R. L . Kinghen	652	6.16	−48.92
Margin of victory		886	8.37	−1.78
Turnout		10,584	84.64	−4.73
Registered electors		12,577		28.53
NPF gain from INC		Swing	-3.97	

=== 1989 Assembly election ===
1989 Nagaland Legislative Assembly election: Tyüi
Party	Candidate	Votes	%	±%
INC	T. A. Nguillie	4,796	55.08	12.52
NPF	N. L. Odyuo	3,912	44.92	
Margin of victory		884	10.15	2.86
Turnout		8,708	89.37	4.01
Registered electors		9,785		−2.95
INC gain from NND		Swing	5.23	

=== 1987 Assembly election ===
1987 Nagaland Legislative Assembly election: Tyüi
Party	Candidate	Votes	%	±%
NND	N. L. Odyuo	4,254	49.84	11.28
INC	T. A. Ngullie	3,632	42.55	−1.20
Independent	E. Yenchamongullie	649	7.60	
Margin of victory		622	7.29	2.09
Turnout		8,535	85.36	9.38
Registered electors		10,082		−3.10
NND gain from INC		Swing	6.09	

=== 1982 Assembly election ===
1982 Nagaland Legislative Assembly election: Tyüi
Party	Candidate	Votes	%	±%
INC	T. A. Noullio	3,437	43.76	7.65
NND	N. L. Odyuo	3,029	38.56	
Independent	Ntsomo	1,389	17.68	
Margin of victory		408	5.19	3.09
Turnout		7,855	75.98	−9.47
Registered electors		10,405		37.89
INC hold		Swing	7.65	

=== 1977 Assembly election ===
1977 Nagaland Legislative Assembly election: Tyüi
Party	Candidate	Votes	%	±%
INC	T. A. Ngullie	2,304	36.11	
UDA	Nsemo Ovung	2,170	34.01	11.71
NCN	N. L. Odyuo	1,907	29.89	
Margin of victory		134	2.10	−7.23
Turnout		6,381	85.45	−2.94
Registered electors		7,546		29.99
INC gain from NNO		Swing	4.47	

=== 1974 Assembly election ===
1974 Nagaland Legislative Assembly election: Tyüi
Party	Candidate	Votes	%	±%
NNO	T. A. Ngullie	1,603	31.64	−22.11
UDA	Khyomo Lotha	1,130	22.30	
Independent	Wopansao Kikon	794	15.67	
Independent	Tsatemo	615	12.14	
Independent	Nyanbemo	508	10.03	
Independent	Tsatheo	417	8.23	
Margin of victory		473	9.33	1.85
Turnout		5,067	88.39	−7.31
Registered electors		5,805		61.12
NNO hold		Swing	-22.11	

=== 1969 Assembly election ===
1969 Nagaland Legislative Assembly election: Tyüi
Party	Candidate	Votes	%	±%
NNO	T. A. Ngullie	1,853	53.74	
Independent	Santsurhomo Ezung	1,595	46.26	
Margin of victory		258	7.48	2.82
Turnout		3,448	95.70	5.86
Registered electors		3,603		29.79
NNO gain from Independent		Swing	7.80	

=== 1964 Assembly election ===
1964 Nagaland Legislative Assembly election: Tyüi
Party	Candidate	Votes	%	±%
Independent	T. A. Ngullie	1,143	45.94	
Independent	S. Ezung	1,027	41.28	
Independent	Chumdemo Ezung	318	12.78	
Margin of victory		116	4.66	
Turnout		2,488	89.84	
Registered electors		2,776		
Independent win (new seat)				

== See also ==
- List of constituencies of the Nagaland Legislative Assembly
- Wokha district
