= Yanthungo Patton =

Indian politician from Nagaland

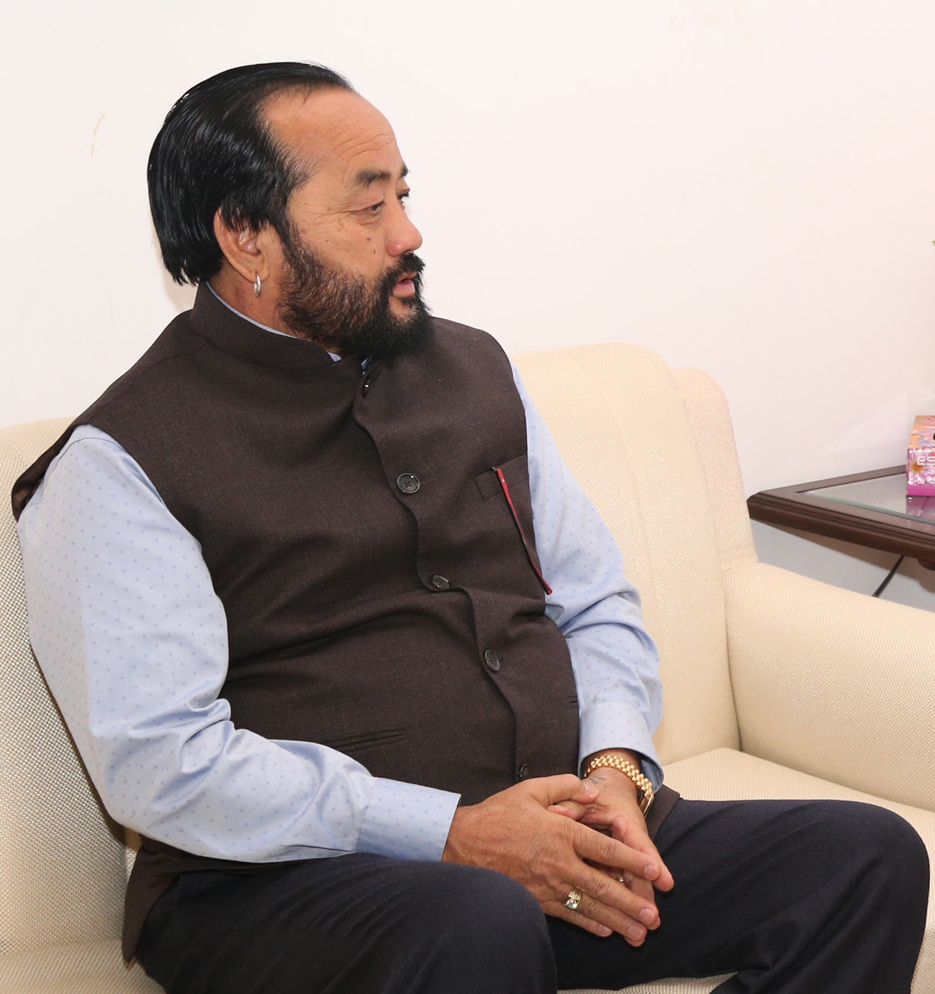

3rd Deputy Chief Minister of Nagaland
- Incumbent
- Assumed office 9 March 2018 serving with T. R. Zeliang since March 2023
- Governor: Padmanabha Acharya; R. N. Ravi; Jagdish Mukhi; La. Ganesan; Ajay Kumar Bhalla
- Chief Minister: Neiphiu Rio
- Department: Home Affairs; Border Affairs
- Preceded by: I. K. Sema (1989)
- Constituency: Tyüi

Member of Nagaland Legislative Assembly
- Incumbent
- Assumed office 3 March 2018
- Chief Minister: Neiphiu Rio
- Constituency: Tyüi

Personal details
- Born: 1 January 1957 (age 69) Riphyim, Naga Hills District (Now in Wokha District, Nagaland, India)
- Party: Bharatiya Janata Party
- Cabinet: Government of Nagaland

Yanthungo Patton (born 1 January 1957), also known as Y. Patton, is an Indian politician from Nagaland who is 3rd Deputy Chief Minister of the Indian state of Nagaland serving in the NDPP-BJP administration under Neiphiu Rio from 2018 along with TR Zeliang since 2023 under Neiphiu Rio in BJP-NPF government. He is the BJP MLA from Tyüi Assembly Constituency and was Home Minister in the NPF-led government. He is also the BJP Legislature Party (BJP) leader in the state assembly.

On the 2021 Nagaland killings, Patton as the deputy CM of Nagaland tweeted,

Oting's (Mon) disturbing and tragic incident in which civilians were killed will be thoroughly investigated and justice will be served. Condolences to the bereaved families and prayers for the speedy recovery of the injured. In the wake of the tragedy, I urge peace from everyone!

On May 17, 2025, he and Harivansh represented India at the Papal inauguration of Pope Leo XIV.
