= S. Toiho Yeptho =

Indian politician (born 1973)

Deputy Speaker of Nagaland Legislative Assembly
- Incumbent
- Assumed office 27 February 2024

Member of Nagaland Legislative Assembly
- Incumbent
- Assumed office 2023
- Chief Minister: Neiphiu Rio
- Speaker: Sharingain Longkumer.
- Preceded by: H. Khehovi
- Constituency: Suruhoto

Personal details
- Born: 1973 (age 52–53)
- Party: Naga People's Front
- Other political affiliations: Nationalist Congress Party 2023- May 31, 2025 Naga People's Front
- Education: Nagaland University (BA, 1997)
- Occupation: Businessman

S. Toiho Yeptho (born 1973) is an Indian politician from Nagaland. He has been the Deputy Speaker of Nagaland Legislative Assembly since February 2024. He was elected to the Nagaland assembly from Suruhoto in the 2023 Nagaland legislative election as a member of the Nationalist Congress Party. On May 31, 2025, he along with 6 other NCP MLAs joined the ruling Nationalist Democratic Progressive Party. Later he joined the Naga People's Front after it merged with the NDPP.

== Personal life ==
Yeptho graduated with a Bachelor of Arts from Nagaland University in 1997.
