= Jwenga Seb =

Indian politician

Jwenga Seb (born 1978) is an Indian politician from Nagaland. He is an MLA from the Tseminyu Assembly constituency, which is reserved for Scheduled Tribe community, in Tseminyu district. He won the 2023 Nagaland Legislative Assembly election, representing the Janata Dal (United).

== Early life and education ==
Seb is from Tseminyu, Nagaland. He is the son of the late Shuni Seb. He completed his bachelor in architecture in 2001 at the College of Engineering, Trivandrum, which is affiliated with the University of Kerala. His wife is in government service.

== Career ==
Seb was elected from the Tseminyu constituency representing the Janata Dal (United) in the 2023 Nagaland Legislative Assembly election. He polled 8,096 votes and defeated his nearest rival, Longuseng Semp of the Republican Party of India (Athawale), by a margin of 2,563 votes. Of the seven Janata Dal (United) candidates who contested the Nagaland Assembly election, he is the lone winner from the party and extended support to the government. Later in March 2023, the central leadership of the party, dissolved the Nagaland state unit, as the Nagaland JD(U) president Senchumo NSN Lotha, had issued a letter of support to the Nagaland chief minister without consulting the central party leaders. However, the party leaders congratulated Seb and thanked the people, and pledged to pursue development work.
