= Sethrongkyu Sangtam =

Indian politician

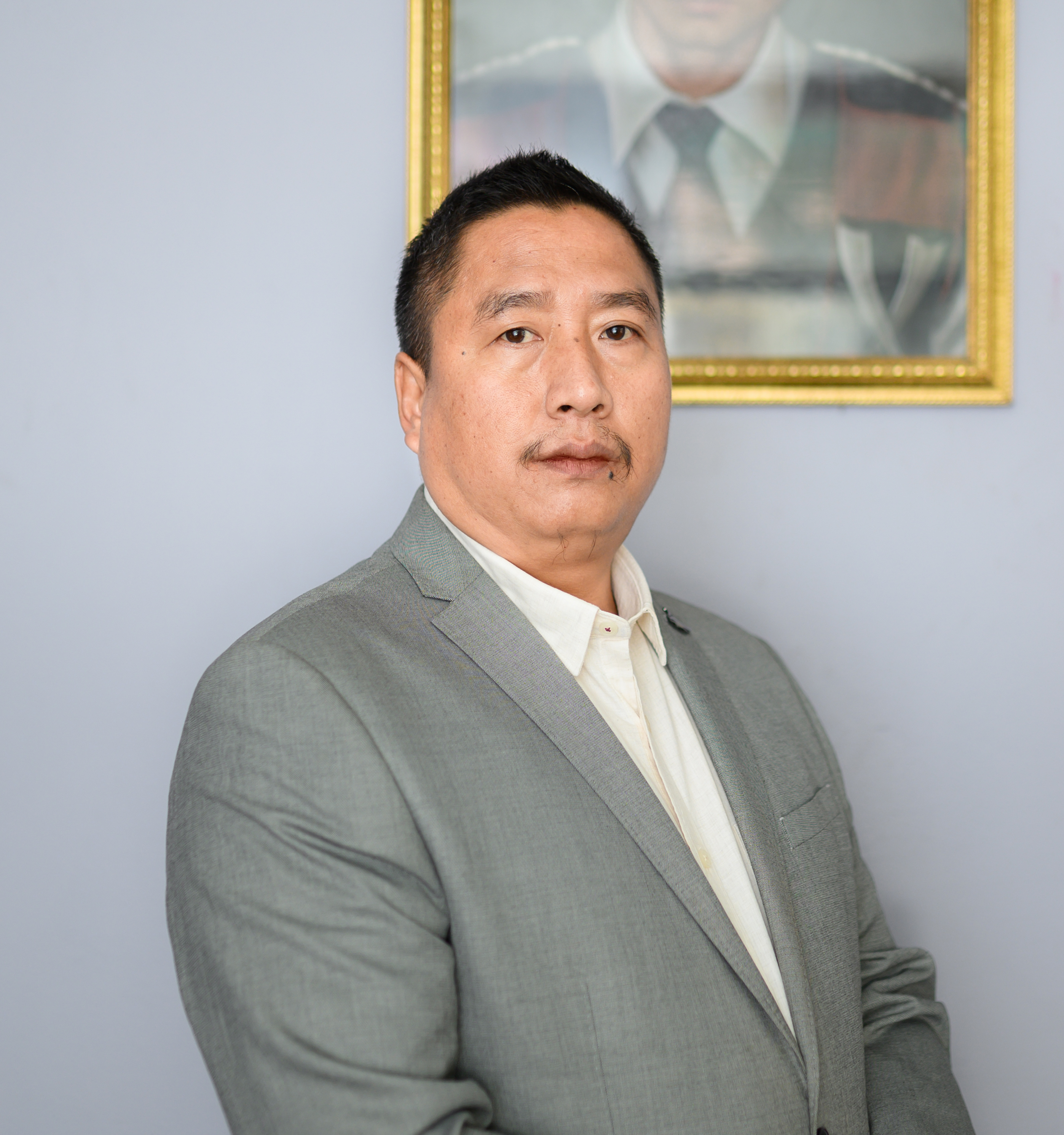
- Sethrongkyu in 2023

Advisor for IT & Communication, Economics & Statistics, Evaluation, Government of Nagaland
- Constituency: 52 A/C Longkhim-Chare

Personal details
- Born: 16 December 1977 (age 48)
- Party: Bharatiya Janata Party
- Spouse: Rijuli
- Website: https://x.com/Sethrongkyu_

Sethrongkyu Sangtam (born 1978) is an Indian politician from Nagaland. He is an MLA from the Longkhim Chare Assembly constituency, which is reserved for Scheduled Tribe community, in Tuensang district. He won the 2023 Nagaland Legislative Assembly election, representing the Bharatiya Janata Party (BJP).

== Early life and education ==
Sangtam is from Longkhim, Tuensang district, Nagaland. He is the son of the late Horangse Sangtam. He completed his B.A. with Honors in history in 2000 at the Hindu College, which is affiliated with the University of Delhi.

== Career ==
Sangtam won the Longkhim-Chare Assembly constituency representing the BJP in the 2023 Nagaland Assembly election. He polled 10,187 votes and defeated his nearest rival, Muthingnyuba Sangtam of the Nationalist Congress Party, by a margin of 1,623 votes.
