= Neiphiu Rio =

9th Chief Minister of Nagaland since 2018

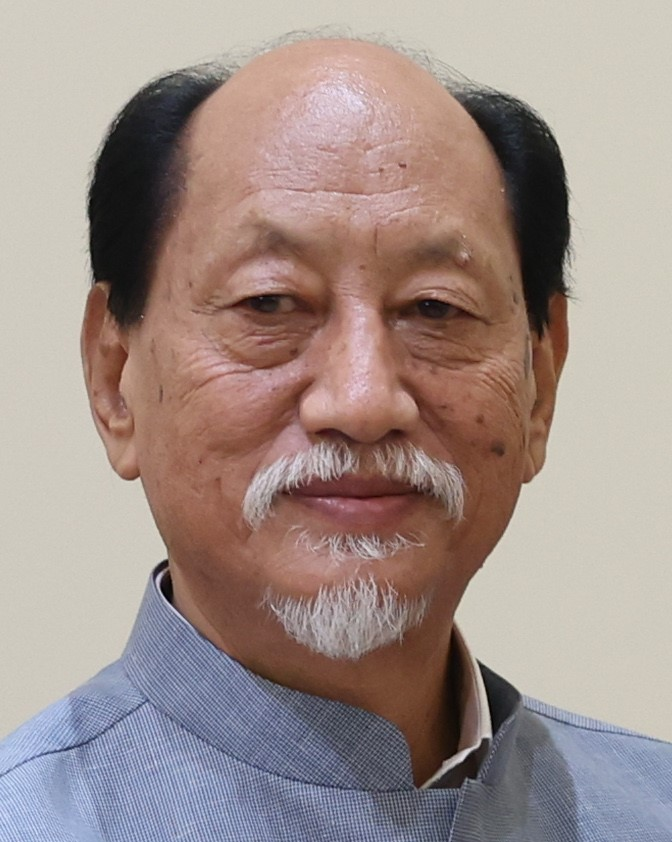
- Rio in 2024

7th Chief Minister of Nagaland
- Incumbent
- Assumed office 8 March 2018
- Governor: Padmanabha Acharya (2018–2019); R. N. Ravi (2019–2021); Jagdish Mukhi (additional charge; 2021-2023); La. Ganesan (2023-2025); Ajay Kumar Bhalla (additional charge; 2025-26); Nand Kishore Yadav (2026-)
- Deputy: T. R. Zeliang (since 2023); Y. Patton (since 2018)
- Cabinet: Rio IV; Rio V
- Preceded by: T. R. Zeliang
- In office 12 March 2008 – 24 May 2014
- Governor: K. Sankaranarayanan (2008); Gurbachan Jagat (2008-2009); Nikhil Kumar (2009-2013); Ashwani Kumar (2013-2014)
- Cabinet: Rio II; Rio III
- Preceded by: President's rule
- Succeeded by: T. R. Zeliang
- In office 6 March 2003 – 3 January 2008
- Governor: Shyamal Datta
- Cabinet: Rio I
- Preceded by: S. C. Jamir
- Succeeded by: President's rule

Member of Parliament, Lok Sabha
- In office 26 May 2014 – 22 February 2018
- Preceded by: C. M. Chang
- Succeeded by: Tokheho Yepthomi
- Constituency: Nagaland

President of Naga People's Front
- Incumbent
- Assumed office 21 October 2025
- Preceded by: Apong Pongener

Personal details
- Born: Neiphiu Guolhoulie Rio; 11 November 1950 (age 76) Tuophema, Assam, India (present-day Kohima district, Nagaland)
- Party: Naga People's Front (2002–2017, 2025–present); Nationalist Democratic Progressive Party (2018–2025); Indian National Congress (1989–2002)
- Other political affiliations: National Democratic Alliance; United Progressive Alliance; North-East Democratic Alliance; People's Democratic Alliance (Nagaland)
- Spouse: Kaisa Rio (m. 1975)
- Children: 6
- Relatives: Theja Rio (nephew); Zhaleo Rio (brother)

Neiphiu Rio (born 11 November 1950) is an Indian politician serving as the chief minister of Nagaland and leader of the house in the Nagaland Legislative Assembly since 2018. Previously serving from 2003 to 2014, he is the longest serving Chief Minister of Nagaland. He was also a Member of Parliament from Nagaland in Lok Sabha from 2014 to 2018. He is also currently serving as the president of the Naga People's Front.

== Early life and education ==
Neiphiu Rio was born on 11 November 1950 to an Angami Naga family from Tuophema. His parents were Guolhoulie and Kevilhouü Rio. He received his early education from Baptist English School, Kohima and Sainik School, Purulia, West Bengal. He attended St Joseph's College, Darjeeling and later graduated from Kohima Arts College.

An active student leader during his school and college days, Rio entered politics at a very young age. He had headed many organisations before becoming the Chief Minister of Nagaland. He served as the President of the youth wing of United Democratic Front (UDF) Youth Wing for Kohima District in 1974. He was also appointed the Chairman of Northern Angami Area Council in 1984. He also had been the honorary Vice-President of Indian Red Cross Society Nagaland branch.

== Political career ==
On entering politics, Rio contested the Nagaland Assembly elections of 1987 unsuccessfully as an independent candidate. Rio was first elected to Nagaland Legislative Assembly as Congress (I) candidate from the Northern Angami-II constituency during the 7th General Elections of 1989. He was appointed the Minister for Sports and School Education and subsequently as Minister for Higher & Technical Education and Art & Culture; also served as Chairman in Nagaland Industrial Development Corporation, Nagaland Khadi & Village Industries Board and Development Authority of Nagaland. Rio was again elected from the same Constituency in 1993 as Congress (I) candidate and appointed Minister for Works & Housing. As a member of the Indian National Congress (INC), Rio was Nagaland's Home Minister as part of the cabinet headed by S. C. Jamir from 1998 till 2002 when he resigned from the ministry accusing Chief Minister S. C. Jamir of blocking a negotiated settlement of the vexed Naga issue.

In the 2013 Nagaland Legislative Assembly election, he was elected from the Northern Angami II constituency on an Naga People's Front (NPF) ticket defeating his INC rival Kevise Sogotsu with an overwhelming margin of 12,671 votes.

== Chief Ministership of Nagaland ==
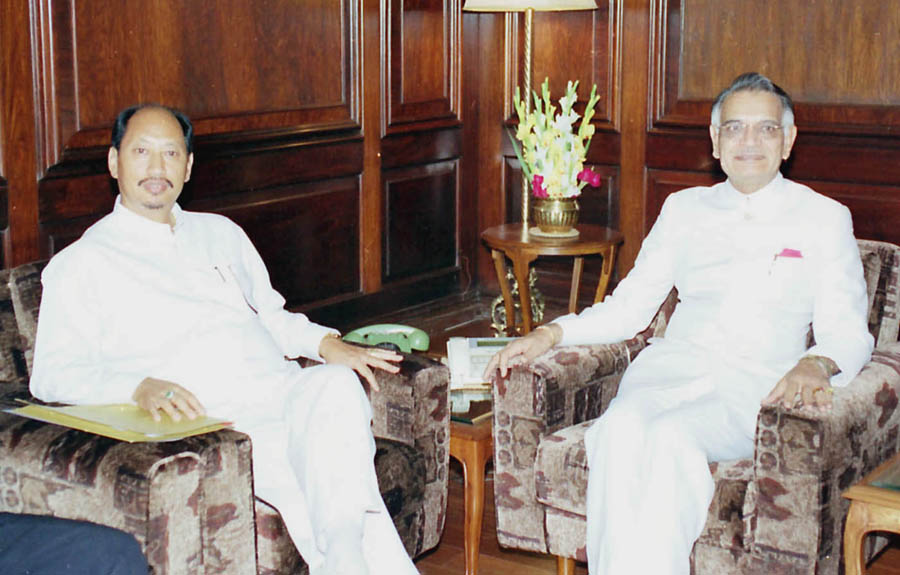
Chief Minister Rio with then Union Home Minister Shivraj Patil in New Delhi on 2 June 2004.

After his resignation, Rio joined Naga People's Front which partnered with other Naga regionalist parties and the state branch of the Bharatiya Janata Party (BJP) under his leadership to form the Democratic Alliance of Nagaland (DAN), a coalition which won the 2003 state elections, bringing the 10-year-long rule of the Indian National Congress in the state to an end. Rio subsequently took office as Chief Minister on 6 March 2003.

Before completing his first term, Rio was dismissed as Chief Minister when President's Rule was imposed in Nagaland on 3 January 2008. However, his party emerged as the single largest party in the ensuing elections and Rio, as the leader of DAN, was invited by the state Governor to form the government on 12 March 2008. During the 2013 Nagaland State elections, NPF won a thumping majority and Rio was re-elected as Chief Minister for a third term.

At a memorial service in Kohima for the victims of 2021 Nagaland killings, Rio said "I am hopeful that the country and the rest of the world will not only understand the Nagas’ story but also the want for lasting peace."

== Achievements ==
Rio has played a key role in setting up the Music Task Force, the first music industry in the country. He was awarded the Mother Teresa Millennium award for his outstanding leadership and contributions to politics in Kolkata in the year 2007.

== Personal life ==
Rio is married to Kaisa Rio. Together they have five daughters and one son. His brother Zhaleo Rio was elected to Nagaland Assembly in 2013, 2018 and 2023 from Ghaspani II Constituency and was the Deputy Speaker of the assembly in 2018. His mother Kevilhouü Rio died on 1 January 2020, at the age of 92. His father had died 30 years before his mother's death.

His nephew, Theja Rio, is a filmmaker whose debut feature film Angh won the Platform Prize at the 2026 Toronto International Film Festival.

== See also ==
- Fourth Rio ministry
- Fifth Rio ministry

Lok Sabha
Preceded by C. M. Chang	Member of Parliament for Nagaland; 2014 – 2018	Succeeded by Tokheho Yepthomi
Political offices
Preceded by S. C. Jamir	Chief Minister of Nagaland; 6 March 2003 – 3 January 2008	Succeeded by President's rule
Preceded by President's rule	Chief Minister of Nagaland; 12 March 2008 – 24 May 2014	Succeeded by T. R. Zeliang
Preceded by T. R. Zeliang	Chief Minister of Nagaland; 8 March 2018 – Present	Incumbent
