= List of Naga politicians =

The following is a list of prominent politicians belonging to the Naga people.

== Naga politicians from Nagaland ==
=== Angami Naga ===
- Kevichüsa Angami (1903–1990), Former Member of Parliament, Lok Sabha from Nagaland (1989–1990)
- John Bosco Jasokie (died 2005), Former Chief Minister of Nagaland (1975; 1980–1982)
- Vizol Koso (1914–2008), First Naga pilot (Royal Indian Air Force during World War II) and Chief Minister of Nagaland (1974–1975; 1977–1980)
- Rokonicha Kuotsü (1946–2019), former Minister and Member of Legislative Assembly of Nagaland from Ghaspani-2 Assembly constituency in 1974, 1977, 1982, 1987, 1998 and 2003
- Salhoutuonuo Kruse (b. 1966), The Second woman to be elected to the Nagaland Legislative Assembly and First Woman Cabinet Minister of Nagaland
- Khriehu Liezietsu (b. 1966), Former Parliamentary Secretary and MLA from Northern Angami-I Assembly constituency
- Shürhozelie Liezietsu (b. 1936), Former Chief Minister of Nagaland (22 February 2017 – 19 July 2017)
- Thepfülo-u Nakhro (1913–1986), Former Chief Minister of Nagaland (1966–1969)
- Zale Neikha (b. 1976), Former Adviser for YR&S member of Nagaland Legislative Assembly from the Southern Angami-II Assembly constituency
- Kiyanilie Peseyie (1941–2017), Former Speaker of Nagaland
- Viswesül Pusa (1954–2017), Former Cabinet Minister and Member of Nagaland Legislative Assembly from 1993 to 2013
- Tseilhoutuo Rhütso (b. 1975), Member of Nagaland Legislative Assembly from Kohima Town Assembly constituency
- Neiphiu Rio (b. 1950), Present and Five-time Chief Minister of Nagaland and former Member of Parliament of the Lok Sabha
- Zhaleo Rio (b. 1953), Adviser for Urban Development & Municipal Affairs and MLA from Ghaspani-2 Assembly constituency
- Vizadel Sakhrie (1943–1995), Former Minister of the Nagaland Legislative Assembly
- Rano M. Shaiza (1928–2015), First women Parliamentarian from Nagaland
- Vikho-o Yhoshü (1952–2019), Former Speaker of the Nagaland Legislative Assembly

=== Ao Naga ===
- P. Shilu Ao (1916–1988), First Chief Minister of the Indian state of Nagaland
- Imkong L Imchen (b. 1950- 2025), former Adviser IPR and Soil and water Conservation and Member of Nagaland Legislative Assembly
- C. Apok Jamir (b. 1961), Former Parliamentary secretary Nagaland and former Member of Parliament, Rajya Sabha
- Metsübo Jamir (b. 1959), Cabinet Minister for Rural Development and SIRD Nagaland from Mokokchung Town Assembly constituency
- Imchalemba (b. 1939), Former Member of Parliament, Lok Sabha
- S. C. Jamir (b. 1931), Former Chief Minister of the Indian state of Nagaland and former Governor of Indian states of Gujarat Goa Maharashtra and Odisha
- S. Supongmeren Jamir (b. 1963), Lok Sabha Member of Parliament from Nagaland
- Imtikümzük Longkümer (1967–2018), Politician from Aonglenden Assembly constituency
- Sharingain Longkümer (b. 1981), Speaker of Nagaland Legislative Assembly
- T. Tali (1943–2020), Member of the Nagaland Legislative Assembly from Tuli Assembly constituency in 1977, 1987, 1993, 1998 and 2003
- Temjen Imna Along Longkümer (b. 1980), Former State President of the Bharatiya Janata Party of Nagaland and Cabinet Minister for Tourism & Higher Education Government of Nagaland
- Tongpang Ozüküm (b. 1981), Adviser for Water Resources and Member of Nagaland Legislative Assembly from Angetyongpang Assembly constituency. Former Cabinet Minister for PWD (Mechanical, Housing, Road & Bridges) (2018-2023) Government of Nagaland

=== Chakhesang Naga ===
- K. G. Kenye (b. 1960), Cabinet Minister for Power in Nagaland and Former Member of Parliament, Rajya Sabha from Nagaland
- Neiba Kronu (b. 1967), Former Cabinet Minister in Nagaland Legislative Assembly
- Küzholüzo Nienü (b. 1966), Member of Nagaland Legislative Assembly
- Vamüzo Phesao (1938–2000), Chief Minister of Nagaland (1990–1992)
- Chotisüh Sazo (b. 1962), Former Speaker of Nagaland Legislative Assembly and Former Cabinet Minister.
- Thenucho Tünyi (b. 1952), Former Speaker of Nagaland Legislative Assembly
- Lhüthiprü Vasa (d. 1993), Former Minister of the Nagaland Legislative Assembly
- Mülhüpra Vero (1934–2020), First Naga member of parliament

=== Chang Naga ===
- C. M. Chang (1942–2020), Former Cabinet Minister of Nagaland and Former Member of Parliament, Lok Sabha
- H. Chuba Chang (b. 1951), Former Member of Nagaland Legislative Assembly
- Kejong Chang (b. 1934), Oldest Member of State Legislative Assembly in India.
- P. Bashangmongba Chang (b. 1979), Cabinet Minister for PWD department of Housing & Mechanical Government of Nagaland
- P. Chuba Chang (1965–2013), Member of State Legislative Assembly of Nagaland from 1998 to 2003

=== Konyak Naga ===
- C. L. John (b. 1966), Cabinet Minister for Environment, Forests and Climate change
- Chingwang Konyak (b. 1943), Member of Parliament, Lok Sabha (1980–1984)
- N. Bongkhao Konyak (b. 1977), Politician from Tobu constituency
- Phangnon Konyak (b. 1978), First Women from Nagaland to be elected as Member of Parliament, Rajya Sabha (2022–present)
- P. Paiwang Konyak (b. 1977), Cabinet Minister for Health and Family Welfare Government of Nagaland.
- Noke Wangnao (b. 1948), Former Adviser & Member of Nagaland Legislative Assembly
- W. Wangyuh (b. 1963), Former Member of Parliament, Lok Sabha

=== Lotha Naga ===
- T. kikon (Tsenlamo Kikon of Yimpang, born 1933) from 40 Bhandari Assembly Constituency was one of the founding fathers of Nagaland statehood. He was catapulted into politics when he was selected as one of first Interim Body Members (defacto Legislative Assembly) prior to Nagaland statehood. From 1963 onwards, he was elected five times in the general elections to the Nagaland legislative assembly and served as cabinet minister twice. He was a staunch regionalist in his political approach and worked consistently for the welfare of the people, particularly for the Lotha community. He was instrumental in fighting for a district for the Lotha tribe in 1973.
- Achumbemo Kikon (b. 1976), Politician from Bhandari Assembly constituency. Present Secretary General of Naga People's Front .
- Mmhonlümo Kikon (b. 1978), Former Minister in Government of Nagaland.
- Khyomo Lotha (b. 1940), Former Member of Parliament, Rajya Sabha.
- T. M. Lotha (1951/1952–2020), Former Minister in Government of Nagaland .
- Yanthungo Patton (b. 1957), Present Deputy Chief Minister for Home & Border Affairs Government of Nagaland.

=== Phom Naga ===
- S. Pangnyu Phom (b. 1964), Former Cabinet Minister for Health & Family Welfare Government of Nagaland.

=== Pochury Naga ===
- Yitachu (b. 1967), Former Cabinet Minister of Nagaland Legislative Assembly

=== Sangtam Naga ===
- K. Asungba Sangtam, (b. 1945), Former Member of Parliament, Lok Sabha
- Kashiho Sangtam (b. 1961), Former Cabinet Minister for Soil & water Conservation and Geology & Mining Government of Nagaland

=== Sümi Naga ===
- Y. Hewoto Awomi (b. 1953), Former politician from Dimapur-II Assembly constituency
- G. Kaito Aye (b. 1953), Present Cabinet Minister for Road & Bridges in Nagaland Legislative Assembly
- K. L. Chishi (b. 1944), Former Chief Minister of Nagaland
- Hokishe Sema (1931–2007), Former Chief Minister of Indian state of Nagaland and former Governor of Indian state of Himachal Pradesh
- Shikiho Sema (b. 1946), Former Member of Parliament, Lok Sabha
- Kihoto Hollohon (1932–2021), Politician from Ghaspani-2 Assembly constituency
- Scato Swu (1924–2014), Former Rajya Sabha Member of Parliament from Nagaland.
- Tokheho Yepthomi (b. 1956), Former Member of Parliament, Lok Sabha, Former Minister, Former Leader of Opposition in Nagaland Legislative Assembly
- H. Khekiho Zhimomi (1946–2015), Former Member of Parliament, Rajya Sabha
- Jacob Zhimomi (b. 1980), Present Cabinet Minister For PHE & Cooperation in Nagaland Legislative Assembly
- Hekani Jakhalu Kense, The first woman to be elected to Nagaland Legislative Assembly. Currently serving as Adviser For Industries & Commerce Government of Nagaland

=== Zeliangrong Naga ===
- T. R. Zeliang (b. 1952), Former Chief Minister of Nagaland and Present Deputy chief minister of Nagaland and Former Member of Parliament, Rajya Sabha.
- Neiba Ndang (b. 1954), Former Speaker of Nagaland Legislative Assembly
- Vatsu Meru, Member of Nagaland Legislative Assembly from 2003–2008

== Naga politicians from Manipur ==
=== Anāl Naga ===
- B.D. Behring (b. 1946), Former Member of Parliament, Rajya Sabha

=== Lamkang Naga ===
- Olish Shilshi (b. 1977), Member of Manipur Legislative Assembly

=== Mao Naga ===
- Losii Dikho (born 1966) is currently serving as Deputy Chief Minister of Manipur. Losii Dikho had earlier served as Cabinet Minister for PHED and Printing & Stationary Government of Manipur from 2017–2022.
- Lorho S. Pfoze (b. 1960), Former Member of Parliament, Lok Sabha representing Outer Manipur Lok Sabha constituency. Lorho S. Pfoze is currently the President of National People's Party (India) Manipur unit.
- N. Kayisii (1966–2025), was President of National People's Party Manipur unit and legislative leader in Manipur Assembly. N. Kayisii served as Minister of Tribal Affairs and Fisheries in Government of Manipur from 2017-2020.

=== Maram Naga ===
- Francis Ngajokpa, (b. 1964), Former Minister in Manipur Legislative Assembly.

=== Maring Naga ===
- W Morung Makunga (b. 1955), former Minister in Manipur Legislative Assembly
- D Korungthang (b. 1961), former Minister in Manipur Legislative Assembly

=== Poumai Naga ===
- Soso Lorho (1939–2018), Former Minister in Manipur Legislative Assembly
- D D Thaisii (b. 1962), Former Minister in Manipur Legislative Assembly.
- J Kumo Sha (b. 1982), Member of Manipur Legislative Assembly representing Karong Constituency.

=== Tangkhul Naga ===
- Alfred Kan-Ngam Arthur (b. 1976), Present Member of Parliament, Lok Sabha representing Outer Manipur Constituency.
- Rishang Keishing (1920–2017), Served as Chief Minister of Manipur from 1980 to 1988 and from 1994 to 1997
- Leishiyo Keishing (b. 1974), Member of Manipur Legislative Assembly from Phungyar Assembly constituency
- Ram Muivah (b. 1960) Rtd IAS Member of Manipur Legislative Assembly representing Ukhrul Assembly constituency
- Yaronsho Ngalung (b.1978), Caretaker Chairman of Autonomous District Council of Ukhrul
- Hangmila Shaiza (1920–1997), First Naga woman legislator
- Yangmaso Shaiza (1923–1984), Served as the fourth Chief Minister of Manipur and the first from the hill regions to hold the post
- MK Preshow Shimray (b. 1966), former deputy speaker of Manipur Legislative Assembly
- Khashim Vashum (b. 1964), Served as Cabinet Minister for Transport & Veterinary Welfare Government of Manipur

=== Zeliangrong Naga ===
- Mani Charenamei (b. 1959), Former Member of Parliament, Lok Sabha
- Dinganglung Gangmei (b. 1979) Rtd IAS, Chairman of Hill Area Committee in Manipur Legislative Assembly
- Gaikhangam Gangmei (b. 1950), Congress Working Committee member and former Deputy Chief Minister of Manipur (2012-2017).
- Gangmumei Kamei (1939–2017), Founder of Federal Party of Manipur
- Samuel Jendai Kamei (b. 1959), politician who represented Tamenglong Assembly constituency from 1995–2002 and 2017–2020.
- Meijinlung Kamson (b. 1939), Former Union Minister of State for Home Affairs
- Awangbow Newmai (born 1968), served as Cabinet Minister for Water Resources & Disaster Management Government of Manipur.
- Kikhonbou Newmai, Former Member of Manipur Legislative Assembly
- Janghemlung Panmei (b. 1977), Member of Manipur Legislative Assembly representing Tamenglong Assembly constituency

== Naga politicians from Arunachal Pradesh ==
=== Nocte Naga ===
- Wangki Lowang (b. 1962), Cabinet Minister in Arunachal Pradesh Legislative Assembly
- Wangcha Rajkumar (1965–2007), Former Member of parliament from Arunachal Pradesh
- James Lowangcha Wanglat (b. 1950), Former Cabinet Minister in Arunachal Pradesh Legislative Assembly
- Wanglin Lowangdong (b. 1956), Member of Arunachal Pradesh Legislative Assembly
- Wanglam Sawin (b. 1969), Member of Arunachal Pradesh Legislative Assembly
- Tirong Aboh (1978–2019), Member of Arunachal Pradesh Legislative Assembly from 2014–19
- Chakat Aboh (b. 1974), Member of Arunachal Pradesh Legislative Assembly
- T. L. Rajkumar, Former Member of Arunachal Pradesh Legislative Assembly

=== Tangsa Naga ===
- Kamlung Mossang (b. 1962), Cabinet Minister in Arunachal Pradesh Legislative Assembly
- Setong Sena (1964–2015), Former Speaker of Arunachal Pradesh Legislative Assembly
- Laisam Simai (b. 1975), Member of Arunachal Pradesh Legislative Assembly
- Phosum Khimhun (b. 1960), Member of Arunachal Pradesh Legislative Assembly

=== Tutsa Naga ===
- Tesam Pongte (b.1976), Member of Arunachal Pradesh Legislative Assembly
- Wangnia Pongte (1953–2013), Former Minister of Arunachal Pradesh Legislative Assembly

=== Wancho Naga ===
- Noksong Boham (1948–2019), Former Minister in Arunachal Pradesh Legislative Assembly
- Newlai Tingkhatra (1953–2014), Former Cabinet Minister in Arunachal Pradesh Legislative Assembly
- Honchun Ngandam (b. 1966), Cabinet Minister in Arunachal Pradesh Legislative Assembly
- Tanpho Wangnaw (b. 1966), Member of Arunachal Pradesh Legislative Assembly
- Gabriel Denwang Wangsu (b. 1962), Member of Arunachal Pradesh Legislative Assembly. Present Cabinet Minister for Agriculture, Horticulture, Animal Husbandry & Veterinary Dairy Development, Fisheries, Food & Civil Supplies, Legal Metrology, Consumer Affairs Government of Arunachal Pradesh.

== Naga politicians from Myanmar (Burma) ==
- Thet Naung (b. 1984), Parliamentarian representing Lahe Township in Pyithu Hluttaw (House of Representatives)
- Kyaw Htay (b. 1977), Parliamentarian representing Leshi Township in Pyithu Hluttaw (House of Representatives)
- Min Naing (b. 1963), Parliamentarian representing Sagaing Region 12 in Amyotha Hluttaw (House of Nationalities)
- Won Hla (b. 1978), Parliamentarian representing Nanyun Township in Pyithu Hluttaw (House of Representatives)

== See also ==
- List of Naga people
