= Elections in Nagaland =

Indian state elections

Elections in Nagaland are conducted to elect members of the Lok Sabha and members of the Nagaland Legislative Assembly.

== Legislative assembly elections ==
- 1964 Nagaland Legislative Assembly election
- 1969 Nagaland Legislative Assembly election
- 1974 Nagaland Legislative Assembly election
- 1977 Nagaland Legislative Assembly election
- 1982 Nagaland Legislative Assembly election
- 1987 Nagaland Legislative Assembly election
- 1989 Nagaland Legislative Assembly election
- 1993 Nagaland Legislative Assembly election
- 1998 Nagaland Legislative Assembly election
- 2003 Nagaland Legislative Assembly election
- 2008 Nagaland Legislative Assembly election
- 2013 Nagaland Legislative Assembly election
- 2018 Nagaland Legislative Assembly election
- 2023 Nagaland Legislative Assembly election

== Lok Sabha elections ==
Election	Member	Party
1967	S. C. Jamir	Nagaland Nationalist Organisation
1971	A. Kevichüsa	United Front of Nagaland
1977	Rano M. Shaiza	United Democratic Front
1980	Chingwang Konyak	Independent
1984	Chingwang Konyak	Indian National Congress
1989	Shikiho Sema	
1991	Imchalemba	Nagaland People's Council
1996	Imchalemba	Indian National Congress
1998	K. Asungba Sangtam	Indian National Congress
1999	K. Asungba Sangtam	Indian National Congress
2004	W. Wangyuh Konyak	Nagaland People's Front
2009	C. M. Chang	Nagaland People's Front
2014	Neiphiu Rio	Nagaland People's Front
2018 (Note: By-election)	Tokheho Yepthomi	Nationalist Democratic Progressive Party
2019	Tokheho Yepthomi	Nationalist Democratic Progressive Party
2024	S. Supongmeren Jamir	Indian National Congress
