= Outline of Nagaland =

Overview of and topical guide to Nagaland

Location of Nagaland

The following outline is provided as an overview of and topical guide to Nagaland:

Nagaland – state in Northeast India. It borders the state of Assam to the west, the state of Arunachal Pradesh and part of Assam to the north, Burma (now Myanmar) to the east and Manipur to the south. The state capital is Kohima, and the largest city is Dimapur. It has an area of 16,579 square kilometres (6,401 sq mi) with a population of 1,980,602 on the basis of 2011 Census of India, making it one of the smallest states of India.

== General reference ==
=== Names ===
- Common English name: Nagaland
  - Pronunciation: /ˈnɑːɡəlænd/
- Official English name(s): Nagaland
- Nickname(s):
- Adjectival(s):
  - Naga
- Demonym(s): Nagas

=== Rankings (amongst India's states) ===
- by population: 25th
- by area (2011 census): 26th
- by crime rate (2015): 29th
- by gross domestic product (GDP) (2014): 25th
- by Human Development Index (HDI):
- by life expectancy at birth:
- by literacy rate:

== Geography of Nagaland ==
Geography of Nagaland

- Nagaland is: an Indian state, and one of the Seven Sister States
- Population of Nagaland: 1,980,602 (2011)
- Area of Nagaland: 16,579 km^{2} (6,401 sq mi)
- Atlas of Nagaland

=== Location of Nagaland ===
- Nagaland is situated within the following regions:
  - Northern Hemisphere
  - Eastern Hemisphere
    - Eurasia
      - Asia
        - South Asia
          - India
            - Northeastern India
              - Seven Sister States
- Time zone: Indian Standard Time (UTC+05:30)

=== Environment of Nagaland ===
==== Natural geographic features of Nagaland ====
- Highest point: Mount Saramati

=== Regions of Nagaland ===
==== Administrative divisions of Nagaland ====
===== Districts of Nagaland =====
Districts of Nagaland

- Chümoukedima District
- Dimapur District
- Kiphire District
- Kohima District
- Longleng District
- Mokokchung District
- Mon District
- Niuland District
- Noklak District
- Peren District
- Phek District
- Shamator District
- Tseminyü District
- Tuensang District
- Wokha District
- Zünheboto District

===== Municipalities of Nagaland =====
- Cities of Nagaland
  - Capital of Nagaland: Kohima
  - Chümoukedima
  - Dimapur

=== Demography of Nagaland ===
Demographics of Nagaland

== Government and politics of Nagaland ==
Politics of Nagaland

- Form of government: Indian state government (parliamentary system of representative democracy)
- Capital of Nagaland: Kohima
- Elections in Nagaland

=== Union government in Nagaland ===
- Rajya Sabha members from Nagaland
- Nagaland Pradesh Congress Committee
- Indian general election, 2009 (Nagaland)
- Indian general election, 2014 (Nagaland)

=== Branches of the government of Nagaland ===
Government of Nagaland

Local government in Nagaland

==== Executive branch of the government of Nagaland ====
- Head of state: Governor of Nagaland,
  - Raj Bhavan – official residence of the Governor
- Head of government: Chief Minister of Nagaland,

==== Legislative branch of the government of Nagaland ====
Nagaland Legislative Assembly

==== Judicial branch of the government of Nagaland ====
- Gauhati High Court

=== Law and order in Nagaland ===
- Law enforcement in Nagaland
  - Nagaland Police

== History of Nagaland ==
History of Nagaland

== Culture of Nagaland ==
Culture of Nagaland

- Architecture of Nagaland
- Cuisine of Nagaland
- Monuments in Nagaland
  - Monuments of National Importance in Nagaland
  - State Protected Monuments in Nagaland
- World Heritage Sites in Nagaland

=== Art in Nagaland ===
- Music of Nagaland

=== People of Nagaland ===
- Naga people
- People from Nagaland

=== Religion in Nagaland ===
Religion in Nagaland

- Christianity in Nagaland

=== Sports in Nagaland ===
Sports in Nagaland

- Cricket in Nagaland
  - Nagaland Cricket Association
- Football in Nagaland
  - Nagaland football team
- Wrestling in Nagaland
  - Naga Wrestling Championship

=== Symbols of Nagaland ===
Symbols of Nagaland

- State animal: Mithun
- State bird: Blyth's tragopan
- State flower: Rhododendron
- State seal: Seal of Nagaland
- State tree: Alder

== Economy and infrastructure of Nagaland ==
- Tourism in Nagaland

== Education in Nagaland ==
Education in Nagaland

- Institutions of higher education in Nagaland

== Health in Nagaland ==
- Health in Nagaland
- List of hospitals in Nagaland

== See also ==
- Outline of India
