= 2024 Indian general election in Nagaland =

Election to constitute the 18th Lok Sabha in 2024

- 19 April 2024

1 Nagaland seat in the Lok Sabha
- Opinion polls
- Turnout: 57.72% (▼25.28%)
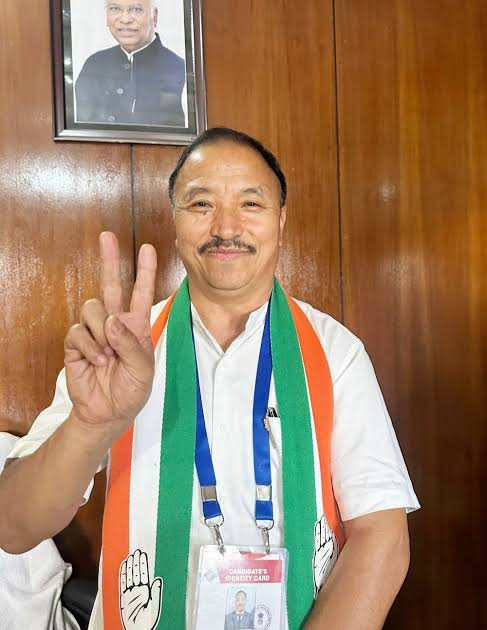

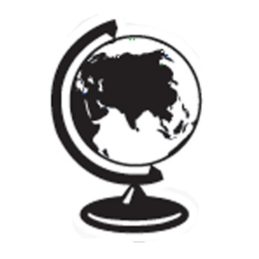
	First party	Second party
Leader	S. Supongmeren Jamir	Chumben Murry
Party	INC	NDPP
Alliance	INDIA	NDA
Leader since	2019	2019
Leader's seat	Nagaland	Nagaland
Last election	48.11%, 0 seat	49.73%, 1 seat
Seats won	1	0
Seat change	▲1	▼1
Percentage	52.83%	46.13%
Swing	▲4.72pp	▼3.60pp
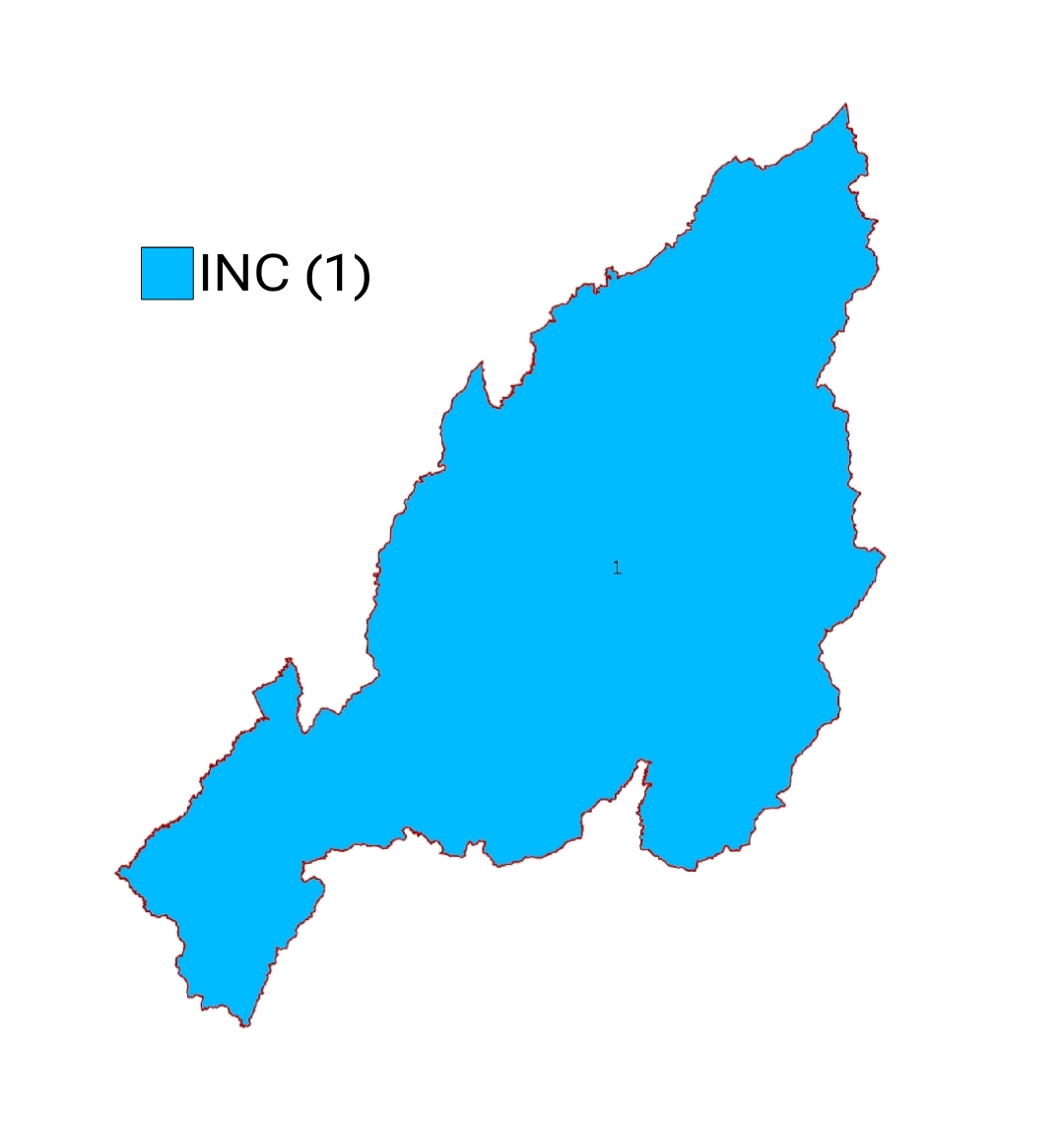
- Nagaland Lok Sabha constituency
Prime Minister before election
Narendra Modi
BJP
Prime Minister after election
Narendra Modi
BJP

The 2024 Indian general election was held in Nagaland on 19 April 2024 to elect 1 member of the 18th Lok Sabha.

== Election schedule ==
Poll event	Phase
Poll event	I
Notification date	20 March 2024
Last date for filing nomination	27 March 2024
Scrutiny of nomination	28 March 2024
Last Date for withdrawal of nomination	30 March 2024
Date of poll	19 April 2024
Date of counting of votes/Result	4 June 2024
No. of constituencies	1

== Parties and alliances ==
=== National Democratic Alliance ===
National Democratic Alliance

Party	Flag	Symbol	Leader	Seats contested
Nationalist Democratic Progressive Party			Chumben Murry	1

=== Indian National Developmental Inclusive Alliance ===
Indian National Developmental Inclusive Alliance

Party	Flag	Symbol	Leader	Seats contested
Indian National Congress			S. Supongmeren Jamir	1

== Candidates ==
Constituency					
Constituency		NDA		INDIA	
1	Nagaland	NDPP	Chumben Murry	INC	S. Supongmeren Jamir

== Surveys and polls ==
=== Opinion polls ===
Polling agency	Date published	Margin of error				Lead
Polling agency	Date published	Margin of error	NDA	INDIA	Others	Lead
ABP News-CVoter	March 2024	±5%	1	0	0	NDA
Times Now-ETG	December 2023	±3%	1	0	0	NDA
India TV-CNX	October 2023	±3%	1	0	0	NDA
Times Now-ETG	September 2023	±3%	1	0	0	NDA
Times Now-ETG	August 2023	±3%	1	0	0	NDA

=== Exit polls ===
Polling agency				Lead
Polling agency	NDA	INDIA	Others	Lead
Actual results	0	1	0	INDIA

== Results ==
=== Results by alliance or party ===
Alliance/ Party		Popular vote			Seats		
Alliance/ Party		Votes	%	±pp	Contested	Won	+/−
INDIA	INC	401,951	52.83	▲4.72	1	1	▲1
NDA	NDPP	350,967	46.13	▼3.60	1	0	▼1
IND		6,232	0.82	▲0.32	1	0	Steady
NOTA		1,646	0.22	▲0.01			
Total		760,796	100	-	3	1	-

=== Results by constituency ===
Constituency		Turnout	Winner					Runner-up					Margin	
Constituency		Turnout	Party	Alliance	Candidate	Votes	%	Party	Alliance	Candidate	Votes	%	Votes	%
1	Nagaland	57.72%▼	INC	INDIA	S. Supongmeren Jamir	4,01,951	52.83%	NDPP	NDA	Chumben Murry	3,50,967	46.13%	50,984	6.70%

== Assembly segments wise lead of Parties ==
2024 Nagaland Lok Sabha Elections Assembly Wise Leads Map

Party	Assembly segments	Position in the Assembly (as of 2023 election)
INC	27	0
BJP	Did not contest	12
NDPP	13	25
NPF	Did not contest	2
NCP	Did not Contest	7
NPP	Did not contest	5
Others	0	9
No Vote Cast	20	-
Total	60	

== See also ==
- 2024 Indian general election in Telangana
- 2024 Indian general election in Puducherry
- 2024 Indian general election in Punjab
