= Imkongmar =

Indian politician (born 1976)

Imkongmar (born 1976) is an Indian politician from Nagaland. He is an MLA from the Mongoya Assembly constituency, which is reserved for Scheduled Tribe community, in Mokokchung district. He won the 2023 Nagaland Legislative Assembly election, representing the Naga People's Front.

== Early life and education ==
Imkongmar is from Mongoya, Mokokchung District, Nagaland. He is the son of late Alemjongshi. He completed his B.A. in 1998 at Baptist High College, Kohima. His wife is a government employee.

== Career ==
Imkongmar won the Mongoya Assembly constituency representing the Nationalist Democratic Progressive Party in the 2023 Nagaland Assembly election. He polled 6,818 votes and defeated his nearest rival, S. Supongmeren Jamir of the Indian National Congress, by a margin of 1,042 votes. Jamir, the state Congress president, emerged as the last hope for Congress as former chief minister K. L. Chishi, opted out of the 2023 election after losing the 2018 election that saw Congress failing to win any seats.
