= Peren Assembly constituency =

Legislative Assembly constituency in Nagaland State, India

Coordinates: 25.51°N 93.74°E

Peren
- Constituency No. 7 for the Nagaland Legislative Assembly

Constituency details
- Country: India
- Region: Northeast India
- State: Nagaland
- District: Peren
- Lok Sabha constituency: Nagaland
- Established: 1964
- Total electors: 32,266
- Reservation: ST

Member of Legislative Assembly
- 14th Nagaland Legislative Assembly
- Incumbent T.R. Zeliang
- Party: NPF
- Alliance: NDA
- Elected year: 2023

Peren Legislative Assembly constituency is one of the 60 Legislative Assembly constituencies of Nagaland state in India. It is part of Peren district and is reserved for candidates belonging to the Scheduled Tribes.

== Members of the Legislative Assembly ==
Year	Member	Party
1964	Longbe	Independent politician
1969	T. Haralu	United Front of Nagaland
1974	Kielu	United Democratic Alliance
1977	L. Lungalang	United Democratic Alliance
1982	L. Lungalang	Naga National Democratic Party
1987	Bangdi Lheilung	Naga National Democratic Party
1989	Bangdi Lheilung	Naga People's Front
1993	Neiba Ndang	Indian National Congress
1998	Neiba Ndang	Indian National Congress
2003	Vatsu Meru	Naga People's Front
2008	T. R. Zeliang	Naga People's Front
2013	T. R. Zeliang	Naga People's Front
2018	T. R. Zeliang	Naga People's Front
2023	T. R. Zeliang	Nationalist Democratic Progressive Party

== Election results ==
Vote share of winning candidates
2023	67.36%
2018	61.66%
2013	54.00%
2008	57.85%
2003	42.11%
1993	42.12%
1989	48.15%
1987	27.53%
1982	52.33%
1977	47.85%
1974	38.49%
1969	36.25%
1964	74.46%

=== Assembly Election 2023 ===
2023 Nagaland Legislative Assembly election: Peren
Party	Candidate	Votes	%	±%
NDPP	T. R. Zeliang	16,800	67.36%	29.51%
NPF	Kingudi Joseph	6,885	27.61%	−34.05%
Independent	K. Kengim Kulimbe	1,116	4.47%	
NOTA	Nota	140	0.56%	
Margin of victory		9,915	39.75%	15.94%
Turnout		24,941	77.30%	−0.90%
Registered electors		32,266		10.62%
NDPP gain from NPF		Swing	5.70%	

=== Assembly Election 2018 ===
2018 Nagaland Legislative Assembly election: Peren
Party	Candidate	Votes	%	±%
NPF	T. R. Zeliang	14,064	61.66%	7.66%
NDPP	Iherie Ndang	8,632	37.84%	
NOTA	None of the Above	113	0.50%	
Margin of victory		5,432	23.82%	13.37%
Turnout		22,809	78.20%	−11.63%
Registered electors		29,168		3.83%
NPF hold		Swing	7.66%	

=== Assembly Election 2013 ===
2013 Nagaland Legislative Assembly election: Peren
Party	Candidate	Votes	%	±%
NPF	T. R. Zeliang	13,627	54.00%	−3.84%
INC	Iherie Ndang	10,991	43.56%	0.71%
Margin of victory		2,636	10.45%	−4.55%
Turnout		25,233	89.83%	2.98%
Registered electors		28,091		−5.66%
NPF hold		Swing	-3.84%	

=== Assembly Election 2008 ===
2008 Nagaland Legislative Assembly election: Peren
Party	Candidate	Votes	%	±%
NPF	T. R. Zeliang	14,959	57.85%	15.74%
INC	Vatsu Meru	11,080	42.85%	7.22%
Margin of victory		3,879	15.00%	8.52%
Turnout		25,859	87.45%	−3.49%
Registered electors		29,777		43.92%
NPF hold		Swing	15.74%	

=== Assembly Election 2003 ===
2003 Nagaland Legislative Assembly election: Peren
Party	Candidate	Votes	%	±%
NPF	Vatsu Meru	7,869	42.11%	
INC	Neiba Ndang	6,658	35.63%	
NCP	Kevipiele	3,003	16.07%	
NDM	Idailung Thou	1,158	6.20%	
Margin of victory		1,211	6.48%	
Turnout		18,688	90.33%	4.39%
Registered electors		20,690		8.19%
NPF gain from INC		Swing	-0.01%	

=== Assembly Election 1998 ===
1998 Nagaland Legislative Assembly election: Peren
Party	Candidate	Votes	%	±%
INC	Neiba Ndang	Unopposed		
Registered electors		19,123		20.59%
INC hold		Swing		

=== Assembly Election 1993 ===
1993 Nagaland Legislative Assembly election: Peren
Party	Candidate	Votes	%	±%
INC	Neiba Ndang	5,686	42.12%	2.74%
NPF	Bangdi Lheilung	4,277	31.68%	−16.47%
Independent	Iswang Chuilo	3,538	26.21%	
Margin of victory		1,409	10.44%	1.66%
Turnout		13,501	85.94%	−3.81%
Registered electors		15,858		53.05%
INC gain from NPF		Swing	-6.03%	

=== Assembly Election 1989 ===
1989 Nagaland Legislative Assembly election: Peren
Party	Candidate	Votes	%	±%
NPF	Bangdi Lheilung	4,429	48.15%	
INC	Ata	3,622	39.37%	19.24%
NPP	G. Patrick Rongma	1,148	12.48%	0.64%
Margin of victory		807	8.77%	1.37%
Turnout		9,199	89.75%	−0.57%
Registered electors		10,361		0.06%
NPF gain from NND		Swing	20.61%	

=== Assembly Election 1987 ===
1987 Nagaland Legislative Assembly election: Peren
Party	Candidate	Votes	%	±%
NND	Bangdi Lheilung	2,548	27.53%	−24.80%
INC	N. C. Zeliang	1,863	20.13%	−12.53%
Independent	Neiba	1,246	13.46%	
NPP	G. Patrick Rongmei	1,096	11.84%	
Independent	Arang	772	8.34%	
Independent	Sibeule	729	7.88%	
Independent	Kuyiding	588	6.35%	
Independent	Ekwerangbe	412	4.45%	
Margin of victory		685	7.40%	−12.26%
Turnout		9,254	90.32%	15.85%
Registered electors		10,355		0.69%
NND hold		Swing	-24.80%	

=== Assembly Election 1982 ===
1982 Nagaland Legislative Assembly election: Peren
Party	Candidate	Votes	%	±%
NND	L. Lungalang	3,954	52.33%	
INC	Longbe Neru	2,468	32.66%	
Independent	Kielu	1,134	15.01%	
Margin of victory		1,486	19.67%	−0.97%
Turnout		7,556	74.47%	−4.11%
Registered electors		10,284		7.33%
NND gain from UDA		Swing	4.47%	

=== Assembly Election 1977 ===
1977 Nagaland Legislative Assembly election: Peren
Party	Candidate	Votes	%	±%
UDA	L. Lungalang	3,524	47.85%	9.37%
Independent	Imriet Dieing	2,004	27.21%	
Independent	Kielu	1,836	24.93%	
Margin of victory		1,520	20.64%	14.89%
Turnout		7,364	78.58%	5.21%
Registered electors		9,582		53.58%
UDA hold		Swing	9.37%	

=== Assembly Election 1974 ===
1974 Nagaland Legislative Assembly election: Peren
Party	Candidate	Votes	%	±%
UDA	Kielu	1,712	38.49%	
Independent	Longbe	1,456	32.73%	
Independent	Vilavor	759	17.06%	
Independent	Kedipeung	521	11.71%	
Margin of victory		256	5.76%	−3.87%
Turnout		4,448	73.38%	−5.66%
Registered electors		6,239		62.05%
UDA gain from UDF		Swing	2.24%	

=== Assembly Election 1969 ===
1969 Nagaland Legislative Assembly election: Peren
Party	Candidate	Votes	%	±%
UDF	T. Haralu	1,103	36.25%	
Independent	Kielu	810	26.62%	
Independent	Ikwerangbe Meru	567	18.63%	
NNO	Ikiesing Thou	563	18.50%	
Margin of victory		293	9.63%	−39.29%
Turnout		3,043	79.04%	−3.21%
Registered electors		3,850		21.60%
UDF gain from Independent		Swing	-38.21%	

=== Assembly Election 1964 ===
1964 Nagaland Legislative Assembly election: Peren
Party	Candidate	Votes	%	±%
Independent	Longbe	1,624	74.46%	
Independent	Levi	557	25.54%	
Margin of victory		1,067	48.92%	
Turnout		2,181	82.25%	
Registered electors		3,166		
Independent win (new seat)				

== See also ==
- List of constituencies of the Nagaland Legislative Assembly
- Peren district
