= 2014 Indian general election in Nagaland =

Indian general election in Nagaland, 2014
- 9 April

1 seat
- Turnout: 87.91%
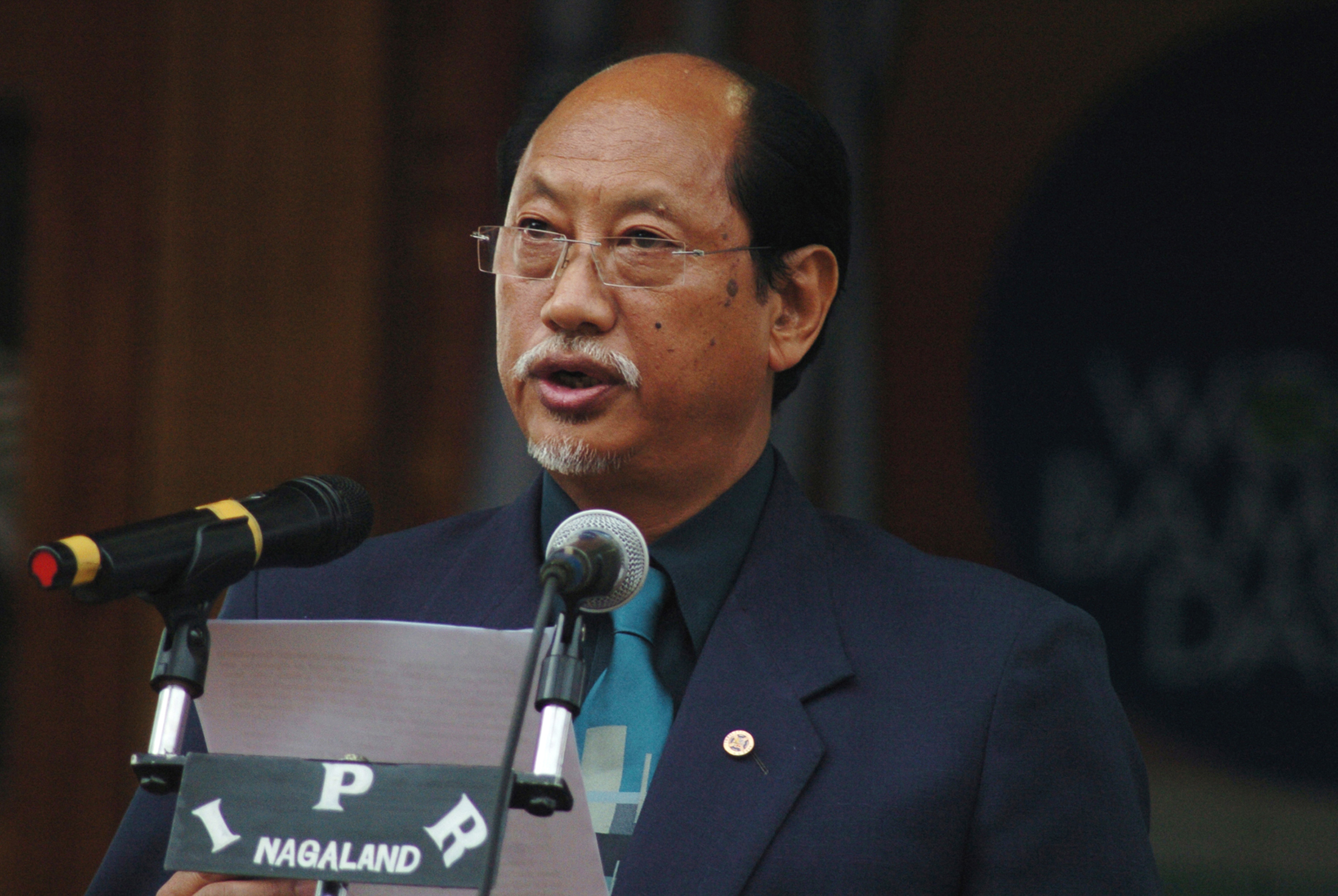
| | First party | Second party |
|---|---|---|
| | | INC |
| Leader | Neiphiu Rio | Viswesül Pusa |
| Party | NPF | INC |
| Seats won | 1 | 0 |
| Seat change | Steady | Steady |
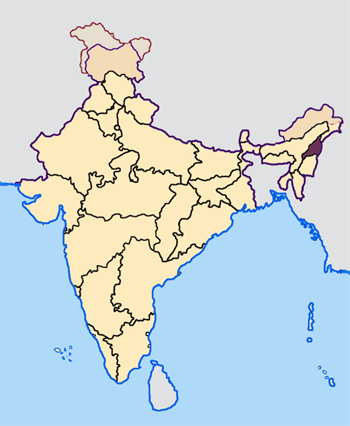
- Nagaland
Prime Minister before election
Manmohan Singh
INC
Prime Minister after election
Narendra Modi
BJP

The 2014 Indian general election polls in Nagaland for Lok Sabha (lower house) seats were held in a single phase on 9 April 2014. As of 10 February 2014 the total voter strength of Nagaland was 1,174,663.

The main political parties in Nagaland were Nagaland Peoples Front (NPF) and Indian National Congress (INC).

Despite threats from insurgent militant groups in Northeast India, people turned out in large numbers for voting. Voters turnout in Nagaland was more than 87% which was highest in entire India.

== Parties and alliances ==
=== United Progressive Alliance ===
| Party | Flag | Symbol | Leader | Seats contested |
|---|---|---|---|---|
| Indian National Congress | | | Viswesül Pusa | 1 |

=== National Democratic Alliance ===
| Party | Flag | Symbol | Leader | Seats contested |
|---|---|---|---|---|
| Naga People's Front | | | Neiphiu Rio | 1 |

== Opinion polling ==
| Conducted in Month(s) | Ref | Polling Organisation/Agency | | |
| Conducted in Month(s) | Ref | Polling Organisation/Agency | NPF | Others |
| Aug–Oct 2013 | | Times Now-India TV-CVoter | 1 | 0 |
| Jan–Feb 2014 | | Times Now-India TV-CVoter | 1 | 0 |

== Election schedule ==
Constituency wise Election schedule are given below

| Polling Day | Phase | Date | Constituencies |
|---|---|---|---|
| 1 | 2 | 9 April | Nagaland |

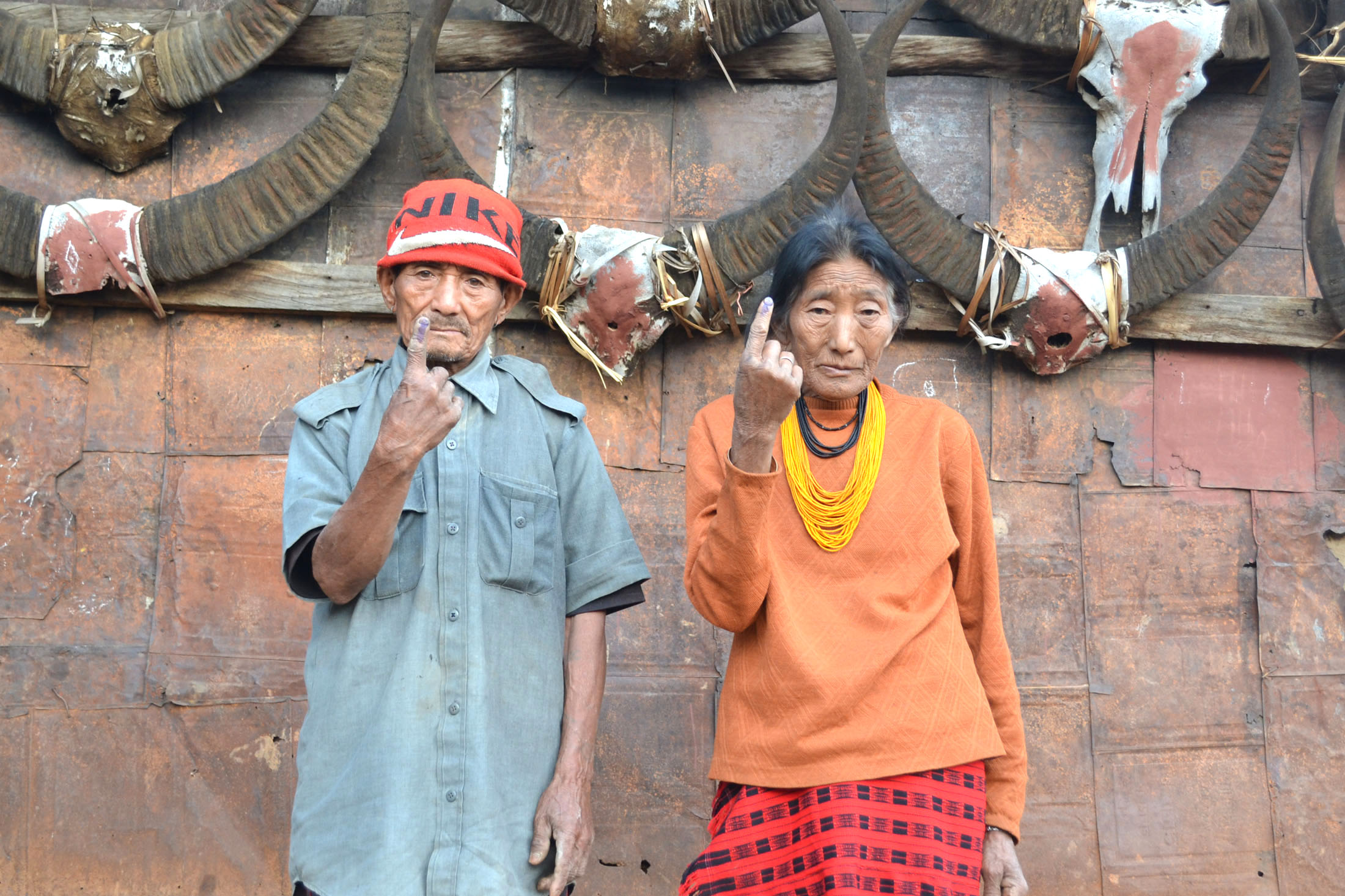
An elderly couple from Kiphire district after casting their votes.

== Results ==
=== Constituency Wise ===
| Constituency | | Winner | | | | Runner-up | | | | Margin | |
| Constituency | | Candidate | Party | Votes | % | Candidate | Party | Votes | % | Votes | % |
|---|---|---|---|---|---|---|---|---|---|---|---|
| 1 | Nagaland | Neiphiu Rio | NPF | 713,372 | 68.67 | Viswesül Pusa | INC | 313,147 | 30.14 | 400,225 | 38.52 |

=== Results by Party ===
| Party Name | Popular vote | | | Seats | | |
| Party Name | Votes | % | ±pp | Contested | Won | +/− |
|---|---|---|---|---|---|---|
| NPF | 7,13,372 | 68.60 | ▼1.36 | 1 | 1 | Steady |
| INC | 3,13,147 | 30.11 | ▲0.76 | 1 | 0 | Steady |
| SP(I) | 9,695 | 0.93 | Steady | 1 | 0 | Steady |
| NOTA | 2,696 | 0.26 | Steady | | | |
| Total | 10,38,910 | 100% | - | 3 | 1 | - |

== Bye-election ==
The by-election was necessary because Neiphiu Rio resigned from the Nagaland Lok Sabha seat to contest the 2018 Nagaland Assembly election. The results for the by-election is as follow (Elected on 31 May 2018)

=== Results ===
| Constituency | | Winner | | | | Runner-up | | | | Margin | |
| Constituency | | Candidate | Party | Votes | % | Candidate | Party | Votes | % | Votes | % |
|---|---|---|---|---|---|---|---|---|---|---|---|
| 1 | Nagaland | Tokheho Yepthomi | NDPP | 594,205 | 58.56 | C. Apok Jamir | NPF | 420,459 | 41.44 | 173,746 | 17.12 |

- Tokheho Yepthomi belonged to the Nationalist Democratic Progressive Party (NDPP) and was the consensus candidate of the People’s Democratic Alliance (PDA).
- C. Apok Jamir was the candidate of the Naga People's Front (NPF).
- Tokheho Yepthomi defeated C. Apok Jamir by a margin of 173,746 votes in the by-election.

== Assembly segments wise lead of Parties ==
| Party | Assembly segments | Position in Assembly (as of 2018 elections) |
|---|---|---|
| Naga People's Front | 52 | 26 |
| Indian National Congress | 8 | 0 |
| Others | 0 | 34 |
| Total | 60 | |

=== Constituency Wise ===
| Constituency | | Winner | | | Runner-up | | | Margin |
| # | Name | Candidate | Party | Votes | Candidate | Party | Votes | Margin |
