= Karong Assembly constituency =

Legislative Assembly constituency in Manipur State, India

Coordinates: 25.3°N 94.04°E

Karong
- Constituency No. 47 for the Manipur Legislative Assembly

Constituency details
- Country: India
- Region: Northeast India
- State: Manipur
- District: Senapati
- Lok Sabha constituency: Outer Manipur
- Established: 1972
- Total electors: 54,916 (2022)
- Reservation: ST

Member of Legislative Assembly
- 12th Manipur Legislative Assembly
- Incumbent J Kumo Sha
- Party: Independent
- Elected year: 2022

Karong is one of the 60 Legislative Assembly constituencies of Manipur state in India.

It is part of Senapati district and is reserved for candidates belonging to the Scheduled Tribes.

== Members of the Legislative Assembly ==
Year	Winner	Party
1972	K. Envey	Independent politician
1974	K. S. Benjamin Banee	Independent politician
1980	Vio	Independent politician
1984	Benjamin Banee	Independent politician
1990	K. S. Benjamin Banee	Indian National Congress
1995	L. Jonathan	Samata Party
2000	L. Jonathan	Indian National Congress
2002	P. S. Henry Paotei	Federal Party of Manipur
2007	D. D. Thaisii	Indian National Congress
2012	Dr. V. Alexander Pao	Naga People's Front
2017	D. D. Thaisii	Indian National Congress
2022	J. Kumo Sha	Independent politician

== Election results ==
Vote share of winning candidates
2022	34.83%
2017	31.84%
2012	58.15%
2007	31.58%
2002	23.81%
2000	28.26%
1995	40.03%
1990	40.32%
1984	31.70%
1980	36.30%
1974	40.16%
1972	52.01%

=== 2027 Assembly election ===
2027 Manipur Legislative Assembly election: Karong
Party	Candidate	Votes	%	±%
INC				
NDA				
NOTA	None of the above			
Majority				
Turnout				
gain from		Swing		

=== 2022 Assembly election ===
2022 Manipur Legislative Assembly election: Karong
Party	Candidate	Votes	%	±%
Independent	J. Kumo Sha	17,191	34.83%	
BJP	R. Yuh Jonathan Tao	13,649	27.65%	5.55%
NPF	Khoho Siile Anthony	10,483	21.24%	9.12%
INC	D. D. Thaisii	5,891	11.93%	−19.90%
Independent	Thaiba Sanii	2,102	4.26%	
Margin of victory		3,542	7.18%	−2.56%
Turnout		49,360	89.88%	5.56%
Registered electors		54,916		5.01%
Independent gain from INC		Swing	2.99%	

=== 2017 Assembly election ===
2017 Manipur Legislative Assembly election: Karong
Party	Candidate	Votes	%	±%
INC	D D Thaisii	14,038	31.84%	−10.01%
BJP	R. Yuh Jonathan Tao	9,745	22.10%	
Independent	Thaiba Sanii	7,322	16.60%	
Independent	Solomon Vieno	6,553	14.86%	
NPF	Dr. V. Alexander Pao	5,342	12.11%	−46.03%
LJP	T. K. Savanai	951	2.16%	
Margin of victory		4,293	9.74%	−6.56%
Turnout		44,096	84.32%	10.19%
Registered electors		52,295		2.97%
INC gain from NPF		Swing	-26.31%	

=== 2012 Assembly election ===
2012 Manipur Legislative Assembly election: Karong
Party	Candidate	Votes	%	±%
NPF	Dr. V. Alexander Pao	21,891	58.15%	
INC	D. D. Thaisii	15,755	41.85%	10.27%
Margin of victory		6,136	16.30%	13.44%
Turnout		37,647	74.13%	−21.94%
Registered electors		50,786		5.13%
NPF gain from INC		Swing	26.57%	

=== 2007 Assembly election ===
2007 Manipur Legislative Assembly election: Karong
Party	Candidate	Votes	%	±%
INC	D. D. Thaisii	14,655	31.58%	10.78%
Independent	L. Jonathan	13,328	28.72%	
Independent	R. V. Shirang	10,321	22.24%	
Independent	K. S. Benjamin Banee	7,446	16.04%	
Independent	P. S. Henry Paotei	622	1.34%	
Margin of victory		1,327	2.86%	−0.15%
Turnout		46,407	96.07%	−1.93%
Registered electors		48,307		9.04%
INC gain from FPM		Swing	7.77%	

=== 2002 Assembly election ===
2002 Manipur Legislative Assembly election: Karong
Party	Candidate	Votes	%	±%
FPM	P. S. Henry Paotei	10,304	23.81%	−0.33%
INC	D. D. Thaisii	9,000	20.79%	−7.46%
BJP	R. V. Shirang	7,125	16.46%	2.84%
SAP	L. Jonathan	7,090	16.38%	0.40%
NCP	Solomon Veino	5,716	13.21%	9.31%
Manipur National Conference	P. S. Rowland	4,045	9.35%	
Margin of victory		1,304	3.01%	−1.11%
Turnout		43,280	98.00%	1.72%
Registered electors		44,304		5.43%
FPM gain from INC		Swing	-16.22%	

=== 2000 Assembly election ===
2000 Manipur Legislative Assembly election: Karong
Party	Candidate	Votes	%	±%
INC	L. Jonathan	11,210	28.26%	2.04%
FPM	P. S. Henry Paotei	9,575	24.14%	
SAP	D. D. Thaisii	6,340	15.98%	−24.05%
BJP	R. V. Shirang	5,405	13.62%	
MSCP	R. Yuh Jonathan Tao	3,138	7.91%	
Independent	Kaikhomang Khongsai	2,440	6.15%	
NCP	Solomon Veino	1,547	3.90%	
Margin of victory		1,635	4.12%	−3.81%
Turnout		39,672	95.21%	−1.07%
Registered electors		42,022		20.36%
INC gain from SAP		Swing	-11.77%	

=== 1995 Assembly election ===
1995 Manipur Legislative Assembly election: Karong
Party	Candidate	Votes	%	±%
SAP	L. Jonathan	13,360	40.03%	
MPP	Th. Rapei	10,712	32.09%	6.30%
INC	K. S. Benjamin Banee	8,751	26.22%	−14.11%
Independent	S. P. Henry	554	1.66%	
Margin of victory		2,648	7.93%	1.49%
Turnout		33,377	96.28%	−0.80%
Registered electors		34,913		10.78%
SAP gain from INC		Swing	-0.30%	

=== 1990 Assembly election ===
1990 Manipur Legislative Assembly election: Karong
Party	Candidate	Votes	%	±%
INC	K. S. Benjamin Banee	12,272	40.32%	23.75%
JD	L. Jonathan	10,312	33.88%	
MPP	R. Vio	7,849	25.79%	
Margin of victory		1,960	6.44%	5.76%
Turnout		30,433	97.08%	4.02%
Registered electors		31,516		24.70%
INC gain from Independent		Swing	8.62%	

=== 1984 Assembly election ===
1984 Manipur Legislative Assembly election: Karong
Party	Candidate	Votes	%	±%
Independent	Benjamin Banee	7,370	31.70%	
Independent	R. Vio	7,213	31.03%	
Independent	S. P. Henry	4,811	20.70%	
INC	L. R. Maki	3,852	16.57%	
Margin of victory		157	0.68%	−9.21%
Turnout		23,246	93.06%	10.07%
Registered electors		25,274		23.64%
Independent hold		Swing	-4.60%	

=== 1980 Assembly election ===
1980 Manipur Legislative Assembly election: Karong
Party	Candidate	Votes	%	±%
Independent	Vio	6,057	36.30%	
JP	K. S. Benjamin Banee	4,407	26.41%	
Independent	Th. Liba	3,794	22.74%	
INC(I)	S. P. Henry	2,428	14.55%	
Margin of victory		1,650	9.89%	5.98%
Turnout		16,686	82.99%	1.52%
Registered electors		20,441		40.11%
Independent hold		Swing	-3.86%	

=== 1974 Assembly election ===
1974 Manipur Legislative Assembly election: Karong
Party	Candidate	Votes	%	±%
Independent	K. S. Benjamin Banee	4,681	40.16%	
Manipur Hills Union	Vio	4,225	36.24%	
KNA	Kundou	1,354	11.62%	
INC	Rama	512	4.39%	−27.48%
INC(O)	D. Thoiso	450	3.86%	
Independent	L. Thingaleng	435	3.73%	
Margin of victory		456	3.91%	0.80%
Turnout		11,657	81.47%	18.38%
Registered electors		14,589		61.58%
Independent hold		Swing	-11.86%	

=== 1972 Assembly election ===
1972 Manipur Legislative Assembly election: Karong
Party	Candidate	Votes	%	±%
Independent	K. Envey	2,922	52.01%	
INC	Athikho Daiho	2,747	31.88%	
Independent	Ngulkholam Haokip	2,052	23.81%	
MPP	Taluba	1,488	17.27%	
Independent	Kongsoi Lutthui	1,271	22.62%	
Independent	Khothang	1,060	12.30%	
ABJS	Lungsobo	1,004	11.65%	
INC	Ngazak	810	14.42%	
Independent	M. Ningchui	615	10.95%	
Independent	Demiailam	267	3.10%	
Margin of victory		175	3.11%	
Turnout		5,618	63.10%	
Registered electors		9,029		
Independent win (new seat)				

== See also ==
- List of constituencies of the Manipur Legislative Assembly
- Senapati district
