= Awangbow Newmai =

Indian politician

Minister for Water Resources and Relief & Disaster Management Government of Manipur
- In office 2022–2025

Minister of Environment, Forest, Climate change and Sericulture Government of Manipur
- In office 2020–2022

Member of the Manipur Legislative Assembly
- Incumbent
- Assumed office 2017
- Preceded by: Z Kikhonbou Newmai
- Constituency: Tamei

Personal details
- Born: 31 December 1968 (age 57) Takou Village, Manipur
- Party: Naga People's Front
- Spouse: Asenliu Newmai
- Children: Adinliu, Sithuiliu, Diphubou Nj
- Parent: Namrang Newmai (father)
- Education: M.A. (Anthropology)
- Alma mater: North-Eastern Hill University
- Profession: Social Worker

Awangbow Newmai is an Indian politician and the President of Naga People's Front State Unit in Manipur. He was elected to the Manipur Legislative Assembly from Tamei in 2007 as an Independent Candidate and as Naga People's Front Candidate in the 2017, and 2022 Manipur Legislative Assembly election, respectively. In 2022 March 21 he was sworn in N. Biren Singh Second ministry as Minister for Water Resources and Relief & Disaster Management. He was former Minister of Environment, Forest and Climate Change (2020-2022) in N. Biren Singh first ministry.
