= Politics of Nagaland =

The key political players in Nagaland state in north-east India are the ruling Naga People's Front, Indian National Congress, Bharatiya Janata Party, Janata Dal (United) and Nationalist Congress Party.

== National politics ==
Chief Minister of Nagaland that time, Neiphiu Rio has been chosen as the candidate of Democratic Alliance of Nagaland's for the lone Lok Sabha constituency of the state. Rio defeated closest Indian National Congress rival K.V. Pusa by 4,00,225 votes, which is the second highest winning margin after Narendra Modi in the country

== State politics ==
The Nagaland Legislative Assembly has 60 seats directly elected from single-seat constituencies.

== See also ==
- Nagaland Legislative Assembly
