= Vamüzo Phesao =

Indian politician

Vamuzo Phesao

8th Chief Minister of Nagaland
- In office 19 June 1990 – 2 April 1992
- Preceded by: K. L. Chishi
- Succeeded by: S. C. Jamir

Personal details
- Born: 1938 Yorüba, Naga Hills District, Assam Province, British India (Now in Phek District, Nagaland, India)
- Died: 22 March 2000 (aged 61–62) Kohima, Nagaland, India
- Party: Nagaland People's Council
- Spouse: Sano Vamuzo

Vamuzo Phesao was a Naga politician. He became the Chief Minister of Nagaland in 1990. His government was dismissed and President's rule was imposed in 1992

== Life ==
Phesao was born in 1938.

He became the Chief Minister of Nagaland in 1990. His government was dismissed and President's rule was imposed in 1992

== Personal life ==
Phesao married Sano. His wife, Sano Vamuzo was awarded the Padma Shri in 2024 for social work. This included her work with the Naga Mothers' Association and Nagaland Women Commission in the past.

== Death ==
On 22 March 2000, Phesao died of a heart attack at his residence in Kohima.
