= Tamei Assembly constituency =

Legislative Assembly constituency in Manipur State, India

Coordinates: 25.16°N 93.68°E

Tamei
- Constituency for the Manipur Legislative Assembly

Constituency details
- Country: India
- Region: Northeast India
- State: Manipur
- District: Tamenglong
- Lok Sabha constituency: Outer Manipur
- Established: 1967
- Total electors: 42,117
- Reservation: ST

Member of Legislative Assembly
- 12th Manipur Legislative Assembly
- Incumbent Awangbow Newmai
- Party: NPF
- Alliance: NDA
- Elected year: 2022

Tamei is one of the 60 Vidhan Sabha constituencies in the Indian state of Manipur.

It is part of Tamenglong district and is reserved for candidates belonging to the Scheduled Tribes.

== Members of Assembly ==
- 1967: D. Kipgen, Independent
- 1972: Pauheu, Independent
- 1974: Pauheu, Independent
- 1980: I. D. Dijuanang, Indian National Congress (I)
- 1984: I. D. Dijuanang, Independent
- 1990: I. D. Dijuanang, Indian National Congress (I)
- 1995: D. P. Panmei, Independent
- 2000: Z. Mangaibou, Manipur State Congress Party
- 2002: Z. Mangaibou, Indian National Congress (I)
- 2007: Awangbow Newmei, Independent
- 2012: Kikhonbou Newmai, Indian National Congress (I)

Year	Member	Party
2017	Awangbow Newmai	Naga People's Front

== Election results ==
Vote share of winning candidates
2022	50.83%
2017	49.34%
2012	47.78%
2007	27.87%
2002	41.56%
2000	42.82%
1995	25.22%
1990	35.73%
1984	37.04%
1980	44.66%
1974	41.15%
1972	24.11%
1967	45.87%

=== 2027 Assembly election ===
2027 Manipur Legislative Assembly election: Tamei
Party	Candidate	Votes	%	±%
INC				
NDA				
NOTA	None of the above			
Majority				
Turnout				
gain from		Swing		

=== Assembly Election 2022 ===
2022 Manipur Legislative Assembly election: Tamei
Party	Candidate	Votes	%	±%
NPF	Awangbow Newmai	19,643	50.83%	1.49%
NPP	Kikhonbou Newmai	17,945	46.44%	
BJP	Wilubou Newmai	627	1.62%	−45.40%
INC	G. N. Kumuiteung (Dr. Aku)	397	1.03%	−2.49%
Margin of victory		1,698	4.39%	2.08%
Turnout		38,644	91.75%	3.10%
Registered electors		42,117		15.62%
NPF hold		Swing	1.49%	

=== Assembly Election 2017 ===
2017 Manipur Legislative Assembly election: Tamei
Party	Candidate	Votes	%	±%
NPF	Awangbow Newmai	15,933	49.34%	42.68%
BJP	Kikhonbou Newmai	15,186	47.02%	
INC	G. N. Kumuiteung (Dr. Aku)	1,136	3.52%	−44.26%
Margin of victory		747	2.31%	−3.77%
Turnout		32,295	88.66%	14.90%
Registered electors		36,427		16.94%
NPF gain from INC		Swing	1.55%	

=== Assembly Election 2012 ===
2012 Manipur Legislative Assembly election: Tamei
Party	Candidate	Votes	%	±%
INC	Kikhonbou Newmai	10,977	47.78%	21.48%
MSCP	Awangbow Newmai	9,579	41.70%	
NPF	Athuan Abonmei	1,530	6.66%	
AITC	D. P. Panmei	884	3.85%	
Margin of victory		1,398	6.09%	4.52%
Turnout		22,973	73.74%	−12.97%
Registered electors		31,149		6.92%
INC gain from Independent		Swing	19.91%	

=== Assembly Election 2007 ===
2007 Manipur Legislative Assembly election: Tamei
Party	Candidate	Votes	%	±%
Independent	Awangbow Newmai	7,042	27.87%	
INC	Z. Mangaibou	6,646	26.31%	−15.26%
Independent	Helkhomang Singson	4,266	16.89%	
Independent	Lungsu Panmei	3,636	14.39%	
Independent	Athuan Abonmei	3,438	13.61%	
SAP	Helkhomang Singson	237	0.94%	−20.78%
Margin of victory		396	1.57%	−3.27%
Turnout		25,265	86.72%	−9.05%
Registered electors		29,134		16.71%
Independent gain from INC		Swing	-13.69%	

=== Assembly Election 2002 ===
2002 Manipur Legislative Assembly election: Tamei
Party	Candidate	Votes	%	±%
INC	Z. Mangaibou	9,893	41.56%	28.53%
BJP	Athuan Abonmei	8,742	36.72%	
SAP	Lungsu Panmei	5,169	21.71%	19.51%
Margin of victory		1,151	4.84%	−20.30%
Turnout		23,804	95.77%	3.59%
Registered electors		24,962		3.67%
INC gain from MSCP		Swing	16.34%	

=== Assembly Election 2000 ===
2000 Manipur Legislative Assembly election: Tamei
Party	Candidate	Votes	%	±%
MSCP	Mangaibou	9,506	42.82%	
FPM	Athuan Abonmei	3,926	17.68%	
NCP	D. P. Panmei	3,665	16.51%	
INC	I. D. Sangpiliu	2,894	13.03%	−7.13%
Independent	A. G. Pangim	1,681	7.57%	
SAP	Helkhomang Singson	489	2.20%	−6.75%
Margin of victory		5,580	25.13%	21.92%
Turnout		22,202	93.05%	0.87%
Registered electors		24,079		9.60%
MSCP gain from Independent		Swing	17.59%	

=== Assembly Election 1995 ===
1995 Manipur Legislative Assembly election: Tamei
Party	Candidate	Votes	%	±%
Independent	D. P. Panmei	5,047	25.22%	
MPP	Mangaibou	4,405	22.01%	1.63%
INC	Pauheu	4,036	20.17%	−15.56%
IC(S)	Kaiphuibou	3,458	17.28%	
SAP	A. G. Pangim	1,792	8.96%	
JD	Dijuanang	1,273	6.36%	
Margin of victory		642	3.21%	−10.29%
Turnout		20,011	92.18%	−2.94%
Registered electors		21,970		−4.42%
Independent gain from INC		Swing	-10.51%	

=== Assembly Election 1990 ===
1990 Manipur Legislative Assembly election: Tamei
Party	Candidate	Votes	%	±%
INC	I. D. Dijuanang	7,725	35.73%	13.60%
Independent	N. Pauheu	4,807	22.23%	
MPP	Mangaibou	4,406	20.38%	
INS(SCS)	Seipu	4,369	20.21%	
JD	Changanangbou	314	1.45%	
Margin of victory		2,918	13.50%	−1.41%
Turnout		21,621	95.12%	13.98%
Registered electors		22,985		23.04%
INC gain from Independent		Swing	-1.31%	

=== Assembly Election 1984 ===
1984 Manipur Legislative Assembly election: Tamei
Party	Candidate	Votes	%	±%
Independent	I. D. Dijuanang	5,455	37.04%	
INC	N. Pouhe	3,259	22.13%	
KNA	Chungthang	2,503	16.99%	
Independent	A. G. Pangim	1,974	13.40%	
Independent	Phiangrongdi Panmei	946	6.42%	
BJP	N. K. Singh	560	3.80%	
Margin of victory		2,196	14.91%	−3.58%
Turnout		14,729	81.14%	3.14%
Registered electors		18,681		21.20%
Independent gain from INC(I)		Swing	-7.63%	

=== Assembly Election 1980 ===
1980 Manipur Legislative Assembly election: Tamei
Party	Candidate	Votes	%	±%
INC(I)	I. D. Dijuanang	5,211	44.66%	
Independent	Ilunang	3,054	26.18%	
JP	N. Paubau	2,847	24.40%	
CPI	G. L. Gaising	555	4.76%	
Margin of victory		2,157	18.49%	5.56%
Turnout		11,667	78.00%	3.67%
Registered electors		15,413		40.14%
INC(I) gain from Manipur Hills Union		Swing	3.52%	

=== Assembly Election 1974 ===
1974 Manipur Legislative Assembly election: Tamei
Party	Candidate	Votes	%	±%
Manipur Hills Union	Pauheu	3,287	41.15%	
INC	Dijuanang	2,254	28.22%	4.97%
Independent	Lamkholen	1,672	20.93%	
Independent	R. Tale	775	9.70%	
Margin of victory		1,033	12.93%	12.10%
Turnout		7,988	74.33%	14.68%
Registered electors		10,998		25.43%
Manipur Hills Union gain from Independent		Swing	17.04%	

=== Assembly Election 1972 ===
1972 Manipur Legislative Assembly election: Tamei
Party	Candidate	Votes	%	±%
Independent	Pauheu	1,224	24.11%	
Independent	R. Rajanglung	1,182	23.29%	
INC	Id Bijuanang	1,180	23.25%	17.16%
MPP	Lalkholen	747	14.72%	
Independent	R. Talf	743	14.64%	
Margin of victory		42	0.83%	−8.34%
Turnout		5,076	59.65%	29.78%
Registered electors		8,768		−29.48%
Independent hold		Swing	-21.76%	

=== Assembly Election 1967 ===
1967 Manipur Legislative Assembly election: Tamei
Party	Candidate	Votes	%	±%
Independent	D. Kipgen	1,621	45.87%	
Independent	H. Ngailert	1,297	36.70%	
Independent	K. Amaba	352	9.96%	
INC	D. Athiba	215	6.08%	
Independent	A. Kabui	49	1.39%	
Margin of victory		324	9.17%	
Turnout		3,534	29.86%	
Registered electors		12,433		
Independent win (new seat)				

== See also ==
- Manipur Legislative Assembly
- List of constituencies of Manipur Legislative Assembly
- Tamenglong district
