= Mongoya Assembly constituency =

Legislative Assembly constituency in Nagaland State, India

Coordinates: 26.36°N 94.56°E

Mongoya
- Constituency No. 25 for the Nagaland Legislative Assembly

Constituency details
- Country: India
- Region: Northeast India
- State: Nagaland
- District: Mokokchung
- Lok Sabha constituency: Nagaland
- Established: 1964
- Total electors: 17,448
- Reservation: ST

Member of Legislative Assembly
- 14th Nagaland Legislative Assembly
- Incumbent Imkongmar
- Party: NPF
- Alliance: NDA
- Elected year: 2023

Mongoya is one of the 60 Legislative Assembly constituencies of Nagaland state in India.

It is part of Mokokchung district and is reserved for candidates belonging to the Scheduled Tribes.

== Members of the Legislative Assembly ==
Year	Member	Party
2003	S. Supongmeren Jamir	Indian National Congress
2008	Ngangshi K. Ao	Independent politician
2013	Merentoshi R. Jamir	Nagaland People's Front
2018	Ngangshi K Ao	Nagaland People's Front
2023	Imkongmar	Nationalist Democratic Progressive Party

== Election results ==
=== 2023 Assembly election ===
2023 Nagaland Legislative Assembly election: Mongoya
Party	Candidate	Votes	%	±%
NDPP	Imkongmar	6,818	41.91%	−6.19%
INC	S. Supongmeren Jamir	5,776	35.51%	
NPF	Moasangba Jamir	3,640	22.38%	−28.29%
NOTA	Nota	34	0.21%	
Margin of victory		1,042	6.41%	3.84%
Turnout		16,268	93.24%	8.41%
Registered electors		17,448		8.95%
NDPP gain from NPF		Swing	-8.76%	

=== 2018 Assembly election ===
2018 Nagaland Legislative Assembly election: Mongoya
Party	Candidate	Votes	%	±%
NPF	Dr. Ngangshi K. Ao	6,883	50.67%	−17.22%
NDPP	Alemtemshi Jamir	6,535	48.10%	
NPP	S. Supongmeren Jamir	151	1.11%	
NOTA	None of the Above	16	0.12%	
Margin of victory		348	2.56%	−33.53%
Turnout		13,585	84.83%	−2.69%
Registered electors		16,014		8.03%
NPF hold		Swing	-17.22%	

=== 2013 Assembly election ===
2013 Nagaland Legislative Assembly election: Mongoya
Party	Candidate	Votes	%	±%
NPF	Merentoshi R. Jamir	8,808	67.89%	52.53%
INC	Dr. Ngangshi K. Ao	4,125	31.79%	0.12%
Margin of victory		4,683	36.10%	13.70%
Turnout		12,974	87.52%	5.10%
Registered electors		14,824		−9.81%
NPF gain from Independent		Swing	13.82%	

=== 2008 Assembly election ===
2008 Nagaland Legislative Assembly election: Mongoya
Party	Candidate	Votes	%	±%
Independent	Dr. Ngangshi K. Ao	7,325	54.07%	
INC	Supongmeren	4,291	31.67%	−35.95%
NPF	Aochuba	2,081	15.36%	−14.68%
BJP	Takusungba	88	0.65%	−1.69%
Margin of victory		3,034	22.39%	−15.20%
Turnout		13,548	83.87%	−4.62%
Registered electors		16,437		36.24%
Independent gain from INC		Swing	-13.56%	

=== 2003 Assembly election ===
2003 Nagaland Legislative Assembly election: Mongoya
Party	Candidate	Votes	%	±%
INC	S. Supongmeren Jamir	7,081	67.62%	
NPF	Nungsanginba	3,145	30.04%	
BJP	Temjensoba	245	2.34%	
Margin of victory		3,936	37.59%	
Turnout		10,471	87.05%	−11.22%
Registered electors		12,065		7.46%
INC hold		Swing	17.81%	

=== 1998 Assembly election ===
1998 Nagaland Legislative Assembly election: Mongoya
Party	Candidate	Votes	%	±%
INC	T. Imtimeren Jamir	Unopposed		
Registered electors		11,227		1.44%
INC hold		Swing		

=== 1993 Assembly election ===
1993 Nagaland Legislative Assembly election: Mongoya
Party	Candidate	Votes	%	±%
INC	N. I. Jamir	5,389	49.82%	−14.75%
Independent	Temjentoshi	4,863	44.96%	
NPF	Aochuba	565	5.22%	−30.21%
Margin of victory		526	4.86%	−24.28%
Turnout		10,817	98.27%	15.27%
Registered electors		11,068		24.79%
INC hold		Swing	-14.75%	

=== 1989 Assembly election ===
1989 Nagaland Legislative Assembly election: Mongoya
Party	Candidate	Votes	%	±%
INC	N. I. Jamir	4,713	64.57%	5.64%
NPF	Nungsanginba	2,586	35.43%	
Margin of victory		2,127	29.14%	−12.00%
Turnout		7,299	83.00%	1.22%
Registered electors		8,869		0.15%
INC hold		Swing	5.64%	

=== 1987 Assembly election ===
1987 Nagaland Legislative Assembly election: Mongoya
Party	Candidate	Votes	%	±%
INC	N. I. Jamir	4,220	58.93%	3.26%
Independent	J. Maputemjen	1,274	17.79%	
NND	Nungsanginba	994	13.88%	−30.08%
NPP	N. T. Soba Ao	673	9.40%	
Margin of victory		2,946	41.14%	29.43%
Turnout		7,161	81.78%	16.41%
Registered electors		8,856		−3.30%
INC hold		Swing	3.26%	

=== 1982 Assembly election ===
1982 Nagaland Legislative Assembly election: Mongoya
Party	Candidate	Votes	%	±%
INC	N. I. Jamir	3,289	55.67%	
NND	Sentiyangba	2,597	43.96%	
Margin of victory		692	11.71%	2.57%
Turnout		5,908	65.36%	−19.83%
Registered electors		9,158		85.23%
INC gain from UDA		Swing	1.10%	

=== 1977 Assembly election ===
1977 Nagaland Legislative Assembly election: Mongoya
Party	Candidate	Votes	%	±%
UDA	T. Imtimeren Jamir	2,275	54.57%	4.36%
Independent	Aoshingang	1,894	45.43%	
Margin of victory		381	9.14%	−13.41%
Turnout		4,169	85.19%	15.15%
Registered electors		4,944		−27.54%
UDA hold		Swing	4.36%	

=== 1974 Assembly election ===
1974 Nagaland Legislative Assembly election: Mongoya
Party	Candidate	Votes	%	±%
UDA	Imtimeren	2,347	50.21%	
NNO	Temjensoba	1,293	27.66%	
Independent	Kilensowa	1,034	22.12%	
Margin of victory		1,054	22.55%	
Turnout		4,674	70.04%	
Registered electors		6,823		
UDA gain from NNO		Swing		

=== 1971 Assembly by-election ===
1971 Nagaland Legislative Assembly by-election: Mongoya
Party	Candidate	Votes	%	±%
NNO	C. Jamir	1,630		
Independent	Likokwati	1,176		
UDF	Shilukaba	1,162		
Margin of victory		454		
NNO gain from UDF		Swing		

=== 1969 Assembly election ===
1969 Nagaland Legislative Assembly election: Mongoya
Party	Candidate	Votes	%	±%
UDF	Takomeren	984	36.94%	
NNO	Imtimeren	961	36.07%	
Independent	Imzuluba	719	26.99%	
Margin of victory		23	0.86%	
Turnout		2,664	90.70%	
Registered electors		2,947		
UDF gain from Independent		Swing		

=== 1966 Assembly by-election ===
1966 Nagaland Legislative Assembly by-election: Mongoya
Party	Candidate	Votes	%	±%
Independent	T. Imtimeren Jamir	Unopposed		
Independent hold		Swing		

=== 1964 Assembly election ===
1964 Nagaland Legislative Assembly election: Mongoya
Party	Candidate	Votes	%	±%
Independent	Bendangangshi	1,258	80.69%	
Independent	Tenomayang Ao	301	19.31%	
Margin of victory		957	61.39%	
Turnout		1,559	66.65%	
Registered electors		2,363		
Independent win (new seat)				

== See also ==
- List of constituencies of the Nagaland Legislative Assembly
- Mokokchung district
