= 2017 Nagaland protests =

2017 protests in Nagaland

- Date: January – February 2017
- Location: Nagaland
- Caused by: Announcement of 33% women reservation to be implemented in Civic Elections; Killings of two of the protesters, fueling anger and calls for revenge in different districts
- Goals: Revoking of the 33% women reservation in Civic Elections; Overthrow of the T. R. Zeliang Ministry; Suspension of policemen responsible for the deaths of protestors
- Methods: Protests, demonstrations, riots, roadblocks, barricades
- Result: Civic Elections postponed indefinitely; T. R. Zeliang resigns as the Chief Minister of Nagaland; Police brutality, two protestors killed, dozens injured

Parties
Civilian protesters: Civil Organizations of all the ethnic groups of Nagaland; Naga Hoho	Government of Nagaland; Naga People's Front; Naga Mothers' Association; Riot police

Lead figures
No centralised leadership	T. R. Zeliang; Shürhozelie Liezietsu; Rosemary Dzüvichü

Casualties
- Deaths: 2
- Injuries: dozens

The 2017 Nagaland protests were a series of protests and civil unrest in the northeastern Indian state of Nagaland that began on 27 January 2017 following the announcement of the 33% women reservation in the Civic Elections by the Government of Nagaland with violence beginning on the night of 31 January after the killings of two protestors by security forces. The civil unrest began in Dimapur, and later spread to various districts of Nagaland. The unrest grew rapidly after the killings, with people from different parts of Nagaland joining in the protests.

The Naga ethnic organizations believes that granting 33% women reservation is a violation of the right granted to Naga ethnic groups as per the Article 371(A) of the Indian Constitution.

== Timeline ==
=== 27 January ===
On 27 January, T. R. Zeliang, the then-Chief Minister of Nagaland announced that the elections to the Urban Local Bodies would be held on 1 February. The following days, Nagaland went into a shutdown called upon by various Civil Organizations.

=== 31 January ===
On 31 January, a large group of protestors gathered at Zeliang's private residence at 3rd Mile, Dimapur. A police force tried to stop them around 9:30 p.m. and in the ensuing violence between the police and the mob, two civilian protestors were killed and several others were injured in clash.

In Longleng, seven people were left injured after police fired at protestors in order to prevent the mob from entering the Office of the Deputy Commissioner of Longleng.

In response to the protests, the government of Nagaland blocked access to Mobile Internet accessibility, to reduce the protesters' ability to organize.

=== 1 February ===
On 1 February, thousands of protestors arrived at Kohima along with the coffins of the two dead bodies. The protesters threatened to bury the bodies in front of the homes of the Chief Minister T. R. Zeliang and the ruling Naga People's Front's (NPF) President Shürhozelie Liezietsu if their demands were not fulfilled.

=== 2 February ===
On 2 February, the situation got worse as mobs set fire to the office building of the Kohima Municipal Council. The fire spread to the adjoining Transport Authority Office, State Information Commission, Urban Development Department, Railway Reservation Centre and the Kohima Press Club and significantly damaging some private buildings. Several government vehicles were also damaged. At 7:00 p.m., indefinite curfew was imposed in the city.

== Response ==
The government of Nagaland in response postponed the Civic Elections indefinitely. On 19 February, T. R. Zeliang steps down as the Chief Minister of Nagaland.
