= Ringui Ramhon =

- Village
- Nickname: Ringui
- Location in Manipur, India Ringui Ramhon (India)
- Coordinates: 25°02′17″N 94°14′40″E
- Country: India
- State: Manipur
- District: Ukhrul

Population
  - Total: 750

Languages
  - Official: Tangkhul (Ringui tui)
- Time zone: UTC+5:30 (IST)
- PIN: 795142
- Vehicle registration: MN
- Nearest city: Ukhrul Imphal
- Literacy: 81.06%
- Lok Sabha constituency: Outer Manipur
- Vidhan Sabha constituency: Chingai

Ringui Ramhon is a small village located west of Ukhrul in Ukhrul district, Manipur state, India. The village is about 35 kilometers from Ukhrul partially connected by National Highway 150 that connects Imphal and Kohima via Ukhrul and Jessami. Ringui Ramhon is flanked by Ramva in the east, Tashar in the north, Sinakeithei in the west and Lungpha in the south. Locally, the inhabitants speak Ringui tui which belongs to the Tibeto-Burman language family.

== Total population ==
According to 2011 census, Ringui Ramhon has 64 households with the total of 530 people of which 280 are male and 250 are female. Of the total population, 65 were in the age group of 0–6 years. The average sex ratio of the village is 929 female to 1000 male which is lower than the state average of 985. The literacy rate of the village stands at 90.40% which is higher than the state average 76.94%. Male literacy rate stands at 93.35% while female literacy rate was 87.14%.

== People and occupation ==
The village is home to people of Tangkhul Naga tribe. Majority of the inhabitants are Christians. Initially, the village was home to the Ngalung clan, but with the passage of time, the village now has other clans living along the original Ngalung clans. Agriculture is the primary occupation of the inhabitants. Ringui Ramhon is one of the 44 villages considered likely to be affected as a catchment area when the Mapithel multi purpose project is finally functional. The village produced the first motion pictures in Tangkhul dialect. Dr. Yaronsho Ngalung, a well known social activist and politician and also the incumbent Autonomous District Council Chairman hails from this village.
