= Janghemlung Panmei =

Indian politician

Member of the Manipur Legislative Assembly
- Incumbent
- Assumed office 2022
- Preceded by: Samuel Jendai
- Constituency: Tamenglong

Personal details
- Born: 1 August 1977 (age 49) Tamenglong, Manipur
- Party: National People's Party
- Parent: R.K Ragaisin (father)
- Education: Kirori Mal College, University of Delhi
- Profession: Social Worker

Janghemlung Panmei is an Indian politician from Manipur state. He was elected to the Manipur Legislative Assembly from Tamenglong in the 2012 and 2022 Manipur Legislative Assembly elections.

He was earlier a member of Naga People's Front and Manipur State Congress Party.
