= Won Hla =

Burmese politician

U Won Hla

Member of the Pyithu Hluttaw
- Incumbent
- Assumed office 3 February 2016
- Constituency: Nanyun Township

Personal details
- Born: 17 July 1978 (age 47) Nanyun Township, Myanmar
- Party: National League for Democracy
- Education: Grade 11

Won Hla (born 17 July 1978) is a Burmese politician who currently serves as an Pyithu Hluttaw MP for Nanyun Township. He is a member of the National League for Democracy.

== Early life and education ==
Won Hla was born on 17 July 1978 in Nanyun Township, Myanmar. He is an ethnic Naga.

== Political career ==
He is a member of the National League for Democracy. In the 2015 Myanmar general election, he was elected as an Pyithu Hluttaw member of parliament and elected representative from Nanyun Township
