= Sano Vamuzo =

Indian social worker (born 1940)

Padma Shri Sano Vamuzo
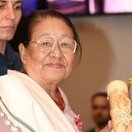
- Vamuzo receiving the Padma Shri award in 2024
- Born: Sano Iralu; 27 March 1940 (age 86); Naga Hills District, Assam Province, British India (Now Nagaland, India)
- Education: B.A. from Guwahati University, B.Ed. from Bombay University, M.A. (Education) from North-Eastern Hill University
- Occupation: Social worker
- Known for: Founding President of the Naga Mothers' Association (NMA)
- Spouse: Vamuzo Phesao
- Relatives: Rano M. Shaiza (sister); Zapu Phizo (maternal uncle)
- Awards: Padma Shri (2024)

Sano Vamuzo (née Iralu; born 27 March 1940) is an Indian social worker and peace activist who was the founding President of the Naga Mothers' Association. She was awarded the Padma Shri award for her contributions to promoting peace and women's representation in the state of Nagaland.

== Early life and education ==
Sano Iralu was born on 27 March 1940 to an Angami Naga family from Khonoma. Her father, Sevilie Iralu was the third Naga doctor and her mother, Vituno Iralu was the elder sister of Zapu Phizo. She pursued her education in Nagaland and completed her higher education in the arts and education fields, culminating in a master's degree in education from North-Eastern Hill University in 1980.

== Career ==
Vamuzo's early involvement in the Naga Mothers' Association (NMA) in 1983 marked the beginning of her efforts to combat alcoholism and drug addiction. Under her presidency from 1984 to 1991, the NMA promoted social integrity, peace and the empowerment of women.

== Awards and honors ==
In 2024, Vamuzo was honored with the Padma Shri Award, one of India's highest civilian awards. It was awarded by the President of India, Droupadi Murmu.
