= Yaronsho Ngalung =

Indian activist (born 1978)

- Born: 21 January 1978 (age 48); Ringui Ramhon
- Education: Jawahalar Nehru University
- Occupations: Chairman, Autonomous District Council Ukhrul

Yaronsho Ngalung (born 21 January 1978) is a social activist, scholar and a politician from the Tangkhul Naga tribe in the state of Manipur, India. He hails from Ringui Ramhon village situated 30 kilometers south west of Ukhrul district headquarters. As of 2015, he was the sitting chairman of the recently re-organised Autonomous District Council (ADC): elected from 15 DCC Ringui Constituency.

== Early life ==
Yaronsho Ngalung was born in Ringui Ramhon to Stone Ngalung and Yangreila Ngalung on 21 January 1978. He did his schooling from Savio School Ukhrul. Dr. Ngalung completed his graduation from Delhi University in 1998 and thereafter did his M.A, MPhil and PhD from JNU, Delhi. His doctoral thesis was State Model of Conflict Transformation: Critique from the Nagas Perspective, done under the supervision of Professor Rakesh Gupta.

== Career ==
During his University days at Jawaharlal Nehru University, Ngalung was an active participant in both political and social movements. After completing his doctorate degree in political science from JNU, Ngalung dedicated his time in working for the Nagas in the present state of Manipur. With the re-organization of the Autonomous District Council in Manipur after a gap of more than two decades, he contested the election with Naga People's Front party (NPF) ticket from 15 DCC Ringui constituency and was elected by a great margin. After the election, he was unanimously elected the chairman of the council.
