= Kyaw Htay =

Burmese politician

U Kyaw Htay

Member of the Pyithu Hluttaw
- Incumbent
- Assumed office 3 February 2016
- Constituency: Leshi Township

Personal details
- Born: 2 December 1977 (age 48) Leshi Township, Myanmar
- Party: National League for Democracy
- Education: B.A. (History)

Kyaw Htay is a Burmese politician who currently serves as an Pyithu Hluttaw MP for Leshi Township. He is a member of the National League for Democracy.

== Early life and education ==
Won Hla was born on 2 December 1977 in Leshi Township, Myanmar. He is an ethnic Naga.

== Political career ==
He is a member of the National League for Democracy. In the 2015 Myanmar general election, he was elected as an Pyithu Hluttaw member of parliament and as a representative from Leshi Township
