= Nagaland Pradesh Congress Committee =

Indian political party

- President: S. Supongmeren Jamir
- Headquarters: Old Secretariat Complex, Kohima, Nagaland 797001
- Ideology: Populism; Social liberalism; Democratic socialism; Social democracy; Secularism
- ECI Status: A State Unit of Indian National Congress
- Alliance: Indian National Developmental Inclusive Alliance
- Seats in Rajya Sabha: 0 / 1
- Seats in Lok Sabha: 1 / 1
- Seats in Nagaland Legislative Assembly Seats in Nagaland Urban Local Bodies: 0 / 60 7 / 278

Election symbol

Website
- INC Nagaland

The Nagaland Pradesh Congress Committee (NPCC) is the unit of the Indian National Congress for the state of Nagaland, India. Its head office is situated in Kohima, the capital city of Nagaland.

The NPCC is responsible for organizing and coordinating the party's activities and campaigns within the state, as well as selecting candidates for local, state, and national elections. The current president of the NPCC is S. Supongmeren Jamir.

== Structure and composition ==
S.No.	Name	Designation	Incharge
1.	S. Supongmeren Jamir	President	Nagaland Pradesh Congress Committee
2.	C. Apok Jamir	Working President	Nagaland Pradesh Congress Committee

== Nagaland Legislative Assembly election ==
Year	Party leader	Seats won	Change in seats	Outcome
1964		0 / 40	▲new	Opposition
1969		0 / 40	Steady	Opposition
1974		0 / 60	Steady	Opposition
1977	John Bosco Jasokie	15 / 60	▲15	Opposition
1982	S.C. Jamir	24 / 60	▲9	Government
1987	Hokishe Sema	34 / 60	▲10	Government
1989	S.C. Jamir	36 / 60	▲2	Government
1993	S.C. Jamir	35 / 60	▼1	Government
1998	S.C. Jamir	53 / 60	▲18	Government
2003	S.C. Jamir	21 / 60	▼32	Opposition
2008	Viswesül Pusa	23 / 60	▲2	Opposition
2013	C. Apok Jamir	8 / 60	▼15	Opposition
2018	Kewekhape Therie	0 / 60	▼8	Opposition
2023	Kewekhape Therie	0 / 60	Steady	Opposition

== Performance in Lok Sabha ==
Lok Sabha Elections
Year	Lok Sabha	Seats contested	Seats won	(+/-) in seats	% of votes	Vote swing	Popular vote	Outcome
1967	4th	0	0 / 1	Steady	0.00%	Steady	0	Government
1971	5th	0	0 / 1	Steady	0.00%	Steady	0	Government
1977	6th	1	0 / 1	New entry	48.32%	New entry	1,16,527	Opposition
1980	7th	0	0 / 1	Steady	0.00%	Steady	0	Government
1984	8th	1	1 / 1	▲1	64.64%	▲16.32	2,51,101	Government
1989	9th	1	1 / 1	Steady	60.29%	▼4.35	3,63,071	Opposition
1991	10th	1	0 / 1	▼1	44.34%	▼15.95	2,76,161	Government
1996	11th	1	1 / 1	▲1	62.31%	▲17.97	4,72,102	Opposition
1998	12th	1	1 / 1	Steady	86.70%	▲24.39	3,44,223	Opposition
1999	13th	1	1 / 1	Steady	71.18%	▼15.52	5,16,119	Opposition
2004	14th	1	0 / 1	▼1	25.78%	▼45.40	2,46,109	Government
2009	15th	1	0 / 1	Steady	29.35%	▲3.57	3,49,203	Government
2014	16th	1	0 / 1	Steady	30.14%	▲0.79	3,13,147	Opposition
2019	17th	1	0 / 1	Steady	48.11%	▲17.97	4,84,166	Opposition
2024	18th	1	1 / 1	▲1	52.83%	▲4.72	4,01,951	Opposition

== List of presidents ==
S.no	President	Portrait	Term	
1.	Kevichusa Angami		1963	1966
2.	Hokishe Sema		1966	1969
3.	S. C. Jamir		1969	1972
4.	K. V. Keditsu		1972	1976
5.	Neiliezhuo Angami		1976	1980
6.	I. Imkong		1980	1983
7.	K. L. Chishi		1983	1987
8.	Chingwang Konyak		1987	?
9.	N. Theyo		June 1995	June 1997
(2).	Hokishe Sema		2004	2008
10.	Viswesül Pusa		2008	2009
11.	I. Imkong		2009	2010
12.	S. I. Jamir		6 October 2010	5 May 2015
13.	Kewekhape Therie		5 May 2015	31 March 2023
14.	S. Supongmeren Jamir		31 March 2023	Incumbent

== See also ==
- Indian National Congress
- Congress Working Committee
- All India Congress Committee
- Pradesh Congress Committee
