= D D Thaisii =

Indian politician

Member of the Manipur Legislative Assembly
- In office 2017–2022
- Preceded by: V Alexander Pao
- Succeeded by: J Kumo Sha
- Constituency: Karong

Personal details
- Born: 1 March 1962 (age 64)
- Party: Indian National Congress
- Children: Ahrai Elizabeth
- Parent: H. Dio (father)
- Profession: Social Worker

D D Thaisii is an Indian politician from Poumai tribe of Manipur. He was elected from Karong Assembly constituency in 2007 and 2017 Manipur Legislative Assembly election and has served as Cabinet Minister in Manipur Legislative Assembly from 2007 to 2012.
