= Samuel Jendai =

Indian politician (born 1959)

Samuel Jendai Kamei

Member of the Manipur Legislative Assembly
- In office 2017–2020
- Preceded by: Janghemlung Panmei
- Succeeded by: Janghemlung Panmei
- Constituency: Tamenglong

Personal details
- Born: 1 May 1959 (age 66) Sempang Village
- Party: Janata Dal United
- Other political affiliations: Bhartiya Janata Party Naga People's Front; Federal Party of Manipur; Manipur State Congress Party Independent
- Spouse: J. Abi Panmei (1984 - 2001)
- Children: Lanbangliu Kamei Chunchamliu Kamei Tamzanthailiu Kamei Gaithoiliu Kamei Rachun Kamei Mazien Kamei
- Parent: K. Gaigonrei (father)
- Profession: Social Worker

Samuel Jendai Kamei (born 1 May 1959) is an Indian politician, belonging to the North Eastern district Tamenglong, Manipur. He was elected to the Manipur Legislative Assembly from Tamenglong constituency in the 1995, 2000, 2002 and 2017 Manipur Legislative Assembly election. Previously, he was a member of Manipur State Congress Party, Federal Party of Manipur and Naga People's Front and Bhartiya Janata Party.
