= Vatsu Meru =

Indian politician

Vatsu Meru is a politician from Nagaland, India. In 2003 he was elected to the Nagaland Legislative Assembly, as the Naga People's Front candidate from the constituency Peren (ST).
