= J. Kumo Sha =

Indian politician

J Kumo Sha

Member of the Manipur Legislative Assembly
- Incumbent
- Assumed office 2022
- Preceded by: D D Thaisii
- Constituency: Karong

Personal details
- Born: 6 March 1982 (age 44)
- Party: Independent
- Parent: D. Jonathan (father)
- Education: B.A.
- Alma mater: University of Delhi
- Profession: Social Worker

J Kumo Sha is an Indian politician from Poumai tribe of Manipur. He was elected from the Karong Assembly constituency in the 2022 Manipur Legislative Assembly election.
