= Imchalemba =

Indian politician

Member of Parliament, Lok Sabha
- In office 21 June 1991 — 4 December 1997
- Preceded by: Shikiho Sema
- Succeeded by: K. Asungba Sangtam
- Constituency: Nagaland

Personal details
- Born: 18 June 1939 Jorhat, Assam, British India
- Party: Indian National Congress
- Other political affiliations: Nagaland People's Council
- Spouse: Bendangmongla
- Children: a daughter and a son
- Parent: Reverend Longri

Imchalemba (born 18 June 1939) is an Indian politician from Nagaland. He was elected as the Member of Parliament, Lok Sabha twice, representing the state in the 10th Lok Sabha and 11th Lok Sabha. He was also the founding editor of the defunct newspaper, Nagaland Times.

== Political Life ==
On 30 April 1970, the Nagaland Nationalist Organisation (NNO) wrote a memorandum to the Central government seeking the integration of contiguous Naga areas of Assam, Manipur, and North-East Frontier Agency into the Nagaland state. Reverend Savino and Imchalemba in their respective capacities of President and General Secretary of the NNO also signed this memorandum. It also demanded that the portfolio of law and order be transferred from the state governor to the state government.

In June 1980, Imchalemba, the incumbent Agriculture Minister in the Nagaland state government, and Tekuyaba from the Naga National Democratic Party tabled a resolution in the state assembly asking for the removal of the incumbent deputy speaker of the house, Rainbow Ezung. Ezung submitted his resignation on 21 June 1980 denying charges of being partisan.

=== Member of Parliament ===
After a brief stint as the minister in the Nagaland state government, Imchalemba filed his nomination for the Nagaland seat in the 1991 Indian general election on the Nagaland People's Council (NPC) ticket. His opponents were the sitting MP, Shikiho Sema from the Indian National Congress (Congress), and Pius Lotha from the Bharatiya Janata Party (BJP). This was the first time that the BJP was contesting the parliamentary election from the state. Both the Congress and NPC criticised the BJP for introducing communal politics in the state. However, Lotha denied that his party was a communal party. The ban on the National Socialist Council of Nagaland on 28 November 1990 became a key issue in the elections. Both Congress and the NPC traded charges against each other as influencing the Vishwanath Pratap Singh's government towards the ban. All parties in Nagaland had registered their protest towards the ban. In addition, the Nagaland state assembly passed a unanimous resolution calling for immediate lifting of the ban. After a delay in announcing the results due to technical reasons, Imchalemba was announced victorious.

In August 1991, non-Congress MPs from Northeast India joined hands to urge the then Prime Minister P. V. Narasimha Rao to initiate steps for an early solution to the pressing economic and political problems in the region, including holding dialogue with the United Liberation Front of Asom. They reiterated that military intervention would not solve the emergence of insurgent groups in the region. Imchalemba joined this move initiated by Jayanta Rongpi.

On 28 July 1992, Imchalemba joined the Congress which the NPC termed as a betrayal. Vizol Koso, the NPC President, said that he was unaware of Imchalemba's plans and was not consulted on the matter.
