= Neiba Ndang =

Indian politician

Member of the Nagaland Legislative Assembly
- In office 1993–2003
- Preceded by: Bangdi Iheilung
- Succeeded by: Vatsu Meru

Personal details
- Born: 1954 (age 71–72)
- Party: Indian National Congress
- Parent: Khriesang (father)
- Profession: Social Worker

Neiba Ndang is a politician from Nagaland, India. He was the Speaker of the Nagaland Legislative Assembly from 1993 to 1998. He was elected to the State Legislature representing Peren Constituency in the 1993 and 1998 Assembly Election.

== Early life ==
He was born to N. K. Zeliang of Peren. He obtained his B.A. from Arts College Kohima. In 1974-75 he was part of the Naga Students' Federation. He was also associated with the Contractors' Union.

== Political life ==
In the 1989 Nagaland Legislative Assembly election he contested unsuccessfully the Peren Assembly constituency as an independent candidate. He then joined the Indian National Congress and contested the 1993 Nagaland Legislative Assembly election as the party candidate. He defeated the sitting MLA Bangdi Lheilung.

He was elected the speaker of the Nagaland Legislative Assembly in 1993 at the age of 39 and completed his term in 1998.

Ndang was the Nationalist Congress Party's Nagaland State president during the 2013 Nagaland Legislative Assembly election. In March 2014 he was elevated as the party's national secretary.
