= Tamenglong Assembly constituency =

Legislative Assembly constituency in Manipur State, India

Coordinates: 24.99°N 93.5°E

Tamenglong
- Constituency for the Manipur Legislative Assembly

Constituency details
- Country: India
- Region: Northeast India
- State: Manipur
- District: Tamenglong
- Lok Sabha constituency: Outer Manipur
- Established: 1967
- Total electors: 35,888
- Reservation: ST

Member of Legislative Assembly
- 12th Manipur Legislative Assembly
- Incumbent Janghemlung Panmei
- Party: NPP
- Alliance: NDA
- Elected year: 2022

Tamenglong is one of the 60 Vidhan Sabha constituencies in the Indian state of Manipur.

It is part of Tamenglong district and is reserved for candidates belonging to the Scheduled Tribes.

== Members of Assembly ==
- 1967: Kakhangai, Independent
- 1972: T. P. Kiulengpou, Independent
- 1974: T. P. Kiulengpou, Manipur Hills Union
- 1980: K. Huriang, Independent
- 1981: J. Panmei, Independent
- 1984: Jangamlung Panmei, Indian National Congress
- 1990: Daisin Pamei, Janata Dal
- 1995: Samuel, Samta Party
- 2000: Samuel Jendai, Manipur State Congress Party
- 2002: Samuel Jendai, Federal Party of Manipur
- 2007: Khangthuanang Panmei, Independent
- 2012: Janghemlung Panmei, Manipur State Congress Party

Year	Member	Party
2017	Samuel Jendai	Bharatiya Janata Party

== Election results ==
Vote share of winning candidates
2022	34.11%
2017	53.44%
2012	41.25%
2007	41.36%
2002	53.91%
2000	44.47%
1995	41.29%
1990	32.95%
1984	44.16%
1980	36.05%
1974	43.20%
1972	35.50%
1967	50.04%

=== 2027 Assembly election ===
2027 Manipur Legislative Assembly election: Tamaenglong
Party	Candidate	Votes	%	±%
INC				
NDA				
NOTA	None of the above			
Majority				
Turnout				
gain from		Swing		

=== Assembly Election 2022 ===
2022 Manipur Legislative Assembly election: Tamenglong
Party	Candidate	Votes	%	±%
NPP	Janghemlung Panmei	10,456	34.11%	
BJP	Huri Golmei	9,147	29.84%	−23.60%
JD(U)	Samuel Jendai	6,447	21.03%	
NPF	Khangthuanang Panmei	4,481	14.62%	−30.60%
Margin of victory		1,309	4.27%	−3.95%
Turnout		30,653	85.41%	9.18%
Registered electors		35,888		12.26%
NPP gain from BJP		Swing	-19.33%	

=== Assembly Election 2017 ===
2017 Manipur Legislative Assembly election: Tamenglong
Party	Candidate	Votes	%	±%
BJP	Samuel Jendai	13,023	53.44%	
NPF	Janghemlung Panmei	11,019	45.21%	24.15%
INC	Janghemlung Panmei	215	0.88%	−36.79%
Margin of victory		2,004	8.22%	4.64%
Turnout		24,371	76.23%	2.12%
Registered electors		31,970		27.36%
BJP gain from MSCP		Swing	12.18%	

=== Assembly Election 2012 ===
2012 Manipur Legislative Assembly election: Tamenglong
Party	Candidate	Votes	%	±%
MSCP	Janghemlung Panmei	7,675	41.25%	
INC	Khangthuanang Panmei	7,009	37.67%	23.31%
NPF	Samuel Jendai	3,918	21.06%	
Margin of victory		666	3.58%	−7.52%
Turnout		18,604	74.10%	−7.07%
Registered electors		25,103		−0.82%
MSCP gain from Independent		Swing	-0.10%	

=== Assembly Election 2007 ===
2007 Manipur Legislative Assembly election: Tamenglong
Party	Candidate	Votes	%	±%
Independent	Khangthuanang Panmei	8,498	41.36%	
Independent	Samuel Jendai	6,217	30.26%	
INC	Janghemlung Panmei	2,952	14.37%	−26.23%
Independent	Digao Pamei	2,818	13.71%	
Margin of victory		2,281	11.10%	−2.21%
Turnout		20,548	81.19%	−6.18%
Registered electors		25,310		22.13%
Independent gain from FPM		Swing	-12.55%	

=== Assembly Election 2002 ===
2002 Manipur Legislative Assembly election: Tamenglong
Party	Candidate	Votes	%	±%
FPM	Samuel Jendai	9,696	53.91%	
INC	Khangthuanang Panmei	7,302	40.60%	31.41%
BJP	Achong Gangmei	987	5.49%	
Margin of victory		2,394	13.31%	−5.54%
Turnout		17,985	87.37%	−0.70%
Registered electors		20,724		3.38%
FPM gain from MSCP		Swing	12.62%	

=== Assembly Election 2000 ===
2000 Manipur Legislative Assembly election: Tamenglong
Party	Candidate	Votes	%	±%
MSCP	Samuel Jendai	7,572	44.47%	
SAP	Khangthuanang Panmei	4,361	25.61%	−15.69%
JD(U)	Achong Gangmei	2,540	14.92%	
INC	Daisin Pamei	1,565	9.19%	−29.02%
NCP	Guiliangliu Panmei	964	5.66%	
Margin of victory		3,211	18.86%	15.78%
Turnout		17,029	85.53%	−2.54%
Registered electors		20,047		11.18%
MSCP gain from SAP		Swing	3.17%	

=== Assembly Election 1995 ===
1995 Manipur Legislative Assembly election: Tamenglong
Party	Candidate	Votes	%	±%
SAP	Samuel Jendai	6,515	41.29%	
INC	Daisin Pamei	6,029	38.21%	13.31%
NPP	Thuankubui Pamei	2,079	13.18%	
MPP	Janghemlung Panmei	839	5.32%	−12.46%
Independent	G. Makuga Rongmei	315	2.00%	
Margin of victory		486	3.08%	−4.97%
Turnout		15,777	88.07%	−0.09%
Registered electors		18,031		3.22%
SAP gain from JD		Swing	8.35%	

=== Assembly Election 1990 ===
1990 Manipur Legislative Assembly election: Tamenglong
Party	Candidate	Votes	%	±%
JD	Daisin Pamei	5,024	32.95%	
INC	G. Phenrong	3,797	24.90%	−19.26%
INS(SCS)	Janghemlung Panmei	3,716	24.37%	
MPP	Ningthan Panmei	2,711	17.78%	15.66%
Margin of victory		1,227	8.05%	−14.89%
Turnout		15,248	88.16%	5.72%
Registered electors		17,469		23.42%
JD gain from INC		Swing	-11.21%	

=== Assembly Election 1984 ===
1984 Manipur Legislative Assembly election: Tamenglong
Party	Candidate	Votes	%	±%
INC	Janghemlung Panmei	5,035	44.16%	
Independent	Ningthan Panmei	2,420	21.23%	
Independent	G. Phenrong	1,770	15.52%	
Independent	Dikambui	1,711	15.01%	
MPP	Z. D. Bonngangmei	242	2.12%	
Independent	T. P. Kiuliangpou	223	1.96%	
Margin of victory		2,615	22.94%	9.09%
Turnout		11,401	82.44%	9.43%
Registered electors		14,154		9.35%
INC gain from Independent		Swing	8.12%	

=== Assembly Election 1980 ===
1980 Manipur Legislative Assembly election: Tamenglong
Party	Candidate	Votes	%	±%
Independent	K. Huriang	3,318	36.05%	
JP	Phenrong	2,043	22.19%	
Independent	T. P. Kiuliangpou	1,196	12.99%	
INC(I)	K. Aching	996	10.82%	
INC(U)	Z. D. Bonngangmei	967	10.51%	
Independent	Achum Kamei	685	7.44%	
Margin of victory		1,275	13.85%	−7.39%
Turnout		9,205	73.01%	−4.25%
Registered electors		12,944		34.40%
Independent gain from Manipur Hills Union		Swing	-7.16%	

=== Assembly Election 1974 ===
1974 Manipur Legislative Assembly election: Tamenglong
Party	Candidate	Votes	%	±%
Manipur Hills Union	T. P. Kiuliangpou	3,152	43.20%	
Independent	Huriang	1,602	21.96%	
Independent	M. Tundou	1,550	21.24%	
Independent	Dijinang	933	12.79%	
Independent	K. L. Samuel	59	0.81%	
Margin of victory		1,550	21.24%	11.97%
Turnout		7,296	77.26%	20.19%
Registered electors		9,631		32.04%
Manipur Hills Union gain from Independent		Swing	7.70%	

=== Assembly Election 1972 ===
1972 Manipur Legislative Assembly election: Tamenglong
Party	Candidate	Votes	%	±%
Independent	T. P. Kiuliangpou	1,435	35.50%	
Independent	Dijingang	1,060	26.22%	
Independent	A. M. Tundou	1,015	25.11%	
INC	M. P. Ningthan	357	8.83%	−23.03%
Independent	K. Houreirung Golmei	175	4.33%	
Margin of victory		375	9.28%	−8.90%
Turnout		4,042	57.07%	48.55%
Registered electors		7,294		−52.16%
Independent hold		Swing	-14.54%	

=== Assembly Election 1967 ===
1967 Manipur Legislative Assembly election: Tamenglong
Party	Candidate	Votes	%	±%
Independent	Kakhangai	622	50.04%	
INC	A. M. Tundas	396	31.86%	
Independent	R. Mathiuhom	165	13.27%	
SSP	Nolendro	40	3.22%	
Independent	Humannang	20	1.61%	
Margin of victory		226	18.18%	
Turnout		1,243	8.52%	
Registered electors		15,246		
Independent win (new seat)				

== See also ==
- Tamenglong district
- Manipur Legislative Assembly
- List of constituencies of Manipur Legislative Assembly
