= W. Wangyuh =

Indian politician

W. Wangyuh Konyak

MP
- Constituency: Nagaland

Personal details
- Born: 20 October 1963 (age 62) Mon District, Nagaland
- Party: NPF
- Spouse: H. Pongthron
- Children: 2 sons and 1 daughter
- As of 16 September, 2006

W. Wangyuh Konyak (born 20 October 1963) was an Indian politician and member of the 14th Lok Sabha of India. He represented the Nagaland constituency and is a member of the Nagaland Peoples Front (NPF) political party.

== Political Life ==
=== Member of Parliament ===
Konyak won the Lok Sabha elections in 2004 with a margin of over 400,000 votes against his closest opponent, K. Asungba Sangtam who represented the Indian National Congress in the previous term. He fought the election on an NPF ticket.

In 2006, he urged the Information and Broadcasting Ministry of the Indian government to ban the screening of the movie The Da Vinci Code in India. He also asked the then Chief Minister of Nagaland, Neiphiu Rio to convene a special session of the state assembly to ban the movie in Nagaland or issue an official notification in this regard.

In 2008, while a Lok Sabha MP from Nagaland, Konyak was expelled from his party, Nagaland People's Front, for six years as he defied party directives and voted for the nuclear deal tabled in Parliament by the United Progressive Alliance. The NPF was in political alliance with the BJP then at the state government.
