= Shikiho Sema =

Indian politician

Member of Parliament, Lok Sabha
- In office 1989-1991
- Preceded by: Chingwang Konyak
- Succeeded by: Imchalemba
- Constituency: Nagaland

Personal details
- Born: 14 April 1946 Old Shena, Zunheboto district, Assam, British India (now in Nagaland, India)
- Died: 4 May 1998 (aged 52)
- Party: Indian National Congress
- Spouse: Hetoli Sema

Shikiho Sema was an Indian politician and parliamentarian. He representing Nagaland in the Lok Sabha the lower house of India's Parliament as a member of the Indian National Congress.
