= Kikhonbou Newmai =

Indian politician

Z Kikhonbou Newmai is an Indian politician and member of the Bharatiya Janata Party. Newmai was elected to Manipur Legislative Assembly from the Tamei constituency as an Indian National Congress candidate in 2012 Manipur Legislative Assembly election.
