= Local government in Nagaland =

Unlike most other states in India, Nagaland (along with Mizoram and Meghalaya), does not fall under the Panchayat Raj System. They are governed under Nagaland Municipal Act. There are 25 urban local bodies in Nagaland- three municipal councils and 21 town councils.

== History ==
In 2001, the Nagaland Municipal Act, 2001 was passed which demarcated the jurisdictions of municipal and town councils. This paved way for the first urban local body election in 2004. In 2006, the Act was amended to incorporate a 33% reservation for women, aligning with the 73rd and 74th constitutional amendments of 1992, which mandated reserving one-third of the total number of seats in rural and urban local bodies for women. However the amendment was opposed by the Naga tribal bodies on the grounds that the reservation for women was in contravention with Naga customary laws. Due to which the next local election supposed to be held in 2009 was deferred by the state government. In 2011, the Naga Mothers’ Association (NMA), an influential women's organization, filed a petition with the Gauhati High Court regarding the matter. That same year, the court directed the Nagaland government to conduct local body elections. However the ruling was overturned by the state government through a resolution rejecting women's reservation in the polls. Subsequently, the Naga Mothers’ Association (NMA) filed a special leave petition in the Supreme Court of India. In 2017, the supreme court directed the state government to conduct the polls. When the state government moved to proceed with the elections as per the court directive, violent protests erupted in the state, resulting in two fatalities. Under mounting pressure, T R Zeliang, who was Chief Minister at the time resigned from his position.

In 2023, Nagaland Municipal Act, 2001 was repealed. and Nagaland Municipal Bill, 2023 was passed which retains 33% Reservation For women.

== Elections ==
=== 2024 Local body election ===
The election happen 20 years after the first local election in Nagaland. The election happened in June with 82% voter turnout.

NDPP won majority all three municipal councils - Kohima, Mokokchung and Dimapur. Of the 21 town councils, NDPP won majority in 15 town councils, NPF won majority in Bhandari and Phek town council, BJP won Niuland town council, Independents won majority in Pfütsero and Chozouba town councils. In Mangkolemba town council, both NDPP and Independents got same number of seats.

Of the total 278 seats, NDPP won a majority of 153 seats, followed by Independents (56), BJP (25), NPF (23), NCP (12), INC (7), NPP (5), JDU (5) and LJP (2).
