= K. Asungba Sangtam =

Indian politician

- Born: 27 July 1945 (age 80); Tsarü, Tuensang District, Nagaland, India
- Occupation(s): Politician; Social worker
- Spouse: Yashila Asung
- Children: Two sons and two daughters
- Parent: Hopongki
- Awards: Padma Shri

K. Asungba Sangtam is an Indian politician, social worker and a former member of Lok Sabha from Nagaland. He was a member of the 12th and 13th Lok Sabha representing the Nagaland Lok Sabha constituency.

== Biography ==
He was born on 27 July 1945 at Tsarü, a village in Tuensang district in the Northeast Indian state of Nagaland. He did his school education at St. Edmund's School, Shillong (1962) and further completed his pre-university at St. Edmund's College, Shillong in 1964. He started his graduate degree from St. Stephen's College, Delhi and completed it in 1970 from the Fazl Ali College, Mokokchung in Nagaland. He was aligned with the Indian National Congress and was a member of the Nagaland Pradesh Congress Committee, served as a joint secretary in 1987 and as a secretary in 1989 but resigned in 2014. During his tenure as a Parliamentarian in the Lok Sabha, he served as a member of the Committee on Communications and as a member of the Consultative Committee of the Ministry of Agriculture. He also unsuccessfully contested the general elections of 2004 and 2009. In 2009, the Government of India awarded him the fourth highest civilian honour of the Padma Shri for his contributions to public affairs.

He has been the president of the Baptist Church Trust Association (BCTA), Delhi since 2005, a partner organisation of the BMS World Mission, He is married to Yashila Asung and has two sons and two daughters.

== See also ==
- Nagaland (Lok Sabha constituency)
