= Rano M. Shaiza =

Indian politician

Member of Parliament, 6th Lok Sabha
- In office 1977–1980
- Preceded by: Kevichüsa Angami
- Succeeded by: Chingwang Konyak

Personal details
- Born: Rano Iralu; 11 November 1928 Phek, Naga Hills District, Assam Province, British India (Now in Nagaland, India)
- Died: 1 April 2015 (aged 86) Kohima, Nagaland, India
- Party: United Democratic Front
- Spouse: Lungshim Shaiza (died 1990)
- Relatives: Sano Vamuzo (sister); Zapu Phizo (maternal uncle)
- Occupation: Politician

Rano Mese Shaiza (née Iralu; 11 November 1928 – 1 April 2015) was an Indian politician and a member of the United Democratic Party. Shaiza was the only woman Member of India's Lower House from the state of Nagaland to date.

== Early life and education ==
Shaiza was born to an Angami Naga family in Phek Town, Nagaland. Her father, Sevilie Iralu, was a doctor by profession. Her mother Vitulie-ü Iralu was the elder sister of the founder of the Naga separatist movement, Angami Zapu Phizo.

Shaiza studied science at Cotton College, Guwahati, and graduated from Saint Mary's College, Shillong.

== Political life ==
Shaiza was a schoolteacher before she joined the Naga separatist movement. She was the first president of the Women's Federation which was part of Naga National Council, and the first women president of the United Democratic Front. In the 1960s, during the early stages of the Naga movement, she was imprisoned for nineteen months.

Shaiza contested her first general election in 1977 and defeated previous chief minister Hokishe Sema of the Indian National Congress, making her the first woman Member of India's Lower House from the state of Nagaland.

Shaiza played an important role in taking the Naga peace accord forward. She brokered the meeting between her uncle Angami Zapu Phizo and the then Indian Prime Minister Morarji Desai. Shaiza was a staunch advocate of prohibition and founded the Naga Mothers' Association that worked towards tackling alcohol abuse in Nagaland, and was instrumental in passing the Nagaland Liquor Total Prohibition Act, 1989 on 29 March 1990.

== Personal life ==
Shaiza married Lungshim Shaiza, with whom she had two daughters and three sons. Lungshim Shaiza was assassinated by the National Socialist Council of Nagaland on 27 January 1990.
