= Tokheho Yepthomi =

Indian politician

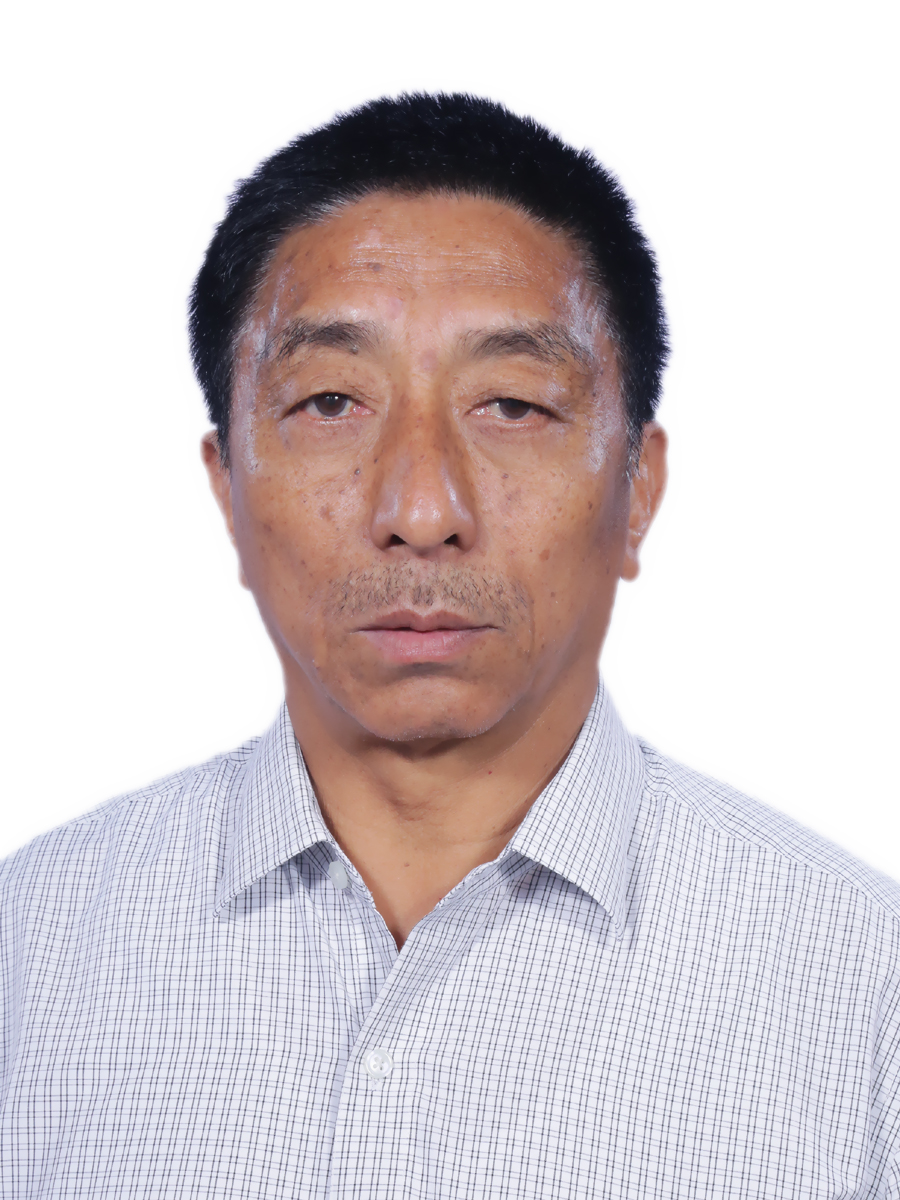

Member of Parliament, Lok Sabha
- In office 31 May 2018 – 4 June 2024
- Preceded by: Neiphiu Rio
- Succeeded by: Supongmeren Jamir
- Constituency: Nagaland

Member of Nagaland Legislative Assembly
- In office 1993–2018

Leader of Opposition Nagaland Legislative Assembly
- In office 2009–2013

Personal details
- Born: 1 April 1956 (age 70) Aghunato, Naga Hills District, Assam, India (Now in Zünheboto District, Nagaland, India)
- Other political affiliations: Nationalist Democratic Progressive Party 2018-2024 Indian National Congress 1993-2018
- Spouse: Ruth Tokheho

Tokheho Yepthomi (born 1 April 1956) is an Indian politician from Nagaland. He served two terms in the Lok Sabha representing Nagaland Lok Sabha constituency. He is also a five-term member of the Nagaland Legislative Assembly and former Cabinet Minister of Nagaland.

== Early life and personal life ==
Tokheho was born and raised in Aghunato, Nagaland. He graduated from St. Edmund's College, Shillong and was an active student leader in his college days. He served as the President of the Eastern Sumi Students Union before entering active politics as a member of the Indian National Youth Congress.

== Political career ==
Tokheho Yepthomi was elected to the Nagaland Legislative Assembly for five terms from 1993 to 2018. He has served as a cabinet minister for Transport and Communication, Public Health Engineering Department and Public Works Department from 1995 to 2008 under former Chief Ministers S C Jamir and Neiphiu Rio.

=== Member of the legislative assembly ===
He served as the Congress Legislature Party Leader and Leader of Opposition in the state assembly from 2010 to 2015..

In 2011, while in opposition, he led a campaign for the dismissal of the then state Education Minister, Nyeiwang Konyak who was allegedly involved in financial irregularities of INR 5,000,000 in the department. He appealed to then Nagaland state governor Nikhil Kumar to accord sanction for prosecution under the Prevention of Corruption Act.

In 2013 Yepthomi was elected from the Dimapur III Assembly constituency with an INC ticket defeating his Azheto Zhimomi of the Naga People's Front (NPF) by a margin of 2031 votes. In 2015, as T. R. Zeliang reshuffled and expanded his cabinet, Yepthomi was sworn as a cabinet minister while still being part of the Indian National Congress to form a government with no opposition in the state legislature. He was allotted the portfolio of Public Health Engineering, School Education and Parliament Affairs in May 2015. He was also given the portfolio of School Education.

=== Term as Nagaland MP ===
After joining the newly formed Nationalist Democratic Progressive Party (NDPP), Yepthomi was selected as the consensus candidate for the People's Democratic Alliance (PDA) to contest by-election to the Nagaland Lok Sabha seat in 2018. The seat was vacated by Neiphiu Rio to become the Chief Minister of Nagaland. He was again selected as the consensus candidate for the PDA in the 2019 General Elections. In the closest election in recent history, Yepthomi won the seat to represent Nagaland in the 17th Lok Sabha Sabha by a margin of 16344 votes.

In May 2020, the Lok Sabha speaker appointed Yepthomi as an associate member of the Delimitation Commission tasked with redrawing parliamentary and assembly constituencies for Jammu and Kashmir, Assam, Manipur, Arunachal Pradesh, and Nagaland. In the 2024 election, Yepthomi did not run for another term.

Lok Sabha
Preceded by Neiphiu Rio	Member of Parliament for Nagaland; 2018 – 2024	Succeeded by S. Supongmeren Jamir
