= Nagaland Lok Sabha constituency =

Parliamentary constituency in India

Nagaland NL-1
- Lok Sabha constituency
- Location of Nagaland in India

Constituency details
- Country: India
- Region: Northeast India
- State: Nagaland
- Assembly constituencies: 60: See List
- Established: 1967
- Total electors: 13,17,536
- Reservation: None

Member of Parliament
- 18th Lok Sabha
- Incumbent S. Supongmeren Jamir
- Party: INC
- Alliance: INDIA
- Elected year: 2024

Nagaland Lok Sabha constituency is the only Lok Sabha (lower house of the Indian parliament) constituency in the Northeastern state of Nagaland.

It participated in its first general election in 1967 and its first member of parliament (MP) was S. C. Jamir of the Nagaland Nationalist Organisation who was elected unopposed. In 1969, the Twenty-third Amendment of the Constitution of India discontinued the reservation of the seat to Scheduled Tribes. In the 1971 election, Kevichüsa Angami of the United Front of Nagaland party defeated Jamir. Rano M. Shaiza of the United Democratic Front was elected in the 1977 election. In the 1980 election, independent candidate, Chingwang was elected. Chingwang joined the Indian National Congress (INC) for the next election in 1984 and held his seat. Shikino Sam of the INC won the 1989 election. From 1991 to 1998, Imchalemba was the MP of this constituency firstly as a member of the Nagaland Peoples Council and then as a member of the INC. From 1998 to 2004, K. Asungba Sangtam of the INC represented this constituency. Since 2004 till 2018, this constituency has been represented by a member of the Nagaland Peoples Front. W. Wangyuh Konyak was the MP from 2004 to 2009. C. M. Chang won the seat in 2009. In 2014 Neiphiu Rio was elected as the MP by a record margin and served till 2018. Between 2018 and 2024 the seat was represented by Nationalist Democratic Progressive Party member Tokheho Yepthomi.

Most Successful parties from Nagaland Lok Sabha
1. INC (6 Times) (33.0%)
2. NPF (3 Times) (20.0%)
3. NDPP ( 2 Times) (13.0%)
4. UFN ( 2 Times) (13.0%)
5. NPC ( 1 Time) (6.00%)
6. NNO (1 Time) (6.00%)
7. Ind ( 1 Time) (6.00%)
8. 0.00%

== Assembly segments ==
Currently, this Lok Sabha constituency consists of all 60 constituencies of the Nagaland Legislative Assembly.

Constituency number	Name	Reserved for (SC/ST/None)	District	MLA	Party
1	Dimapur I	None	Dimapur	H. Tovihoto Ayemi	BJP
2	Dimapur II	ST	Dimapur	Moatoshi Longkümer	NPF
3	Dimapur III	ST	Chümoukedima	Hekani Jakhalu Kense	NPF
4	Ghaspani I	ST	Chümoukedima & Niuland	Jacob Zhimomi	BJP
5	Ghaspani II	ST	Chümoukedima	Zhaleo Rio	NPF
6	Tening	ST	Peren	Namri Nchang	NPF
7	Peren	ST	Peren	T. R. Zeliang	NPF
8	Western Angami	ST	Kohima	Salhoutuonuo Kruse	NPF
9	Kohima Town	ST	Kohima	Tseilhoutuo Rhütso	NPP
10	Northern Angami I	ST	Kohima	Kekhrielhoulie Yhome	NPF
11	Northern Angami II	ST	Kohima	Neiphiu Rio	NPF
12	Tseminyü	ST	Tseminyü	Jwenga Seb	Independent
13	Pughoboto	ST	Zünheboto	Sukhato A. Sema	LJP(RV)
14	Southern Angami I	ST	Kohima	Kevipodi Sophie	Independent
15	Southern Angami II	ST	Kohima	Kropol Vitsü	BJP
16	Pfütsero	ST	Phek	Neisatuo Mero	Independent
17	Chizama	ST	Phek	K. G. Kenye	NPF
18	Chozuba	ST	Phek	Küdecho Khamo	NPF
19	Phek	ST	Phek	Küzholüzo Nienü	NPF
20	Meluri	ST	Phek	Z. Nyusletho Nyuthe	NPF
21	Tuli	ST	Mokokchung	A. Pangjung Jamir	BJP
22	Arkakong	ST	Mokokchung	Nuklutoshi	NPP
23	Impur	ST	Mokokchung	T. M. Mannen	NPF
24	Angetyongpang	ST	Mokokchung	Tongpang Ozüküm	NPF
25	Mongoya	ST	Mokokchung	Imkongmar	NPF
26	Aonglenden	ST	Mokokchung	Sharingain Longkümer	NPF
27	Mokokchung Town	ST	Mokokchung	Metsübo Jamir	NPF
28	Koridang	ST	Mokokchung	Imkong L. Imchen	BJP
29	Jatpetkong	ST	Mokokchung	Temjenmemba	NPF
30	Alongtaki	ST	Mokokchung	Temjen Imna Along	BJP
31	Akuluto	ST	Zünheboto	Kazheto Kinimi	BJP
32	Atoizu	ST	Zünheboto	Picto Shohe	NPF
33	Suruhoto	ST	Zünheboto	S. Tolho Yepth	NPF
34	Aghunato	ST	Zünheboto	G. Ikuto Zhimomi	NPF
35	Zünheboto	ST	Zünheboto	K. Tokugha Sukhalu	NPF
36	Satakha	ST	Zünheboto	G. Kaito Aye	NPF
37	Tyüi	ST	Wokha	Yanthungo Patton	BJP
38	Wokha	ST	Wokha	Y. Mhonbemo Hümtsoe	NPF
39	Sanis	ST	Wokha	Mhathung Yathan	NPF
40	Bhandari	ST	Wokha	Achumbemo Kikon	NPF
41	Tizit	ST	Mon	P. Paiwang Konyak	BJP
42	Wakching	ST	Mon	W. Chingang Konyak	NPF
43	Tapi	ST	Mon	Wangpang Konyang	NPF
44	Phomching	ST	Mon	K. Konngam Konyak	BJP
45	Tehok	ST	Mon	C. L. John	NPF
46	Mon Town	ST	Mon	Y. Mankhao Konyak	NPF
47	Aboi	ST	Mon	C. Manpon Konyak	Independent
48	Moka	ST	Mon	A. Nyamnyei Konyak	NPP
49	Tamlu	ST	Longleng	B. Bangtick Phom	Independent
50	Longleng	ST	Longleng	A. Pongshi Phom	NPF
51	Noksen	ST	Tuensang	Y. Lima Onen	RPI(A)
52	Longkhim Chare	ST	Tuensang	Sethrongkyu	BJP
53	Tuensang Sadar I	ST	Tuensang	P. Bashangmongba Changa	BJP
54	Tuensang Sadar II	ST	Tuensang	Imtichoba	RPI(A)
55	Tobu	ST	Mon	Naiba Konyak	LJP(RV)
56	Noklak	ST	Noklak	P.Longon	NPF
57	Thonoknyu	ST	Noklak	Benei M. Lamthiu	NPP
58	Shamator–Chessore	ST	Shamator	S. Keoshu Yimchunger	NPF
59	Seyochung–Sitimi	ST	Kiphire	C. Kipili Sangtam	NPP
60	Pungro–Kiphire	ST	Kiphire	S. Kiusumew Yimchunger	NPF

== Members of Parliament ==
Election	Member	Party
1967	S. C. Jamir	Nagaland Nationalist Organisation
1971	A. Kevichüsa	United Front of Nagaland
1977	Rano M. Shaiza	United Democratic Front
1980	Chingwang Konyak	Independent
1984	Chingwang Konyak	Indian National Congress
1989	Shikiho Sema	Indian National Congress
1991	Imchalemba	Nagaland People's Council
1996	Imchalemba	Indian National Congress
1998	K. Asungba Sangtam	Indian National Congress
1999	K. Asungba Sangtam	Indian National Congress
2004	W. Wangyuh Konyak	Nagaland People's Front
2009	C. M. Chang	Nagaland People's Front
2014	Neiphiu Rio	Nagaland People's Front
2018 (Note: By-election)	Tokheho Yepthomi	Nationalist Democratic Progressive Party
2019	Tokheho Yepthomi	Nationalist Democratic Progressive Party
2024	S. Supongmeren Jamir	Indian National Congress

== Election results ==
=== 2024 ===
2024 Indian general election: Nagaland
Party	Candidate	Votes	%	±%
INC	S. Supongmeren Jamir	401,951	52.83	
NDPP	Dr. Chumben Murry	350,967	46.13	
IND	Hayithung Tungoe Lotha	6,232	0.82	
NOTA	None of the Above	1,646	0.22	
Majority		50,984	6.70	
Turnout		760,796	57.40	
INC gain from NDPP		Swing		

=== 2019 ===
2019 Indian general election: Nagaland
Party	Candidate	Votes	%	±%
NDPP	Tokheho Yepthomi	500,510	49.73	▼9.17
INC	K. L. Chishi	484,166	48.11	N/A
NPP	Hayithung Tüngoe	14,997	1.49	N/A
Independent	Dr. M M Thromwa Konyak	4,620	0.46	N/A
NOTA	None of the above	2,064	0.21	N/A
Margin of victory		16,344	1.62	▼15.5
Turnout		1,007,437	83.00	▼2.09
Registered electors		1,213,777		
NDPP hold		Swing		

=== 2018 by-election ===
Bye-Election, 2018: Nagaland
Party	Candidate	Votes	%	±%
NDPP	Tokheho Yepthomi	594,205	58.56	New
NPF	C. Apok Jamir	4,20,459	41.44	▼27.23
Margin of victory		1,73,746	17.12	▼21.4
Turnout		10,18,842	85.09	▼2.82
NDPP gain from NPF		Swing		

=== 2014 ===
Neiphiu Rio of the Nagaland Peoples Front represented the constituency in the 16th Lok Sabha.

General Election, 2014: Nagaland
Party	Candidate	Votes	%	±%
NPF	Neiphiu Rio	713,372	68.67	▼1.29
INC	Viswesül Pusa	313,147	30.14	▲0.79
Socialist	Akhei Achümi	9,695	0.93	N/A
NOTA	None of the above	2,696	0.26	N/A
Margin of victory		4,00,225	38.52	▼2.09
Turnout		1,038,910	87.91	▼2.192
NPF hold		Swing	▼1.29	

=== 2009 ===
C. M. Chang of the Nagaland Peoples Front represented the constituency in the 15th Lok Sabha.

General election 2009: Nagaland
Party	Candidate	Votes	%	±%
NPF	C. M. Chang	832,224	69.96	▼3.16
INC	K. Asungba Sangtam	349,203	29.35	▲3.57
AITC	Dr. Rilanthung Odyüo	8,153	0.69	N/A
Margin of victory		483,021	40.61	▲6.73
Turnout		1,189,601	90.01	▼1.76
NPF hold		Swing		

=== 2004 ===
W. Wangyuh Konyak of the Nagaland Peoples Front represented the constituency in the 14th Lok Sabha.

General election 2004: Nagaland
Party	Candidate	Votes	%	±%
NPF	W. Wangyuh Konyak	698,128	73.12	N/A
INC	K. Asungba Sangtam	246,109	25.78	▼45.40
JD(S)	Akhei Achümi	5,149	0.54	N/A
Independent	Nyimthungo	3,687	0.39	N/A
Independent	Dr. Rilanthung	1,646	0.17	N/A
Margin of victory		452,019	47.34	▼1.42
Turnout		954,719	91.77	▲15.52
NPF gain from INC		Swing		

=== 1999 ===
Sangtam of the INC held the seat and represented the constituency in the 13th Lok Sabha.

1999 Indian general election: Nagaland
Party	Candidate	Votes	%	±%
INC	K. Asungba Sangtam	516,119	71.18	▼15.52
Independent	Shürhozelie Liezietsu	162,521	22.42	N/A
BJP	Neikhaho	37,156	5.12	N/A
Lok Shakti	Akhei Achümi	5,763	0.79	▼12.51
Independent	Roland	3,486	0.48	N/A
Margin of victory		353,598	48.76	▼24.64
Turnout		728,843	76.25	▲30.84
INC hold		Swing		

=== 1998 ===
K. Asungba Sangtam of the INC represented the constituency in the 12th Lok Sabha.

1998 Indian general election: Nagaland
Party	Candidate	Votes	%	±%
INC	K. Asungba Sangtam	344,223	86.70	▲24.39
Lok Shakti	Akhei Achümi	52,785	13.30	N/A
Margin of victory		291,438	73.40	▲47.35
Turnout		420,714	45.41	▼42.91
INC hold		Swing		

=== 1996 ===
On 28 July 1992, Imchalemba had joined the Congress. He fought the 1996 elections on the Congress' ticket. The continued presence of the security forces in Nagaland was an important electoral issue. The Naga Students' Federation demanded a boycott of the elections until the "disturbed area" tagged under the Armed Forces (Special Powers) Act was revoked. Congress now had their government in the Centre as well as the state. Imchalemba's opponent, H. Khekiho Zhimomi stated "we certainly don't deserve these black laws in the state and we have the experience of the '50s and '60s which have made this crystal clear. As long as we have these laws operational in the state, violence and tension will continue during elections." Imchalemba won the election comfortably and represented the state in the 11th Lok Sabha.

1996 Indian general election: Nagaland
Party	Candidate	Votes	%	±%
INC	Imchalemba	472,102	62.31	▲17.97
Independent	H. Khekiho Zhimomi	2,74,699	36.26	N/A
Independent	Roland	10,825	1.43	N/A
Margin of victory		1,97,403	26.05	▲17.72
Turnout		772,402	88.32	▲11.25
INC gain from Nagaland Peoples Council				

=== 1991 ===
The election was a direct contest between sitting MP Shikiho Sema from the INC and Imchalemba of the NPC. This was the first election that the BJP fielded a candidate for the Nagaland seat, Pius Lotha, who had to repeatedly reiterate that the BJP was not a communal party. The ban on the National Socialist Council of Nagaland by the Vishwanath Pratap Singh government was the main issue during the election campaigning with the INC and NPC blaming each other for the ban.

1991 Indian general election: Nagaland
Party	Candidate	Votes	%	±%
Nagaland People's Council	Imchalemba	328,015	52.67	▲12.96
INC	Shikiho Sema	276,161	44.34	▼15.95
BJP	Pius Lotha	18,655	3.00	N/A
Margin of victory		51,854	8.33	▼12.25
Turnout		628,015	77.07	▲2.36
Nagaland Peoples Council gain from INC		Swing		

=== 1989 ===
Shikiho Sema of the INC represented the constituency in the 9th Lok Sabha.

1989 Indian general election: Nagaland
Party	Candidate	Votes	%	±%
INC	Shikiho Sema	363,071	60.29	▼4.35
Nagaland People's Council	Vizol Koso	239,124	39.71	N/A
Margin of victory		123,947	20.58	▼14.73
Turnout		607,429	74.71	+8.25
INC hold		Swing		

=== 1984 ===
Chingwang joined the INC, held the seat and represented the constituency in the 8th Lok Sabha.

1984 Indian general election: Nagaland
Party	Candidate	Votes	%	±%
INC	Chingwang Konyak	251,101	64.64	N/A
Naga National Democratic Party	Chalie Kevichüsa	113,919	29.33	N/A
Independent	Huskha	23,444	6.04	N/A
Margin of victory		137,182	35.31	▲33.29
Turnout		394,820	66.46	▲2.56
INC gain from Independent		Swing		

=== 1980 ===
Independent candidate, Chingwang won the election and represented the constituency in the 7th Lok Sabha.

1980 Indian general election: Nagaland
Party	Candidate	Votes	%	±%
Independent	Chingwang Konyak	145,969	51.01	N/A
United Democratic Front	Rano M. Shaiza	140,210	48.99	▼2.69
Margin of victory		5,759	2.02	▼1.34
Turnout		294,009	63.90	▲11.07
Independent gain from UDF				

=== 1977 ===
Rano M. Shaiza of the United Democratic Front party won the seat and represented the constituency in the 6th Lok Sabha.

1977 Indian general election: Nagaland
Party	Candidate	Votes	%	±%
United Democratic Front	Rano M. Shaiza	124,627	51.68	N/A
INC	Hokishe Sema	116,527	48.32	N/A
Margin of victory		8,100	3.36	▼17.58
Turnout		250,016	52.83	▼0.94
UDF gain from UDF				

=== 1971 ===
A. Kevichüsa of the United Front of Nagaland won the election and represented the constituency in the 5th Lok Sabha.

1971 Indian general election: Nagaland
Party	Candidate	Votes	%	±%
UFN (Note: United Front of Nagaland)	A. Kevichusa	89,514	60.47	
NNO	S. C. Jamir	58,511	39.53	
Majority		31,003	20.94	
Turnout		148,125	53.77	
UFN gain from NNO				

=== 1967 ===
In its first election, Nagaland Nationalist Organisation candidate, S. C. Jamir was elected unopposed and represented the constituency in the 4th Lok Sabha.

1967 Indian general election: Nagaland
Party	Candidate	Votes	%	±%
NNO	S. C. Jamir	Unopposed		
Turnout		0	0.00	
NNO win (new seat)				

== See also ==
- List of constituencies of the Lok Sabha
- Local government in Nagaland
