= Chingwang Konyak =

Indian politician

Member of Parliament, Lok Sabha
- In office 1980–1989
- Preceded by: Rano M. Shaiza
- Succeeded by: Shikiho Sema
- Constituency: Nagaland

Personal details
- Born: 24 April 1943 (age 83) Shiyong, Naga Hills District, Assam Province, British India (Now in Mon District, Nagaland, India)

Chingwang Konyak (born 24 April 1943) is an Indian politician from Nagaland. He represented Nagaland constituency in the Indian Parliament. He was earlier served as sole president of Nationalist Democratic Progressive Party from 2018 to 2025, now elected as “President Emeritus” of the Naga People's Front.

== Early life ==
Konyak was born in Shiyong village, Mon District, Nagaland.

== Political career ==
Konyak started his career with Nagaland Nationalist Organisation but joined Indian National Congress in June 1976. He was Minister of State, Nagaland for Veterinary, Animal Husbandry and Jails, from 1969 to 1971. He was promoted as Cabinet Minister for Tuensang Affairs, Excise and Relief and Rehabilitation, from 1971 to 1974.

In 1969, he held the portfolio of the state Minister for Animal Husbandry and Veterinary in Hokishe Sema's cabinet. Subsequently, he was the Minister for Tuensang Affairs in the state cabinet.

=== Member of Parliament ===
In 1979, while holding the Vice President position of the Nagaland Congress Committee, Konyak resigned from the Indian National Congress. The following day, he was nominated as the consensus candidate of the opposition to stand for the upcoming Lok Sabha elections. His opponent was the sitting Lok Sabha MP, Rano M. Shaiza from the United Democratic Front. Votes for the election were cast on 3 January 1980. Konyak reportedly had strong influence in Dimapur town, as well as the districts of Mon, Tuensang, and Zunheboto.

On 8 September 1981, he demanded a commission of enquiry to be set up through the Lok Sabha to probe into the North-Eastern Hill University. He pointed out that the request was already put forth by the executive council of the university. He wanted the commission to look into allegations of misadministration, corruption, nepotism, student rivalries, and communal tension.

He held the Nagaland Lok Sabha seat in the 1984 General Elections on an Indian National Congress ticket. During a parliamentary debate on the Food Corporation of India, Konyak alleged that 50 per cent of the rice allocated to Nagaland through public distribution system did not reach the state population. It was diverted to other places from Dimapur.

In December 1987, he resigned from the seat subsequent to his elections to the Nagaland state assembly and induction into the Hokishe Sema cabinet.
