= S. Supongmeren Jamir =

Indian politician

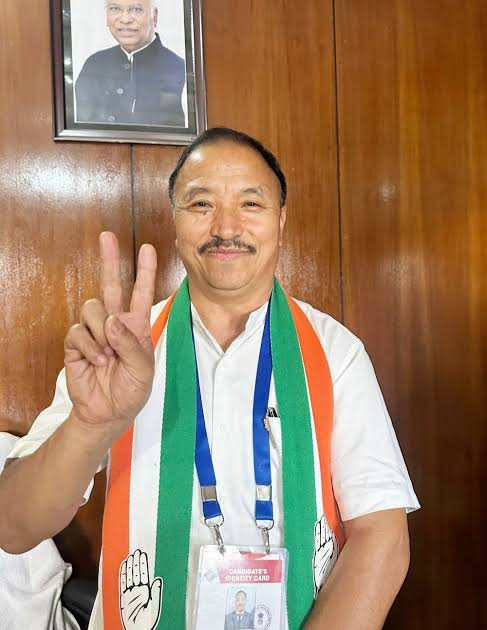

Member of Parliament, Lok Sabha
- Incumbent
- Assumed office 4 June 2024
- Preceded by: Tokheho Yepthomi
- Constituency: Nagaland

President Nagaland Pradesh Congress Committee
- Incumbent
- Assumed office 31 March 2023
- Preceded by: Kewekhape Therie

Member of the Nagaland Legislative Assembly
- In office 2003–2008
- Preceded by: T. Imtimeren Jamir
- Succeeded by: Ngangshi K. Ao
- Constituency: Mongoya

Personal details
- Born: 25 March 1963 (age 63) Longsa, Nagaland, India
- Party: Indian National Congress
- Profession: Politician

S. Supongmeren Jamir is an Indian politician from Nagaland belonging to the Indian National Congress. He is the current Lok Sabha MP from Nagaland and also serves as the president of the Nagaland Pradesh Congress Committee. He had earlier been a member of the Nagaland Legislative Assembly.
