= 2013 Nagaland Legislative Assembly election =

Indian state election

- 23 February 2013

All 60 to the Nagaland Legislative Assembly 31 seats needed for a majority
- Turnout: 91.62%
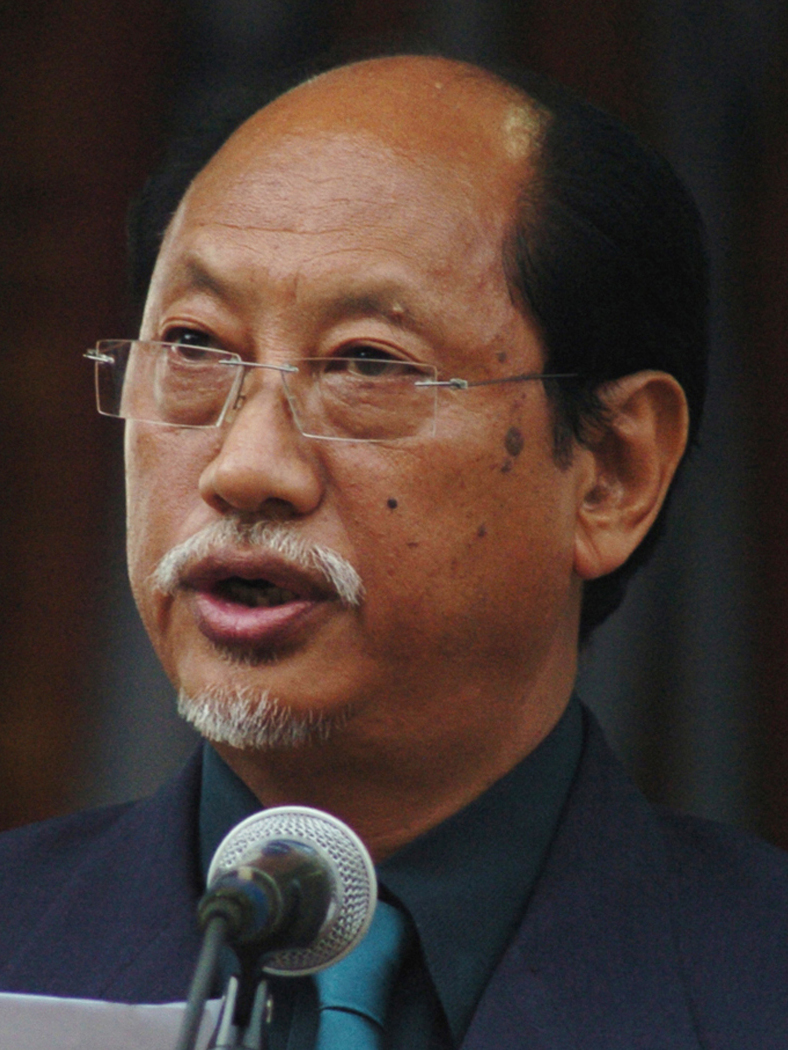

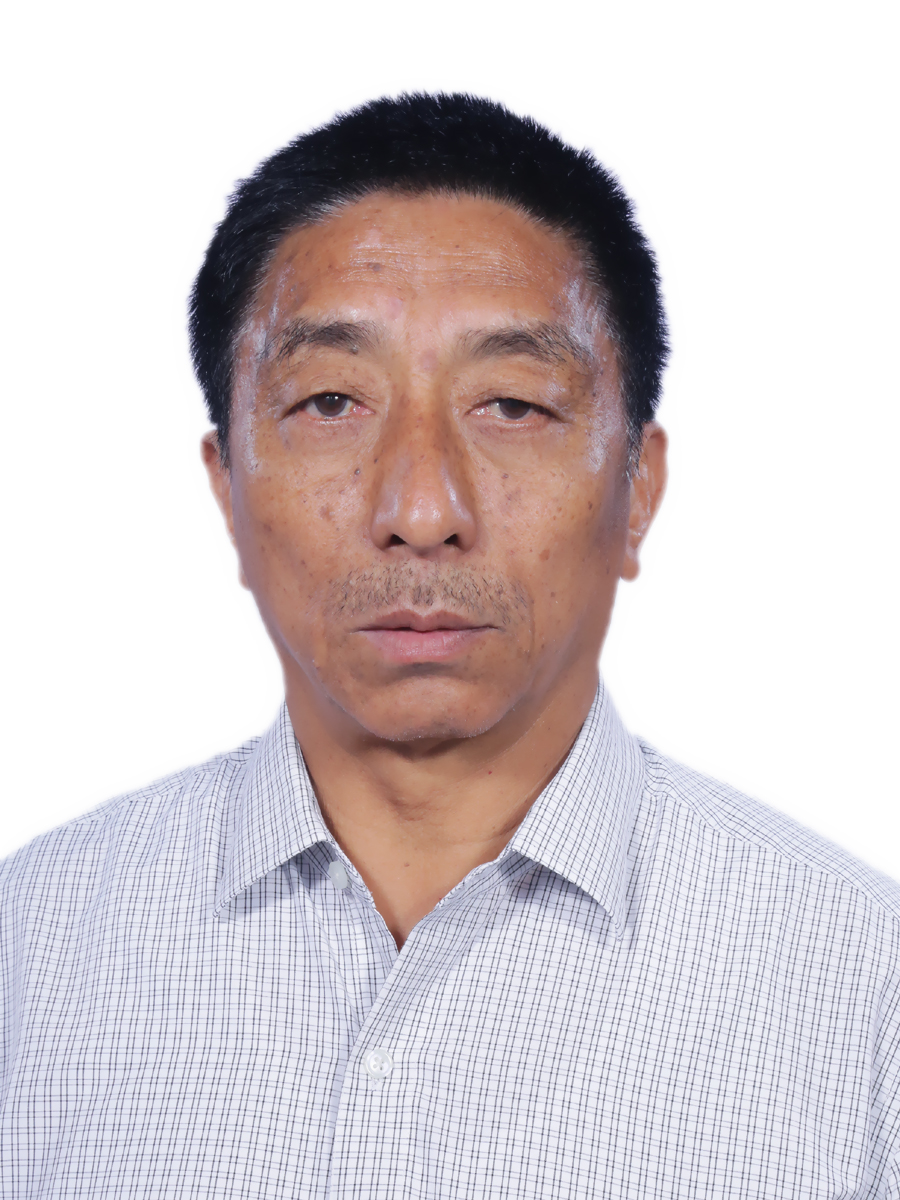
	First party	Second party
Leader	Neiphiu Rio	Tokheho Yepthomi
Party	NPF	INC
Alliance	NDA	UPA
Leader's seat	Northern Angami-II	Dimapur - III
Last election	26	23
Seats won	38	8
Seat change	▲12	▼15
Popular vote	515,059	272,515
Percentage	47.0%	24.9%
- Seatwise result map of the election

- Structure of the Nagaland Legislative Assembly after the election
Chief Minister before election
Neiphiu Rio
NPF
Chief Minister after election
Neiphiu Rio
NPF

An election was held on 23 February 2013 to elect the Members of the Legislative Assembly (MLA) from each of the 60 Assembly Constituencies (ACs) in the state of Nagaland in India.

== Background ==
The mandate of the 11th Nagaland Legislative Assembly, formed after the 2008 election, expired on 10 March 2013. Hence, the elections to the 12th Nagaland Legislative Assembly was announced by the Election Commission of India on 11 January 2013. Consequently, the Model Code of Conduct came into force from that day in the state until the elections were concluded. 59 of the total 60 seats in the assembly are reserved for Scheduled Tribes (ST) candidates.

== Parties contested ==
The incumbent NPF fielded candidates in all 60 seats. The Nationalist Congress Party (NCP) contested the elections with the intention to create a third front amidst the historical tussle between a national and regional party in the state elections. NCP president Neiba Ndang pitched the party as a 'national party with a regional mindset' against the 'shoddy development activities' of the incumbent Rio government. BJP fought the elections in 11 seats.

Party	Flag	Symbol	Leader	Seats contested
Naga People's Front			Neiphiu Rio	60
Indian National Congress			S. I. Jamir	56
Nationalist Congress Party			Neiba Ndang	15
Bharatiya Janata Party			Nitin Gadkari	11
Janata Dal (United)			Nitish Kumar	3
Rashtriya Janata Dal			Lalu Prasad Yadav	2
United Naga Democratic Party				1

=== Electoral promises ===
The BJP acknowledged the “unique background and separate entity of the Eastern Naga peoples.” BJP national president, Nitin Gadkari assured a separate state for Frontier Nagaland if the party comes to power at the national level after the 2014 Indian general election.

== Candidates ==
The last date to withdraw candidature was 9 February 2013, two weeks before the polling. After the scrutiny of the nomination papers put up by the candidates, 187 candidates in total were able to contest for a total of 60 seats. T. A. Ngullie, on a BJP ticket, was the oldest candidate at the age of 80, while Wanglem Konyak, an independent candidate was the youngest at 29. K. L. Chishi of the INC was one of the richest legislators in the state with assets worth ₹510,000,000 (51 crore).

Two women candidates stood for elections, Dr. Yangerla for Mokokchung Town constituency as an independent candidate and Rhakila for Tuensang Sadar II constituency as a BJP candidate. The former was previously the director of the state's Department of Health and Family Welfare. The latter was the widow of the Lakiumong, a former minister and MLA from the same constituency. The NPF as well as INC did not field any woman candidate for the election. In the 2008 Nagaland election, there were four women candidates.

INC candidate and sitting MLA from Tuensang Sadar I, P. Chuba Chang, died on 22 February 2013 amidst his election campaign. Therefore, the polls were adjourned in the constituency to 23 March 2013, providing INC time until 6 March 2013 to file nomination of a new candidate. The party failed to field another candidate.

=== Violations ===
Election officials seized ₹10,000,000 (1 crore) from sitting MLA of Tamlu constituency, and NPF candidate, H. Nyemli Phom, as his chartered helicopter landed without prior permission at the Assam Rifles helipad in Longleng district. Phom claimed that the money belonged to NPF party funds and was given to him for party expenses across the state. He provided an authorised letter from the party treasurer. The election officers filed an FIR in this connection. Election officials, assisted by Assam Rifles, also found outgoing Nagaland Home Minister, Imkong L. Imchen, with more than ₹11,000,000 (1.1 crore) and weapons from his vehicle at Sathupang in Wokha district on route to his Koridang constituency. Imchen was detained by the officials. Imchen issued a statement asserting that he had committed "no wrong over the incident under the law." The Nagaland Pradesh Congress Committee sought his disqualification from contesting viewing the haul as a violation of the Model Code of Conduct and Arms Act, 1959. Overall, in a survey conducted by YouthNet in collaboration with Association for Democratic Reforms, they found candidates had spent over ₹937 crore in pursuit of being elected to the assembly in 2013. This was almost double the spent in 2008 elections. YouthNet director, Hekani Jakhalu noted that the report was aimed to, "to educate the masses to shift from the vicious circle which would bring checks and balances in the system for overall development of Nagaland."

== Voting ==
=== Electorate ===
It was the first time elections in the state were conducted with photo electoral rolls. The rolls were published on 10th January 2013 a day prior to the announcement of the elections. The total number of registered voters by the last day to file nominations was 11,98,449.

Total electors
	General Electors			Service Electors			Total Electors		
Districts	Male	Female	Total	Male	Female	Total	Male	Female	Total
Dimapur	93690	88547	182237	878	138	1016	94568	88685	183253
Peren	28322	28707	57029	83	5	88	28405	28712	57117
Kohima	66958	70550	137508	263	37	300	67221	70587	137808
Pughoboto	6325	6472	12797	56	9	65	6381	6481	12862
Phek	52714	54052	106766	253	9	262	52967	54061	107808
Mokokchung	68197	65981	134178	1078	145	1223	69275	66126	135401
Zunheboto	46266	46561	92827	468	117	585	46734	46678	93412
Wokha	51187	50867	102054	748	29	777	51935	50896	102831
Mon	79900	73783	153683	297	65	362	80197	73848	154045
Longleng	19679	17631	37310	11	0	11	19690	17631	37321
Tuensang	64040	61011	125051	276	42	318	64316	61053	125369
Kiphire	26553	25391	51944	57	1	58	26610	25392	52002
State Total	603831	589553	1193384	4468	597	5065	608299	590150	1198449

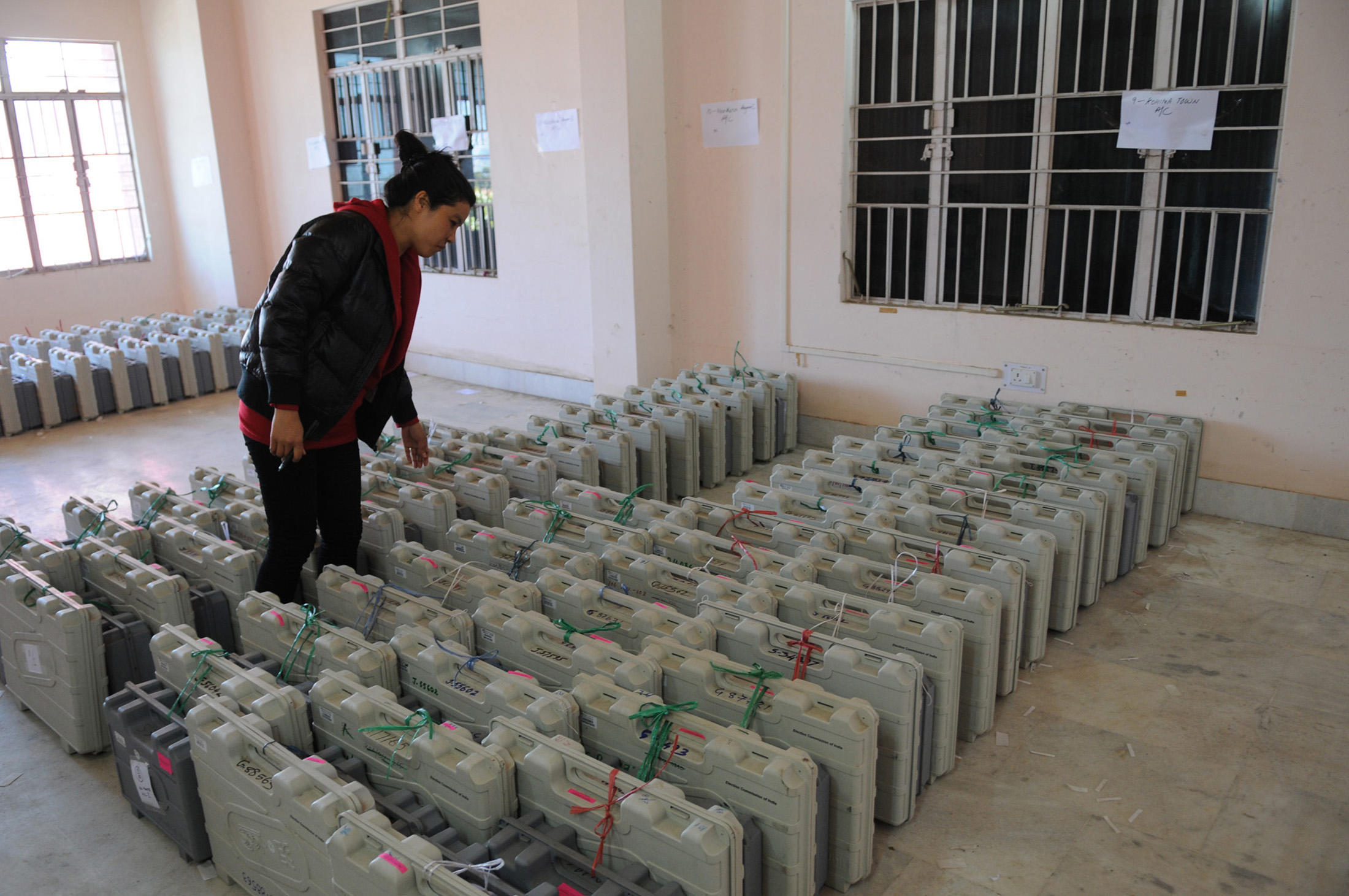
A poll officer checking the Electronic Voting Machines (EVMs) before elections in Kohima.

The total votes polled was 10,80,887, which was 90.57% of the total voters in the state. The male and female voting stood was 89.09% and 91.33% respectively. The election was conducted with 12 returning officers and 84 assistant returning officers. The former are usually the respective districts' Deputy Commissioner in Nagaland. 2024 polling stations were created, an increase of 234 from the 2009 Indian general election in the state. Of these, 1904 were main polling station and 120 designated as auxiliary polling station. At 280, Dimapur District had the highest number of polling stations. The election was conducted entirely through 2064 Electronic Voting Machines (EVMs). Of these 40 were replaced due to defects, and three were damaged on the polling day and re-poll were ordered.

=== Security ===
Before the polls, 821 polling stations were identified as sensitive while 662 were deemed as hyper-sensitive. Therefore, 230 companies of Central Armed Police Forces (CAPF) and Nagaland Armed Police were deployed for the elections. This was an increase from 180 companies for the 2008 assembly election. 191 of these arrived in the state after being deployed for the 2013 Tripura elections and its conclusion. Besides the CAPF, the state would also deployed approximately 13,000 personnels from Nagaland Police, village guards, and home guards. In total, 24785 security personnel were deployed to monitor the elections. Special orders were issued that prohibited carrying arms and other weapons. The district police force provided details mapping the polling stations vulnerable to poll-related violence. Deputy Election Commissioner of India, Sudhir Tripathi, was also present in the state as an observer.

On 7 February, three people were injured when supporters of different parties clashed at Molungkimong village under Alongtaki constituency. Personnels from the Police and Indian Reserve Battalion took control of the situation, and later, found several arms and ammunitions in one of the house. On 8 February, election-related violence was witnessed in Mokokchung village, under Mongoya constituency, between people affiliated to different political parties. Eight people were arrested after some vehicles were damaged and a house ransacked. Police found huge quantity of alcohol at the house previously ransacked. On the same day, police also dismantled a check post erected near Longsima village to stop vehicles and frisk people.

Despite the heavy security arrangements, on 20 February, three days before the elections, a bomb blast occurred near Dimapur railway station which killed one person. Security forces then cordoned off the area.

=== Repoll ===
Consequently, nine EVMs were used for re-polls in nine polling stations. Firstly, to cover EVMs that were three damaged on the polling day due to violence: Toshiho in Ghaspani II constituency and Hoshepu A & B station in Aghunato constituency. At the latter, armed supporters of two candidates had clashed resulting in violence. Secondly, fresh polls were also ordered for the two polling stations in Yangkhao village in Tobu constituency and Alisopur village in Longkhim–Chare constituency as the number of votes polled were more than the total electorate of these villages. Finally, as the Assam Armed Police (AAP) obstructed polling in Ladaigarh of the Tamlu constituency re-poll was necessitated. Assam considers the area disputed. Longleng's Deputy Commissioner, K. Libanthung Lotha, had rushed to the area to intervene but it could not conducted on 23 February.

== Results ==
NPF won 38 seats which was a clear mandate returning Rio to power. It won six of the seven seats in Kohima district. It was the worst performance by INC in the state as it was reduced to single digit for the first time. It also failed to win a single seat in eight districts. In Tuensang district, it lost all three seats it won in 2008. Former Chief Minister S. C. Jamir attributed the INC poor performance to 'money power' employed by NPF. NCP increased its tally from two to four seats this election. Eight independents also won.

The two women candidates who stood for elections, Dr. Yangerla and Rhakila lost the elections. As an independent candidate, the former forfeited her deposited as she polled merely 579 votes for the Mokokchung Town seat, and the latter came third with 4193 votes for the Tuensang Sadar II seat. Thereby, Nagaland once again failed to elect any woman to its state assembly.

Parties and coalitions	Popular vote			Seats	
Parties and coalitions	Votes	%	±pp	Won	+/−
Nagaland People's Front (NPF)	515,059	47.0	▲13.4	38	▲12
Indian National Congress (INC)	272,515	24.9	▼11.4	8	▼15
Independents (IND)	194,314	17.8	▲4.7	8	▲1
Nationalist Congress Party (NCP)	66,277	6.1	▲2.0	4	▲2
Bharatiya Janata Party (BJP)	19,121	1.8	▼3.6	1	▼1
Janata Dal (United) (JD(U))	18,049	1.7	▲1.4	1	▲1
Rashtriya Janata Dal (RJD)	5,446	0.5	▼6.1	0	Steady
United Naga Democratic Party (UNDP)	4,071	0.4	▲0.2	0	Steady
Total	1,094,852	100.00		60	±0

=== Results by constituency ===
The incumbent Chief Minister Neiphiu Rio won the Northern Angami II seat with the highest margin of votes with 12671 more votes than his nearest rival. INC candidate Chubatoshi Apok Jamir retained the Mokokchung Town seat with a small margin of 47 votes. Rio also retained his seat polling the highest percentage of votes at 85.32% while NCP candidate Sajukha Rengma gained only 0.09% of votes in Tseminyü. Rengma along with 46 other candidates forfeited their security deposit. Sitting MLA, Kejong Chang of the NPF was the oldest candidate elected at the age of 77, while Merentoshi R. Jamir, also an NPF candidate, was the youngest at the age of 32 in the new assembly.

Forty percent of elected candidates were first-timers.

Winner, runner-up, voter turnout, and victory margin in every constituency
Assembly Constituency		Turnout	Winner				Runner Up				Margin
#k	Names	%	Candidate	Party	Votes	%	Candidate	Party	Votes	%	Margin
1	Dimapur I	81.48	Tovihoto Ayemi	NPF	6,952	42.93	K. L. Chishi	INC	5,114	31.58	1,838
2	Dimapur II	80.26	S. I. Jamir	INC	14,151	37.90	Savi Liegise	IND	12,536	33.58	1,615
3	Dimapur III	86.75	Tokheho Yepthomi	INC	12,809	53.22	Azheto Zhimomi	NPF	10,778	44.78	2,031
4	Ghaspani I	87.77	Jacob Zhimomi	IND	26,287	51.00	H. Khekiho Zhimomi	NPF	25,255	49.00	1,032
5	Ghaspani II	89.44	Zhaleo Rio	NPF	11,189	41.17	Y. Hewoto Awomi	INC	8,801	32.38	2,388
6	Tening	94.17	Namri Nchang	NPF	9,151	33.48	Tarie Zeliang	INC	8,003	29.28	1,148
7	Peren	89.83	T. R. Zeliang	NPF	13,627	54.00	Iherie Ndang	INC	10,991	43.56	2,636
8	Western Angami	82.99	Kiyanilie Peseyie	NPF	5,969	44.17	Asu Keyho	INC	4,969	36.77	1,000
9	Kohima Town	81.20	Neikiesalie Nicky Kire	NPF	15,506	63.66	Vikuotuolie Angami	IND	8,795	36.11	6,711
10	Northern Angami I	87.15	Khriehu Liezietsu	NPF	8,232	57.48	Prasielie Pienyu	INC	6,072	42.40	2,160
11	Northern Angami II	94.00	Neiphiu Rio	NPF	15,305	85.30	Kevise Sogotsu	INC	2,634	14.68	12,671
12	Tseminyü	95.98	Levi Rengma	IND	9,212	37.59	R. Khing	NPF	8,444	34.46	768
13	Pughoboto	94.72	Y. Vikheho Swu	NPF	7,208	59.16	Joshua Achumi	INC	4,922	40.40	2,286
14	Southern Angami I	92.24	Vikho-o Yhoshü	NPF	8,413	68.07	Nagakul Tase	INC	3,921	31.72	4,492
15	Southern Angami II	92.57	Kropol Vitsu	NPF	10,626	67.21	Viswesül Pusa	INC	5,175	32.73	5,451
16	Pfütsero	93.88	Neiba Kronu	NPF	6,636	32.21	Kewekhape Therie	INC	5,949	28.88	687
17	Chizami	94.64	Deo Nukhu	NPF	5,695	34.37	Kevechutso Doulo	IND	5,253	31.70	442
18	Chozuba	94.75	Chotisuh Sazo	NPF	14,104	57.85	Vaprumu Demo	INC	7,703	31.59	6,401
19	Phek	90.82	Küzholuzo Nienü	NPF	11,447	56.55	Vekho Swuro	IND	7,559	37.34	3,888
20	Meluri	95.29	Yitachu	NPF	12,030	64.57	Khuosatho	INC	6,479	34.78	5,551
21	Tuli	91.84	Amenba Yaden	IND	7,408	45.36	L. Temjen Jamir	NPF	4,659	28.53	2,749
22	Arkakong	94.15	Nuklutoshi	NPF	8,544	54.61	Takatiba Masa Ao	INC	7,094	45.34	1,450
23	Impur	95.94	Imtiwapang Aier	INC	6,122	62.94	T. N. Mannen	NPF	3,597	36.98	2,525
24	Angetyongpang	91.90	S. Chuba Longkumer	IND	5,480	40.13	Sashimar	NPF	5,068	37.11	412
25	Mongoya	87.52	Merentoshi R. Jamir	NPF	8,808	67.89	Ngangshi K. Ao	INC	4,125	31.79	4,683
26	Aonglenden	85.84	Imtikümzük Longkümer	INC	5,604	54.64	Toshipokba	NPF	4,633	45.17	971
27	Mokokchung Town	86.15	Chubatoshi Apok Jamir	INC	2,229	44.50	Rosemtong	NPF	2,182	43.56	47
28	Koridang	96.40	Imkong L. Imchen	NPF	11,869	65.34	T. Chalukumba Ao	IND	6,134	33.77	5,735
29	Jangpetkong	88.85	Longrineken	NPF	3,117	32.64	E. T. Sunup	IND	2,961	31.00	156
30	Alongtaki	92.98	Benjongliba Aier	NPF	7,087	55.13	Moatoshi Longkumer	IND	5,596	43.53	1,491
31	Akuluto	94.74	Khekaho	INC	6,070	59.73	Kazheto Kinimi	NPF	4,087	40.22	1,983
32	Atoizu	96.17	Picto Shohe	IND	8,965	57.99	Doshehe Y. Sema	NPF	5,681	36.75	3,284
33	Suruhoto	95.02	Shetoyi	NPF	6,952	51.30	Kiyezhe Aye	INC	6,547	48.31	405
34	Aghunato	88.34	Pukhayi	NPF	6,902	52.87	Hukiye N. Tissica	INC	6,141	47.04	761
35	Zünheboto	87.71	S. Hukavi Zhimomi	INC	6,827	36.13	K. C. Nihoshe	NPF	6,550	34.66	277
36	Satakha	91.01	G. Kaito Aye	NPF	10,873	74.55	Vitoho Zhimomi	INC	3,705	25.40	7,168
37	Tyüi	95.33	Yanthungo Patton	NPF	11,525	56.99	Yankithung Yanthan	INC	5,985	29.60	5,540
38	Wokha	94.04	T. M. Lotha	NCP	16,401	50.88	Chumben Murry	NPF	14,919	46.28	1,482
39	Sanis	97.79	N. Thomas Lotha	IND	6,983	32.15	Nkhao Lotha	RJD	5,413	24.92	1,570
40	Bhandari	97.91	Mmhonlümo Kikon	NCP	8,183	33.26	Achumbemo Kikon	IND	7,929	32.23	254
41	Tizit	91.97	P. Paiwang Konyak	BJP	7,967	46.92	Aloh	NPF	4,991	29.40	2,976
42	Wakching	95.33	Y. M. Yollow Konyak	IND	10,063	54.95	M. C. Konyak	NPF	8,248	45.04	1,815
43	Tapi	88.29	Noke Wangnao	NPF	6,998	53.75	Lanpha Konyak	INC	4,319	33.17	2,679
44	Phomching	96.96	Pohwang Konyak	NPF	10,499	55.81	K. Konngam Konyak	INC	8,062	42.85	2,437
45	Tehok	91.43	C. L. John	NPF	10,917	77.27	W. Wongyuh Konyak	INC	3,026	21.42	7,891
46	Mon Town	92.45	N. Thongwang Konyak	NPF	6,870	37.29	Y. Mankhao Konyak	INC	6,596	35.81	274
47	Aboi	94.34	E. Eshak Konyak	INC	4,599	43.32	Nyeiwang Konyak	NPF	3,906	36.79	693
48	Moka	96.57	E. E. Pangteang	NPF	10,649	64.56	Longang	INC	5,824	35.31	4,825
49	Tamlu	98.22	B. S. Nganlang Phom	JD(U)	7,276	51.23	Nyemli Phom	NPF	5,398	38.01	1,878
50	Longleng	97.15	S. Pangnyu Phom	NPF	13,171	59.30	T. L. Semdok	NCP	8,936	40.24	4,235
51	Noksen	94.53	C. M. Chang	NPF	5,602	49.02	Y. Lima Onen Chang	NCP	4,510	39.47	1,092
52	Longkhim Chare	98.60	A. Imtilemba Sangtam	NCP	7,273	36.28	Thrinimong Sangtam	INC	5,814	29.00	1,459
53	Tuensang Sadar I	76.09	Toyang Changkong Chang	IND	9,534	56.74	L. Elam Chang	NPF	7,262	43.22	2,272
54	Tuensang Sadar II	91.59	Kejong Chang	NPF	5,268	29.49	I. N. Mongba	INC	4,699	26.30	569
55	Tobu	97.22	Naiba Konyak	NPF	10,118	56.21	Bongkhao	INC	7,881	43.79	2,237
56	Noklak	97.84	Puthai Longon	NPF	9,168	60.74	H. Haiying	INC	5,863	38.84	3,305
57	Thonoknyu	97.47	L. Khumo Khiamniungan	NCP	7,963	44.62	S. Heno Khiamniungan	NPF	6,656	37.29	1,307
58	Shamator–Chessore	86.87	R. Tohanba	NPF	6,602	43.12	K. Yimso Yimchunger	JD(U)	3,688	24.09	2,914
59	Seyochung–Sitimi	97.96	C. Kipili Sangtam	NPF	12,507	57.63	Tsasepi Sangtam	INC	9,108	41.97	3,399
60	Pungro–Kiphire	92.98	T. Torechu	NPF	15,894	57.27	R. Tsapikiu Sangtam	INC	11,349	40.89	4,545

== See also ==
- Liezietsu ministry

== Bibliography ==
- Alam, J. (2013). Report on the General Election to the 12th Nagaland Legislative Assembly, 2013 (PDF). Kohima: Chief Electoral Officer, Nagaland. Archived from the original (PDF) on 25 November 2022.
- TNN (11 February 2013). "Unprecedented security ring for Nagaland election". The Times of India. Archived from the original on 15 October 2013.
