= Ghaspani II Assembly constituency =

Legislative Assembly constituency in Nagaland State, India

Coordinates: 25.68°N 94.11°E

Ghaspani II
- Constituency No. 5 for the Nagaland Legislative Assembly

Constituency details
- Country: India
- Region: Northeast India
- State: Nagaland
- District: Chümoukedima
- Lok Sabha constituency: Nagaland
- Established: 1974
- Total electors: 29,435
- Reservation: ST

Member of Legislative Assembly
- 14th Nagaland Legislative Assembly
- Incumbent Zhaleo Rio
- Party: Naga People's Front

Ghaspani II is one of the 60 Legislative Assembly constituencies of Nagaland state in India.

Previously part of Dimapur district, it is now part of Chümoukedima district and is reserved for candidates belonging to the Scheduled Tribes.

== Members of the Legislative Assembly ==
Year	Member	Party
2008	Kihoto Hollohon	Independent
2013	Zhaleo Rio	Naga People's Front
2018	Zhaleo Rio	Nationalist Democratic Progressive Party
2023	Zhaleo Rio	Nationalist Democratic Progressive Party

== Election results ==
Vote share of winning candidates
2023	46.48%
2018	47.79%
2013	41.17%
2008	35.63%
2003	30.21%
1993	52.15%
1989	58.33%
1987	26.26%
1982	39.63%
1977	30.92%
1974	37.79%

=== Assembly Election 2023 ===
2023 Nagaland Legislative Assembly election: Ghaspani II
Party	Candidate	Votes	%	±%
NDPP	Zhaleo Rio	11,405	46.48%	−1.31%
RPI(A)	Z. Kasheto Yeptho	7,230	29.46%	
LJP(RV)	Kitoho S. Rotokha	5,793	23.61%	
NOTA	Nota	111	0.45%	
Margin of victory		4,175	17.01%	−4.46%
Turnout		24,539	83.37%	−3.16%
Registered electors		29,435		11.26%
NDPP hold		Swing	-1.31%	

=== Assembly Election 2018 ===
2018 Nagaland Legislative Assembly election: Ghaspani II
Party	Candidate	Votes	%	±%
NDPP	Zhaleo Rio	10,939	47.79%	
NPF	Dr. Kevingulie Khro	6,023	26.31%	−14.85%
INC	K. K. Sema	5,653	24.70%	−7.68%
NOTA	None of the Above	275	1.20%	
Margin of victory		4,916	21.48%	12.69%
Turnout		22,890	86.52%	−2.92%
Registered electors		26,455		−12.94%
NDPP gain from NPF		Swing	6.62%	

=== Assembly Election 2013 ===
2013 Nagaland Legislative Assembly election: Ghaspani II
Party	Candidate	Votes	%	±%
NPF	Zhaleo Rio	11,189	41.17%	12.62%
INC	Y. Hewoto Awomi	8,801	32.38%	17.64%
Independent	Rokonicha	4,921	18.11%	
Independent	Khaiminlun	2,266	8.34%	
Margin of victory		2,388	8.79%	1.71%
Turnout		27,180	89.44%	5.84%
Registered electors		30,388		8.90%
NPF gain from Independent		Swing	5.54%	

=== Assembly Election 2008 ===
2008 Nagaland Legislative Assembly election: Ghaspani II
Party	Candidate	Votes	%	±%
Independent	Kihoto Hollohon	8,312	35.63%	
NPF	Rokonicha	6,661	28.55%	9.67%
RJD	Kikheho Sema	4,931	21.14%	
INC	Miathou	3,439	14.74%	−15.47%
Margin of victory		1,651	7.08%	5.33%
Turnout		23,330	83.65%	−4.51%
Registered electors		27,905		17.21%
Independent gain from INC		Swing	5.42%	

=== Assembly Election 2003 ===
2003 Nagaland Legislative Assembly election: Ghaspani II
Party	Candidate	Votes	%	±%
INC	Rokonicha	6,337	30.21%	
NDM	Dr. Kakheto Zhimomi	5,970	28.46%	
JD(U)	Ghosuho Zhimomi	4,225	20.14%	
NPF	Mezhulie	3,961	18.88%	
Independent	Akheli	486	2.32%	
Margin of victory		367	1.75%	
Turnout		20,979	88.12%	−7.47%
Registered electors		23,808		4.55%
INC hold		Swing	-21.95%	

=== Assembly Election 1998 ===
1998 Nagaland Legislative Assembly election: Ghaspani II
Party	Candidate	Votes	%	±%
INC	Rokonicha	Unopposed		
Registered electors		22,771		8.20%
INC hold		Swing		

=== Assembly Election 1993 ===
1993 Nagaland Legislative Assembly election: Ghaspani II
Party	Candidate	Votes	%	±%
INC	Kakheto	10,407	52.15%	−6.17%
NPF	Rokonicha	9,291	46.56%	4.88%
BJP	Asat Doungel	257	1.29%	
Margin of victory		1,116	5.59%	−11.06%
Turnout		19,955	95.59%	2.32%
Registered electors		21,046		35.04%
INC hold		Swing	-6.17%	

=== Assembly Election 1989 ===
1989 Nagaland Legislative Assembly election: Ghaspani II
Party	Candidate	Votes	%	±%
INC	L. Hekiye Sema	8,351	58.33%	40.77%
NPF	Rokonicha	5,967	41.67%	
Margin of victory		2,384	16.65%	16.02%
Turnout		14,318	93.27%	5.99%
Registered electors		15,585		1.06%
INC gain from NND		Swing	32.07%	

=== Assembly Election 1987 ===
1987 Nagaland Legislative Assembly election: Ghaspani II
Party	Candidate	Votes	%	±%
NND	Rokonicha	3,483	26.26%	−13.37%
Independent	Hekiye L.	3,400	25.63%	
NPP	H. Khekiho Zhimomi	3,224	24.30%	
INC	Thepfu Whetuo	2,329	17.56%	−21.32%
Independent	Seikholum	830	6.26%	
Margin of victory		83	0.63%	−0.12%
Turnout		13,266	87.28%	13.66%
Registered electors		15,421		24.14%
NND hold		Swing	-13.37%	

=== Assembly Election 1982 ===
1982 Nagaland Legislative Assembly election: Ghaspani II
Party	Candidate	Votes	%	±%
NND	Rokonicha	3,590	39.63%	
INC	Langkam	3,522	38.88%	30.66%
Independent	The Pfuwhetuo Yesa	1,307	14.43%	
Independent	Heshito Seme	464	5.12%	
Independent	Nevezo Iralu	176	1.94%	
Margin of victory		68	0.75%	−2.39%
Turnout		9,059	73.63%	−5.90%
Registered electors		12,422		34.10%
NND gain from UDA		Swing	8.71%	

=== Assembly Election 1977 ===
1977 Nagaland Legislative Assembly election: Ghaspani II
Party	Candidate	Votes	%	±%
UDA	Rokonicha	2,245	30.92%	−6.87%
Independent	Langkam	2,017	27.78%	
NCN	Nihoto Sema	1,881	25.91%	
INC	Thinovito	597	8.22%	
Independent	Tinjathang	521	7.18%	
Margin of victory		228	3.14%	1.06%
Turnout		7,261	79.53%	2.57%
Registered electors		9,263		43.10%
UDA hold		Swing	-6.87%	

=== Assembly Election 1974 ===
1974 Nagaland Legislative Assembly election: Ghaspani II
Party	Candidate	Votes	%	±%
UDA	Rokonicha Kuotsü	1,815	37.79%	
NNO	Langkam	1,715	35.71%	
Independent	Scato Rotokha	1,273	26.50%	
Margin of victory		100	2.08%	
Turnout		4,803	76.97%	
Registered electors		6,473		
UDA win (new seat)				

== See also ==
- List of constituencies of the Nagaland Legislative Assembly
- Dimapur district
