= 1989 Nagaland Legislative Assembly election =

Legislative Assembly election in Nagaland, India

- 21 January 1989

All 60 seats in the Nagaland Legislative Assembly 31 seats needed for a majority
- Registered: 582,416
- Turnout: 85.65%
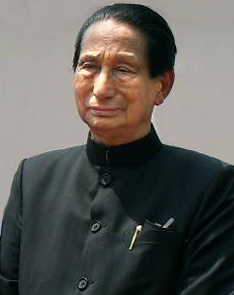
	Majority party	Minority party
		NPC
Leader	S. C. Jamir	Unknown
Party	INC	NPC
Leader's seat	Mokokchung Town
Seats before	34
Seats won	36	24
Seat change	▲2	New
Popular vote	51.45%	41.61%
CM before election
President's Rule
Elected CM
S. C. Jamir
INC

Elections to the Nagaland Legislative Assembly were held in January 1989 to elect members of the 60 constituencies in Nagaland, India. The Indian National Congress won a majority of seats and S. C. Jamir was appointed as the Chief Minister of Nagaland. The number of constituencies was set as 60 by the recommendation of the Delimitation Commission of India.

== Result ==
Party	Votes	%	Seats	+/–
Indian National Congress	253,792	51.45	36	▲2
Naga People's Front	205,283	41.61	24	New
National People's Party	13,596	2.76	0	New
Independents	20,625	4.18	0	–
Total	493,296	100.00	60	0
Valid votes	493,296	98.89		
Invalid/blank votes	5,526	1.11		
Total votes	498,822	100.00		
Registered voters/turnout	582,416	85.65		
Source: ECI

=== Results by constituency ===
Winner, runner-up, voter turnout, and victory margin in every constituency
Assembly Constituency		Turnout	Winner				Runner Up				Margin
#k	Names	%	Candidate	Party	Votes	%	Candidate	Party	Votes	%	Margin
1	Dimapur I	58.01	Vikheshe Sema	INC	11,719	64.21	Manik Bhattacharjee	NPF	4,852	26.58	6,867
2	Dimapur II	73.85	Imtisunget Jamir	INC	18,468	79.99	Webansao	NPF	4,081	17.68	14,387
3	Dimapur III	77.36	Kihoto Hollohon	NPF	4,413	51.60	Vihepu Yephthomi	INC	3,900	45.60	513
4	Ghaspani I	67.62	H. Khekiho Zhimomi	NPF	10,000	44.45	Shikiho Sema	INC	8,799	39.11	1,201
5	Ghaspani II	93.27	L. Hekiye Sema	INC	8,351	57.45	Rokonicha	NPF	5,967	41.05	2,384
6	Tening	99.30	T. R. Zeliang	NPF	3,387	39.59	H. L. Singson	INC	2,721	31.80	666
7	Peren	89.75	Bangdi Lheilung	NPF	4,429	47.63	Ata	INC	3,622	38.95	807
8	Western Angami	73.57	N. T. Nakhro	NPF	3,499	53.24	Crellan Peseyie	INC	2,951	44.90	548
9	Kohima Town	66.87	K. V. Keditsu	NPF	5,182	50.09	Khrieketoulie	INC	4,957	47.91	225
10	Northern Angami I	81.78	Tseivilie Miachieo	INC	3,273	55.47	Dr. Shürhozelie Liezietsu	NPF	2,535	42.96	738
11	Northern Angami II	87.41	Neiphiu Rio	INC	4,366	50.99	Chupfuo	NPF	4,063	47.45	303
12	Tseminyü	94.62	Khasu	NPF	4,350	52.99	Nillo	INC	3,799	46.28	551
13	Pughoboto	91.49	Joshua Achumi	NPF	2,386	39.91	Huska Sumi	NPP	2,063	34.50	323
14	Southern Angami I	89.52	Mavil Khieya	INC	3,241	52.54	Diethoo	NPF	2,874	46.59	367
15	Southern Angami II	85.91	Vizadel Sakhrie	NPF	2,715	50.54	Viswesül Pusa	INC	2,613	48.64	102
16	Pfütsero	85.56	Thenucho	NPF	3,821	50.00	Lhiweshelo Mero	INC	3,732	48.84	89
17	Chizami	95.00	K. G. Kenye	NPF	3,463	44.65	Zhovehu Lohe	INC	3,313	42.72	150
18	Chozuba	88.08	Melhupra Vero	INC	4,870	50.07	Vamuzo Phesao	NPF	4,759	48.93	111
19	Phek	85.47	Zachilhu Vadeo	INC	4,128	54.78	Vejoyi	NPF	3,320	44.06	808
20	Meluri	94.55	Khuosatho	INC	3,206	42.06	Chiekhutso	NPF	2,649	34.75	557
21	Tuli	98.97	Tsuknungpenzu	INC	5,356	50.52	T. Tali	NPF	5,224	49.27	132
22	Arkakong	96.79	Jongpongchiten	INC	4,175	49.43	Marchiba	NPF	2,923	34.61	1,252
23	Impur	98.28	T. Chuba	INC	4,135	42.75	N. Yabang Aier	IND	3,732	38.59	403
24	Angetyongpang	93.05	S. Lima	INC	3,837	48.98	Temsu Ao	IND	2,324	29.67	1,513
25	Mongoya	83.00	N. I. Jamir	INC	4,713	64.03	Nungsanginba	NPF	2,586	35.13	2,127
26	Aonglenden	95.09	Nungshizenba	INC	6,293	92.02	Alichiba	NPF	506	7.40	5,787
27	Mokokchung Town	89.14	S. C. Jamir	INC	2,017	81.33	Takuyaba	NPF	411	16.57	1,606
28	Koridang	95.38	L. Nokzenketba	INC	3,574	36.14	Bendangtoshi	NPF	2,867	28.99	707
29	Jangpetkong	95.54	Chubatemjen Ao	INC	3,201	53.57	I. Imkong	NPF	2,734	45.76	467
30	Alongtaki	98.18	Tiameren Imchen	INC	3,305	55.26	Imnanungsang	NPF	2,643	44.19	662
31	Akuluto	89.53	I. Khehoto Sema	INC	2,017	51.14	I. Vitokhe Sema	NPF	1,912	48.48	105
32	Atoizu	88.25	Kiyezhe L. Chishi	NPF	3,016	51.33	Yeshito	INC	2,839	48.32	177
33	Suruhoto	93.12	Khukivi Awomi	NPF	3,328	55.23	Kiyezhe Aye	INC	2,670	44.31	658
34	Aghunato	88.38	Pukhayi	INC	2,780	53.50	Nihokhe	NPF	2,370	45.61	410
35	Zünheboto	71.05	Tokheho Yepthomi	NPF	3,187	49.61	Ghutoshe Sema	INC	3,165	49.27	22
36	Satakha	89.56	Hokheto Sema	INC	3,088	50.90	Kughavi	NPF	2,807	46.27	281
37	Tyüi	89.37	T. A. Nguillie	INC	4,796	54.84	N. L. Odyuo	NPF	3,912	44.73	884
38	Wokha	78.81	Dr. T. M. Lotha	NPF	5,346	51.77	John Lotha	INC	4,879	47.25	467
39	Sanis	86.88	T. Nchibemo Ngullie	INC	2,960	40.70	Nkhao Lotha	NPF	2,658	36.55	302
40	Bhandari	87.08	E. Thungohamo Ezung	INC	5,071	54.43	Tsenlamo Kikon	NPF	4,189	44.97	882
41	Tizit	94.55	Yeangphong	NPF	5,149	53.06	B. Tingkap Wangnao	INC	4,363	44.96	786
42	Wakching	93.63	Chingwang Konyak	INC	4,853	49.62	P. Enyei	NPF	4,809	49.17	44
43	Tapi	98.80	Noke Wangnao	NPF	2,753	37.09	K. Tingnei K	INC	2,495	33.62	258
44	Phomching	58.13	Kongam	INC	3,940	86.37	P. Pohwang	NPF	603	13.22	3,337
45	Tehok	98.02	C. Nocklem Konyak	INC	4,292	52.25	T. P. Manlen Konyak	NPF	3,902	47.50	390
46	Mon Town	88.33	S. Yokten	NPF	5,248	49.84	John Konyak	INC	5,181	49.20	67
47	Aboi	93.94	Nyeiwang Konyak	INC	3,324	50.12	W. Eyung	NPF	3,255	49.08	69
48	Moka	98.88	K. Kiko Konyak	INC	5,064	61.15	Nyamnyei	NPF	3,169	38.27	1,895
49	Tamlu	99.85	Pangjak S. Phom	NPF	3,501	52.39	Bamgtick Phom	INC	3,165	47.37	336
50	Longleng	99.28	Bukchem Phom	NPF	5,003	55.34	Chenlom Phom	INC	4,025	44.52	978
51	Noksen	97.64	C. Chongshen Chang	INC	3,809	85.19	S. Sao Chang	NPF	612	13.69	3,197
52	Longkhim Chare	96.01	S. Kyukhangba Sangtam	INC	4,831	57.00	Thrinimong Sangtam	NPF	3,609	42.58	1,222
53	Tuensang Sadar I	82.30	Changkong Chang	INC	4,222	58.90	S. Khoney	NPF	2,856	39.84	1,366
54	Tuensang Sadar II	98.89	Lakiumong	NPF	3,419	55.58	M. B. Yimkong	INC	2,696	43.83	723
55	Tobu	82.36	Neakba Konyak	NPF	5,636	64.71	Pongchai	INC	3,047	34.98	2,589
56	Noklak	93.45	Sedem Khaming	INC	2,693	42.81	Tongthan	IND	2,621	41.66	72
57	Thonoknyu	97.70	Khongo	NPF	3,123	45.93	P. Pongom	INC	2,827	41.58	296
58	Shamator–Chessore	93.26	Yamukum	NPF	3,816	54.63	K. Zungkum Yimchunger	INC	3,135	44.88	681
59	Seyochung–Sitimi	89.85	S. Sethricho Sangtam	INC	3,732	55.19	Yopikyu Thongtsar	NPF	2,993	44.26	739
60	Pungro–Kiphire	93.89	T. Rothrong	INC	3,713	38.20	T. Porechw	IND	3,693	38.00	20

== See also ==
- List of constituencies of the Nagaland Legislative Assembly
