= Liezietsu ministry =

This is a list of minister from Shürhozelie Liezietsu cabinet starting from 22 February 2017 to 19 July 2017. Shurhozelie Liezietsu is the leader of Naga People's Front was sworn in the Chief Ministers of Nagaland on 22 February 2017. The ministry had 11 Cabinet ministers including the Chief Minister. The following is the list of ministers of his ministry. The government lasted for 147 days after a coup by T. R. Zeliang.

== Council of Ministers ==
Office	Name	Took office	Left office	Party
Chief Minister	Shürhozelie Liezietsu	22 February 2017	19 July 2017	Naga People's Front
Cabinet Minister	Kiyanilie Peseyie	22 February 2017	19 July 2017	Naga People's Front
Cabinet Minister	Yanthungo Patton	22 February 2017	19 July 2017	Naga People's Front
Cabinet Minister	P. Longon	22 February 2017	19 July 2017	Naga People's Front
Cabinet Minister	C. Kipili Sangtam	22 February 2017	19 July 2017	Naga People's Front
Cabinet Minister	C. L. John	22 February 2017	19 July 2017	Naga People's Front
Cabinet Minister	Yitachu	22 February 2017	19 July 2017	Naga People's Front
Cabinet Minister	P. Paiwang Konyak	22 February 2017	19 July 2017	Naga People's Front
Cabinet Minister	Vikheho Swu	22 February 2017	19 July 2017	Naga People's Front
Cabinet Minister	Chotisuh Sazo	22 February 2017	19 July 2017	Naga People's Front
Cabinet Minister	Imkong L Imchen	22 February 2017	19 July 2017	Naga People's Front
Cabinet Minister	G. Kaito Aye	22 February 2017	19 July 2017	Naga People's Front
