= Zhaleo Rio =

Indian politician

Member of Nagaland Legislative Assembly
- Incumbent
- Assumed office 2013
- Preceded by: Kihoto Hollohon
- Constituency: Ghaspani II

Personal details
- Born: 1 March 1953 (age 73) Tuophema, Assam, India (present-day Kohima district, Nagaland)
- Party: Naga People's Front
- Other political affiliations: Nationalist Democratic Progressive Party
- Relatives: Neiphiu Rio (brother)

Zhaleo Rio is a Naga People's Front politician from Nagaland. He is a three-term member of the Nagaland Legislative Assembly, and has served as advisor to the chief minister in multiple departments.

== Political career ==
He was first elected to the Nagaland Legislative Assembly from Ghaspani II constituency in 2013 as a candidate of the Naga People's Front. He defeated his nearest rival Y. Hewoto Awomi of the Indian National Congress (INC) by a margin of 2388 votes. In 2018 he won the seat as a candidate of the Nationalist Democratic Progressive Party (NDPP). He was the deputy speaker of the Nagaland Legislative Assembly from 2018 to 2019 before being named as an advisor to Chief Minister of Nagaland Neiphiu Rio and being allocated three departments (Sericulture, Excise and Minority Affairs).

== Personal life ==
He is the brother of Nagaland Chief Minister, Neiphiu Rio.
