= Dimapur III Assembly constituency =

Legislative Assembly constituency in Nagaland State, India

Coordinates: 25.8°N 93.65°E

Dimapur III
- Constituency No. 3 for the Nagaland Legislative Assembly

Constituency details
- Country: India
- Region: Northeast India
- State: Nagaland
- District: Chümoukedima
- Lok Sabha constituency: Nagaland
- Established: 1974
- Total electors: 38,045
- Reservation: ST

Member of Legislative Assembly
- 14th Nagaland Legislative Assembly
- Incumbent Hekani Jakhalu Kense
- Party: NPF
- Alliance: NDA
- Elected year: 2023

Dimapur III is one of the 60 Legislative Assembly constituencies of Nagaland state in India. Previously part of Dimapur district, it is now a part of Chümoukedima district and is reserved for candidates belonging to the Scheduled Tribes. It is also part of Nagaland Lok Sabha constituency.

== Members of the Legislative Assembly ==
- 1974: Debalai Mech, Naga Nationalist Organisation
- 1977: Debalal Mech, Indian National Congress
- 1982: Lolit Mech, Indian National Congress
- 1987: Vehepu Yepthomi, Independent
- 1989: Kihoto Hollohon, Nagaland People's Council
- 1993: Kihoto Hollohon, Indian National Congress
- 1998: Atovi Sumi, Indian National Congress
- 2003: Kihoto Hollohon, Nationalist Democratic Movement

Year	Member	Party
2008	Azheto Zhimomi	Indian National Congress
2009*	Azheto Zhimomi	Naga People's Front
2013	Tokheho	Indian National Congress
2018	Azheto Zhimomi	Naga People's Front
2023	Hekani Jakhalu Kense	Nationalist Democratic Progressive Party

== Election results ==
Vote share of winning candidates
2023	45.16%
2018	48.82%
2013	53.22%
2008	50.38%
2003	46.05%
1998	85.30%
1993	58.10%
1989	53.09%
1987	48.36%
1982	60.22%
1977	41.16%
1974	52.29%

=== Assembly Election 2023 ===
2023 Nagaland Legislative Assembly election: Dimapur III
Party	Candidate	Votes	%	±%
NDPP	Hekani Jakhalu Kense	14,395	45.16%	
LJP(RV)	Azheto Zhimomi	12,859	40.34%	
Independent	Lun Tungnung	2,445	7.67%	
Independent	Kahuto Chishi Sumi	1,671	5.24%	
INC	Vetetso Lasuh	370	1.16%	−6.82%
NOTA	Nota	134	0.42%	−0.09%
Margin of victory		1,536	4.82%	−3.11%
Turnout		31,874	83.78%	2.64%
Registered electors		38,045		14.51%
NDPP gain from NPF		Swing	-3.66%	

=== Assembly Election 2018 ===
2018 Nagaland Legislative Assembly election: Dimapur III
Party	Candidate	Votes	%	±%
NPF	Azheto Zhimomi	13,162	48.82%	4.04%
NDPP	Tokheho	11,024	40.89%	
INC	Lun Tungnung	2,152	7.98%	−45.24%
NPP	Wedie-U Kronu	483	1.79%	
NOTA	None of the Above	137	0.51%	
Margin of victory		2,138	7.93%	−0.51%
Turnout		26,958	81.14%	−5.61%
Registered electors		33,223		19.75%
NPF gain from INC		Swing	-4.40%	

=== Assembly Election 2013 ===
2013 Nagaland Legislative Assembly election: Dimapur III
Party	Candidate	Votes	%	±%
INC	Tokheho Yepthomi	12,809	53.22%	2.84%
NPF	Azheto Zhimomi	10,778	44.78%	26.97%
BJP	Lachit Khersa	328	1.36%	
NCP	Er. Dr.L.Yezhekhu Sumi	152	0.63%	
Margin of victory		2,031	8.44%	−10.78%
Turnout		24,068	86.75%	8.34%
Registered electors		27,744		39.20%
INC hold		Swing	2.84%	

=== Assembly Election 2008 ===
2008 Nagaland Legislative Assembly election: Dimapur III
Party	Candidate	Votes	%	±%
INC	Azheto Zhimomi	7,874	50.38%	43.48%
RJD	L. Inazhe Sema	4,871	31.17%	
NPF	V. Abu Metha	2,784	17.81%	−26.23%
Independent	Akhei Achumi	170	1.09%	
Margin of victory		3,003	19.22%	17.20%
Turnout		15,628	78.77%	−5.32%
Registered electors		19,931		17.30%
INC gain from NDM		Swing	4.33%	

=== Assembly Election 2003 ===
2003 Nagaland Legislative Assembly election: Dimapur III
Party	Candidate	Votes	%	±%
NDM	Kihoto Hollohon	6,549	46.05%	
NPF	Azheto Zhimomi	6,263	44.04%	
INC	Atovi Sumi	982	6.91%	−78.39%
Independent	Anupama Mech	427	3.00%	
Margin of victory		286	2.01%	−68.58%
Turnout		14,221	83.73%	0.42%
Registered electors		16,992		−0.34%
NDM gain from INC		Swing	-12.05%	

=== Assembly Election 1998 ===
1998 Nagaland Legislative Assembly election: Dimapur III
Party	Candidate	Votes	%	±%
INC	Atovi Sumi	1,955	85.30%	27.19%
Independent	T. L. Angami	337	14.70%	
Margin of victory		1,618	70.59%	27.70%
Turnout		2,292	13.68%	−69.63%
Registered electors		17,050		25.61%
INC hold		Swing	27.19%	

=== Assembly Election 1993 ===
1993 Nagaland Legislative Assembly election: Dimapur III
Party	Candidate	Votes	%	±%
INC	Kihoto Hollohon	6,478	58.10%	11.19%
Independent	Rajiv	1,696	15.21%	
NPF	Vihepu Yephthomi	1,551	13.91%	−39.17%
Independent	Chupfuo	1,424	12.77%	
Margin of victory		4,782	42.89%	36.72%
Turnout		11,149	83.31%	5.95%
Registered electors		13,574		22.79%
INC gain from NPF		Swing	5.02%	

=== Assembly Election 1989 ===
1989 Nagaland Legislative Assembly election: Dimapur III
Party	Candidate	Votes	%	±%
NPF	Kihoto Hollohon	4,413	53.09%	
INC	Vihepu Yephthomi	3,900	46.91%	29.55%
Margin of victory		513	6.17%	−9.66%
Turnout		8,313	77.36%	−3.23%
Registered electors		11,055		0.67%
NPF gain from Independent		Swing	4.73%	

=== Assembly Election 1987 ===
1987 Nagaland Legislative Assembly election: Dimapur III
Party	Candidate	Votes	%	±%
Independent	Vihepu Yephthomi	4,200	48.36%	
NND	Prodep Singyong	2,825	32.53%	
INC	Lolit Mech	1,508	17.36%	−42.85%
Independent	Lhousao	152	1.75%	
Margin of victory		1,375	15.83%	−24.45%
Turnout		8,685	80.58%	1.82%
Registered electors		10,981		69.98%
Independent gain from INC		Swing	-11.86%	

=== Assembly Election 1982 ===
1982 Nagaland Legislative Assembly election: Dimapur III
Party	Candidate	Votes	%	±%
INC	Lolit Mech	2,994	60.22%	19.06%
NND	Dabalal Mech	991	19.93%	
Independent	Joy Prasad	987	19.85%	
Margin of victory		2,003	40.29%	30.06%
Turnout		4,972	78.76%	−9.10%
Registered electors		6,460		26.22%
INC hold		Swing	19.06%	

=== Assembly Election 1977 ===
1977 Nagaland Legislative Assembly election: Dimapur III
Party	Candidate	Votes	%	±%
INC	Dabalal Mech	1,807	41.16%	
Independent	Satish Langtha	1,358	30.93%	
UDA	Gobinda Ch. Paira	1,225	27.90%	
Margin of victory		449	10.23%	−3.87%
Turnout		4,390	87.87%	4.24%
Registered electors		5,118		20.76%
INC gain from NNO		Swing	-11.13%	

=== Assembly Election 1974 ===
1974 Nagaland Legislative Assembly election: Dimapur III
Party	Candidate	Votes	%	±%
NNO	Dabalal Mech	1,780	52.29%	
Independent	Sompurno Kachari	1,300	38.19%	
UDA	Mukunda Ram Mech	324	9.52%	
Margin of victory		480	14.10%	
Turnout		3,404	83.62%	
Registered electors		4,238		
NNO win (new seat)				

== See also ==
- List of constituencies of the Nagaland Legislative Assembly
- Dimapur district
- Dimapur
- Nagaland Lok Sabha constituency
