= Tehok Assembly constituency =

Legislative Assembly constituency in Nagaland State, India

Coordinates: 26.6°N 95.13°E

Tehok
- Constituency No. 45 for the Nagaland Legislative Assembly

Constituency details
- Country: India
- Region: Northeast India
- State: Nagaland
- District: Mon
- Lok Sabha constituency: Nagaland
- Established: 1974
- Total electors: 12,209
- Reservation: ST

Member of Legislative Assembly
- 14th Nagaland Legislative Assembly
- Incumbent C. L. John
- Party: NPF
- Alliance: NDA
- Elected year: 2023

Tehok is one of the 60 Legislative Assembly constituencies of Nagaland state in India.

It is part of Mon district and is reserved for candidates belonging to the Scheduled Tribes.

== Members of the Legislative Assembly ==
Year	Member	Party
1974	Hentok	Nagaland Nationalist Organisation
1977	Manlem	Independent politician
1982	C. Nocklem Konyak	Indian National Congress
1987	T. P. Manlen Konyak	Naga National Democratic Party
1989	C. Nocklem Konyak	Indian National Congress
1993	T. P. Manlen Konyak	Naga People's Front
1998	W. Wongyuh Konyak	Indian National Congress
2003	W. Wongyuh Konyak	Indian National Congress
2004 by-election	Shaboh	Indian National Congress
2008	C. L. John	Naga People's Front
2013	C. L. John	Naga People's Front
2018	C. L. John	Naga People's Front
2023	C. L. John	Nationalist Democratic Progressive Party

== Election results ==
=== 2023 Assembly election ===
2023 Nagaland Legislative Assembly election: Tehok
Party	Candidate	Votes	%	±%
NDPP	C. L. John	9,232	78.55%	
NPF	C. Kawang Konyak	2,162	18.40%	−51.16%
LJP(RV)	Chingkai Konyak	149	1.27%	
INC	Shaboh Konyak	120	1.02%	0.60%
CPI	M. M. Throma Konyak	47	0.40%	
Independent	Dr. Chingo Walim	24	0.20%	
NOTA	Nota	19	0.16%	
Margin of victory		7,070	60.15%	17.69%
Turnout		11,753	96.27%	4.08%
Registered electors		12,209		4.89%
NDPP gain from NPF		Swing	9.00%	

=== 2018 Assembly election ===
2018 Nagaland Legislative Assembly election: Tehok
Party	Candidate	Votes	%	±%
NPF	C. L. John	7,463	69.55%	−7.71%
BJP	C. Kawang Konyak	2,907	27.09%	26.43%
NPP	Chingkai Konyak	268	2.50%	
NOTA	None of the Above	47	0.44%	
INC	Shaboh Konyak	45	0.42%	−21.00%
Margin of victory		4,556	42.46%	−13.39%
Turnout		10,730	92.18%	0.75%
Registered electors		11,640		−24.67%
NPF hold		Swing	-7.71%	

=== 2013 Assembly election ===
2013 Nagaland Legislative Assembly election: Tehok
Party	Candidate	Votes	%	±%
NPF	C. L. John	10,917	77.27%	23.28%
INC	W. Wongyuh Konyak	3,026	21.42%	−22.89%
BJP	M. M. Throma Konyak	93	0.66%	
NCP	T. P. Yaeih Konyak	88	0.62%	
Margin of victory		7,891	55.85%	46.18%
Turnout		14,129	91.43%	−0.21%
Registered electors		15,453		−2.36%
NPF hold		Swing	23.28%	

=== 2008 Assembly election ===
2008 Nagaland Legislative Assembly election: Tehok
Party	Candidate	Votes	%	±%
NPF	C. L. John	7,829	53.98%	5.61%
INC	Shaboh	6,426	44.31%	−5.41%
RJD	Chennyeim	356	2.45%	
Adarsh Political Party	Thronwa	81	0.56%	
Margin of victory		1,403	9.67%	8.33%
Turnout		14,503	92.83%	−6.94%
Registered electors		15,826		15.37%
NPF gain from INC		Swing	4.27%	

=== 2004 Assembly by-election ===
2004 Nagaland Legislative Assembly by-election: Tehok
Party	Candidate	Votes	%	±%
INC	Shaboh	6,723	49.72%	−2.90%
NPF	C. L. John	6,541	48.37%	11.50%
JD(S)	Chennyeim	160	1.18%	
BJP	Yaju	99	0.73%	−1.75%
Margin of victory		182	1.35%	−14.40%
Turnout		13,523	98.58%	0.42%
Registered electors		13,718		2.21%
INC hold		Swing		

=== 2003 Assembly election ===
2003 Nagaland Legislative Assembly election: Tehok
Party	Candidate	Votes	%	±%
INC	W. Wongyuh Konyak	6,748	52.62%	
NPF	Noklem	4,729	36.87%	
NDM	Chennyeim	906	7.06%	
BJP	Yaju	318	2.48%	
RLD	Y. Tapa	124	0.97%	
Margin of victory		2,019	15.74%	
Turnout		12,825	98.16%	98.16%
Registered electors		13,421		2.01%
INC hold		Swing		

=== 1998 Assembly election ===
1998 Nagaland Legislative Assembly election: Tehok
Party	Candidate	Votes	%	±%
INC	W. Wongyuh Konyak	Unopposed		
Registered electors		13,156		0.70%
INC gain from NPF		Swing		

=== 1993 Assembly election ===
1993 Nagaland Legislative Assembly election: Tehok
Party	Candidate	Votes	%	±%
NPF	T. P. Manlen Konyak	9,443	76.47%	28.85%
INC	Chennyeim	2,821	22.85%	−29.53%
Independent	C. Nocklem Konyak	84	0.68%	
Margin of victory		6,622	53.63%	48.87%
Turnout		12,348	94.67%	−3.35%
Registered electors		13,065		55.91%
NPF gain from INC		Swing	24.09%	

=== 1989 Assembly election ===
1989 Nagaland Legislative Assembly election: Tehok
Party	Candidate	Votes	%	±%
INC	C. Nocklem Konyak	4,292	52.38%	12.33%
NPF	T. P. Manlen Konyak	3,902	47.62%	
Margin of victory		390	4.76%	3.03%
Turnout		8,194	98.02%	1.13%
Registered electors		8,380		−0.01%
INC gain from NND		Swing	10.60%	

=== 1987 Assembly election ===
1987 Nagaland Legislative Assembly election: Tehok
Party	Candidate	Votes	%	±%
NND	T. P. Manlen Konyak	3,382	41.78%	−6.60%
INC	C. Nocklem Konyak	3,242	40.05%	−11.56%
Independent	Locknyem	1,470	18.16%	
Margin of victory		140	1.73%	−1.49%
Turnout		8,094	96.89%	−0.78%
Registered electors		8,381		8.75%
NND gain from INC		Swing	-9.83%	

=== 1982 Assembly election ===
1982 Nagaland Legislative Assembly election: Tehok
Party	Candidate	Votes	%	±%
INC	C. Nocklem Konyak	3,827	51.61%	34.19%
NND	T. P. Manlen Konyak	3,588	48.39%	
Margin of victory		239	3.22%	−0.04%
Turnout		7,415	97.66%	5.89%
Registered electors		7,707		10.61%
INC gain from Independent		Swing	23.11%	

=== 1977 Assembly election ===
1977 Nagaland Legislative Assembly election: Tehok
Party	Candidate	Votes	%	±%
Independent	Manlem	1,782	28.50%	
Independent	Noklem	1,578	25.24%	
UDA	Yanpoh	1,217	19.47%	−10.85%
INC	Hondok	1,089	17.42%	
NCN	Loknyem	586	9.37%	
Margin of victory		204	3.26%	−7.01%
Turnout		6,252	91.78%	7.64%
Registered electors		6,968		14.93%
Independent gain from NNO		Swing	-12.08%	

=== 1974 Assembly election ===
1974 Nagaland Legislative Assembly election: Tehok
Party	Candidate	Votes	%	±%
NNO	Hentok	2,031	40.59%	
UDA	Manlem	1,517	30.32%	
Independent	Manlem	1,456	29.10%	
Margin of victory		514	10.27%	
Turnout		5,004	84.13%	
Registered electors		6,063		
NNO win (new seat)				

== See also ==
- List of constituencies of the Nagaland Legislative Assembly
- Mon district
