= Tapi Assembly constituency =

Legislative Assembly constituency in Nagaland State, India

Coordinates: 26.71°N 95.07°E

Tapi
- Constituency No. 43 for the Nagaland Legislative Assembly

Constituency details
- Country: India
- Region: Northeast India
- State: Nagaland
- District: Mon
- Lok Sabha constituency: Nagaland
- Established: 1974
- Total electors: 15,220
- Reservation: ST

Member of Legislative Assembly
- 14th Nagaland Legislative Assembly
- Incumbent Wangpang Konyak
- Party: NPF
- Alliance: NDA
- Elected year: 2023

Tapi is one of the 60 Legislative Assembly constituencies of Nagaland state in India.

It is part of Mon district and is reserved for candidates belonging to the Scheduled Tribes.

== Members of the Legislative Assembly ==
Year	Member	Party
1974	Noke Wangnao	United Democratic Alliance
1977	Noke Wangnao	United Democratic Alliance
1982	Noke Wangnao	Naga National Democratic Party
1987	Noke Wangnao	Naga National Democratic Party
1989	Noke Wangnao	Naga People's Front
1993	Bongnao	Indian National Congress
1998	Bongnao	Indian National Congress
2003	Noke Wangnao	Naga People's Front
2008	Lanpha Konyak	Indian National Congress
2013	Noke Wangnao	Naga People's Front
2018	Noke Wangnao	Nationalist Democratic Progressive Party
2023	Noke Wangnao	Nationalist Democratic Progressive Party
2023^{[A]}	Wangpang Konyak	Nationalist Democratic Progressive Party

- A by–election

== Election results ==
=== 2023 by-election ===
Nagaland Legislative Assembly by-election, 2023: Tapi
Party	Candidate	Votes	%	±%
NDPP	Wangpang Konyak	10,053	67.84%	+27.7%
INC	Wanglem Konyak	4,720	31.85%	New
NOTA	None of the Above	45	0.3	+0.01%
Majority		5,333	35.99	+35.43%
Turnout		14,818	96.12%	+0.14%
NDPP hold		Swing		

=== 2023 Assembly election ===
2023 Nagaland Legislative Assembly election: Tapi
Party	Candidate	Votes	%	±%
NDPP	Noke Wangnao	5,864	40.14%	2.06%
NPF	Wanglem Konyak	5,782	39.58%	31.52%
JD(U)	Geihwang Konyak	2,770	18.96%	−8.12%
NPP	A. Epha	150	1.03%	−3.85%
NOTA	Nota	42	0.29%	
Margin of victory		82	0.56%	−10.44%
Turnout		14,608	95.98%	4.69%
Registered electors		15,220		23.52%
NDPP hold		Swing	2.06%	

=== 2018 Assembly election ===
2018 Nagaland Legislative Assembly election: Tapi
Party	Candidate	Votes	%	±%
NDPP	Noke Wangnao	4,284	38.08%	
JD(U)	N. Aphoa Konyak	3,047	27.09%	
INC	Lanpha Konyak	2,426	21.57%	−11.61%
NPF	Tingthok Konyak	907	8.06%	−45.69%
NPP	Wanglem Konyak	549	4.88%	
NOTA	None of the Above	36	0.32%	
Margin of victory		1,237	11.00%	−9.58%
Turnout		11,249	91.29%	3.00%
Registered electors		12,322		−16.44%
NDPP gain from NPF		Swing	-15.67%	

=== 2013 Assembly election ===
2013 Nagaland Legislative Assembly election: Tapi
Party	Candidate	Votes	%	±%
NPF	Noke Wangnao	6,998	53.75%	7.46%
INC	Lanpha Konyak	4,319	33.17%	−20.77%
Independent	Wanglem Konyak	1,700	13.06%	
Margin of victory		2,679	20.58%	12.93%
Turnout		13,019	88.29%	−1.08%
Registered electors		14,746		2.41%
NPF gain from INC		Swing	-0.19%	

=== 2008 Assembly election ===
2008 Nagaland Legislative Assembly election: Tapi
Party	Candidate	Votes	%	±%
INC	Lanpha Konyak	6,941	53.94%	23.35%
NPF	Noke Wangnao	5,957	46.29%	13.99%
Margin of victory		984	7.65%	5.93%
Turnout		12,868	89.58%	−9.07%
Registered electors		14,399		35.85%
INC gain from NPF		Swing	21.64%	

=== 2003 Assembly election ===
2003 Nagaland Legislative Assembly election: Tapi
Party	Candidate	Votes	%	±%
NPF	Noke Wangnao	3,328	32.30%	
INC	Lanpha Konyak	3,151	30.59%	
NDM	M. Longmeth	2,794	27.12%	
BJP	Aphao	1,029	9.99%	
Margin of victory		177	1.72%	
Turnout		10,302	98.43%	98.43%
Registered electors		10,599		9.78%
NPF gain from INC		Swing	-24.99%	

=== 1998 Assembly election ===
1998 Nagaland Legislative Assembly election: Tapi
Party	Candidate	Votes	%	±%
INC	Bongnao	Unopposed		
Registered electors		9,655		2.34%
INC hold		Swing		

=== 1993 Assembly election ===
1993 Nagaland Legislative Assembly election: Tapi
Party	Candidate	Votes	%	±%
INC	Bongnao	4,756	57.29%	23.34%
NPF	Noke Wangnao	3,545	42.71%	5.24%
Margin of victory		1,211	14.59%	11.08%
Turnout		8,301	88.31%	−10.49%
Registered electors		9,434		25.59%
INC gain from NPF		Swing	19.83%	

=== 1989 Assembly election ===
1989 Nagaland Legislative Assembly election: Tapi
Party	Candidate	Votes	%	±%
NPF	Noke Wangnao	2,753	37.46%	
INC	K. Tingnei K	2,495	33.95%	3.59%
NPP	Bongnao	2,049	27.88%	
Independent	Benthak	52	0.71%	
Margin of victory		258	3.51%	−9.33%
Turnout		7,349	98.80%	1.70%
Registered electors		7,512		0.00%
NPF gain from NND		Swing	-5.74%	

=== 1987 Assembly election ===
1987 Nagaland Legislative Assembly election: Tapi
Party	Candidate	Votes	%	±%
NND	Noke Wangnao	3,125	43.20%	−3.53%
INC	M. L. Tongwang	2,196	30.36%	3.07%
Independent	Benjei	1,912	26.43%	
Margin of victory		929	12.84%	−6.60%
Turnout		7,233	97.10%	4.14%
Registered electors		7,512		4.33%
NND hold		Swing	-3.53%	

=== 1982 Assembly election ===
1982 Nagaland Legislative Assembly election: Tapi
Party	Candidate	Votes	%	±%
NND	Noke Wangnao	3,074	46.73%	
INC	Benja	1,795	27.29%	7.18%
Independent	N. L. Tengwang	1,709	25.98%	
Margin of victory		1,279	19.44%	−10.96%
Turnout		6,578	92.96%	10.19%
Registered electors		7,200		12.78%
NND gain from UDA		Swing	-3.78%	

=== 1977 Assembly election ===
1977 Nagaland Legislative Assembly election: Tapi
Party	Candidate	Votes	%	±%
UDA	Noke Wangnao	2,600	50.51%	−9.45%
INC	Hoka Konyak	1,035	20.11%	
NCN	M. L. Tongwang	809	15.72%	
Independent	Lanpha Konyak	703	13.66%	
Margin of victory		1,565	30.41%	−1.56%
Turnout		5,147	82.77%	6.94%
Registered electors		6,384		26.37%
UDA hold		Swing	-9.45%	

=== 1974 Assembly election ===
1974 Nagaland Legislative Assembly election: Tapi
Party	Candidate	Votes	%	±%
UDA	Noke Wangnao	2,155	59.96%	
NNO	Mankho	1,006	27.99%	
Independent	Menyong	433	12.05%	
Margin of victory		1,149	31.97%	
Turnout		3,594	75.83%	1. VALUE!
Registered electors		5,052		
UDA win (new seat)				

== See also ==
- List of constituencies of the Nagaland Legislative Assembly
- Mon district
