= Zünheboto Assembly constituency =

Legislative Assembly constituency in Nagaland State, India

Coordinates: 26.01°N 94.52°E

Zünheboto
- Constituency No. 35 for the Nagaland Legislative Assembly

Constituency details
- Country: India
- Region: Northeast India
- State: Nagaland
- District: Zünheboto
- Lok Sabha constituency: Nagaland
- Established: 1964
- Total electors: 23,021
- Reservation: ST

Member of Legislative Assembly
- 14th Nagaland Legislative Assembly
- Incumbent K. Tokugha Sukhalu
- Party: NPF
- Alliance: NDA
- Elected year: 2023

Zünheboto is one of the 60 Legislative Assembly constituencies of Nagaland state in India.

It is part of Zünheboto district and is reserved for candidates belonging to the Scheduled Tribes.

== Members of the Legislative Assembly ==
Year	Member	Party
1964	Kihoto	Independent politician
1969	Tokheho Sema	Independent politician
1974	Tokheho Sema	Independent politician
1977	Ghutoshe	Indian National Congress
1982	Chutoshe	Indian National Congress
1987	Ghutoshe	Indian National Congress
1989	Tokheho	Naga People's Front
1993	Khekiho	Independent politician
1998	Kakheho	Independent politician
2003	S. Hukavi Zhimomi	Nationalist Democratic Movement
2008	Dr. K. C. Nihoshe	Independent politician
2013	S. Hukavi Zhimomi	Indian National Congress
2018	K. Tokugha Sukhalu	Nationalist Democratic Progressive Party
2023	K. Tokugha Sukhalu	Nationalist Democratic Progressive Party

== Election results ==
=== 2023 Assembly election ===
2023 Nagaland Legislative Assembly election: Zünheboto
Party	Candidate	Votes	%	±%
NDPP	K. Tokugha Sukhalu	15,921	80.04%	22.48%
NPF	Akavi Sumi	3,893	19.57%	−22.44%
NOTA	Nota	77	0.39%	
Margin of victory		12,028	60.47%	44.92%
Turnout		19,891	86.40%	6.96%
Registered electors		23,021		11.64%
NDPP hold		Swing	22.48%	

=== 2018 Assembly election ===
2018 Nagaland Legislative Assembly election: Zünheboto
Party	Candidate	Votes	%	±%
NDPP	K. Tokugha Sukhalu	9,430	57.56%	
NPF	S. Hukavi Zhimomi	6,882	42.01%	7.35%
NOTA	None of the Above	71	0.43%	
Margin of victory		2,548	15.55%	14.09%
Turnout		16,383	79.45%	−8.26%
Registered electors		20,621		−4.30%
NDPP gain from INC		Swing	21.43%	

=== 2013 Assembly election ===
2013 Nagaland Legislative Assembly election: Zünheboto
Party	Candidate	Votes	%	±%
INC	S. Hukavi Zhimomi	6,827	36.13%	−10.57%
NPF	Dr. K. C. Nihoshe	6,550	34.66%	
Independent	Atomi K. Zhimomi	5,325	28.18%	
Independent	S. Shihovi Rochill	123	0.65%	
Margin of victory		277	1.47%	−5.14%
Turnout		18,898	87.71%	9.69%
Registered electors		21,547		−6.58%
INC gain from Independent		Swing	-17.18%	

=== 2008 Assembly election ===
2008 Nagaland Legislative Assembly election: Zünheboto
Party	Candidate	Votes	%	±%
Independent	Dr. K. C. Nihoshe	9,592	53.30%	
INC	S. Hukavi Zhimomi	8,403	46.70%	3.04%
BJP	Khuvishe	414	2.30%	−9.18%
Margin of victory		1,189	6.61%	5.40%
Turnout		17,995	79.81%	5.48%
Registered electors		23,065		59.71%
Independent gain from NDM		Swing	8.44%	

=== 2003 Assembly election ===
2003 Nagaland Legislative Assembly election: Zünheboto
Party	Candidate	Votes	%	±%
NDM	S. Hukavi Zhimomi	4,700	44.86%	
INC	Kakheho	4,573	43.65%	11.75%
BJP	Tokheho	1,203	11.48%	
Margin of victory		127	1.21%	−34.97%
Turnout		10,476	72.54%	15.01%
Registered electors		14,442		6.40%
NDM gain from Independent		Swing	-9.64%	

=== 1998 Assembly election ===
1998 Nagaland Legislative Assembly election: Zünheboto
Party	Candidate	Votes	%	±%
Independent	Kakheho	5,218	68.09%	
INC	Ghutoshe Sema	2,445	31.91%	3.46%
Margin of victory		2,773	36.19%	10.12%
Turnout		7,663	57.53%	−25.37%
Registered electors		13,573		26.06%
Independent hold		Swing	13.59%	

=== 1993 Assembly election ===
1993 Nagaland Legislative Assembly election: Zünheboto
Party	Candidate	Votes	%	±%
Independent	Khekiho	4,810	54.50%	
INC	Tokheho Sema	2,510	28.44%	−21.38%
NPF	Vihoto	1,505	17.05%	−33.12%
Margin of victory		2,300	26.06%	25.72%
Turnout		8,825	82.89%	11.85%
Registered electors		10,767		19.08%
Independent gain from NPF		Swing	4.33%	

=== 1989 Assembly election ===
1989 Nagaland Legislative Assembly election: Zünheboto
Party	Candidate	Votes	%	±%
NPF	Tokheho	3,187	50.17%	
INC	Ghutoshe Sema	3,165	49.83%	12.63%
Margin of victory		22	0.35%	−11.89%
Turnout		6,352	71.05%	−2.79%
Registered electors		9,042		0.00%
NPF gain from INC		Swing	12.98%	

=== 1987 Assembly election ===
1987 Nagaland Legislative Assembly election: Zünheboto
Party	Candidate	Votes	%	±%
INC	Ghutoshe	2,432	37.19%	7.74%
NND	Tokheho	1,632	24.96%	8.95%
NPP	Vihoto	1,613	24.67%	
Independent	Aheto	862	13.18%	
Margin of victory		800	12.23%	5.83%
Turnout		6,539	73.83%	9.23%
Registered electors		9,042		−4.33%
INC hold		Swing	7.74%	

=== 1982 Assembly election ===
1982 Nagaland Legislative Assembly election: Zünheboto
Party	Candidate	Votes	%	±%
INC	Chutoshe	1,757	29.45%	−17.74%
Independent	Vihoto	1,375	23.05%	
Independent	Tokeho	1,322	22.16%	
NND	Huska Yopthomi	955	16.01%	
Independent	Luheto	322	5.40%	
Independent	Scato Botakha	235	3.94%	
Margin of victory		382	6.40%	−10.14%
Turnout		5,966	64.61%	−16.25%
Registered electors		9,451		40.26%
INC hold		Swing	-17.74%	

=== 1977 Assembly election ===
1977 Nagaland Legislative Assembly election: Zünheboto
Party	Candidate	Votes	%	±%
INC	Ghutoshe	2,514	47.19%	
NCN	Tokheho	1,633	30.66%	
UDA	Huska Yopthomi	1,180	22.15%	
Margin of victory		881	16.54%	10.88%
Turnout		5,327	80.85%	2.77%
Registered electors		6,738		5.99%
INC gain from Independent		Swing	9.22%	

=== 1974 Assembly election ===
1974 Nagaland Legislative Assembly election: Zünheboto
Party	Candidate	Votes	%	±%
Independent	Tokheho Sema	1,851	37.98%	
Independent	Ghutoshe Sema	1,575	32.31%	
NNO	Avito Kibami	1,448	29.71%	13.57%
Margin of victory		276	5.66%	−11.52%
Turnout		4,874	78.09%	−1.85%
Registered electors		6,357		11.10%
Independent hold		Swing	-9.90%	

=== 1969 Assembly election ===
1969 Nagaland Legislative Assembly election: Zünheboto
Party	Candidate	Votes	%	±%
Independent	Tokheho Sema	2,151	47.87%	
Independent	C. Zhenito Sema	1,379	30.69%	
NNO	Ghoito Sema	725	16.14%	
UDF	S. Vihoto Sheipu	238	5.30%	
Margin of victory		772	17.18%	7.09%
Turnout		4,493	79.94%	−7.65%
Registered electors		5,722		92.53%
Independent hold		Swing	-7.17%	

=== 1964 Assembly election ===
1964 Nagaland Legislative Assembly election: Zünheboto
Party	Candidate	Votes	%	±%
Independent	Kihoto	1,423	55.05%	
Independent	Tokheno	1,162	44.95%	
Margin of victory		261	10.10%	
Turnout		2,585	87.58%	
Registered electors		2,972		
Independent win (new seat)				

== See also ==
- List of constituencies of the Nagaland Legislative Assembly
- Zunheboto district
