= Tamlu Assembly constituency =

Legislative Assembly constituency in Nagaland State, India

Coordinates: 26.67°N 94.74°E

Tamlu
- Constituency No. 49 for the Nagaland Legislative Assembly

Constituency details
- Country: India
- Region: Northeast India
- State: Nagaland
- District: Longleng
- Lok Sabha constituency: Nagaland
- Established: 1974
- Total electors: 18,371
- Reservation: ST

Member of Legislative Assembly
- 14th Nagaland Legislative Assembly
- Incumbent B. Bangtick Phom
- Party: Independent
- Elected year: 2023

Tamlu is one of the 60 Legislative Assembly constituencies of Nagaland state in India.

It is part of Longleng district and is reserved for candidates belonging to the Scheduled Tribes.

== Members of the Legislative Assembly ==
Year	Member	Party
1974	Wokshing	United Democratic Alliance
1977	Bangjak Phom	Independent politician
1982	Bangjak Phom	Indian National Congress
1987	Bangjak Phom	Indian National Congress
1989	Pangjak S. Phom	Naga People's Front
1993	B. Phongshak Phom	Indian National Congress
1998	B. Phongshak Phom	Indian National Congress
2003	Nyemli Phom	Indian National Congress
2008	P. Dako Phom	Independent politician
2013	B. S. Nganlang Phom	Janata Dal
2018	B. S. Nganlang Phom	Naga People's Front
2023	B. Bangtick Phom	Independent politician

== Election results ==
=== 2023 Assembly election ===
2023 Nagaland Legislative Assembly election: Tamlu
Party	Candidate	Votes	%	±%
Independent	B. Bangtick Phom	8,646	51.15%	
NDPP	B. S. Nganlang Phom	7,952	47.04%	10.74%
RPI(A)	H. Nyemli Phom	259	1.53%	
NOTA	Nota	46	0.27%	
Margin of victory		694	4.11%	−2.08%
Turnout		16,903	92.01%	−2.20%
Registered electors		18,371		11.72%
Independent gain from NPF		Swing	8.66%	

=== 2018 Assembly election ===
2018 Nagaland Legislative Assembly election: Tamlu
Party	Candidate	Votes	%	±%
NPF	B. S. Nganlang Phom	6,582	42.49%	4.48%
NDPP	B. Phongshak Phom	5,624	36.30%	
Independent	W. Chingkam	3,162	20.41%	
AAP	P. Moigam Phom	47	0.30%	
NPP	B.P. Henveih Phom	40	0.26%	
NOTA	None of the Above	36	0.23%	
Margin of victory		958	6.18%	−7.04%
Turnout		15,491	94.20%	−4.02%
Registered electors		16,444		13.72%
NPF gain from JD(U)		Swing	-8.74%	

=== 2013 Assembly election ===
2013 Nagaland Legislative Assembly election: Tamlu
Party	Candidate	Votes	%	±%
JD(U)	B. S. Nganlang Phom	7,276	51.23%	
NPF	Nyemli Phom	5,398	38.01%	32.98%
INC	P. Dako Phom	1,025	7.22%	−31.56%
NCP	B. Longnyei Phom	58	0.41%	
Independent	B. Phongshak Phom	17	0.12%	
Margin of victory		1,878	13.22%	−1.56%
Turnout		14,203	98.22%	−1.39%
Registered electors		14,460		−56.80%
JD(U) gain from Independent		Swing	-2.33%	

=== 2008 Assembly election ===
2008 Nagaland Legislative Assembly election: Tamlu
Party	Candidate	Votes	%	±%
Independent	P. Dako Phom	17,860	53.56%	
INC	B. S. Nganlang Phom	12,932	38.78%	7.45%
NPF	Nyemli Phom	1,675	5.02%	−10.55%
RJD	M. Manohn	898	2.69%	
Margin of victory		4,928	14.78%	13.18%
Turnout		33,347	99.67%	−0.32%
Registered electors		33,475		11.16%
Independent gain from INC		Swing	22.23%	

=== 2003 Assembly election ===
2003 Nagaland Legislative Assembly election: Tamlu
Party	Candidate	Votes	%	±%
INC	Nyemli Phom	9,427	31.33%	−24.77%
NDM	B. Bangtick Phom	8,947	29.73%	
JD(U)	Phongshak	6,464	21.48%	
NPF	Nganlang	4,688	15.58%	
BJP	Shaupen	568	1.89%	
Margin of victory		480	1.60%	−10.60%
Turnout		30,094	99.94%	0.16%
Registered electors		30,113		11.35%
INC hold		Swing	-37.17%	

=== 1998 Assembly election ===
1998 Nagaland Legislative Assembly election: Tamlu
Party	Candidate	Votes	%	±%
INC	B. Phongshak Phom	15,120	56.10%	−12.40%
INC	Dr. O. Kongyan Phom	11,832	43.90%	−24.60%
Margin of victory		3,288	12.20%	−24.79%
Turnout		26,952	99.78%	−0.20%
Registered electors		27,044		32.20%
INC hold		Swing	-12.40%	

=== 1993 Assembly election ===
1993 Nagaland Legislative Assembly election: Tamlu
Party	Candidate	Votes	%	±%
INC	B. Phongshak Phom	14,000	68.50%	21.02%
NPF	H. Nyemli Phom	6,439	31.50%	−21.02%
Margin of victory		7,561	36.99%	31.95%
Turnout		20,439	99.99%	0.13%
Registered electors		20,457		205.69%
INC gain from NPF		Swing	15.98%	

=== 1989 Assembly election ===
1989 Nagaland Legislative Assembly election: Tamlu
Party	Candidate	Votes	%	±%
NPF	Pangjak S. Phom	3,501	52.52%	
INC	Bamgtick Phom	3,165	47.48%	−4.08%
Margin of victory		336	5.04%	1.27%
Turnout		6,666	99.85%	0.24%
Registered electors		6,692		−0.03%
NPF gain from INC		Swing	0.96%	

=== 1987 Assembly election ===
1987 Nagaland Legislative Assembly election: Tamlu
Party	Candidate	Votes	%	±%
INC	Bangjak Phom	3,434	51.56%	7.35%
NND	H. N. Yemliphom	3,183	47.79%	28.62%
NPP	Phongchekphom	43	0.65%	
Margin of victory		251	3.77%	−3.82%
Turnout		6,660	99.61%	1.58%
Registered electors		6,694		−37.39%
INC hold		Swing	7.35%	

=== 1982 Assembly election ===
1982 Nagaland Legislative Assembly election: Tamlu
Party	Candidate	Votes	%	±%
INC	Bangjak Phom	4,618	44.21%	
Independent	N. Wokshing Phom	3,825	36.62%	
NND	Ailong Phom	2,003	19.17%	
Margin of victory		793	7.59%	−17.98%
Turnout		10,446	98.04%	3.53%
Registered electors		10,691		49.71%
INC gain from Independent		Swing	-7.31%	

=== 1977 Assembly election ===
1977 Nagaland Legislative Assembly election: Tamlu
Party	Candidate	Votes	%	±%
Independent	Bangjak Phom	3,441	51.52%	
UDA	Ailong Phom	1,733	25.95%	−6.40%
Independent	N. Wokshing Phom	1,505	22.53%	
Margin of victory		1,708	25.57%	16.29%
Turnout		6,679	94.51%	3.73%
Registered electors		7,141		21.76%
Independent gain from UDA		Swing	19.17%	

=== 1974 Assembly election ===
1974 Nagaland Legislative Assembly election: Tamlu
Party	Candidate	Votes	%	±%
UDA	Wokshing	1,687	32.35%	
Independent	Bangjak Phom	1,203	23.07%	
NNO	T. Imdong	968	18.56%	
Independent	L. Ailong	542	10.39%	
Independent	K. C. Longli	471	9.03%	
Independent	Buchang Mansong	344	6.60%	
Margin of victory		484	9.28%	
Turnout		5,215	90.78%	
Registered electors		5,865		
UDA win (new seat)				

== See also ==
- List of constituencies of the Nagaland Legislative Assembly
- Longleng district
