= Dimapur II Assembly constituency =

Legislative Assembly constituency in Nagaland State, India

Coordinates: 25.85°N 93.71°E

Dimapur II
- Constituency No. 2 for the Nagaland Legislative Assembly

Constituency details
- Country: India
- Region: Northeast India
- State: Nagaland
- District: Dimapur
- Lok Sabha constituency: Nagaland
- Established: 1974
- Total electors: 58,627
- Reservation: ST

Member of Legislative Assembly
- 14th Nagaland Legislative Assembly
- Incumbent Moatoshi Longkumer
- Party: NPF
- Alliance: NDA
- Elected year: 2023

Dimapur II is one of the 60 Legislative Assembly constituencies of Nagaland state in India. It is part of Dimapur district and is reserved for candidates belonging to the Scheduled Tribes. It is also part of Nagaland Lok Sabha constituency.

== Members of the Legislative Assembly ==
Election	Member	Party
1974	Lhomithi Sema	Nagaland Nationalist Organisation
1977	I. Vikheshe	Indian National Congress
1982	I. Vikheshe	Indian National Congress
1987	Imtisunget Jamir	Independent politician
1989	Imtisunget Jamir	Indian National Congress
1993	S. I. Jamir	Indian National Congress
1998	Imtisunget Jamir	Indian National Congress
2003	Y. Hewoto Awomi	Naga People's Front
2008	S. I. Jamir	Indian National Congress
2013	S. I. Jamir	Indian National Congress
2018	Moatoshi Longkumer (Note: Elected as NDPP candidate in 2023 but merged with NPF in 2025.)	Naga People's Front
2023	Moatoshi Longkumer	Nationalist Democratic Progressive Party

== Election results ==
Vote share of winning candidates
2023	53.19%
2018	56.72%
2013	37.90%
2008	54.34%
2003	48.19%
1993	54.39%
1989	81.90%
1987	41.73%
1982	36.63%
1977	47.27%
1974	57.16%

=== Assembly Election 2023 ===
2023 Nagaland Legislative Assembly election: Dimapur II
Party	Candidate	Votes	%	±%
NDPP	Moatoshi Longkumer	23,856	53.19%	
LJP(RV)	Y. Vikheho Awomi	18,709	41.71%	
INC	S. Amento Chishi	1,784	3.98%	
NOTA	Nota	505	1.13%	−0.25%
Margin of victory		5,147	11.48%	−6.46%
Turnout		44,854	76.51%	2.36%
Registered electors		58,627		12.36%
NDPP gain from NPF		Swing	-3.53%	

=== Assembly Election 2018 ===
2018 Nagaland Legislative Assembly election: Dimapur II
Party	Candidate	Votes	%	±%
NPF	Moatoshi Longkumer	21,942	56.72%	28.22%
NDPP	Supulebten	15,003	38.78%	
AAP	Dr. S. Amos Lkr	1,211	3.13%	
NOTA	None of the Above	531	1.37%	
Margin of victory		6,939	17.94%	13.61%
Turnout		38,687	74.14%	−6.12%
Registered electors		52,179		12.17%
NPF gain from INC		Swing	18.81%	

=== Assembly Election 2013 ===
2013 Nagaland Legislative Assembly election: Dimapur II
Party	Candidate	Votes	%	±%
INC	S. I. Jamir	14,151	37.90%	−16.44%
Independent	Savi Liegise	12,536	33.58%	
NPF	Lipok	10,641	28.50%	−17.49%
Margin of victory		1,615	4.33%	−4.03%
Turnout		37,335	80.26%	5.38%
Registered electors		46,518		5.43%
INC hold		Swing	-16.44%	

=== Assembly Election 2008 ===
2008 Nagaland Legislative Assembly election: Dimapur II
Party	Candidate	Votes	%	±%
INC	S. I. Jamir	17,954	54.34%	8.87%
NPF	Savi Liegise	15,195	45.99%	−2.20%
Margin of victory		2,759	8.35%	5.64%
Turnout		33,038	75.13%	11.62%
Registered electors		44,124		−3.97%
INC gain from NPF		Swing	6.15%	

=== Assembly Election 2003 ===
2003 Nagaland Legislative Assembly election: Dimapur II
Party	Candidate	Votes	%	±%
NPF	Y. Hewoto Awomi	14,006	48.19%	
INC	Imtisunget Jamir	13,218	45.48%	
BJP	Konbemo	1,841	6.33%	
Margin of victory		788	2.71%	
Turnout		29,065	63.25%	−20.36%
Registered electors		45,950		−1.73%
NPF gain from INC		Swing	-6.20%	

=== Assembly Election 1998 ===
1998 Nagaland Legislative Assembly election: Dimapur II
Party	Candidate	Votes	%	±%
INC	Imtisunget Jamir	Unopposed		
Registered electors		46,761		35.08%
INC hold		Swing		

=== Assembly Election 1993 ===
1993 Nagaland Legislative Assembly election: Dimapur II
Party	Candidate	Votes	%	±%
INC	S. I. Jamir	15,385	54.39%	−27.51%
Independent	Golmei Patrick	10,939	38.67%	
NPF	Nceumo	1,964	6.94%	−11.16%
Margin of victory		4,446	15.72%	−48.09%
Turnout		28,288	83.62%	9.77%
Registered electors		34,616		10.72%
INC hold		Swing	-27.51%	

=== Assembly Election 1989 ===
1989 Nagaland Legislative Assembly election: Dimapur II
Party	Candidate	Votes	%	±%
INC	Imtisunget Jamir	18,468	81.90%	42.47%
NPF	Webansao	4,081	18.10%	
Margin of victory		14,387	63.80%	61.50%
Turnout		22,549	73.85%	10.22%
Registered electors		31,264		−7.19%
INC gain from Independent		Swing	40.17%	

=== Assembly Election 1987 ===
1987 Nagaland Legislative Assembly election: Dimapur II
Party	Candidate	Votes	%	±%
Independent	Imtisunget Jamir	8,763	41.73%	
INC	I. Vikheshe	8,280	39.43%	2.79%
Independent	Neisatuo Kiditsu	3,699	17.61%	
NND	Yehobi	258	1.23%	
Margin of victory		483	2.30%	−14.27%
Turnout		21,000	63.62%	19.45%
Registered electors		33,685		9.64%
Independent gain from INC		Swing	5.09%	

=== Assembly Election 1982 ===
1982 Nagaland Legislative Assembly election: Dimapur II
Party	Candidate	Votes	%	±%
INC	I. Vikheshe	4,854	36.63%	−10.63%
Independent	Lhomithi Sema	2,658	20.06%	
NND	Sabu Meruno	1,846	13.93%	
Independent	T. Sepong Imchen	1,241	9.37%	
Independent	Abemo Lotha	815	6.15%	
Independent	Lhomtoo	580	4.38%	
Independent	N. Vikielie Metha	542	4.09%	
Independent	N. Nungshi Imehan	402	3.03%	
Independent	Balidev Sahay Sharmal	171	1.29%	
Independent	N. Hotongse Sangtam	141	1.06%	
Margin of victory		2,196	16.57%	8.36%
Turnout		13,250	44.17%	−17.69%
Registered electors		30,722		156.08%
INC hold		Swing	-10.63%	

=== Assembly Election 1977 ===
1977 Nagaland Legislative Assembly election: Dimapur II
Party	Candidate	Votes	%	±%
INC	I. Vikheshe	3,406	47.27%	
UDA	Neisatuo Kiditsu	2,814	39.05%	
NCN	Ihezhe	986	13.68%	
Margin of victory		592	8.22%	−15.38%
Turnout		7,206	61.86%	12.39%
Registered electors		11,997		−10.70%
INC gain from NNO		Swing	-9.89%	

=== Assembly Election 1974 ===
1974 Nagaland Legislative Assembly election: Dimapur II
Party	Candidate	Votes	%	±%
NNO	Lhomithi Sema	3,689	57.16%	
UDA	Neisatuo Kiditsu	2,166	33.56%	
Independent	Iqbaljit Singh	599	9.28%	
Margin of victory		1,523	23.60%	
Turnout		6,454	49.46%	
Registered electors		13,434		
NNO win (new seat)				

== See also ==
- List of constituencies of the Nagaland Legislative Assembly
- Dimapur district
- Dimapur
- Nagaland (Lok Sabha constituency)
