= Mon Town Assembly constituency =

Legislative Assembly constituency in Nagaland State, India

Coordinates: 26.72°N 95.03°E

Mon Town
- Constituency No. 46 for the Nagaland Legislative Assembly

Constituency details
- Country: India
- Region: Northeast India
- State: Nagaland
- District: Mon
- Lok Sabha constituency: Nagaland
- Established: 1974
- Total electors: 20,347
- Reservation: ST

Member of Legislative Assembly
- 14th Nagaland Legislative Assembly
- Incumbent Y. Mankhao Konyak
- Party: NPF
- Alliance: NDA
- Elected year: 2023

Mon Town is one of the 60 Legislative Assembly constituencies of Nagaland state in India.

It is part of Mon district and is reserved for candidates belonging to the Scheduled Tribes.

== Members of the Legislative Assembly ==
Year	Member	Party
1974	Tingnei Koynak	Nagaland Nationalist Organisation
1977	L. Metna	Independent politician
1982	Yoktin Konyak	Independent politician
1987	S. Yokten	Indian National Congress
1989	S. Yokten	Naga People's Front
1993	S. Yokten	Indian National Congress
1998	C. John	Independent politician
2003	Chingwang	Indian National Congress
2008	Chingwang	Indian National Congress
2013	N. Thongwang Konyak	Naga People's Front
2018	N. Thongwang Konyak	Naga People's Front
2023	Y. Mankhao Konyak	Nationalist Congress Party

== Election results ==
=== 2023 Assembly election ===
2023 Nagaland Legislative Assembly election: Mon Town
Party	Candidate	Votes	%	±%
NCP	Y. Mankhao Konyak	10,870	56.71%	
BJP	Er. Cheong Konyak	8,259	43.09%	
NOTA	None Of the above	38	0.20%	
Margin of victory		2,611	13.62%	13.45%
Turnout		19,167	94.20%	4.31%
Registered electors		20,347		12.05%
NCP gain from NPF		Swing	23.45%	

=== 2018 Assembly election ===
2018 Nagaland Legislative Assembly election: Mon Town
Party	Candidate	Votes	%	±%
NPF	N. Thongwang Konyak	5,429	33.26%	−4.04%
NDPP	Y. Mankhao Konyak	5,401	33.09%	
NPP	Er. Cheong Konyak	5,003	30.65%	
INC	Hawang T. Wangsha	378	2.32%	−33.49%
NOTA	None of the Above	113	0.69%	
Margin of victory		28	0.17%	−1.32%
Turnout		16,324	89.89%	−2.56%
Registered electors		18,159		−8.86%
NPF hold		Swing	-4.04%	

=== 2013 Assembly election ===
2013 Nagaland Legislative Assembly election: Mon Town
Party	Candidate	Votes	%	±%
NPF	N. Thongwang Konyak	6,870	37.29%	−3.88%
INC	Y. Mankhao Konyak	6,596	35.81%	−23.71%
Independent	P. Cheong	4,950	26.87%	
Margin of victory		274	1.49%	−16.86%
Turnout		18,421	92.45%	8.22%
Registered electors		19,925		−3.16%
NPF gain from INC		Swing	-22.23%	

=== 2008 Assembly election ===
2008 Nagaland Legislative Assembly election: Mon Town
Party	Candidate	Votes	%	±%
INC	Chingwang	10,316	59.52%	15.24%
NPF	N. Thongwang Konyak	7,136	41.17%	8.09%
RJD	Phongnyei	333	1.92%	
Margin of victory		3,180	18.35%	7.16%
Turnout		17,332	86.44%	0.29%
Registered electors		20,576		32.08%
INC hold		Swing	15.24%	

=== 2003 Assembly election ===
2003 Nagaland Legislative Assembly election: Mon Town
Party	Candidate	Votes	%	±%
INC	Chingwang	5,701	44.28%	−4.47%
NPF	S. Yokten	4,260	33.09%	
Independent	C. John	1,596	12.40%	
NDM	Khoiwang	899	6.98%	
BJP	L. Tongnyei	419	3.25%	
Margin of victory		1,441	11.19%	8.69%
Turnout		12,875	83.95%	−12.08%
Registered electors		15,579		8.12%
INC gain from Independent		Swing	-11.49%	

=== 1998 Assembly election ===
1998 Nagaland Legislative Assembly election: Mon Town
Party	Candidate	Votes	%	±%
Independent	C. John	6,988	51.25%	
INC	N. Thongwang Konyak	6,647	48.75%	−7.02%
Margin of victory		341	2.50%	−9.04%
Turnout		13,635	96.02%	11.46%
Registered electors		14,409		−6.56%
Independent gain from INC		Swing	-4.52%	

=== 1993 Assembly election ===
1993 Nagaland Legislative Assembly election: Mon Town
Party	Candidate	Votes	%	±%
INC	S. Yokten	7,212	55.77%	6.09%
NPF	John Konyak	5,720	44.23%	−6.09%
Margin of victory		1,492	11.54%	10.89%
Turnout		12,932	84.56%	−3.77%
Registered electors		15,421		29.36%
INC gain from NPF		Swing	5.45%	

=== 1989 Assembly election ===
1989 Nagaland Legislative Assembly election: Mon Town
Party	Candidate	Votes	%	±%
NPF	S. Yokten	5,248	50.32%	
INC	John Konyak	5,181	49.68%	−12.33%
Margin of victory		67	0.64%	−30.93%
Turnout		10,429	88.33%	−0.59%
Registered electors		11,921		−0.04%
NPF gain from INC		Swing	-11.69%	

=== 1987 Assembly election ===
1987 Nagaland Legislative Assembly election: Mon Town
Party	Candidate	Votes	%	±%
INC	S. Yokten	6,492	62.01%	40.37%
NND	K. Tingnei	3,187	30.44%	10.63%
BJP	L. Yanlong	790	7.55%	
Margin of victory		3,305	31.57%	23.04%
Turnout		10,469	88.92%	2.17%
Registered electors		11,926		55.33%
INC gain from Independent		Swing	31.85%	

=== 1982 Assembly election ===
1982 Nagaland Legislative Assembly election: Mon Town
Party	Candidate	Votes	%	±%
Independent	Yoktin Konyak	1,981	30.17%	
INC	Hoka	1,421	21.64%	0.00%
NND	Kamzei Konyak	1,301	19.81%	
Independent	Tingnei Koynak	1,127	17.16%	
Independent	Methana Konyak	737	11.22%	
Margin of victory		560	8.53%	−11.31%
Turnout		6,567	86.75%	9.48%
Registered electors		7,678		1.57%
Independent hold		Swing	-11.31%	

=== 1977 Assembly election ===
1977 Nagaland Legislative Assembly election: Mon Town
Party	Candidate	Votes	%	±%
Independent	L. Metna	2,386	41.47%	
INC	Chaying	1,245	21.64%	
UDA	N. Y. Atinck Konyak	996	17.31%	−13.01%
NCN	Kamzei Konyak	884	15.37%	
Independent	Watikumba	242	4.21%	
Margin of victory		1,141	19.83%	9.44%
Turnout		5,753	77.27%	−6.91%
Registered electors		7,559		25.86%
Independent gain from NNO		Swing	0.75%	

=== 1974 Assembly election ===
1974 Nagaland Legislative Assembly election: Mon Town
Party	Candidate	Votes	%	±%
NNO	Tingnei Koynak	2,017	40.72%	
UDA	Methana Konyak	1,502	30.33%	
Independent	Chaying	1,434	28.95%	
Margin of victory		515	10.40%	
Turnout		4,953	84.18%	
Registered electors		6,006		
NNO win (new seat)				

== See also ==
- List of constituencies of the Nagaland Legislative Assembly
- Mon district
