= Y. Mankhao Konyak =

Indian politician (born 1981)

Y. Mankhao Konyak (born 1981) is an Indian politician from Nagaland. He is an MLA from the Mon Town Assembly constituency, which is reserved for Scheduled Tribe community, in Mon district. He won the 2023 Nagaland Legislative Assembly election, representing the Nationalist Congress Party. He, along with 6 other NCP MLA's, joined the NDPP (now NPF) in 2025.

== Early life and education ==
Konyak is from Mon Town, Mon District, Nagaland. He is the son of Yeangpong Konyak. He completed his B.A. in 2004 at a college affiliated with Nagaland University.

== Career ==
Konyak won the Mon Town constituency representing the Nationalist Congress Party (NCP) in the 2023 Nagaland assembly election. He polled 10,870 votes and defeated his nearest rival, Cheong Konyak of the Bharatiya Janata Party, by 2,611 votes. On 19 February 2024, a petition seeking his disqualification, along with other NCP members, was turned down by the speaker. In the 2018 Nagaland assembly election he lost to N. Thongwang Konyak of the Naga People's Front by only 28 votes.He joined NDPP in 2025.
