= K. Tokugha Sukhalu =

Indian politician

K. Tokugha Sukhalu (born 1955) is an Indian politician from Nagaland. He is an MLA from the Zunheboto Assembly constituency, which is reserved for Scheduled Tribe community, in Zunheboto district. He won the 2023 Nagaland Legislative Assembly election, representing the Nationalist Democratic Progressive Party. He is an advisor to the Nagaland chief minister, on food and civil supply, and legal metrology.

== Early life and education ==
Sukhalu is from Zunheboto, Nagaland. He is the son of the late Kawoto. He completed his M.A. in 1977 at North Eastern Hill University, Shillong. He was formerly with the Indian Administrative Service.

== Career ==
Sukhalu won the Zunheboto constituency representing the Nationalist Democratic Progressive Party in the 2023 Nagaland assembly election. He polled 15,921 votes and defeated his nearest rival, Akavi Sumi of the Naga People's Front, by a margin of 3,061 votes. Earlier in 2021, he was advisor to the chief minister on school education.
