= Wakching Assembly constituency =

Legislative Assembly constituency in Nagaland, India

Coordinates: 26.7°N 94.89°E

Wakching
- Constituency No. 42 for the Nagaland Legislative Assembly

Constituency details
- Country: India
- Region: Northeast India
- State: Nagaland
- District: Mon
- Lok Sabha constituency: Nagaland
- Established: 1974
- Total electors: 16,313
- Reservation: ST

Member of Legislative Assembly
- 14th Nagaland Legislative Assembly
- Incumbent W. Chingang Konyak
- Party: NPF
- Alliance: NDA
- Elected year: 2023

Wakching is one of the 60 Legislative Assembly constituencies of Nagaland state in India.

It is part of Mon district and is reserved for candidates belonging to the Scheduled Tribes.

== Members of the Legislative Assembly ==
Year	Member	Party
1974	Chingwang Konyak	Nagaland Nationalist Organisation
1977	Chingwang Konyak	Indian National Congress
1980 by-election	P. Enyei	Independent politician
1982	P. Ehyol	Indian National Congress
1987	Chingwang Konyak	Indian National Congress
1989	Chingwang Konyak	Indian National Congress
1993	P. Enyei	Naga People's Front
1998	P. Enyei Konyak	Indian National Congress
2003	M. C. Konyak	Bharatiya Janata Party
2008	M. C. Konyak	Bharatiya Janata Party
2013	Y. M. Yollow Konyak	Independent politician
2018	Y. M. Yollow Konyak	Naga People's Front
2023	W. Chingang Konyak	Nationalist Democratic Progressive Party

== Election results ==
=== 2023 Assembly election ===
2023 Nagaland Legislative Assembly election: Wakching
Party	Candidate	Votes	%	±%
NDPP	W. Chingang Konyak	9,166	58.56%	15.20%
NPP	M. Honang Jess	6,433	41.10%	
NOTA	Nota	52	0.33%	
Margin of victory		2,733	17.46%	4.81%
Turnout		15,651	95.94%	2.35%
Registered electors		16,313		9.54%
NDPP gain from NPF		Swing	2.55%	

=== 2018 Assembly election ===
2018 Nagaland Legislative Assembly election: Wakching
Party	Candidate	Votes	%	±%
NPF	Y. M. Yollow Konyak	7,808	56.02%	10.98%
NDPP	M. C. Konyak	6,044	43.36%	
NOTA	None of the Above	86	0.62%	
Margin of victory		1,764	12.66%	2.75%
Turnout		13,938	93.59%	−1.74%
Registered electors		14,892		−22.48%
NPF gain from Independent		Swing	1.07%	

=== 2013 Assembly election ===
2013 Nagaland Legislative Assembly election: Wakching
Party	Candidate	Votes	%	±%
Independent	Y. M. Yollow Konyak	10,063	54.95%	
NPF	M. C. Konyak	8,248	45.04%	
Margin of victory		1,815	9.91%	3.29%
Turnout		18,314	95.33%	−1.43%
Registered electors		19,211		−2.57%
Independent gain from BJP		Swing	15.76%	

=== 2008 Assembly election ===
2008 Nagaland Legislative Assembly election: Wakching
Party	Candidate	Votes	%	±%
BJP	M. C. Konyak	7,476	39.18%	−12.82%
INC	Yona	6,213	32.56%	−15.44%
RJD	P. Enyei	5,539	29.03%	
Margin of victory		1,263	6.62%	2.62%
Turnout		19,080	97.51%	4.61%
Registered electors		19,718		60.24%
BJP hold		Swing	-12.82%	

=== 2003 Assembly election ===
2003 Nagaland Legislative Assembly election: Wakching
Party	Candidate	Votes	%	±%
BJP	M. C. Konyak	5,859	52.00%	
INC	P. Enyei Konyak	5,408	48.00%	
Margin of victory		451	4.00%	
Turnout		11,267	92.16%	92.16%
Registered electors		12,305		2.63%
BJP gain from INC		Swing	1.23%	

=== 1998 Assembly election ===
1998 Nagaland Legislative Assembly election: Wakching
Party	Candidate	Votes	%	±%
INC	P. Enyei Konyak	Unopposed		
Registered electors		11,990		−17.46%
INC gain from NPF		Swing		

=== 1993 Assembly election ===
1993 Nagaland Legislative Assembly election: Wakching
Party	Candidate	Votes	%	±%
NPF	P. Enyei	7,251	50.77%	1.00%
INC	Chingwang Konyak	6,839	47.89%	−2.34%
BJP	Shanglow	192	1.34%	
Margin of victory		412	2.88%	2.43%
Turnout		14,282	98.53%	4.89%
Registered electors		14,527		39.07%
NPF gain from INC		Swing	0.54%	

=== 1989 Assembly election ===
1989 Nagaland Legislative Assembly election: Wakching
Party	Candidate	Votes	%	±%
INC	Chingwang Konyak	4,853	50.23%	−6.02%
NPF	P. Enyei	4,809	49.77%	
Margin of victory		44	0.46%	−12.04%
Turnout		9,662	93.63%	4.98%
Registered electors		10,446		−0.07%
INC hold		Swing	-6.02%	

=== 1987 Assembly election ===
1987 Nagaland Legislative Assembly election: Wakching
Party	Candidate	Votes	%	±%
INC	Chingwang Konyak	5,151	56.25%	12.60%
NND	P. Enyei	4,007	43.75%	13.76%
Margin of victory		1,144	12.49%	−1.16%
Turnout		9,158	88.65%	−4.99%
Registered electors		10,453		34.20%
INC hold		Swing	12.60%	

=== 1982 Assembly election ===
1982 Nagaland Legislative Assembly election: Wakching
Party	Candidate	Votes	%	±%
INC	P. Ehyol	3,123	43.65%	
NND	A. Shangkem Konyak	2,146	29.99%	
Independent	Hendok Konyak	1,886	26.36%	
Margin of victory		977	13.65%	
Turnout		7,155	93.64%	1. DIV/0!
Registered electors		7,789		
INC gain from Independent		Swing		

=== 1980 Assembly by-election ===
1980 Nagaland Legislative Assembly by-election: Wakching
Party	Candidate	Votes	%	±%
Independent	P. Enyei	3,417		
INC(I)	S. Konyak	3,408		
Margin of victory		9		
Independent gain from INC		Swing		

=== 1977 Assembly election ===
1977 Nagaland Legislative Assembly election: Wakching
Party	Candidate	Votes	%	±%
INC	Chingwang Konyak	2,397	38.85%	
UDA	P. Enyei	2,240	36.30%	8.34%
Independent	A. Shangkem Konyak	1,533	24.85%	
Margin of victory		157	2.54%	−32.40%
Turnout		6,170	86.88%	−1.22%
Registered electors		7,246		37.81%
INC gain from NNO		Swing	-24.06%	

=== 1974 Assembly election ===
1974 Nagaland Legislative Assembly election: Wakching
Party	Candidate	Votes	%	±%
NNO	Chingwang Konyak	2,814	62.91%	
UDA	Shaopa	1,251	27.97%	
Independent	Thanglong Konyak	408	9.12%	
Margin of victory		1,563	34.94%	
Turnout		4,473	88.09%	1. VALUE!
Registered electors		5,258		
NNO win (new seat)				

== See also ==
- List of constituencies of the Nagaland Legislative Assembly
- Mon district
