= Rokonicha Kuotsü =

Indian politician

Personal details
- Born: 1946 Tsepama
- Died: 17 April 2019 (aged 72–73)

Rokonicha Kuotsü (1946 – 2019) was an Indian politician from Nagaland. He served as the Minister of State for Local Self Government and Wastelands in the Nagaland state government.

== Early life ==
Rokonicha was born in 1946 at Tsepama village. He studied at Piphema GMS and Government High School in Kohima. He graduated from St. Edmund's College, Shillong in 1970. He served as an assistant teacher at Rüzhükhrie Government Higher Secondary School in Kohima for three years.

He led several civil society organisations in Nagaland. He was the president of the Chakhroma Students' Union from 1967-69. He was the joint secretary and later, president of the Angami Public Organisation.

== Political career ==
He was first elected to the Nagaland Legislative Assembly from the Ghaspani-2 constituency in the 1974 on a United Democratic Front ticket. He also won the 1977, 1982, 1987, 1998 and 2003 elections, representing various parties.

He was elected the deputy speaker of the Nagaland Legislative Assembly in 1975.

In 2008, he lost the seat to Kihoto Hollohon. Rokonicha got 6661 votes (28.54%). Rokonicha contested as a Naga People's Front candidate.

== Death ==
After prolonged illness, Kuotsü died on 17 April 2019 in his residence at Medziphema at the age of 73. He was survived by his wife Soneiü, three daughters and three sons.
