= B. Bangtick Phom =

Indian politician (born 1961)

B. Bangtick Phom (born 1961) is an Indian politician from Nagaland. He is an MLA from Tamlu Assembly constituency, which is reserved for Scheduled Tribes, in Longleng District. He won the 2023 Nagaland Legislative Assembly election, as an independent politician.

== Early life and education ==
Phom is from Tamlu, Longleng District, Nagaland.He is the son of Bongnyei Phom. He completed his Class 10 in 1981. His wife is in government service and works as a lab technician.

== Career ==
Phom won the Tamlu Assembly constituency as an independent candidate in the 2023 Nagaland Legislative Assembly election. He polled 8,646 votes and defeated his nearest rival and sitting MLA, B. S. Nganlang Phom of the Nationalist Democratic Progressive Party, by a margin of 694 votes.
