= P. Longon =

Indian politician

Puthai Longon (born 1961) is an Indian politician from Nagaland. He is a four-time MLA from the Noklak Assembly constituency, which is reserved for Scheduled Tribe community, in Noklak district. He won the 2023 Nagaland Legislative Assembly election, representing the Nationalist Congress Party. He also served as a minister for 15 years and returned to electoral politics after a gap of five years in 2023.

== Early life and education ==
Longon is from Noklak, Nagaland. He is the son of the late Puthai. He completed his B.A. in 1987 at Patkai College, North Eastern Hill University.

== Career ==
Longon was elected from the Noklak Assembly constituency representing the Nationalist Congress Party in the 2023 Nagaland Legislative Assembly election. He polled 8,482 votes and defeated his nearest rival and sitting MLA, H. Haiying of the Bharatiya Janata Party, by a margin of 734 votes.

He first became an MLA winning the 2003 Nagaland assembly election representing the Naga People's Front. In 2003, he polled 5,736 votes and defeated his nearest rival, Sedem Khaming of the Indian National Congress, by a margin of 943 votes. He retained the seat for the NPF, winning the 2008 Nagaland Legislative Assembly election, where he defeated Khaming again, by 5,772 votes. He won for a third consecutive term in the 2013 Nagaland Legislative Assembly election. In 2013, he polled 9,168 and defeated the Indian National Congress candidate, H. Haiying, by 3,305 votes.

However, in the 2018 Nagaland Legislative Assembly election, he lost as an NPF candidate to Haiying, who contested this time on the Bharatiya Janata Party ticket. He regained the seat, winning the 2023 Assembly election after joining the Nationalist Congress Party and became an MLA for the fourth time.
