= W. Chingang Konyak =

Indian politician

W. Chingang Konyak (born 1963) is an Indian politician from Nagaland. He is an MLA from the Wakching Assembly constituency, which is reserved for Scheduled Tribe community, in Mon district. He won the 2023 Nagaland Legislative Assembly election, representing the Naga People's Front.

== Early life and education ==
Konyak is from Wakching, Mon District, Nagaland. He is the son of P. Weching Konyak. He completed his graduation in 1992 at Dimapur. His wife is a government employee.

== Career ==
Konyak won the Wakching constituency representing the Nationalist Democratic Progressive Party in the 2023 Nagaland assembly election. He polled 9,166 votes and defeated his nearest rival, M. Honang Jess of the National People's Party, by 2,733 votes.
