= C. L. John =

Indian politician

C. L. John (born 1966) is an Indian politician from Nagaland. He is a four-time MLA from the Tehok Assembly constituency, which is reserved for Scheduled Tribes, in Mon District. He won the 2023 Nagaland Legislative Assembly election, representing the Nationalist Democratic Progressive Party. He is the minister of Environment, Forests and Climate Change.

== Early life and education ==
John is from Tehok, Mon District, Nagaland. He is the son of Cheno Konyak. He studied Class 8 at Government High School, Mon, and passed the examinations conducted by Nagaland Board of School Education in 1985. His wife was in government service and retired from the education department.

== Career ==
John was elected from the Tehok Assembly constituency representing the Nationalist Democratic Progressive Party in the 2023 Nagaland Legislative Assembly election. He polled 9,232 votes and defeated his nearest rival, C. Kawang Konyak of the Naga People's Front, by a margin of 7,070 votes. He first became an MLA in the 2008 Nagaland Legislative Assembly election, representing Naga People's Front. In 2008, he polled 7,829 votes and defeated his nearest rival, Shaboh of the Indian National Congress, by a margin of 1,403 votes. He retained the seat for the NPF, winning the 2013 Nagaland Legislative Assembly election defeating W. Wongyuh Konyak of the Congress Party, by a margin of 7,891 votes. He won for the third consecutive time in the 2018 Assembly election defeating C. Kawang Konyak of the Bharatiya Janata Party, by a margin of 4,556 votes. Later, he shifted to the Nationalist Democratic Progressive Party and won the 2023 Assembly election. He joined the Naga People's Front when it was merged with the NDPP.
