= Kiyanilie Peseyie =

Indian politician

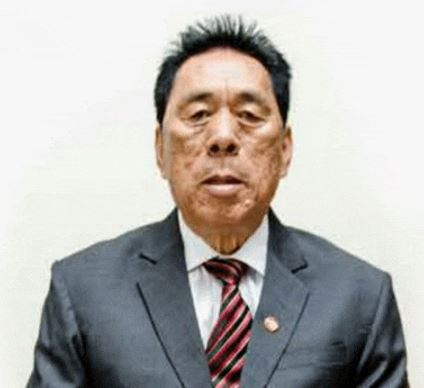
- Veteran Politician from Nagaland

Speaker of Nagaland Legislative Assembly
- In office 14 March 2003 – 15 March 2013
- Preceded by: Z. Lohe
- Succeeded by: Chotisüh Sazo

Member of Nagaland Legislative Assembly
- In office 2003–2017
- Preceded by: Asu Keyho
- Succeeded by: Keneizhakho Nakhro
- Constituency: Western Angami

Personal details
- Born: Kiyanilie Peseyie; 1 August 1941 Nagaland
- Died: 27 September 2017 (aged 76) Dimapur, Nagaland, India
- Party: Naga People's Front

Kiyanilie Peseyie (1 August 1941 – 27 September 2017) was a politician from Nagaland, India who served as the speaker of the Nagaland Legislative Assembly.

== Early life ==
In the year 1941 Kiyanilie was born to Siecha and Lhourhino Peseyie of Jotsoma village. He completed his school studies in Jotsoma and Dimapur. In 1970 he graduated from Gauhati University. He joined the Government of Nagaland's Department of Excise in 1971. At the age of 62, a few years before mandated retirement, Peseyie retired voluntarily exiting the department as the Additional Commissioner. He then joined electoral politics.

== Political career ==
Peseyie won the Western Angami seat (ST) in the 2003 state election as the Naga People's Front candidate. He defeated his nearest rival, Asu Keyho of the Indian National Congress (INC), by a margin of 966 votes against. After the election, he was elected as Speaker of the Legislative Assembly.

He retained his constituency in the 2008 election, and was then elected Speaker for a second term.

In 2013 he was made the Minister for Public Health and Engineering after retaining his constituency for a third time. However, in a minor reshuffle he was made the minister for Social Security & Welfare Department and Parliamentary Affairs. He was also appointed as the Chief Whip of the Naga People’s Front. He was the first person from North East India to be appointed as an executive member of the Commonwealth Parliamentary Association.

== Death ==
He died on 27 September 2017 around 2.30 A.M. at Zion Hospital Dimapur after a brief illness. On 28 September, he was laid to rest in Jotsoma village with full state honors.
