= H. Khekiho Zhimomi =

Indian politician

H. Khekiho Zhimomi (19 February 1946 – 26 November 2015) was a politician from Nagaland, India. He was first elected to the Nagaland Legislative Assembly in 1989, then again in 1993 and again in 2003 as the Naga People's Front candidate in the constituency Ghaspani-I (ST). He served as a member of the Rajya Sabha (upper house of the Parliament of India) from 2008 till his death in 2015.

He was first elected to the Nagaland Legislative Assembly in 1989. He was appointed Cabinet Minister in charge of Industries and Commerce in the Nagaland People's Council Government headed by Chief Minister Vamuzo Phesao in 1990. He was a successful industrialist of Zhimomi group of industries. He opened the first Pepsi factory in North-East India in 1992 and Nagaland's first packaged drinking water VIVA in 2002.

== Personal life ==
Zhimomi was married to Khezheli. Together they had six daughters and two sons.

His son-in-law, Anato Zhimomi, was arrested in 2016 in a money laundering case. Anato was one of the founding members of the NGO YouthNet Nagaland and has studied at London School of Economics, Regent Business School, and University of California, Berkeley.

On 26 November 2015, Zhimomi died following a stroke at All India Institutes of Medical Sciences, Delhi where he was admitted three days ago. He was 69. His body was airlifted to Dimapur by a chartered plane for funeral on the following day.
