= List of constituencies of the Nagaland Legislative Assembly =

Legislative Assembly of Nagaland

Type
- Type: Unicameral
- Term limits: 5 years
- Seats: 60

Elections
- Voting system: First past the post
- Last election: 27 February 2023
- Next election: TBD

Meeting place
- Nagaland Legislative Assembly, Kohima, Nagaland 797001

Website
- Nagaland Legislative Assembly

Assembly constituencies of Nagaland

The Nagaland Legislative Assembly is the unicameral legislature of the Indian state of Nagaland. The seat of the Legislative Assembly is at Kohima, the capital of the state. The term of the Legislative Assembly is five years, unless it is dissolved earlier. Presently, it comprises 60 members who are directly elected from single-seat constituencies.

== History ==
Nagaland became a state of India on 1 December 1963, and after elections in January, 1964, the first Nagaland Legislative Assembly was formed, on 11 February 1964. In 1974, the strength of the Legislative assembly was increased from 40, to the present strength of 60 members.

== Constituencies ==
Reservation
Scheduled Tribes (ST)

Constituencies of the Nagaland Legislative Assembly
#	Constituency name	Reserved for (ST/None)	District	Lok Sabha Constituency	Electors (2023)
1	Dimapur I	None	Dimapur	Nagaland	25,244
2	Dimapur II	Scheduled Tribes	Dimapur	Nagaland	58,627
3	Dimapur III	Scheduled Tribes	Dimapur	Nagaland	38,045
4	Ghaspani I	Scheduled Tribes	Chümoukedima and Niuland	Nagaland	75,372
5	Ghaspani II	Scheduled Tribes	Chümoukedima	Nagaland	29,435
6	Tening	Scheduled Tribes	Peren	Nagaland	27,405
7	Peren	Scheduled Tribes	Peren	Nagaland	32,266
8	Western Angami	Scheduled Tribes	Kohima	Nagaland	17,594
9	Kohima Town	Scheduled Tribes	Kohima	Nagaland	31,767
10	Northern Angami I	Scheduled Tribes	Kohima	Nagaland	17,860
11	Northern Angami II	Scheduled Tribes	Kohima	Nagaland	21,840
12	Tseminyü	Scheduled Tribes	Tseminyü	Nagaland	24,253
13	Pughoboto	Scheduled Tribes	Zünheboto	Nagaland	15,803
14	Southern Angami I	Scheduled Tribes	Kohima	Nagaland	14,482
15	Southern Angami II	Scheduled Tribes	Kohima	Nagaland	17,808
16	Pfütsero	Scheduled Tribes	Phek	Nagaland	20,805
17	Chizami	Scheduled Tribes	Phek	Nagaland	17,676
18	Chozuba	Scheduled Tribes	Phek	Nagaland	25,714
19	Phek	Scheduled Tribes	Phek	Nagaland	22,122
20	Meluri	Scheduled Tribes	Phek	Nagaland	20,851
21	Tuli	Scheduled Tribes	Mokokchung	Nagaland	18,636
22	Arkakong	Scheduled Tribes	Mokokchung	Nagaland	19,479
23	Impur	Scheduled Tribes	Mokokchung	Nagaland	13,737
24	Angetyongpang	Scheduled Tribes	Mokokchung	Nagaland	17,946
25	Mongoya	Scheduled Tribes	Mokokchung	Nagaland	17,448
26	Aonglenden	Scheduled Tribes	Mokokchung	Nagaland	12,491
27	Mokokchung Town	Scheduled Tribes	Mokokchung	Nagaland	8,252
28	Koridang	Scheduled Tribes	Mokokchung	Nagaland	21,740
29	Jangpetkong	Scheduled Tribes	Mokokchung	Nagaland	12,861
30	Alongtaki	Scheduled Tribes	Mokokchung	Nagaland	16,007
31	Akuluto	Scheduled Tribes	Zünheboto	Nagaland	10,725
32	Atoizu	Scheduled Tribes	Zünheboto	Nagaland	16,627
33	Suruhoto	Scheduled Tribes	Zünheboto	Nagaland	16,057
34	Aghunato	Scheduled Tribes	Zünheboto	Nagaland	16,040
35	Zünheboto	Scheduled Tribes	Zünheboto	Nagaland	23,021
36	Satakha	Scheduled Tribes	Zünheboto	Nagaland	18,439
37	Tyüi	Scheduled Tribes	Wokha	Nagaland	25,750
38	Wokha	Scheduled Tribes	Wokha	Nagaland	31,252
39	Sanis	Scheduled Tribes	Wokha	Nagaland	24,051
40	Bhandari	Scheduled Tribes	Wokha	Nagaland	26,957
41	Tizit	Scheduled Tribes	Mon	Nagaland	20,696
42	Wakching	Scheduled Tribes	Mon	Nagaland	16,313
43	Tapi	Scheduled Tribes	Mon	Nagaland	15,220
44	Phomching	Scheduled Tribes	Mon	Nagaland	17,455
45	Tehok	Scheduled Tribes	Mon	Nagaland	12,209
46	Mon Town	Scheduled Tribes	Mon	Nagaland	20,347
47	Aboi	Scheduled Tribes	Mon	Nagaland	13,589
48	Moka	Scheduled Tribes	Mon	Nagaland	18,039
49	Tamlu	Scheduled Tribes	Longleng	Nagaland	18,371
50	Longleng	Scheduled Tribes	Longleng	Nagaland	30,616
51	Noksen	Scheduled Tribes	Tuensang	Nagaland	12,455
52	Longkhim Chare	Scheduled Tribes	Tuensang	Nagaland	22,176
53	Tuensang Sadar I	Scheduled Tribes	Tuensang	Nagaland	23,618
54	Tuensang Sadar II	Scheduled Tribes	Tuensang	Nagaland	16,671
55	Tobu	Scheduled Tribes	Mon	Nagaland	21,633
56	Noklak	Scheduled Tribes	Noklak	Nagaland	17,924
57	Thonoknyu	Scheduled Tribes	Noklak	Nagaland	20,830
58	Shamator–Chessore	Scheduled Tribes	Shamator	Nagaland	18,788
59	Seyochung–Sitimi	Scheduled Tribes	Kiphire	Nagaland	24,166
60	Pungro–Kiphire	Scheduled Tribes	Kiphire	Nagaland	32,463
