= Hekani Jakhalu Kense =

Indian politician and social entrepreneur

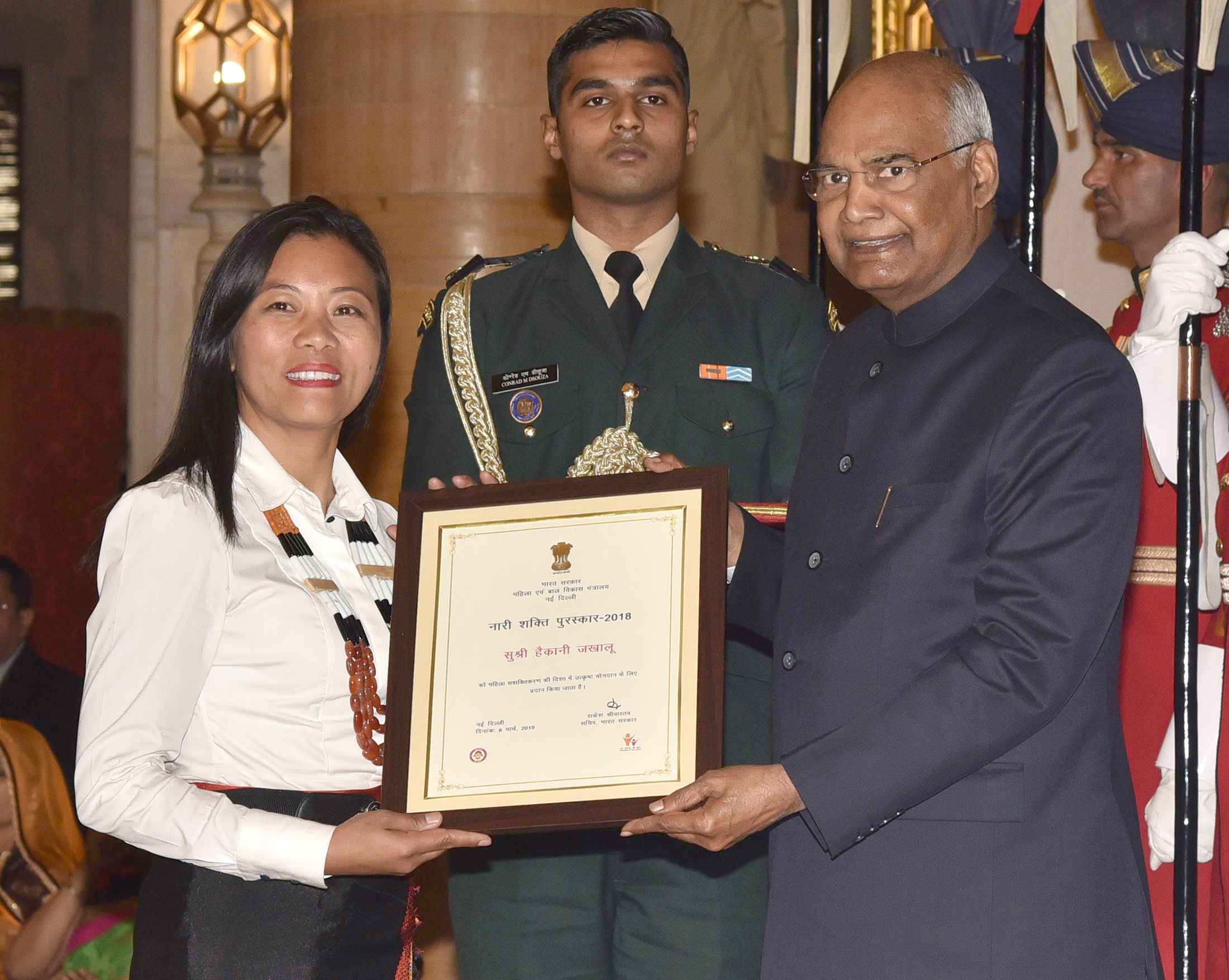
- Hekani Jakhalu receiving the 2018 Nari Shakti Puruskar award

Member of the Nagaland Legislative Assembly
- Incumbent
- Assumed office 2 March 2023
- Preceded by: Azheto Zhimomi
- Constituency: Dimapur III

Personal details
- Born: Hekani Jakhalu; 1976 (age 50–49) Toluvi, Dimapur, Nagaland
- Party: NPF
- Spouse: Kevilezo Kense
- Children: 2
- Education: Bishop Cotton Girls' School
- Alma mater: Lady Shri Ram College (BA); University of Delhi (LLB); University of San Francisco (LLM)
- Occupation: Politician • Social entrepreneur
- Awards: Nari Shakti Puruskar

Hekani Jakhalu Kense (née Jakhalu; born after 1976) is an Indian politician and social entrepreneur from Nagaland. She set up the non-governmental organization YouthNet to help the youth of Nagaland pursue business opportunities. In 2018, she was recognised with the Nari Shakti Puraskar award.

In 2023, Jakhalu and Salhoutuonuo Kruse became the first woman from Nagaland to be elected to the Nagaland Legislative Assembly. Jakhalu is a member of the Naga People's Front(NPF).

== Early life ==
Hekani Jakhalu was born in Dimapur, Nagaland. She was educated at Bishop Cotton Girls' School in Bengaluru and earned a bachelor's degree in political science at Lady Shri Ram College in Delhi. She then studied for a Bachelor of Laws at the University of Delhi and took a Master of Laws at the University of San Francisco.

== Career ==
After working in the United States, Jakhalu returned to Delhi and began a career as a lawyer. She was made a partner in the firm but having seen firsthand the number of young people from Nagaland migrating to Delhi, she decided in 2006 to move to Kohima (the capital of Nagaland) in order to set up a non-governmental organization (NGO) called YouthNet which aims to create more opportunities for the youth of Nagaland. As of 2018, YouthNet had 30 employees and claims to have helped 23,500 people. It aims to help entrepreneurs pursue their ideas and set up a "Made in Nagaland" centre in Kohima which sells their artisan goods. After running for two years, the "Made in Nagaland" centre opened an e-commerce platform in 2020. In June 2025, YouthNet facilitated the disbursement of the Startup India Seed Fund Scheme to nine Nagaland-based startups, including Kohima-based cybersecurity firm NexusCipherGuard India.

In recognition of her work, Jakhalu received in 2018 the Nari Shakti Puraskar award, India's highest civilian award given only to women. She was the only person from the northeast of India to be honoured that year.
