= Chotisüh Sazo =

Indian politician

Speaker of Nagaland Legislative Assembly
- In office 15 March 2013 – 22 February 2017
- Succeeded by: Imtiwapang Aier
- Constituency: Chozuba Constituency

Member of Nagaland Legislative Assembly
- In office 2008–2023
- Preceded by: Thenucho Tunyi
- Succeeded by: Küdecho Khamo
- Constituency: Chozuba

Personal details
- Born: Chotisüh Sazo; 15 April 1962 (age 64) Phüsachodü Village, Phek District, Nagaland
- Party: Lok Janshakti Party (Ram Vilas)
- Other political affiliations: Naga People's Front (Before 2023)

Chotisüh Sazo (born 15 April 1962) is an Indian politician from Nagaland. He is a member of Lok Janshakti Party (Ram Vilas). He is a former speaker of Nagaland Legislative Assembly & former minister in the Government of Nagaland.

== Political career ==
In 2008 he was elected to the Nagaland Legislative Assembly as an Independent candidate and was appointed Parliamentary secretary for Social Welfare and Women Development.

In 2013 Sazo was elected as Speaker of Nagaland Legislative Assembly. Sazo is also a former Cabinet Minister for PHE Nagaland.

In 2013 and 2018 Sazo was elected as a Naga People's Front candidate in the Chozuba constituency (ST) and won.

In the 2008 election, as an Independent he won the seat against Thenucho of the NPF. Sazo got 8754 votes.
