= Kihoto Hollohon =

Indian politician (1932–2021)

Personal details
- Born: Kihoto Hollohon Yepthomi; 15 April 1932 Khukishe, Naga Hills District, Assam Province, British India (Now in Zünheboto District, Nagaland, India)
- Died: 15 October 2021 (aged 89) Dimapur, Nagaland, India
- Party: Nationalist Democratic Movement, Indian National Congress
- Known for Schedule-10 (52nd Constitutional Amendment) Challenge

Kihoto Hollohon Yepthomi (15 April 1932 – 15 October 2021) was a politician from Nagaland, India. He was elected to the Nagaland Legislative Assembly three times from Aghunato-34 A/C, three times from Dimapur III A/C and once from Ghaspani-II. Altogether, he sat as a member of the legislative assembly from 1977 to 2013.

== Early life ==
Kihoto Hollohon Yepthomi was born on 15 April 1932. His mother and father were Zhekheli and Kiyezhe Yepthomi of Khukishe village. He did his schooling from Sukhalu and Zünheboto LP school, Tokiye UP school, Satakha ME and Government High School, Shillong.

== Political career ==
Hollohon served in the Naga Home Guard and held a high rank in the Naga Underground Movement. He later became an inspector in the Nagaland Armed Police but resigned. He served as the President of Zünheboto Sadar in 1968, Joint Secretary UDF and UDF Central Committee. He was elected as RCM representing Satoi Tokiye region for three years.

He first contested state elections in 1977 as United Democratic Front (UDF) candidate and was elected to the Assembly from Aghunato constituency in Zünheboto District. He was re-elected from the same constituency in 1982 and 1987.

In 1989, he won elections from Dimapur-III.

He continued to be elected from Dimapur-III for subsequent terms till 2003, except in 1998, when heeding the call ‘Solution, Not Election’, he decided not to contest the assembly elections.

In 2008, he was elected as the MLA from Ghaspani-II constituency.

In 2013, Hollohon retired from active politics.

== Personal life ==
=== Attempted assassination ===
On 25 December 1996, while returning from Christmas service, Hollohon's wife, daughter, granddaughter and grandson were killed in a car bomb blast triggered from remote control by the NSCN-IM in an attempted assassination on Hollohon and his family in the Ara Mile neighbourhood of Dimapur. Hollohon survived as he was not in the vehicle. In the blast his wife Vitoli, his daughter Nishela, granddaughter Hollotoli and grandson Ninoto (2 year old) were all killed on the spot.

== Death ==
Hollohon died on 15 October 2021 at a private hospital in Dimapur due to age-related illness.
