= Y. Hewoto Awomi =

Indian politician

Hewoto was a politician from Nagaland, India. In 2003 he was elected to the Nagaland Legislative Assembly, as the Naga People's Front candidate in the constituency Dimapur-II (Scheduled Tribes).
