= Nationalist Democratic Movement =

- Abbreviation: NDM
- Leader: K. L. Chishi
- Founder: K. L. Chishi
- Merger of: Bharatiya Janata Party
- ECI Status: State Party

Election symbol
- Flash Light

The Nationalist Democratic Movement was a political party based in the Nagaland, India. Its chief was K. L. Chishi. It was recognised as a state party and participated in elections in 2003. The party symbol was a torch (flashlight). It merged with the Bharatiya Janata Party (BJP).

== Election results ==
In the 2003 Nagaland Legislative Assembly election, NDM won 5 seats with 10% of the vote share.
