= Naga People's Front =

Political party in India

- Abbreviation: NPF
- Leader: Neiphiu Rio
- President: Neiphiu Rio
- Founded: 21 October 1963
- Headquarters: Kohima, Nagaland
- Youth wing: Imchatoba Imchen
- Women's wing: Sano Vamuzo
- Ideology: Conservatism; Christian right Regionalism; Naga nationalism
- Political position: Centre-right
- Colours: Dark blue and Red
- Slogan: Facta non verba
- ECI status: State Party
- Alliance: NDA (2003-present); NEDA (2017-present)
- Seats in Rajya Sabha: 0 / 245
- Seats in Lok Sabha: 0 / 543
- Seats in Nagaland Legislative Assembly: 39 / 60
- Seats in Manipur Legislative Assembly: 5 / 60

Election symbol
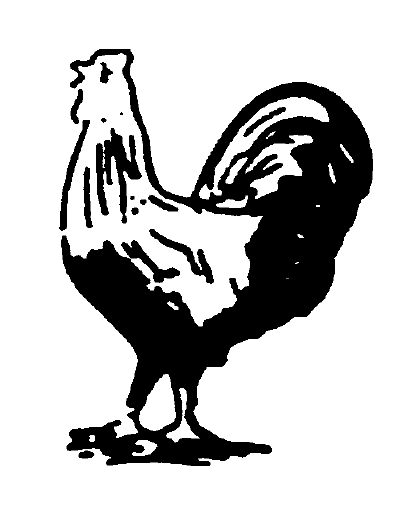
- Rooster

Party flag
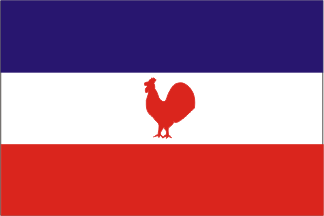

Website
- NagaPeoplesFront.org

The Naga People's Front (NPF) is a regional political party in the Indian states of Nagaland, Manipur and Arunachal Pradesh. It is currently the ruling party in the Indian state of Nagaland. It heads the Nagaland government with the Bharatiya Janata Party, as part of the People's Democratic Alliance. NPF is a coalition partner of the N. Biren Singh ministry-led BJP government in Manipur. The party ideology includes protecting Christian right, thus encouraging it. It demands and supports greater autonomy for Naga areas and Naga cultural nationalism.

Neiphiu Rio is the current president of the party. Awangbow Newmai is president of the party in Manipur, while Losii Dikho is the Legislature Party Leader of NPF in the Manipur Legislative Assembly. Neiphiu Rio, the Lok Sabha member from the lone constituency of Nagaland, is the leader of the party since 18 October 2025. He earlier served until 16 January 2018.

On 22 March 2004, the NPF merged with the Nagaland Democratic Party. On 19 October 2025, Nationalist Democratic Progressive Party merged with NPF.

== History ==
=== Name Changes ===
Over its history, the party has undergone several nomenclature changes while maintaining its original motto and symbol:

- 1963: Democratic Party of Nagaland (DPN)
- 1969: United Front of Nagaland (UFN).
- 1972: United Democratic Front (UDF).
- 1980: Naga Nationalist Democratic Party (NNDP).
- 1998: Naga People's Council (NPC).
- 2002: Rebranded to Naga People's Front (NPF) during its Ninth General Convention to be more inclusive.

Prior to October 2002, the party was known as Nagaland People's Council (NPC). The name of the party was changed to Naga People's Front (NPF) in the Ninth General Convention held at Kohima in October 2002. This historic decision found wide acceptance among the people of the state, as a popular wish of the state was to modify the leadership of the state and make it more inclusive.

For the 2014 General Election, the North-East Regional Political Front (NERPF), a consortium of 10 regional parties, including the Naga People's Front announced their support for the NDA.

Currently, the NPF is a part of North-East Regional Political Front consisting of political parties of the northeast which has supported the National Democratic Alliance (India).

In May 2016, after the Bharatiya Janata Party led National Democratic Alliance formed its first government in Assam, a new alliance called the North-East Democratic Alliance (NEDA) was formed with Himanta Biswa Sarma as its convener. The Chief Ministers of the north eastern states of Sikkim, Assam, Arunachal Pradesh and Nagaland too belong to this alliance. Thus, the Naga People's Front joined the BJP-led NEDA. On 18 May 2019 NPF pulled out of NDA Government in Manipur. After 2022 Manipur Legislative Assembly election, NPF rejoined NDA Government in Manipur.

On 21 October 2023, Apong Pongener was elected as President of Naga People's Front.

In June 2024 the NPF reaffirmed its support for the BJP government in Manipur.

In October 2025, the NDPP merged with the party and Neiphiu Rio became the party leader and national president. NPF became the ruling party of Nagaland.

== Aims and objectives ==
The aims and objectives of the Naga Peoples Front are:

1. To work and assist in any possible manner on any approach for a peaceful solution of the Indo-Naga political issue, keeping alive at the same time the fire of relentless endeavour to stand against any force to further divide the Nagas and thereby move towards a renaissance of Naga brotherhood by making constant appeal to Naga conscience.
2. To strive to bring about electoral reforms suited to our way of life aimed at a national resurgence in the society towards whom the Party is duty bound and thereby to liberate the Naga society from the deadly clutches of degeneration.
3. To work for unity and integrity of the people by integrating all contiguous Naga inhabited areas under one administrative roof and also to provide protection to all the ethnic groups who are indigenous inhabitants of the State.
4. To restore the good name and clean image which the Nagas enjoyed in the past by taking the fight against all forms of corruption at all levels of Government.
5. To restore to the people the self-discipline and the spirit of self-reliance which the Nagas had in abundance in the past but which have been seriously eroded in the recent past.
6. To work for economic advancement of the people with special emphasis on rural development with a view to removing economic disparity in the society.
7. To strive for a clean and efficient administration.
8. To strictly abide by the Rule of Law in the dispensation of Justice.

== List of chief ministers ==
No	Name	Portrait	Term of office		Days in office
1.	Neiphiu Rio		6 March 2003	3 January 2008	12 years, 14 days
1.	Neiphiu Rio		12 March 2008	24 May 2014	12 years, 14 days
1.	Neiphiu Rio		20 October 2025	Incumbent	12 years, 14 days
2.	T. R. Zeliang		24 May 2014	22 February 2017	3 years, 141 days
2.	T. R. Zeliang		19 July 2017	8 March 2018	3 years, 141 days
3.	Shürhozelie Liezietsu		22 February 2017	19 July 2017	147 days

== List of Presidents ==
No	Name	Term of office		Days in office
1.	Apong Pongener	21 October 2023	21 October 2025	2 years
2.	Neiphiu Rio	21 October 2025	Incumbent	364 days

== See also ==
- Vatsu Meru
- Rokonicha
- Y. Hewoto Awomi
- List of political parties in India
