= Khodao Yanthan =

Vice President, National Socialist Council of Nagaland (I-M)
- In office 10 April 1996 – 1 March 2010

Personal details
- Born: 25 August 1923 Lakhüti, Naga Hills District, Assam Province, British India (Now in Nagaland, India)
- Died: 1 March 2010 (aged 86) Lakhüti, Wokha District, Nagaland

Khodao Yanthan (25 August 1923 – 1 March 2010) was a Naga liberation leader and a member of the Naga National Council (NNC). He was popularly called, “the grand old man of Naga political struggle”.

== Early life ==
He was born to Nthîo Yanthan on 25 August 1923 at Lakhuti village in the erstwhile Naga Hills District (present, Wokha district). He was the second eldest amongst five male siblings. He attended the village Morung until he went to formal school in Jorhat at the age of eight. In 1943, he joined the Mission High School in Jorhat.

Yanthan's grandfather, Moyuthung Yanthan, was the last chief of the Kyong (now Lotha Naga) tribe. During the Second World War, he joined the Naga Labour Corps as a Quartermaster in 1942 (aged 19) and worked to combat the advancing Japanese forces in Northeast India. Initially, he was posted in Tamu, Myanmar. When still in 9th standard, ETD Lambert (police officer and Chief Intelligence Officer, Jorhat) visited his school and asked for volunteers who could speak English. He along with three other Lotha Naga police constables helped the 14th Division of the British Army to reach the Naga Hill from Mariani, Jorhat traversing through tea gardens and forests.

After the war, he finished his matriculation from Jorhat Mission School and proceeded to Serampore College for his Intermediate Arts. In March 1951, he took up a teaching position at the Wokha High School.

== Political life ==
In 1951, Yanthan was elected President of the Lotha Tribal Council. He was a member of the central executive body of the NNC.

When the Shillong Accord lost its legitimacy among the Naga people, the NNC split into two groups: one under the leadership of Yanthan (NNC-K) and another under Adino Phizo (NNC-A).

== Lobbying for Naga Independence ==
On arrival in London, Yanthan along with Gen. Sukhai Kaito, Maj. Gen. Mowu, and Yong Kong were briefly detained at the London airport. On 11 September 1962, they were freed from detention and admitted as citizens of the British Commonwealth. The four initially planned to travel to the United Nations to attempt a hearing before the General Assembly. They immediately met George Patterson of the International Committee for the Study of Group Rights, and Angami Zapu Phizo, the President of the Naga National Council, along with their legal advisers. The four men arrived in London via Karachi, after passing through the Indo-Burma areas.

In London, Khodao and Phizo worked towards informing people about the Naga situation and urged them to get involved. This included writing to newspapers. People he worked with included David Astor, the Archbishop of Canterbury, and bishop David Jenkins. Abraham Lotha writes, "For Khodao and the leaders, the ideas of independence and sovereignty are interchangeable. 'The Nagas are NOT demanding an independence from the British-made India. Nagas are defending their independence from India.' This was his mantra throughout his life."

=== Everyday Life in London ===
In London, Yanthan took the name 'Charles Lamb.' Living a difficult life, he moved 14 times into various residents between 1962 and 2000. There were periods when he was nearly homeless. On several occasions, his Jewish landlords helped him search a new apartment and move. Yanthan worked at different jobs, including twice at restaurants. Eventually, he asked the British Government in assisting him with formal training to qualify for another kind of job. He then got a position at the British Broadcasting Corporation World Service in 1971, where he worked until his retirement in 1988. He qualified for pension from both the state and BBC.

== Death ==
Yanthan died on 1 March 2010 in his ancestral village, Lakhüti.

On his death, his body was planned to be airlifted from Lakhüti to Dimapur. Ralanthung Yanthan, then Deputy Speaker of the Nagaland State Assembly, was on the Pawan Hans helicopter to escort the body to Dimapur with permission from the Nagaland Chief Minister's office to assist. However, the pilots insisted that the orders they received said that they should not go beyond Wokha. The helicopter returned to Dimapur without Khodao Yanthan's body. Thereafter, it was taken to Dimapur by road. In the wee hours of 3 March, Khodao's funeral convoy reached Camp Hebron. Indian security forces as well as National Socialist Council of Nagaland (I-M) lined the road to the camp. A large stage was built to accommodate around 100 VIP mourners. White and pink flowers in cane vases tied to bamboo poles adorned the coffin. After the eulogy, the NSCN-IM choir sang 'I will meet you in the morning' by Albert E. Brumley. After the funeral service in Camp Hebron, Dimapur, Yanthan's remains were returned to Lakhüti. Along the way, crowds gathered to pay their final tributes.

The National Socialist Council of Nagaland declared a seven-day mourning from 1 March to 7 March to honour Yanthan who was the Vice President of the organisation. Reflecting on Yanthan's life and death, Sanjay Barbora writes,

History has also shown us that with every act of renunciation comes an opportunity for renewal. Yanthan’s life was a remarkable sacrifice for a people and cause that now has to engage with serious questions for the future. This is the time for politics to begin to search for an ethical voice, in a manner of which he could have been proud.

=== Resting place ===
Yanthan's grave lies at Aitepyong in Lakhüti village. Before Yanthan died, he constructed his own tomb and authored his epitaph,

Here lies unsung a Naga patriot.

Praise the Lord

for giveth my life to serve for

the nation's cause.

Kuknalim.

Khodao Yanthan 1923-200-

Warning:

The survival of the Nagas

depend on their nationhood.

If the Nagas had failed to

uphold their ancestral sovereign nation,

they would become a lost tribes

and vanish in their disappearing

nation.

May God forbid it.

KY

== Cited works ==
- Lotha, Abraham (2017). Wounded Tiger: The Papers of Khodao Yanthan. Dimapur: Heritage Publishing House. ISBN 9789380500973.
- Kikon, Dolly; McDuie-Ra, Duncan (2021). Ceasefire City: Militarism, Capitalism, and Urbanism in Dimapur. New Delhi: Oxford University Press. pp. 186–189. ISBN 978019012973-6.
