= List of musicians from Nagaland =

The following is a list of musical groups or bands as well as musicians from the Indian state of Nagaland.

== Musical groups or bands ==
- Tetseo Sisters
- Trance Effect

== Musicians ==
- Temsu Clover (born 1996)
- Imnainla Jamir (born 2002)
- Silas Kikon (1956–2016)
- Moko Koza (born 1996)
- Anungla Zoe Longkumer
- Macnivil (born 1992)
- Abdon Mech (born 1996)
- Alobo Naga (born 1984)
- Methaneilie Solo (born 1955)
- Moa Subong

== See also ==
- List of Naga people
- Lists of musicians
