= Doyang–Dhansiri Valley =

Archaeological site in India

The Doyang–Dhansiri Valley is an ancient archaeological site in the southern part of Assam and the south western part of Nagaland in India, which is home to the rivers Dhansiri and its tributary, the Chathe and Doyang. The stretch of land is located in the middle of 25–26.8 E and 93–94.5 N where it is almost fully surrounded by hills, with the north being an exception as it expands into the Assam Valley. The valley has attracted the attention of archaeologists for its artefacts, which have contributed to the study of ancient Assam and their rulers, religions, and cultures, specifically in the time period of 2nd century A.D. to 18th century A.D.

== Bibliography ==
- Dutta, H.N. (2012). History, Art and Archaeology of Doiyang-Dhansiri Valley. Guwahati: LBS Publications. ISBN 9788185921808.
- Dutta, Hemendranath (1997). Art and archaeology of the Doiyang Dhansiri valley of Assam (PhD thesis). Gauhati University. hdl:10603/66569.
