= Lotha Naga =

Major Naga ethnic group found in Nagaland

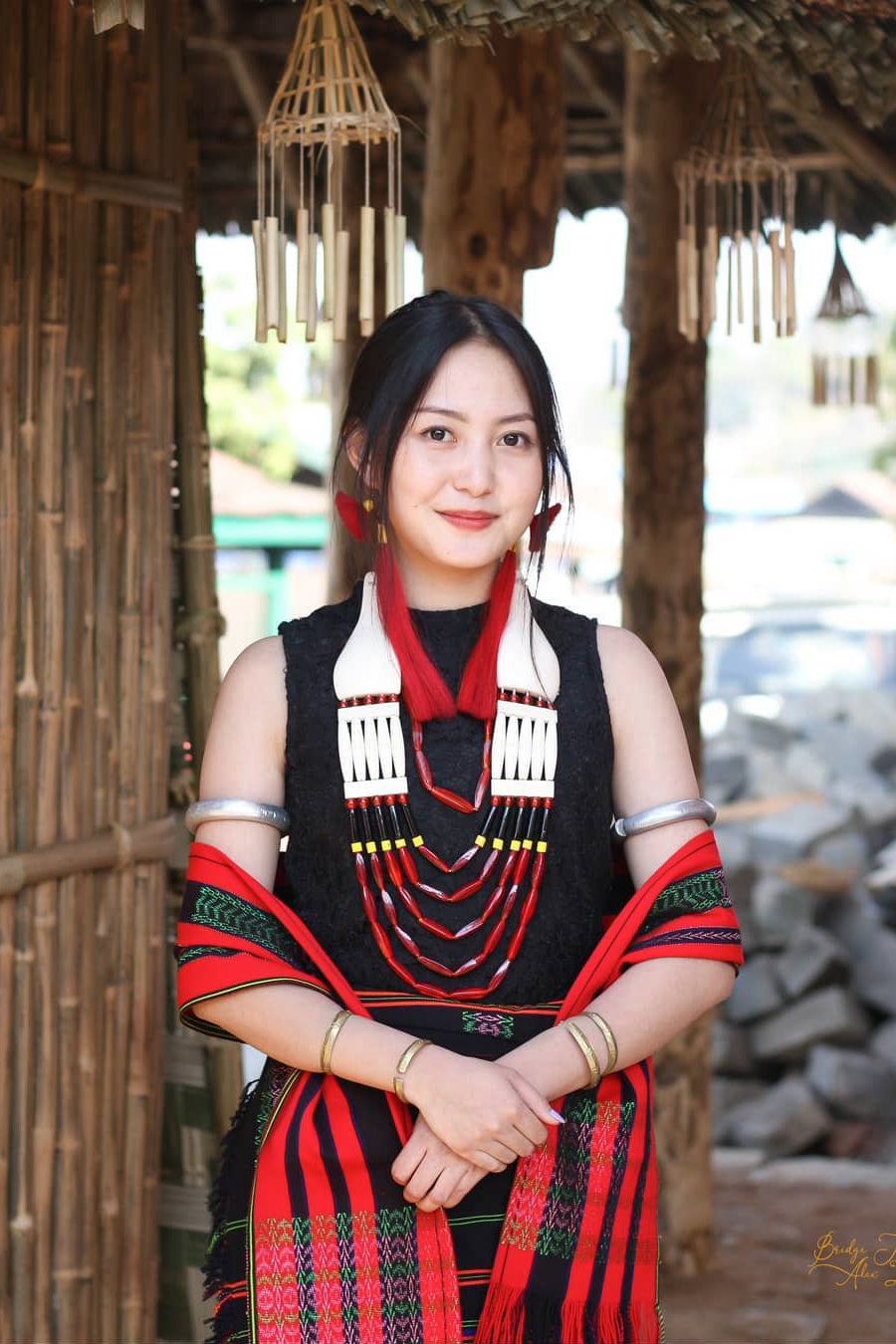

Total population
- 173,111 (2011 census)

Languages
- Lotha language (Sino–Tibetan)

Religion
- Christianity (chiefly Baptist)

Related ethnic groups
- other Naga Ethnic Groups

Lotha Nagas, also known as Kyongs, are a major Naga ethnic group native to Wokha District in the Northeast Indian state of Nagaland.

== Origins ==
Scholars have presented several theories about the migration of the Lothas and the other Naga people, based on vocal explanations passed on from one generation to another.

=== Migration from eastern China ===
According to this theory mentioned by Hokishe Sema, the Lothas started moving out from the Eastern part of China, passing through Malaysia, Indonesia and Burma en route. After many long years of movement, they reached a place called Khezakhenoma located between Manipur and Chakhesang (the present-day Phek), where they settled for a short period of time. From Khezakhenoma they moved towards the present day settlement of the Lothas i.e. Wokha district where they finally settled.

=== Migration from Manchuria ===
This theory, mentioned by T. Phillips, says that the Lothas migrated from Manchuria, passing through the foothills of the Himalayas and reached Manipur via Burma. From Manipur, they moved out and settled at the present day place.

=== Migration from Lenka ===
There are multiple versions of this theory:

- The Lothas ancestors lived in a place called Lenka, situated east of the Naga territory (modern Nagaland). During the course of migration the Lothas split into two groups. The first group, after reaching the Brahmaputra Valley, settled there while the second group went towards the mountainous region of the present day Nagaland.
- The Lothas, Sangtams, Rengmas and the Sumis have a common ancestor and had dwelled mutually as one in their past. But at some stage in their course of migration from Lenka, the Sangtams decided to go separate ways from a place called Mao.
- The Lothas, along with the other Naga ethnic groups, reached the present-day Kohima and settled at a place called Lezama. This is the place where the Semas parted with the other Naga ethnic groups and the Lothas with the Rengmas settled at a hill called Themoketsa (the Lothas called this place Honoyonton). Here the Rengmas parted ways from the Lothas. One group of Lothas went towards Doyang, passing through villages like Shaki and Phiro. The other group moved towards the hilly region of the present Wokha and settled at a place called Longchum near the Niroyo village.

Local traditions mention that the Rengmas and the Lothas were once part of a single ethnic groups. There are also oral records of a mighty struggle between the combined Rengma villages, and the Lotha village of Phiro.

== Distribution ==
=== Towns and villages under Wokha District ===
- Yikhüm, Englan, Lakhüti, Pangti, Tsüngiki, Wokha,Chudi Riphyim Old, Riphyim New, Mekokla, Akük New, Akük Old, Aitepyong Town, Chankayan, Soku, Baghty, Baghty Town, Upper Baghty, Bhandari Town, Yimpang, Alikhüm, Longchüm, Yimparasa, Bhandari village, Yimza, Mongphio, Lishyüo, Yanmhon Old, Rüchan village, Koro, Pangtong, Serika A, Yanmhon New, Longayim, Lio, Wokha Old, Seed Farm, Lisayan, Liphi, Mekirang, Suphayan, Serika B, Lio Wokha New, Merapani, Hayiyan, Lio Longidang, Changpang, Akahaqua, Tssori Old, Tssori New, Lichuyan, Mithehe, Changpang Hq, Longtsiri Village, Mungya, Nungying, Seluku, Koio, Chükitong Town, Longtsüng, Morakjo, Lotsü, Pyangsa, Moilan, Pyotchü, Sheru Echuk, Ralan Hq, Ralan Old, Ralan New, Woruku, Chandalashung Old, Chandalashung New, Chandalashung B, Yampha, Liphayan, Shoshan, S. Wochan, Yanlum, Tchutsaphen, Sanis, Sanis Town B (Jn), Sanis Town A, Sunglup, Yonchücho, Meshangpen, Tsopo, Chudi, Okotso, Süngro Town, Aree Old, Aree New, Longsa, Hümtso, Elümyo, Changsu Old, Changsu New, Niroyo Wokha, Longsachung, Okheyan Wokha, Yanthamo, Longla, Wokha, Yimkha, Wokha, N Longidang, Pongidong, Vankhosung (Mission Compound), Nyiro Compound, Phiro, Shaki, Sankitong, Hanku, N. Longchum, Yankeli, Yanthung, Wozhüro EAC HQ.h

=== Other parts of Nagaland ===
Apart from Wokha District, there are also sizeable Lotha population in Kohima, Chümoukedima, Dimapur, and Medziphema.

== Culture ==
Wokha District is the traditional home of the Lotha Nagas. The Lothas are renowned for their colorful dances and folk songs. The male members wear shawls indicating their social status. The prestigious social shawl for women is Opvüram and Longpensü for men.

Like many Nagas, the Lothas practiced headhunting in the older days. After the arrival of Christianity, they gave up this practice. Though the majority of the Lothas are Baptist, there exist a moderate amount of other forms of Christianity like the Catholics. Catholics are concentrated more in Wokha than in other parts of Nagaland.

=== Festivals ===
==== Tokhü Emong ====
Tokhü Emong is celebrated on 7 November. It is the harvest festival of the Lotha Nagas. It is celebrated in the 1st week of November every year and it stretches over to 9 days. Earlier, no particular date was fixed. However, in order to carve unity and uniformity among the ranges, Wokha elders decided to celebrate it on a fixed date. Following this Tokhü Emong is celebrated on 7 November, every year.

== Notable people ==
- Zuboni Hümtsoe (1990–2017), businessperson
- Mmhonlümo Kikon, politician
- Dolly Kikon, anthropologist
- Silas Kikon (1956–2016), singer
- James Kithan, sportsperson
- Abraham Lotha, anthropologist
- T. M. Lotha (1951/1952–2020) politician
- Yanthungo Patton, politician
- Khodao Yanthan (1923–2010), Naga nationalist leader
