= Nagaki (disambiguation) =

Nagaki is a proposed planned city located in the Chathe Valley in Chümoukedima District, Nagaland, India.

Nagaki may also refer to:

== People ==
- Ryota Nagaki (born 1988), Japanese footballer

== Places ==
- Nagaki Rüzaphema International Airport, a greenfield airport to be developed at Rüzaphema, Chümoukedima District, Nagaland, India
- Nagaki Union Council, one of the 51 union councils of Abbottabad District in Khyber-Pakhtunkhwa province of Pakistan
