= MG Music Awards =

Annual Nagaland music awards

- Current: 2022 MG Music Awards
- Awarded for: Excellence in music
- Country: India
- Presented by: Musicians Guild Nagaland
- First award: 21 June 2021; 5 years ago
- Website: musiciansguildnagaland.com

The MG Music Awards was an annual music awards show presented by the Musicians Guild Nagaland. The annual ceremony was first held as a virtual event on 21 June 2021. The awards show has not been held since its second edition in 2022.

== Ceremonies ==
Edition	Date	Venue	Venue City	Host	Ref.
1st	21 June 2021	Online event		Mengu Süokhrie and Yanpvüo Kikon	
2nd	18 June 2022	RCEMPA Hall	Kohima	Ruopfüzhano Whiso	

== Categories ==
- Best Electronic Artist
- Best Folk Fusion
- Best Gospel Artist
- Best Hip Hop Artist
- Best Indie Artist
- Best Music Video
- Best Pop Duo/Group
- Best Pop Female
- Best Pop Male
- Best Rock Artist
- Best Song of the Year
- Best Sound Engineer

== Song of the Year ==
Year	Winner	Song
2022	Klanjan	"Knight in Shining Armour"
2021	Trance Effect	"Clowns"

== Best Music Video ==
Year	Artist	Song
2022	Lily Sawian x B4NSHAN & Lucy	"Suri"
2021	Abdon Mech	"Give Me My Soul Back"
