= Silas Kikon =

Indian singer and composer

- Kikon performing on stage
- Born: Silas Kikon; 19 October 1956; Lakhüti, Naga Hills District, Assam, British India (Now in Wokha District, Nagaland, India)
- Died: 25 June 2016 (aged 59); Wokha, Nagaland, India
- Musical career
- Origin: Wokha
- Genres: Country music • Pop music

Silas Kikon (19 October 1956 – 25 June 2016) was an Indian singer and composer from Nagaland. He is known for his hit song "Ayo Choro Küpi Na".

== Biography ==
Silas Kikon was born on 19 October 1956 to a Lotha Naga family from Lakhüti. Kikon was active in Nagaland during the 1980s and until the end of the 20th century. He was known for his hit song Choro Küpi and for his contribution to the promotion of Lotha songs in this modern era.

He died on 25 June 2016 at Civil Hospital, Wokha and his remains were laid to rest at his native village, Lakhüti.

On 25 October 2019, Kikon was posthumously awarded the Nagaland Musicians Collective (NMC) for excellence in music.

== Discography ==
- ‘Choro Küpi’ (1993)
