= Y. Mhonbemo Hümtsoe =

Indian politician

Y. Mhonbemo Humtsoe (born 1959) is an Indian politician from Nagaland. He is an MLA from the Wokha Assembly constituency, which is reserved for Scheduled Tribe community, in Wokha district. He won the 2023 Nagaland Legislative Assembly election, representing the Nationalist Congress Party.

== Early life and education ==
Humtsoe is from Wokha, Nagaland. He is the son of Yanphamo Humtsoe. He completed his M.A. in history in 1981 at North Eastern Hill University.

== Career ==
Humtsoe won the Wokha Assembly constituency representing the Nationalist Congress Party in the 2023 Nagaland Assembly election. He polled 15,949 votes and defeated his nearest rival, Renponthung Ezung of the Bharatiya Janata Party, by a margin of 3,061 votes. Earlier, he lost the 2018 Nagaland Assembly election to Chumben Murry of Naga People's Front by a margin of 8,555 votes. He, along with 6 other NCP MLA's, joined the NDPP (now NPF) in 2025.
