= Tsüngiki =

- Village
- Location in Nagaland, India Tsüngiki (India)
- Coordinates: 26°6′15.75″N 94°20′12.05″E
- Country: India
- State: Nagaland
- Elevation: 1,305 m (4,281 ft)

Population (2011)
  - Total: 3,320

Languages
  - Dialect: Lotha
- Time zone: UTC+5:30 (IST)
- PIN: 797111
- Vehicle registration: NL-05

Tsüngiki, which means Abode of Cloud, is a Lotha Naga village located in Chukitong Circle of Wokha District, Nagaland with a total of 556 families residing.

== People ==
The Tsüngiki village has population of 3320 (1667 males and 1653 females), as per Population Census 2011. They speak the Lotha language. The people from Tsüngiki village are Christian. The village celebrated its 100 Years of Christianity in January 2018.

== Distance from Nearby Towns ==
Wokha is nearest town to Tsüngiki which is approximately 18km away. The surrounding nearby villages and its distance from Tsüngiki are Mungya 2.5km, Koio 3.4km, Seluku 3.8km, Chukitong 4.2km, Yimkha 4.6km, Longla 6.2km, Nungying 6.3km, Yanthamo 6.4km.

== Crops and its Benefits ==
Tsüngiki Village has fertile soil suiting many crops. Some of the cash crops are groundnut and sugarcane. The Way side Market On NH-02(old NH-61)helps in sustaining and maintaining the economic growth of the villagers.

== Place of Interest ==
Dongti is a place a hill where a viewing tower has been constructed where one can view neighboring villages, towns, mountains and the Doyang River. Also one can come and witness traditional fishing (using tree roots) which is jointly held between Tsüngiki Village and the neighboring villages of Sümi Naga at Doyang River.
