= List of airports in Nagaland =

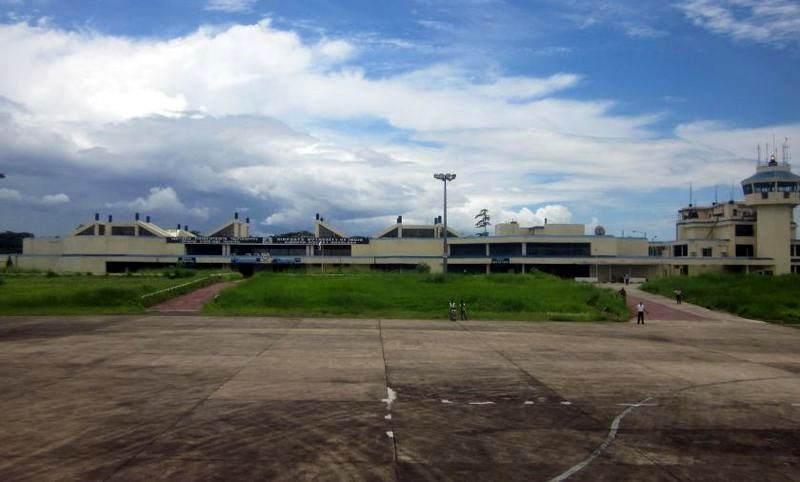
Dimapur Airport

The Indian state of Nagaland currently has only one operational airport, the Dimapur Airport. The airport is operated by the Airports Authority of India and is connected to several prominent Indian cities. A new airport is also proposed to be built at the state capital Kohima to improve connectivity in Nagaland. The new airport at Kohima is proposed to be built at Chiethu, 25 kilometres from Kohima. In July 2021, the proposed airport received a no-objection certificate from the Ministry of Defence, India.

== List ==
The list includes the airports in Nagaland with their respective ICAO and IATA codes.

List of airports in Nagaland
Sl. no.	Location in Nagaland	Airport name	ICAO	IATA	Operator	Category	Role
1	Chümoukedima	Dimapur Airport	VEMR	DMU	Airports Authority of India	Domestic	Commercial
2	Nagaki	Nagaki Rüzaphema International Airport	—	—	Airports Authority of India	International (Proposed)	Commercial
3	Kohima	Kohima Chiethu Airport	—	—	Airports Authority of India	Domestic (Proposed)	Commercial
