= Dolly Kikon =

Naga Anthropologist

Professor Dolly Kikon
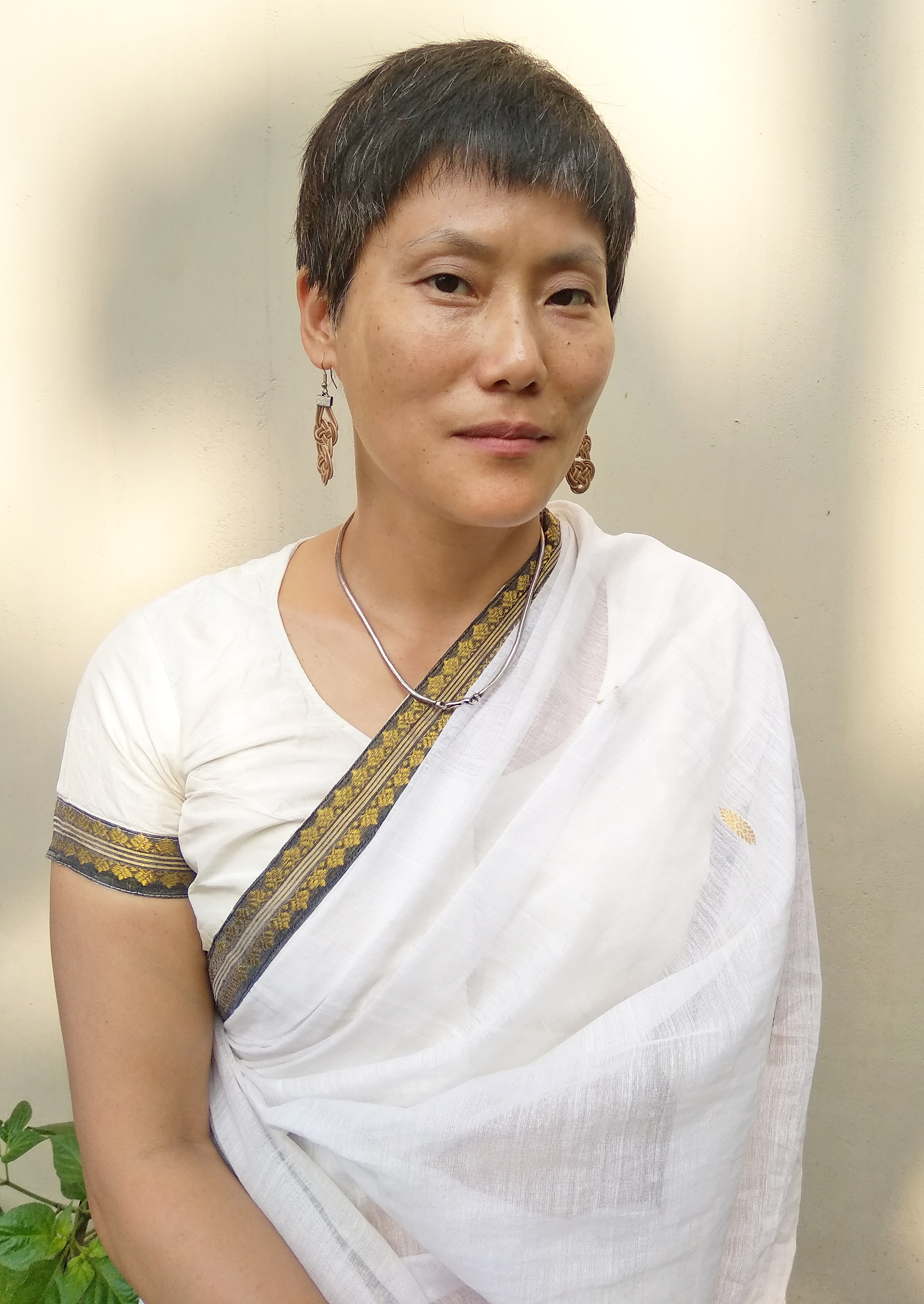
- Born: 1975 (age 50–51); Dimapur
- Citizenship: Indian
- Spouse: Sanjay Barbora

Academic background
- Education: Stanford University, Hong Kong University of Science and Technology, University of Delhi

Academic work
- Discipline: Anthropology
- Sub-discipline: Development studies
- Main interests: Gender, Anthropology of the State, Citizenship, Human Rights, migration, Resource conflicts, Food Studies
- Website: www.dollykikon.com

Dolly Kikon is an Indigenous anthropologist and author from Nagaland, India. She is a Professor at the Department of Anthropology, University of California, Santa Cruz. She was previously Associate Professor of Anthropology at the University of Melbourne and a senior research advisor at the Australia India Institute, engaging in research and policy initiatives between India and Australia (2015-2023) She serves on the Council of Advisors for The India Forum.

== Education ==
In 1997, Kikon received her B.A. (History Honours) from Miranda House College, University of Delhi. In 2001, she completed her LL.B from the Campus Law Center at the University of Delhi. She moved to Hong Kong University of Science and Technology for her M. Phil. Her dissertation was titled Compromised democracy and the politics of participation: a case study of the Naga people from Northeast India (2002–2004). The thesis examined the Naga people's participation in Indian electoral system, development initiatives by Indian security forces and the Indo-Naga ceasefire negotiations.

She obtained her doctoral degree in social and cultural anthropology from Stanford University in 2013. Titled, Disturbed Areas Act: Anxiety, Intimacy and the State in Northeast India, her dissertation looked into the "state-making processes in contemporary India... and the many unheralded, though significant ways in which people in the foothills transgress and embrace the cultural and political roles ascribed to them by the modern state." During the doctoral studies, she received the Wenner-Gren Foundation's Dissertation Fieldwork Grant, the Stanford Interdisciplinary Graduate Fellowship, the Center for South Asia Community Service Fellowship (Stanford University) and the Mellon Foundation Dissertation Fellowship.

== Career ==
In 2024, Kikon joined UCSC's Anthropology department as a professor and senate faculty. Since 2024, Kikon is also the director of UCSC's Center for South Asian Studies.

== Anthropology of food ==
Kikon's work on food navigates through landscapes of hills, valleys and foothills in Northeast India, and challenges the existing notions of sovereignty limited to territoriality. The layered articulation of food and the sensory perceptions attached to it challenge anthropological understanding of indigenous food. Therefore, significantly, her work revolves around indigenous food and fermentation as a technique for preservation.

Her article, Tasty Transgression: Food and Social Boundaries in the Foothills of Northeast India, questions the sensory perception of classifying the taste of food as belonging either to the hills or the plains. Through her fieldwork, she points out that this distinction falls apart at landscapes classified as foothills, the geography that situates itself between the two. Farming practices at the foothills transgress social structures and taboos attributes exclusively to societies either in the hills or the valleys.

In her article, Fermenting Modernity: Putting Akhuni on the Nation’s Table in India, she points out that cultures of reciprocity and eating in Northeast India are integral in order to challenge existing notions of sovereignty as a political project limited to territoriality. Speaking through akhuni – fermented Naga soya beans – she reiterates that everyday practices of eating are entangled with social relationships and histories of sharing and loss.

== Gender studies ==
=== Women's Reservation in Nagaland ===
Kikon has been a vocal supporter for Women's Reservation in Nagaland. After the Supreme Court directive to implement reserved seats for Urban Local Bodies' election, protests erupted in Dimapur and Kohima which soon spread across the state. Kikon along with other women started a petition appealing to the Naga community and governments to 'recognise the importance of a gender inclusive political participation.' She points out that the exclusion of women from powerful decision-making bodies formed under the customary law negates the notion that these institutions are pillars of justice." The iteration of Naga culture as pure and unique has come to be contested in the ongoing debate about women’s rights. She also draws parallels between the Indian state and the customary law institutions for "excluding the Naga women from all spheres of representative political processes." She challenges the view that Naga women's assertions for gender justice is ‘anti-Naga’.

== Migration studies ==
Kikon was granted the Riksbankens Jubileumsfond Postdoctoral Fellowship at Stockholm University (2013–15) for "The Indian Underbelly: Marginalisation, Migration and State in the Periphery." This work traced the increasing outmigration from Northeast India to the rest of the country. Focusing on migration, it examined the expansion and outcomes of developmental activities of the Indian state in areas associated with economic backwardness, subsistence agriculture and armed conflict. Kikon and Karlsson define 'wayfinding' as a "voyage without a map or beaten paths or pathways to follow and with no clear destination or end station". In the process of wayfinding, young indigenous migrations struggle to make out what and where home is. As they move out of agricultural activities, they are constantly in search out new places and possibilities creating cultural fissures at various levels.

Part of the project, Kikon and Bengt G. Karlsson also collaborated with Andrzej Markiewicz on a photoethnography project titled, Wayfinding. The project was exhibited in Guwahati, Dimapur, Gangtok, Kathmandu, and Stockholm.

== Human rights advocacy ==
Kikon worked as a lawyer in the Supreme Court of India and the Gauhati High Court between 2001 and 2002. Her legal advocacy work dealt with Article 371 (A), a constitutional provision relating to customary rights, custodianship over land and resource ownership as well as indigenous rights.

She has been part of several fact-finding teams over the years in Northeast India: And Quiet Flows the Kopili, Report of Human Rights Violation in the Karbi-Anglong District of Assam (2002); Death, Insurgency, Impunity: A Report on Extra-Judicial Killings in Tinsukia, Assam (2011). She has been associated with the Naga People's Movement for Human Rights, Sisterhood Network (Dimapur), Prodigals' Home (Dimapur), The Turning Point (Mon district) and Action Aid (Northeast India). She continues to lend her voice towards the campaign to repeal the Armed Forces Special Powers Act (1958), an extra-constitutional regulation in India that gives access power to the Indian armed forces in Northeast India.

== Notable works ==
- 2004. Experiences of Naga Women in Armed Conflict: Narratives from a Militarized Society. Delhi: Women in Security, Conflict Management and Peace.
- 2015. Life and Dignity: Women's Testimonies of Sexual Violence in Dimapur (Nagaland). Guwahati: North Eastern Social Research Centre.
- 2019. Living with Oil and Coal: Resource Politics and Militarization in Northeast India. Seattle: University of Washington Press.
- 2019. (with Bengt G. Karlsson). Leaving the Land: Indigenous Migration and Affective Labour in India. New Delhi: Cambridge University Press.
- 2021. (with Duncan McDuie-Ra). Ceasefire City: Militarism, Capitalism, and Urbanism in Dimapur. New Delhi: Oxford University Press.
- 2023. (with Dixita Deka, Joel Rodrigues, --, Bengt G. Karlsson, Sanjay Barbora, and Meenal Tula). Seeds and Sovereignty: Eastern Himalayan Experiences. Guwahati: North Eastern Social Research Centre.
- 2024. (co-edited with Joel Rodrigues). Food Journeys: Stories from the Heart. New Delhi: Zubaan.

== Recognition ==
- Wenner Gren fellowship
- Henry Hart Rice Visiting faculty, MacMillan Center for International and Areas Studies, Yale University (2023)

== Personal life ==
Dolly Kikon belongs to a Lotha Naga family. Her ancestral village is Tsüngiki in Wokha District. Kikon's mother Mhalo Kikon attended the Golaghat Mission Girls High School in Assam, an educational institution set up by the American missionaries. Kikon's father Wopansao Kikon studied in Kohima and played football for various Naga teams during his youth. Kikon's maternal grandparents Mr. Nzio Hümtsoe and Ms. Oponlumi Hümtsoe were both Baptist pastors. Today, the Lotha Baptist mission in Wokha district recognizes them as visionaries who contributed, along with their colleagues, in establishing the Christian faith among the Lotha community in Tsungiki village and Wokha town. Kikon's paternal grandfather Mr. Luke Kikon was a medical compounder and her grandmother Ms. Oreno Kikon was a trader who set up one of the first shops managed and owned by a woman in Wokha town.

Kikon is married to Sanjay Barbora, formerly at the Tata Institute of Social Sciences, and currently teaching in the sociology department of University of California, Santa Cruz.
