= 2022 MG Music Awards =

Nagaland music award ceremony

- 2022 MG Music Awards title card
- Date: 18 June 2022
- Location: RCEMPA Hall, Jotsoma, Kohima District, Nagaland, India
- Hosted by: Ruopfüzhano Whiso
- Most awards: Achumla Jingrü (2)
- Website: Official website

The 2022 MG Music Awards, the 2nd edition of the ceremony, was held at the RCEMPA Hall in Jotsoma, Nagaland on 18 June 2022. Organized by Musicians Guild Nagaland, India, the event was the first offline edition since the 1st edition was held online in June 2021 due to the COVID-19 pandemic.

== Winners ==
Song of the Year	Best Music Video
Klanjan – Knight in Shining Armour	Lily Sawian x B4NSHAN & Lucy – Suri
Best Electronic Artist	Best Folk Fusion
Valentina, GFRY, Jintu	Achumla Jingrü & Albert Jingrü – Oh Mungmung
Best Gospel Artist	Best Hip Hop/Rap Artist
Achumla Jingrü	Big Dane
Best Indie Artist	Best Rock Artist
Temsu Clover	Fifth Note
Best Pop Solo Artist	Best Pop Duo/Group
KL Pamei	The Gluttones
Most Promising Artist	Best Sound Engineer
Joshua Shohe; O Daapun	Ode; Tk Lemtur
