= Bengt G. Karlsson =

Swedish anthropologist

Professor Bengt G. Karlsson
- Born: 1961 (age 64–65)
- Known for: Unruly Hills: A Political Ecology of India’s Northeast 'Anthropology and the Indigenous Slot'

Academic background
- Education: Lund University
- Thesis: Contested Belonging: An Indigenous Peoples Struggle for Forest and Identity in Sub-Himalayan (1997)

Academic work
- Discipline: Anthropology
- Sub-discipline: Environmental anthropology, Development anthropology
- Institutions: Stockholm University

Bengt Gosta Karlsson Bermsjo is a professor of social anthropology at Stockholm University. His research engages mainly with Indigenous people in Northeast India and political ecology. He is known for his book, Unruly Hills: A Political Ecology of India’s Northeast, and article, "Anthropology and the 'Indigenous' Slot."

== Early life ==
Bengt grew up in the coastal town of Piteå in Norrbotten County, the northernmost län in Sweden. He left the town when he was 19. Bengt's paternal grandfather worked as a teacher in the mining town of Gällivare in northern Sweden, who later became a labour party leader and then the chairman of the city council.

Karlsson received his PhD in Social Anthropology from Lund University in 1997. His dissertation titled, Contested Belonging: An Indigenous Peoples Struggle for Forest and Identity in Sub-Himalayan dealt with 'the modern predicament of the Rabha or Kocha people, their survival in the forest and their quest for identity.' For the thesis, Karlsson spent a year, between 1990 and 1995, for ethnographic fieldwork with the Rabha people living in India, especially villages around Buxa Tiger Reserve and areas in the Dooars in North Bengal. He also undertook archival research with the India Office Records in London.

Karlsson has lived in several countries such as Austria, India, the United States, England, Georgia, and Kenya. Several of his childhood friends have returned to Piteå after living and working in Stockholm for a few decades.

== Academic career ==
Karlsson was the director of the Nordic Centre in India from 2005–2006 while affiliated with Uppsala University.

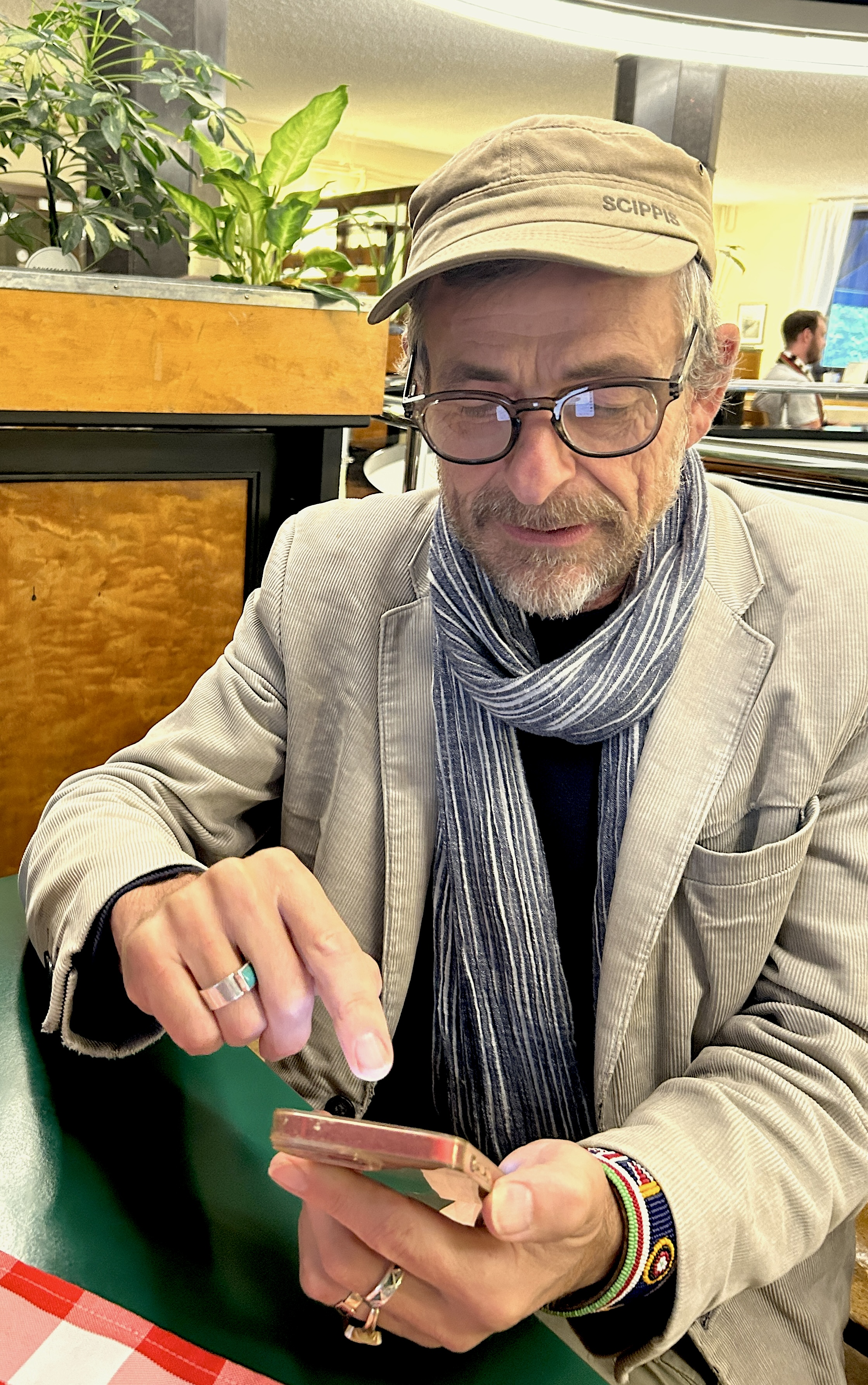
Prof. Karlsson in 2023

He is an elected member of the Royal Swedish Academy of Letters, History and Antiquities since 2015. He is a board member of the Swedish Society for Anthropology and Geography. Since the formation of the Stockholm Center for Global Asia at Stockholm University in 2021, to promote research and education in Sweden focused on Asia, he has been one of its board member.

== Research ==
Karlsson is an environmental anthropologist.

Karlsson published Unruly Hills in 2011 with Berghahn Books. Orient Blackswan and Social Science Press published the South Asia print in 2011. Anthropologist Robbins Burling in his review of the book calls the book a "penetrating, although dispiriting, analysis of the terrible economic, political, and environmental problems... of Meghalaya." Burling recommends the book to understand corruption, land alienation, and exploitation of natural resources. It is one of the significant monographs from Sweden that engages with anthropological concerns at the intersections of human ecology and political ecology while focusing on Northeast India.

== Books ==
- Contested Belonging: An Indigenous People’s Struggle for Forest and Identity in Sub-Himalayan Bengal (Routledge, 2000)
- Unruly Hills: A Political Ecology of India’s Northeast (Berghahn Book, 2011)
- Leaving the Land: Indigenous Migration and Affective Labour in India (Cambridge University Press, 2019, co-authored with Dolly Kikon)

=== Edited volumes ===
- Indigeneity in India (Kegan Paul, 2006, with Tanka Bahadur Subba)
- Geographies of Difference: Explorations in Northeast Indian Studies (Routledge, 2017, with M. Vandenhelsken and M. Barkataki-Ruscheweyh)
- Seedways: The Circulation, Care and Control of Plants in a Warming World (Vitterhetsakademien, 2021, with Annika Rabo).

== Bibliography ==
- Kikon, Dolly; Karlsson, Bengt G. (2019). Leaving the Land: Indigenous Migration and Affective Labour in India. Cambridge: Cambridge University Press. ISBN 978-1-10849-442-7.
