= Achumbemo Kikon =

Indian politician

Achumbemo Kikon (born 1976) is an Indian politician from Nagaland. He is an MLA from the Bhandari Assembly constituency, which is reserved for Scheduled Tribe community, in Wokha district. He won the 2023 Nagaland Legislative Assembly election, representing Naga People's Front.

== Early life and education ==
Kikon is from Bhandari, Wokha district, Nagaland. He is the son of John Kikon. He completed his LLB in 2003 at Nagaland University. Earlier, he did his B.A. in 1998 at a college affiliated with Nagaland University.

== Career ==
Kikon was elected from the Bhandari Assembly constituency representing the Naga People's Front in the 2023 Nagaland Legislative Assembly election. He polled 13,867 votes and defeated his nearest rival and sitting MLA, Mmhonlumo Kikon of the Bharatiya Janata Party, by a margin of 3,589 votes. Earlier, he lost twice in the 2018 and 2013 Assembly elections to Mmhonlumo Kikon.

In 2018, he lost as an NPF candidate by a margin of 312 votes and in 2013 election, he lost as an independent politician by a margin of 254 votes. After the election, the secretary general of NPF, said that lack of resources for the party is one of the reasons for its losses as only two of the 22, NPF candidates won the election. Kikon started his political career as a student. He was elected as the president of the Naga Students' Federation representing the Lotha Students' Union and served from May 2003 to 2005 .
