= Nagaki Union Council =

Nagaki
- Union Council
- Country: Pakistan
- Province: Khyber Pakhtunkhwa
- District: Abbottabad
- Tehsil: Abbottabad

Population (2017)
  - Total: 11,439

Nagaki is one of the 51 union councils of Abbottabad District in Khyber-Pakhtunkhwa province of Pakistan. According to the 2017 Census of Pakistan, the population is 11,439.

== Subdivisions ==
- Banda Baz Dad
- Jaswal
- Nagaki
- Ukhreela
