= Mmhonlümo Kikon =

Indian politician (born 1978)

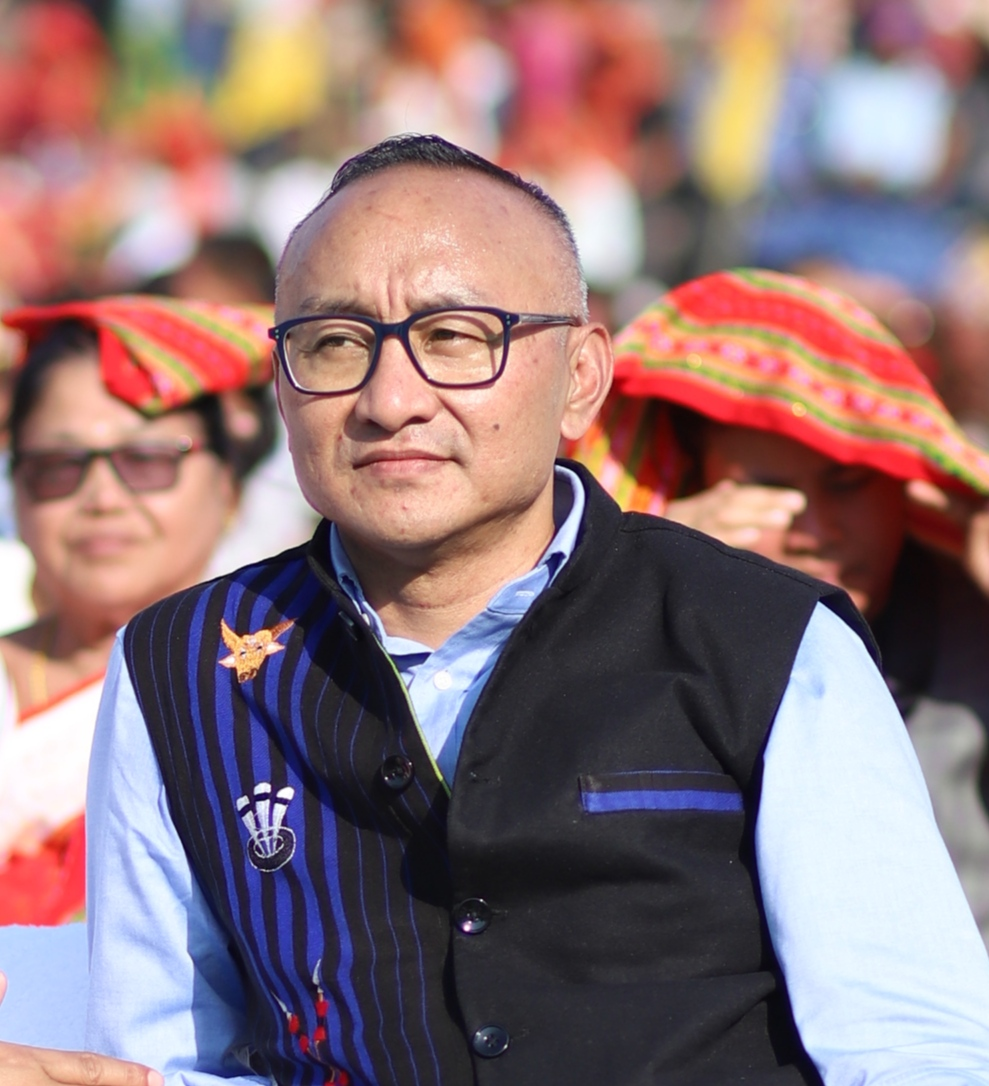
- Kikon in 2025

National Spokesperson of Bhartiya Janata Party
- In office 26 September 2020 – 07 August 2025

Advisor, Information Technology & Communication, Science & Technology, NRE, Government of Nagaland
- In office April 2020 – January 2023
- Constituency: Bhandari

Minister of Geology and Mining, Border Affairs, Government of Nagaland
- In office June 2017 – December 2017
- Constituency: Bhandari

Personal details
- Born: 1 May 1978 (age 48) Kohima, Nagaland, India
- Party: Bharatiya Janata Party
- Children: 3 (two daughters and one son)
- Education: St. Stephen's College, Delhi (M.A) University of Delhi (B.A)
- Profession: Writer, social worker, politician

Mmhonlümo Kikon (born 1 May 1978) is an Indian politician, scholar, poet, and social worker from Nagaland. He was a member of the Bharatiya Janata Party (BJP) and was the member of the Nagaland Legislative Assembly from Bhandari Constituency in Wokha District. Kikon was also a National Spokesperson of the Bharatiya Janata Party until his resignation from the party.

Kikon has published two books of poems since 2018. He completed his master's degree in English Literature from Delhi University. He is also an ASPEN Fellow.

A former Minister in the Government of Nagaland, he also served in the position of Advisor to the Government of Nagaland on Information Technology and Communication, New & Renewable Energy, Science & Technology. He was given additional responsibility as the Prabhari (in-Charge) of Mizoram state of the BJP. He was defeated in the 2023 Nagaland Legislative Assembly election by Achumbemo Kikon of the NPF.

== Early life ==
Kikon has published 2 books of poems under his name (The Village Empire and The Penmi Poems: A Requiem). Indian Olympic boxer and Member of Parliament, Rajya Sabha, Mary Kom formally released the book on "The Village Empire" written by Mmhonlümo Kikon at her residence in New Delhi.

In 2023, Vintage India published His Majesty’s Headhunters, a work on the history of Northeast India authored by Mmhonlümo Kikon.

== Political career ==
Kikon first stood for elections from the Bhandari Assembly constituency in the 2008 Nagaland elections as a Nationalist Congress Party (NCP) candidate. He lost to Wochumo Kithan of the Naga People's Front (NPF) by 1758 votes. Kikon was then elected to the Nagaland Legislative Assembly from the Bhandari constituency in the year 2013 on a NCP ticket. He defeated his nearest rival Achumbemo Kikon, an independent candidate, with a small margin of 254 votes. After winning four seats in the elections, NCP decided to support Rio's DAN government in the state. He was appointed the chairperson of MARCOFED (Nagaland State Co-operative Marketing and Consumers’ Federation Ltd.). For the 2014 Indian general election, Kikon was appointed the party's observer for the states of Northeast India.

Kikon was elected for a second term in the 2018 Nagaland Legislative Assembly election from the Bhandari seat. He defeated Achumbemo, once again with a small margin of 312 votes. This time Mmhonlümo fought on a BJP ticket, and Achumbemo on an NPF ticket.

In his first term, Kikon served as a Parliamentary Secretary for Skill development and Labour, and then served for another six months as a Cabinet Minister for Geology and Mining and Border Affairs. He was appointed the State Election Officer of the BJP for Nagaland state in 2016.

During his second term, Kikon was the Advisor to the Government of Nagaland on Information and Technology, Science & Technology, and New & Renewable Energy. In the year 2018, he was appointed the Chief Whip of the BJP Legislature Party in the Nagaland Legislative Assembly. Kikon was also featured among the Top 50 MLAs in India in a survey conducted by the magazine ‘Fame India’. In 2020, Kikon was appointed a National Spokesperson of the Bharatiya Janata Party. In addition to this, he was also given the responsibility of Prabhari or state in-charge of Mizoram.

Kikon lost the Bhandari seat in the 2023 Nagaland Legislative Assembly election to Achumbemo by a margin of 3589 votes.
