= List of rivers of Nagaland =

The following is a list of selected rivers in Nagaland.

== List ==
- Chathe
- Dhansiri
- Doyang

== See also ==
- List of rivers
- Geography of Nagaland
