= Wokha Assembly constituency =

Legislative Assembly constituency in Nagaland State, India

Coordinates: 26.09°N 94.26°E

Wokha
- Constituency No. 38 for the Nagaland Legislative Assembly

Constituency details
- Country: India
- Region: Northeast India
- State: Nagaland
- District: Wokha
- Lok Sabha constituency: Nagaland
- Established: 1964
- Total electors: 25,750
- Reservation: ST

Member of Legislative Assembly
- 14th Nagaland Legislative Assembly
- Incumbent Y. Mhonbemo Hümtsoe
- Party: NPF
- Alliance: NDA
- Elected year: 2023

Wokha is one of the 60 Legislative Assembly constituencies of Nagaland state in India. It is part of Wokha district and is reserved for candidates belonging to the Scheduled Tribes. It is also part of Nagaland Lok Sabha constituency.

== Members of the Legislative Assembly ==
Year	Member	Party
1964	N. L. Odyuo	Independent politician
1969	N. L. Odyuo	Nagaland Nationalist Organisation
1974	Mhao Lotha	United Democratic Alliance
1977	Rainbow Ezung	Independent politician
1982	Mhao Lotha	Naga National Democratic Party
1987	John Lotha	Independent politician
1989	Dr. T. M. Lotha	Naga People's Front
1993	John Lotha	Indian National Congress
1998	John Lotha	Indian National Congress
2003	Dr. T. M. Lotha	Bharatiya Janata Party
2008	Dr. Chumben Murry	Nationalist Congress Party
2013	Dr. T. M. Lotha	Nationalist Congress Party
2018	Dr. Chumben Murry	Naga People's Front
2023	Y. Mhonbemo Hümtsoe	Nationalist Congress Party

== Election results ==
=== 2023 Assembly election ===
2023 Nagaland Legislative Assembly election: Wokha
Party	Candidate	Votes	%	±%
NCP	Y. Mhonbemo Hümtsoe	15,949	54.64%	
BJP	Renponthung Ezung	12,888	44.16%	25.74%
INC	N. Wobenthung Lotha	324	1.11%	
NOTA	Nota	26	0.09%	
Margin of victory		3,061	10.49%	−21.97%
Turnout		29,187	93.39%	9.34%
Registered electors		31,252		−0.35%
NCP gain from NPF		Swing	-1.76%	

=== 2018 Assembly election ===
2018 Nagaland Legislative Assembly election: Wokha
Party	Candidate	Votes	%	±%
NPF	Dr. Chumben Murry	14,870	56.41%	10.12%
JD(U)	Y. Mhonbemo Hümtsoe	6,315	23.96%	
BJP	Dr. T. M. Lotha	4,855	18.42%	
NOTA	None of the Above	321	1.22%	
Margin of victory		8,555	32.45%	27.86%
Turnout		26,361	84.06%	−9.98%
Registered electors		31,361		−8.51%
NPF gain from NCP		Swing	5.53%	

=== 2013 Assembly election ===
2013 Nagaland Legislative Assembly election: Wokha
Party	Candidate	Votes	%	±%
NCP	Dr. T. M. Lotha	16,401	50.88%	6.96%
NPF	Dr. Chumben Murry	14,919	46.28%	34.83%
INC	E. T. Ezung	802	2.49%	−18.21%
Margin of victory		1,482	4.60%	−13.71%
Turnout		32,233	94.04%	13.31%
Registered electors		34,277		−14.28%
NCP hold		Swing	6.96%	

=== 2008 Assembly election ===
2008 Nagaland Legislative Assembly election: Wokha
Party	Candidate	Votes	%	±%
NCP	Dr. Chumben Murry	14,181	43.93%	19.70%
BJP	Dr. T. M. Lotha	8,270	25.62%	−9.71%
INC	Mhao Humtsoe	6,683	20.70%	4.62%
NPF	A. Yentsao Odyuo	3,697	11.45%	−12.91%
RJD	Khyothungo K. Ovung	574	1.78%	
Margin of victory		5,911	18.31%	7.34%
Turnout		32,283	83.54%	2.92%
Registered electors		39,988		31.70%
NCP gain from BJP		Swing	8.60%	

=== 2003 Assembly election ===
2003 Nagaland Legislative Assembly election: Wokha
Party	Candidate	Votes	%	±%
BJP	Dr. T. M. Lotha	8,347	35.33%	
NPF	A. Yentsao Odyuo	5,755	24.36%	
NCP	Khyothungo	5,724	24.23%	
INC	John Lotha	3,799	16.08%	
Margin of victory		2,592	10.97%	
Turnout		23,625	77.82%	77.82%
Registered electors		30,364		12.58%
BJP gain from INC		Swing	6.58%	

=== 1998 Assembly election ===
1998 Nagaland Legislative Assembly election: Wokha
Party	Candidate	Votes	%	±%
INC	John Lotha	Unopposed		
Registered electors		26,971		27.88%
INC hold		Swing		

=== 1993 Assembly election ===
1993 Nagaland Legislative Assembly election: Wokha
Party	Candidate	Votes	%	±%
INC	John Lotha	4,386	28.75%	−18.96%
Independent	Dr. T. M. Lotha	4,181	27.41%	
Independent	Mhao Humtsoe	3,018	19.78%	
NPF	K. Renthungo Murry	2,034	13.33%	−38.95%
Independent	Wobenthung Murry	1,142	7.49%	
Democratic Labour Party (India)	Rainbow Ezung	493	3.23%	
Margin of victory		205	1.34%	−3.22%
Turnout		15,254	72.68%	−6.13%
Registered electors		21,091		60.96%
INC gain from NPF		Swing	-23.53%	

=== 1989 Assembly election ===
1989 Nagaland Legislative Assembly election: Wokha
Party	Candidate	Votes	%	±%
NPF	Dr. T. M. Lotha	5,346	52.28%	
INC	John Lotha	4,879	47.72%	19.44%
Margin of victory		467	4.57%	1.10%
Turnout		10,225	78.81%	2.68%
Registered electors		13,103		0.24%
NPF gain from Independent		Swing	14.69%	

=== 1987 Assembly election ===
1987 Nagaland Legislative Assembly election: Wokha
Party	Candidate	Votes	%	±%
Independent	John Lotha	3,689	37.60%	
NND	Dr. T. M. Lotha	3,349	34.13%	0.12%
INC	Mhao Humtsoe	2,774	28.27%	−4.25%
Margin of victory		340	3.47%	1.97%
Turnout		9,812	76.13%	14.91%
Registered electors		13,071		0.09%
Independent gain from NND		Swing	3.59%	

=== 1982 Assembly election ===
1982 Nagaland Legislative Assembly election: Wokha
Party	Candidate	Votes	%	±%
NND	Mhao Lotha	2,693	34.01%	
INC	Rainbow Ezung	2,575	32.52%	
Independent	A. Khyochamo Khuvung	1,765	22.29%	
Independent	Punkathung Lotha	885	11.18%	
Margin of victory		118	1.49%	−6.20%
Turnout		7,918	61.22%	−17.90%
Registered electors		13,059		69.95%
NND gain from Independent		Swing	-19.84%	

=== 1977 Assembly election ===
1977 Nagaland Legislative Assembly election: Wokha
Party	Candidate	Votes	%	±%
Independent	Rainbow Ezung	3,199	53.85%	
UDA	Mhao Lotha	2,742	46.15%	11.91%
Margin of victory		457	7.69%	−1.84%
Turnout		5,941	79.13%	−1.37%
Registered electors		7,684		26.07%
Independent gain from UDA		Swing	19.60%	

=== 1974 Assembly election ===
1974 Nagaland Legislative Assembly election: Wokha
Party	Candidate	Votes	%	±%
UDA	Mhao Lotha	1,667	34.24%	
NNO	N. L. Odyuo	1,203	24.71%	−17.18%
Independent	Santsurhomi Ezung	909	18.67%	
Independent	Nim Odyuo	493	10.13%	
Independent	Chandemo	316	6.49%	
Independent	Nchumbemotungoe	280	5.75%	
Margin of victory		464	9.53%	8.65%
Turnout		4,868	80.49%	−5.72%
Registered electors		6,095		44.88%
UDA gain from NNO		Swing	-7.65%	

=== 1969 Assembly election ===
1969 Nagaland Legislative Assembly election: Wokha
Party	Candidate	Votes	%	±%
NNO	N. L. Odyuo	1,517	41.89%	
Independent	Wopansao	1,485	41.01%	
Independent	Yantsomo Odyuo	320	8.84%	
Independent	Nim Odyuo	299	8.26%	
Margin of victory		32	0.88%	−7.38%
Turnout		3,621	86.21%	−1.74%
Registered electors		4,207		52.70%
NNO gain from Independent		Swing	-12.24%	

=== 1964 Assembly election ===
1964 Nagaland Legislative Assembly election: Wokha
Party	Candidate	Votes	%	±%
Independent	N. L. Odyuo	1,310	54.13%	
Independent	Tsatheo Murry	1,110	45.87%	
Margin of victory		200	8.26%	
Turnout		2,420	87.95%	
Registered electors		2,755		
Independent win (new seat)				

== See also ==
- List of constituencies of the Nagaland Legislative Assembly
- Wokha district
- Nagaland
- Nagaland (Lok Sabha constituency)
