= Chathe =

River in India

Physical characteristics
- Mouth: Dhansiri River
  - coordinates: 25°58′22″N 93°46′35″E
- Length: 45 km (28 mi)

Basin features
- Progression: Dhansiri River→ Brahmaputra River→Bay of Bengal

The Chathe (/tʃɑːthɛ/) is a river that flows through the Chümoukedima District of Nagaland, it flows to join the Dhansiri River in Assam which together in turn is a left tributary of the Brahmaputra River.

== See also ==
- Chathe Valley
- List of rivers of Nagaland
