= Temsu Clover =

Indian singer-songwriter from Nagaland

- Born: Temsukala Lemtur; 3 October 1996 (age 29); Nagaland, India
- Occupation: Singer–songwriter
- Years active: 2019–present
- Musical career
- Origin: Dimapur, Nagaland, India
- Genres: Indie pop

Temsukala Lemtur (born 3 October 1996), known professionally as Temsu Clover, is an Indian singer-songwriter from Nagaland.

== Early life and career ==
Temsukala Lemtur was born on 3 October 1996 to an Ao Naga family.

In 2019, she recorded "Confessions of a Bipolar Mind" at Jam Studio 11 in Dimapur using money she had saved during her college years. The song marked her introduction to the music scene in Nagaland. The song received the Best Upcoming Artiste award at the 11th Music Awards of Nagaland in November 2019.

Clover released her debut studio album, Hello Love, on 25 October 2023. The album contains eight tracks and has a running time of approximately 30 minutes.

== Personal life ==
In addition to music, Temsu Clover is interested in painting.

== Discography ==
=== Studio albums ===
- Hello Love (2023)

=== Selected singles ===
- "Confessions of a Bipolar Mind" (2020)
- "Blue" (2020)
- "Dumplings for the Sad" (2021)
- "Midnight Disco" (2022)
- "Cry for You" (2023)
- "Parasite" (2024)
- "Slide" (2025)
- "Beautiful Hurt" (2025)
- "Don't Wanna Be" (2026)
- "Feeling Good" (2026)

== Awards and nominations ==
Awards and nominations for Temsu Clover
Year	Award	Category	Recipients and nominees	Result	Ref.
2019	Music Awards of Nagaland	Best Upcoming Artiste	"Confessions of a Bipolar Mind"	Won	
2021	Music Awards of Nagaland	Best Pop Song (Solo)	"Dumplings for the Sad"	Won	
2021	2021 MG Music Awards	Most Promising Artiste	—	Won	
2022	2022 MG Music Awards	Best Indie Artist	—	Won	
