= Battle of Kikrüma =

1851 Indian colonial conflict

Date	1851; 175 years ago
Location	Kikrüma (now in Phek District, Nagaland) 25°34′47.18″N 94°13′6.88″E
Result	Kikrüma warrior victory

Belligerents
British East India Company	Eastern Angami (Chakhesang Naga)
- Location within Nagaland, India

The Battle of Kikrüma was fought on 11 and 12 February 1851 in Northeast India between the warriors of Kikrüma village (of present-day Nagaland) and the forces of the British East India Company. The battle, in which Naga warriors of the Eastern Angamis (now known as the Chakhesangs) armed with only spears and bows and arrows fought against British soldiers armed with rifles, was one of the bloodiest battles fought in the hills of Northeast India. While the battle is not very well known in other parts of India or the world, the battle is remembered through oral stories of the local people and has been written about by a British officer Major John Butler.

== Background and the battle ==
After the First Anglo-Burmese War, and the Treaty of Yandabo, the British took control of Assam and Manipur. The battle occurred thereafter when the British started expanding into the Naga hills in order to create a road to Assam, drawn by the prospect of profitable tea plantations and trade.

The Nagas, who viewed the British as trespassers on their soil and a threat to their people started raiding the British from time to time. Even after launching nearly ten expeditions to subdue the Nagas, the British faced defeat and humiliation repeatedly.

Finally, the British regrouped and launched a last and final offensive to subjugate the Nagas, resulting in the Battle of Kikrüma. Both sides suffered heavy casualties in the battle, but the Nagas once again proved to be too powerful to be subdued and subjugated.

== Aftermath ==
The battle resulted in the British initiating a policy of non-interference in the hills. The Nagas persisted with their raids into British-held plains areas.

== Memorial ==
In May 2022, a monolith memorial was erected in the village of Kikrüma to commemorate the battle and to serve as a reminder to the current generation of the values that its forefathers cultivated and practised: bravery, courage, valour, and unity among its people.
