= T. M. Lotha =

Indian politician (died 2020)

T. Myingthungo Lotha (1951/1952 – 25 March 2020) was an Indian physician and politician who served in the Nagaland Legislative Assembly.

Born in Longsa village, Lotha studied medicine at Assam Medical College and the All India Institute of Medical Sciences, Calcutta and became a government assistant surgeon in 1977. He ran unsuccessfully in November 1987 for the Nagaland Legislative Assembly from the Wokha constituency in Wokha district as a member of the Nationalist Democratic Progressive Party.

== Early life ==
He was elected in 1989 as a member of the Nagaland People's Council and twice re-elected, in 2003 as a member of the Bharatiya Janata Party (BJP) and after losing the election in 2008, in 2013 as a member of the Nationalist Congress Party. In 2014 he returned to the BJP with two other Assembly members. He was defeated for re-election in 2018. He headed a variety of ministries during his time in the assembly, including the home ministry, medical ministry, and horticulture ministry. He was a founding member of the organization Naga HoHo and chaired its political affairs committee from 2008 to 2012.

Lotha was married and had seven children.
