= Chathe Valley =

Valley in Nagaland

Geography
- Coordinates: 25.706900°N 93.859322°E
- River: Chathe
- Interactive map of Chathe Valley

The Chathe Valley is a valley located in the Chümoukedima District of the Indian state of Nagaland. The valley is drained by the Chathe River.

The valley is the proposed site of the Nagaki Global City.

== Development ==
The Chathe Valley is the proposed site of Nagaki Global City. The project has been envisioned as a modern planned urban development by the Government of Nagaland. The proposed development is intended to support urban expansion in the Dimapur–Chümoukedima–Kohima region and promote economic growth in the state.
