= Nagaki Rüzaphema International Airport =

- IATA: None; ICAO: none

Summary
- Airport type: Public
- Owner: Airports Authority of India
- Serves: Nagaki; Kohima; Chümoukedima; Dimapur
- Location: Nagaki, Chümoukedima District, Nagaland, India

Nagaki Rüzaphema International Airport is a greenfield airport to be developed at Rüzaphema in the Chümoukedima District of the Indian state of Nagaland. It is expected to serve the proposed Nagaki Global City as well as the nearby urban centers of Kohima, Chümoukedima and Dimapur.

The project has received feasibility approval from the Airports Authority of India and is planned to support the development of the proposed Nagaki Global City and improve regional air connectivity.

== See also ==
- Kohima Chiethu Airport
- Dimapur Airport
- List of airports in Nagaland
