= Bhandari Assembly constituency =

Legislative Assembly constituency in Nagaland State, India

Coordinates: 26.29°N 94.12°E

Bhandari
- Constituency No. 40 for the Nagaland Legislative Assembly

Constituency details
- Country: India
- Region: Northeast India
- State: Nagaland
- District: Wokha
- Lok Sabha constituency: Nagaland
- Established: 1964
- Total electors: 26,957
- Reservation: ST

Member of Legislative Assembly
- 14th Nagaland Legislative Assembly
- Incumbent Achumbemo Kikon
- Party: NPF
- Alliance: NDA
- Elected year: 2023

Bhandari is one of the 60 Legislative Assembly constituencies of Nagaland state in India.

It is part of Wokha district and is reserved for candidates belonging to the Scheduled Tribes.

== Members of the Legislative Assembly ==
Year	Member	Picture	Party
1998	L. Yanthungo Patton		Indian National Congress
2003	E. T. Ezung		Nationalist Democratic Movement
2008	Wochumo Kithan		Naga People's Front
2013	Mmhonlümo Kikon		Nationalist Congress Party
2018	Mmhonlümo Kikon		Bharatiya Janata Party
2023	Achumbemo Kikon		Naga People's Front

== Election results ==
=== 2023 Assembly election ===
2023 Nagaland Legislative Assembly election: Bhandari
Party	Candidate	Votes	%	±%
NPF	Achumbemo Kikon	13,867	54.11%	9.60%
BJP	Mmhonlümo Kikon	10,278	40.11%	−5.68%
NPP	Tsungro Kithan	1,072	4.18%	3.70%
INC	Chenithung Humtsoe	325	1.27%	0.60%
Independent	John Ovung	77	0.30%	
NOTA	Nota	7	0.03%	
Margin of victory		3,589	14.01%	12.73%
Turnout		25,626	95.06%	0.48%
Registered electors		26,957		4.18%
NPF gain from BJP		Swing	8.33%	

=== 2018 Assembly election ===
2018 Nagaland Legislative Assembly election: Bhandari
Party	Candidate	Votes	%	±%
BJP	Mmhonlümo Kikon	11,205	45.79%	
NPF	Achumbemo Kikon	10,893	44.51%	42.61%
JD(U)	Myinthungo Mozhui	1,997	8.16%	−20.64%
INC	E. Thungchamo Ezung	164	0.67%	−2.61%
NPP	Mhonjan Lotha	119	0.49%	
NOTA	None of the Above	95	0.39%	
Margin of victory		312	1.27%	0.24%
Turnout		24,473	94.58%	−3.33%
Registered electors		25,876		2.97%
BJP gain from NCP		Swing	12.52%	

=== 2013 Assembly election ===
2013 Nagaland Legislative Assembly election: Bhandari
Party	Candidate	Votes	%	±%
NCP	Mmhonlümo Kikon	8,183	33.26%	14.51%
Independent	Achumbemo Kikon	7,929	32.23%	
JD(U)	Mhonjan Lotha	7,085	28.80%	16.10%
INC	Y. Yisao	807	3.28%	
NPF	Er. Wochumo Kithan	468	1.90%	−24.51%
Independent	Yanpansao Lotha	29	0.12%	
Margin of victory		254	1.03%	−6.63%
Turnout		24,603	97.91%	6.38%
Registered electors		25,129		0.28%
NCP gain from NPF		Swing	6.84%	

=== 2008 Assembly election ===
2008 Nagaland Legislative Assembly election: Bhandari
Party	Candidate	Votes	%	±%
NPF	Wochumo Kithan	6,059	26.42%	12.29%
NCP	Mmhonlümo Kikon	4,301	18.75%	
RJD	Yiphyolumo Lotha Mozhui	3,097	13.50%	
JD(U)	Mhonjan Lotha	2,912	12.70%	
LJP	Achumbemo Kikon	2,244	9.78%	
BJP	C. Kikon	2,115	9.22%	3.59%
Margin of victory		1,758	7.66%	3.59%
Turnout		22,936	93.30%	7.28%
Registered electors		25,060		24.72%
NPF gain from NDM		Swing	-4.69%	

=== 2003 Assembly election ===
2003 Nagaland Legislative Assembly election: Bhandari
Party	Candidate	Votes	%	±%
NDM	E. Thungchamo Ezung	5,240	31.11%	
INC	L. Yanthungo Patton	4,554	27.04%	
SAP	Mhonjan Lotha	3,698	21.95%	
NPF	Tsenlamo Kikon	2,380	14.13%	
BJP	Tsungro	949	5.63%	
Margin of victory		686	4.07%	
Turnout		16,844	84.24%	84.24%
Registered electors		20,093		17.85%
NDM gain from INC		Swing	-6.06%	

=== 1998 Assembly election ===
1998 Nagaland Legislative Assembly election: Bhandari
Party	Candidate	Votes	%	±%
INC	L. Yanthungo Patton	Unopposed		
Registered electors		17,049		51.97%
INC gain from NPF		Swing		

=== 1993 Assembly election ===
1993 Nagaland Legislative Assembly election: Bhandari
Party	Candidate	Votes	%	±%
NPF	Tsenlamo Kikon	3,753	37.17%	−8.07%
INC	E. Thungchamo Ezung	3,521	34.87%	−19.89%
Independent	L. Yanthungo Patton	1,947	19.28%	
Independent	Abemo Humtsoe	876	8.68%	
Margin of victory		232	2.30%	−7.23%
Turnout		10,097	90.69%	3.61%
Registered electors		11,219		4.87%
NPF gain from INC		Swing	-17.59%	

=== 1989 Assembly election ===
1989 Nagaland Legislative Assembly election: Bhandari
Party	Candidate	Votes	%	±%
INC	E. Thungchamo Ezung	5,071	54.76%	13.95%
NPF	Tsenlamo Kikon	4,189	45.24%	
Margin of victory		882	9.52%	8.48%
Turnout		9,260	87.08%	−2.62%
Registered electors		10,698		8.07%
INC gain from NND		Swing	12.91%	

=== 1987 Assembly election ===
1987 Nagaland Legislative Assembly election: Bhandari
Party	Candidate	Votes	%	±%
NND	Tsenlamo Kikon	3,698	41.85%	2.13%
INC	E. Thungohamo Ezung	3,606	40.81%	−0.09%
Independent	T. C. Kithan	1,261	14.27%	
Independent	Lochumlo Yanthan	271	3.07%	
Margin of victory		92	1.04%	−0.13%
Turnout		8,836	89.71%	17.11%
Registered electors		9,899		−12.26%
NND gain from INC		Swing	0.95%	

=== 1982 Assembly election ===
1982 Nagaland Legislative Assembly election: Bhandari
Party	Candidate	Votes	%	±%
INC	E. Thungchamo Ezung	3,311	40.90%	4.55%
NND	Tsenlamo Kikon	3,216	39.72%	
Independent	Yanthungo Patton	1,028	12.70%	
Independent	K. Elias Lotha	541	6.68%	
Margin of victory		95	1.17%	−12.37%
Turnout		8,096	72.59%	−14.07%
Registered electors		11,282		63.72%
INC gain from NCN		Swing	-8.99%	

=== 1977 Assembly election ===
1977 Nagaland Legislative Assembly election: Bhandari
Party	Candidate	Votes	%	±%
NCN	Tsenlamo Kikon	2,951	49.89%	
INC	Mhondamo Kithan	2,150	36.35%	
UDA	Nzanbemo Kinghen	814	13.76%	−36.42%
Margin of victory		801	13.54%	13.17%
Turnout		5,915	86.66%	0.09%
Registered electors		6,891		21.62%
NCN gain from UDA		Swing	-0.30%	

=== 1974 Assembly election ===
1974 Nagaland Legislative Assembly election: Bhandari
Party	Candidate	Votes	%	±%
UDA	Mhondamo Kithan	2,434	50.19%	
NNO	Tsenlamo Kikon	2,416	49.81%	−13.15%
Margin of victory		18	0.37%	−25.57%
Turnout		4,850	86.57%	0.03%
Registered electors		5,666		52.89%
UDA gain from NNO		Swing	-12.78%	

=== 1969 Assembly election ===
1969 Nagaland Legislative Assembly election: Bhandari
Party	Candidate	Votes	%	±%
NNO	Tsenlamo Kikon	2,015	62.97%	
Independent	R. L. Kinghen	1,185	37.03%	
Margin of victory		830	25.94%	
Turnout		3,200	86.54%	86.54%
Registered electors		3,706		157.72%
NNO gain from Independent		Swing		

=== 1964 Assembly election ===
1964 Nagaland Legislative Assembly election: Bhandari
Party	Candidate	Votes	%	±%
Independent	Tsenlamo Kikon	Unopposed		
Registered electors		1,438		
Independent win (new seat)				

== See also ==
- List of constituencies of the Nagaland Legislative Assembly
- Wokha district
