= 2021 MG Music Awards =

Nagaland music award ceremony

- Date: 21 June 2021
- Location: Online ceremony
- Hosted by: Mengu Süokhrie; Yanpvüo Kikon
- Most awards: Abdon Mech (2)
- Website: Official website

The 2021 MG Music Awards, the first edition of the ceremony, was held on 21 June 2022. The event was held online due to the COVID-19 pandemic. Organized by Musicians Guild Nagaland, India, the event was hosted by Mengu Süokhrie and Yanpvüo Kikon.

== Winners and nominations ==
Song of the Year	Best Music Video
Trance Effect – Clowns; Joshua Shohe Ft. Tinu Lkr – Cliche; Takar Nabam – A Crime; The Wishess – If I could fly; About Us – Gimme Gimme; Abdon Mech – Again; Temsu Clover – Blue; Achumla Jingrü – Holo Hele; Unfamiliar Feelings – Not Funny; Moondrip – LT DWN	Abdon Mech – Give Me My Soul Back; Pezo Kronu – Feel Alive; Alemyim – Could I; Imcha Imchen – She's A Walking Temptation; Unfamiliar Feelings – Not Funny; Temsu Clover – Blue; Neil Umwi, Desmond Rimaki Sunn – Made For More; KL Pamei – Zianmei My Love; Trance Effect – Clowns; Meyisanen Lemtur – Years Gone By
Best Electronic Music	Best Gospel Song
Run Monday Run – Zongza; VI-LO x Thejaseno Dolie – Remember When; Itami x Langer – Zetsumyona; GFRY, Valentina – Feel Alright; Adam Pearce & Mozzy – Voices	Achumla Jingrü – Holo Hele; Aren Jamir – Yeshu; Senti & Hopong – New Start; Sweven – Back To You; ZT Slingshot ft. Wetsote-u Letro - Believe
Best Indie Song	Best Hip Hop/Rap Artist
Abdon Mech – Again; Aben – Sugar Coated Dreams; Klanjan – Time; Shujan De – Oceans; Temsu Clover – Blue	Prodg's Paigham – Anonymous Jamir X Echognize; Big Dane – Selfish; Mozzey ft. M-Dox – Feeling Good; ZT Slingshot – Top; Z World ft. JPollnd – Die a legend
Best Rock Song	Best Sound Engineer
About Us – Gimme Gimme; Blue Temptation – Evil Mind; Fifthnote – Misfortune; The Paradigm Shift – From The Ashes; The Wishess – If I Could Fly; Version2 – Surety	Tongs Kichu (Ode Studio); Cornelius Kharsyntiew Legato; Haggai Rongmei; Infinite Records; Vitz Zhimo
Best Pop Song
Moondrip – LT DWN; Joshua Shohe ft. Tinu Lkr – Cliche; KL Pamei – Zianmei My Love; Meyisanen Lemtur – Years Gone By; Pezo Kronu – Feel Alive; Swrba Sw Dongkhayw Nama – Crayon; Takar Nabam – A Crime; Trance Effect – Clowns; The Andrea Tariangband – My Time; Unfamiliar feelings – Not Funny
