= Lakhüti =

- Village
- Location of Lakhüti
- Coordinates: 26.2954583°N 94.249358°E
- Country: India
- Region: Northeast India
- State: Nagaland
- District: Wokha
- Elevation: 825 m (2,707 ft)

Population (2011)
  - Total: 7,614
  - Dialect: Lotha
- Time zone: UTC+5:30 (IST)
- PIN: 797100
- Vehicle registration: NL-01
- Sex ratio: 934 ♂/♀
- Website: nagaland.nic.in

Lakhüti is a Lotha Naga village located 127 km north of Kohima, the capital of Nagaland. Lakhüti is located in Aitepyong Circle of Wokha District, Nagaland. The village is bounded by Akuk village to the North, Pangti and Okotso villages to the East, Sunglup village and Baghty valley to the South and Yimpang village to the West. The nearest highway from the village is Sanis town which is 18 km drive from the village. The village has one Govt. High School and one Private High School-Don Bosco School, Lakhuti. Aitepyong hill top is the highest point in the village which is located at 1,210 m elevation from the mean sea level. Climate ranges from tropical at Baghty valley to sub-tropical at the village area.

== Demographics ==
Lakhuti has a total households of 1,077 with a population of 7,614 of which 3,937 are males and 3,677 are females as per Population Census 2011.
