= Robbins Burling =

American anthropologist (1926–2021)

- Born: April 18, 1926; Minneapolis, Minnesota
- Died: January 2, 2021 (aged 94); Michigan
- Occupation: Anthropologist
- Spouse: Sibyl Straub (m. 1951, died)
- Partners: Anne Hvenekilde; Sheila Procter

Academic background
- Education: Harvard University
- Thesis: Garo Marriage and Matrilineal Descent (1958)

Academic work
- Institutions: University of Michigan
- Main interests: Northeast India

Robbins "Rob" Burling (April 18, 1926 – January 2, 2021) was an American professor of anthropology and sociolinguistics.

== Early life and career ==
Burling was born in Minneapolis, Minnesota to Dr. F. Temple and Katherine White Burling, and was the eldest of three siblings. He received his undergraduate degree from Yale University in 1950 and his Ph.D. in Anthropology from Harvard University in 1958. His teaching career began as a teaching fellow in Anthropology at Harvard University in the fall of 1953, the spring of 1954 and the spring of 1957.

Burling was an instructor at the Department of Anthropology at the University of Pennsylvania from 1957-1959. He became an Assistant Professor of Anthropology at Pennsylvania from 1959-1963. From 1959-1963 he was the Assistant Curator of General Ethnology at the University Museum.

From 1959-1960, Burling was a visiting lecturer, Fulbright Program, in the Department of Sociology and Anthropology at the University of Rangoon, Burma. He became an Associate Professor of Anthropology and Associate of the Center for South and Southeast Asian Studies at the University of Michigan from 1966-1995. Dr. Burling was professor emeritus of Anthropology and Linguistics at the University of Michigan.

Burling specialized in language, human evolution and comprehension in communication. He has researched extensively in Bangladesh and India.

== Books ==
His books include Hill Farms and Padi Fields: Life in Mainland Southeast Asia, English in Black and White, The Passage of Power: Studies in Political Succession, The Strong Women of Madhupur (1997) and The Talking Ape: How Language Evolved.

== Festschrift ==
On the occasion of Robbins Burling's 90th birthday, a Festschrift was presented to him following his plenary lecture at the 8th International Conference of the North East Indian Linguistics Society (NEILS) at Tezpur University in Assam, India. The editors' introduction contains a longer overview of Burling's life and work, as well as a comprehensive bibliography of Burling's publications (as of 2015).

== Personal life ==
Shortly after finishing college, Burling married Sibyl (née Straub). Together they had three children: Stephen, Helen (Nono), and Adele.

On January 2, 2021, Burling died at the age of 94 in his home in Michigan.
