= Doyang Hydro Electric Project =

Abandoned Hydro Power Project in Nagaland, India

The Doyang Hydro Electric Project is a NTPC NEEPCO owned hydro power project situated on the River Doyang (a tributary of the River Brahmaputra) located in the Wokha District of Nagaland. It was commissioned in the year 2000 and the total installed capacity of the project is 75 (3 X 25) MW. In the decades since its commissioning, the project has fallen into disrepair. The hydro power project has maintained a housing colony for the employees since its inception. As the state steadily withdraws from public sector enterprises, the maintenance and repairs of the project and the housing colony have suffered. The project remains in a state of steady disintegration, and with the level of malfunctioning of infrastructure, infrastructure asserts its visibility and has become central to the sight. The Doyang Hydro Electric Project is the only major river dam in Nagaland.
