= Kohima Chiethu Airport =

- IATA: none; ICAO: none

Summary
- Airport type: Public
- Owner: Airports Authority of India
- Serves: Kohima
- Location: Chiethu, Kohima District, Nagaland, India
- Elevation AMSL: 4,658 ft (1,420 m)
- Coordinates: 25°46′42″N 94°10′18″E

Map
- Location within Nagaland Location within India

Runways
Direction	Length		Surface
Direction	ft	m	Surface
05/23	13,123	4,000	Under Construction

Kohima Chiethu Airport is a greenfield airport currently under construction at Chiethu, 25 kilometres north of Kohima, the capital of Nagaland in India. It will operate as a second airport for Nagaland with the existing Dimapur Airport continuing to operate. The new airport is being built by the Airports Authority of India (AAI) over an area of 645 acres.

== Status updates ==
- In 2006, the central government carried out a field assessment for the project. The report was later “nullified” as the feasibility report was found to be “unclear”.
- In 2020, the Airports Authority of India agreed to prepare a detailed project report (DPR) of the Kohima Chiethu Airport.
- On 15 July 2021, the Ministry of Defence issued a "no-objection certificate" (NOC) for the proposed airport at Chiethu, Kohima.

== See also ==
- List of airports in Nagaland
- List of airports in India
