= Sanjay Barbora =

Assamese Sociologist

- (Xonzoi)
- Born: 11 February 1973 (age 53)

Academic background
- Education: North-Eastern Hill University, Delhi School of Economics, Elphinstone College, Mumbai, St. Edmund's School, Shillong
- Thesis: Land, Class and Ethnicity: Permutations of Environmental Conflicts in Two Districts of Assam

Academic work
- Discipline: Sociology
- Sub-discipline: Anthropocene, social movements
- Institutions: University of California, Santa CruzTata Institute of Social Sciences, Guwahati

Sanjay (Xonzoi) Barbora is an associate professor at University of California, Santa Cruz. Earlier, he worked as professor at the Tata Institute of Social Sciences Guwahati and was the dean of School of Social Sciences. He is the co-founder of North Eastern Social Research Centre.

== Early life ==
On 11 February 1973, Sanjay was born in Christian Mission Hospital in Jorhat. His father, Bijoy Chandra Barbora, retired as the director of the Tocklai Tea Research Institute in 1997.

Barbora completed his BA in Sociology from Elphinstone College under Mumbai University. He then received his MA and MPhil from the Department of Sociology at Delhi School of Economics. His MPhil thesis title was Plantation Systems and Labour Movements in Assam, 1826-1947. He was awarded PhD from North-Eastern Hill University in 2007 for his thesis, Land, class, ethnicity: Permutation of environmental conflicts in two districts of Assam.

== Career ==
In 2000, Barbora helped start the North Eastern Social Research Centre (NESRC) in Guwahati with Walter Fernandes. Later, he joined the Board of Trustees for NESRC. From 2005-2011, Barbora worked in various capacities with Panos South Asia.

=== Academic ===
Barbora joined Tata Institute of Social Sciences' Guwahati campus in 2012 as an associate professor. He was instrumental in designing three courses offered on campus: MA in Peace and Conflict Studies (discontinued since 2024), MA in Sociology and Social Anthropology, and the integrated MPhil-PhD programme. He was promoted as a professor in 2019. Since 2013, Barbora has been on the editorial board of the peer-reviewed journal Refugee Watch. He joined the peer-reviewed journal Conservation and Society as an associate editor in 2017.

In September 2023 Barbora joined University of California, Santa Cruz's Sociology department in the Social Sciences Division. In the department, he is part of two research focus: Political Economies and Ecologies, and World Building, Political Imaginaries, and Alternative Futures. Barbora is an Honorary Research Fellow at the NESRC. He is a research affiliate at The Initiative for Peacebuilding, University of Melbourne. Previously, he was on the board of trustees of The Kohima Institute (now, The Highland Institute).

== Research ==
Barbora's research focuses on agrarian change, human rights, conservation, media, peace building, and citizenship.

=== Agrarian change ===
- (with Erik de Maaker and Dolly Kikon) "Shifting Ground? State and market in the uplands of Northeast India" in The Newsletter, International Institute for Asian Studies (73), Spring 2016. pp. 6–7.
- "Life After Empires: Comparing Trajectories of Workers in Plantations (Assam) and Kolkhozes (Kyrgyzstan)", in Refugee Watch: A South Asian Journal on Forced Migration, (38), (December 2011); pp. 32–46.
- "Struggles in the Tea Plantations of Assam: Then and Now", in Revolutionary Democracy, 5 (1), April 1999.
- "Violence, Agrarian Change and the Politics of Autonomy in Assam" in B. Karlsson, M. Vandenhelsken and M. Barkataki-Ruscheweyh (Eds), Geographies of Difference: Identity, Society and Landscapes in Northeast India, London: Routledge (2017). pp. 128–149.

=== Conservation ===
- (with Dolly Kikon) "The rehabilitation zone: Living with lemons and elephants in Assam", in Environment and Planning E: Nature and Space, 4 (3). pp. 1121–1138.
- "Riding the Rhino: Conservation, Conflicts and Militarisation of Kaziranga National Park in Assam", in Antipode: A Radical Journal of Geography, 49 (5). pp. 1145–1163.

=== Media ===
- "Media and Minorities in the United Kingdom" in Subir Bhaumik (Ed). Counter-Gaze: Media, Migrants, Minorities, Frontpage: London and Kolkata. pp. 66–75. (2010).

=== Human rights and Peace building ===
- "After counter-insurgency: policing dissent in Assam" in Seminar, 640 (Assam: Unstable Peace), December 2012. pp. 63–67.
- "Autonomous Councils And/Or Ethnic Homelands: An Ethnographic Account of the Genesis of Political Violence in Assam (Northeast India) Against the Normative Frame of the Indian Constitution" in International Journal on Minority and Group Rights 15 (2-3). 2008. pp. 313–334.
- "Rethinking India’s Counter-insurgency Campaign in North-East", in Economic and Political Weekly, XLI (35); pp. 3805–3812 (September 2006).
- "Labouring Conflicts in Karbi Anglong", in Labour File 2 (3). New Delhi: May–June, 2004. 21-24.
- "Ethnic politics and land use: Genesis of conflicts in India’s North-East", in Economic and Political Weekly, 37 (13), 30 March 2002. pp. 1285–1292.
- "Planter Raj to Police Raj", in Revolutionary Democracy, 5(2), September 2000.
- "Autonomy in the Northeast: The Frontiers of Centralised Politics", in Ranabir Samaddar (Ed), The Politics of Autonomy: Indian Experiences, New Delhi: Sage Publications. 2005.
- "Peace Process in Assam: Some Considerations", in Imdad Hussain (Ed), The Guwahati Declaration and the Road to Peace in Assam, New Delhi: Akansha Publications. 2005.
- "Unearthing a Terrible Beauty: Violence and the Politics of Choices in Assam" in K. Kannabiran (Ed), Violence and its Habitations in South Asia, New Delhi: Oxford University Press (2016). pp. 276–294.
- (With Saba Sharma) "Survivors of Ethnic Conflict" in Harsh Mander (Ed), India Exclusion Report, New Delhi: Yoda Press (2016).
- "Weary of Wars: Memory, Violence and Women in the Making of Contemporary Assam" in Uma Chakravarti (Ed), Sexual violence and impunity, Vol. 1, New Delhi: Zubaan Publishers (2016).
- "Seven Sisters" in Gita Dharampal-Frick, Monica Kirloskar-Steinbach, Rachel Dwyer and Jahnavi Phalkey (Eds), Key Concepts in Modern Indian Studies, New Delhi: Oxford University Press (2015).
- "Road to Resentment: Impunity and its impact on notions of community in Assam" in Patrick Hoenig and Navsharan Singh (Ed). Understanding Impunity in South Asia, New Delhi: Zubaan (2014). pp. 110–127.
- "Autonomy in India’s Northeast: The Frontiers of Centralised Politics" in Thomas Benedikter (Ed). Solving Ethnic Conflicts Through Self-governance, Bolzano/Bolzen: Eurasia-Net. pp. 80–85. (2009)
- "Natural Resources Contested in Autonomous Councils: Assessing the Causes of Ethnic Conflict in North-East India" in Urs Geiser and Stephan Rist (Ed). Decentralisation Meets Local Complexity:Local Struggles, State Decentralisation and Access to Natural Resources in South Asia and Latin America, Bern: National Centre of Competence in Research (North-South). pp. 191–210. (2009)
- (With Walter Fernandes) "Development, Displacement and the Right to Life" in Samir Kumar Das (Ed). Blisters on their feet: Tales of Internally Displaced Persons in India's North-East, New Delhi: Sage Publication. pp 314–336. (2008).

=== Citizenship ===
- “National Register of Citizens: Politics and Problems in Assam” in Explorations, 3 (2). pp 3–28. (October 2019).
- "The Crises of Citizenship in Assam" in The India Forum, (Published online on 8 March 2019).
- "Uneasy Homecomings: Political Entanglements in Contemporary Assam" in South Asia: journal of South Asian Studies, 38 (2), 290-309 (2015).
- "Assam’s New Voice of Dissent", in Economic and Political Weekly, (July 9, 2011), 46(28). pp. 19–22.
- (With Susan Thieme, Karin A. Siegmann, Vineeta Menon and Ganesh Gurung). 2008. "Migration matters in South Asia: Commonalities and critiques" in Economic and Political Weekly 43(24):57-65.

=== Others themes ===
- "Remaking Dibrugarh in Contemporary Assam" in The Newsletter Summer Issue (77), 2017. Pp. 40.
- "Remember Easter of 1916? When the Irish Declared a Republic" in Economic and Political Weekly, 51 (25), 16 June 2016. pp. 25–28.

== Books ==
=== Homeland Insecurities: Autonomy, Conflict, and Migration in Assam ===
Barbora's book, Homeland Insecurities, explores Assam's political and social issues that have shaped life in the past two decades. Based in Northeast India, he engages with citizenship, autonomy, conservation, and reconciliation. These are overdetermined by militarisation of crucial spaces of debate and dialogue within civil society.

Manta Wangsu reviews the book as "an honest scholarly intervention at a time when Assam is yet to overcome the National Register of Citizens (NRC) and Citizenship Amendment Act (CAA) anxieties that are set to exclude millions of people." Wangsu adds, "he brings out the complex realities and voices from the margins and also captures the intimate linkages of micro and macro processes." Sociologist Nazimuddin Siddique calls the book, "a significant contribution towards understanding contemporary Assam." Derhasat Narzary reviews, "the book provides a profound and thorough exploration, offering valuable insights into the intricate issues that have persistently affected Assam over the decades.... comprehending the multifaceted dynamics of autonomy, conflict, and migration in the region." In another review essay, Narzary writes, "[Barbora's] interdisciplinary approach, drawing on sociology, anthropology, and political science, allows for a nuanced examination of the complexities of belonging in a region marked by ethnic, cultural, and historical diversity."

== Documentary movies ==
- (With Kazimuddin Ahmed) 2008-9. Football Reconciliation (20 minute documentary on the reconciliation process between different Naga armed groups in Northeast India). Panos South Asia documentary. The documentary has been screened in Zurich, New Delhi, Kohima, Dimapur, Guwahati and has now been handed over to the Forum for Naga Reconciliation (FNR) for distribution and dissemination.
- (With Susan Thieme). 2008. The other Silk Road (28 min documentary on labour migration in post-Soviet Central Asia, especially Kyrgyzstan and Kazakhstan). NCCR North-South and PANOS South Asia. (The film was screened in Kathmandu, Kohima, Stanford University, Berkeley, New York, Bern, Zurich and Bishkek).

== Radio ==
- Co-hosted and produced with Preeti Mangalasekhar for KPFA, Berkeley: APEX Express show (2011).
- Interview with Mr. Kyaw Zwa Moe (Managing Editor of Irrawady News, Chiangmai, Thailand) on the fallout of Burma's elections of 7 November 2010.
- Interview with Dr. Bishnu Raj Upreti, (South Asia regional coordinator for National Centre for Competence and Research, north–south) and Ms. Anita Bhattarai-Ghimire, (research scholar, Kathmandu University) on the state of internally displaced persons in Nepal, January 2010.
- Interview with Mr. Nurul Kabir (editor, New Age, Bangladesh) on the political situation in Bangladesh, October 2008.
- Interview with Dr. Walter Fernandes (director, North Eastern Social Research Centre, Guwahati), Mr. C.R. Bijoy and Mr. Shankar Gopalakrishnan (Campaign for Survival and Dignity) on the impact and implications of Forest Dwellers’ Act, 2006 passed by the Government of India, January 2008.

== Personal life ==
Barbora is married to Dolly Kikon, director of the Center for South Asian Studies at University of California, Santa Cruz.
