= Trance Effect =

Indian pop rock band from Nagaland

- Origin: Dimapur, Nagaland, India
- Genres: Pop rock; indie rock; alternative rock
- Years active: 2017–present
- Members: Iuli Yeptho; Tako Chang; Temsujungba Jamir; Sosang Lkr; Imnamaong Imchen

Trance Effect is an Indian pop rock band from Nagaland, formed in 2017. The band consists of Iuli Yeptho (lead vocals), Tako Chang (guitarist), Temsujungba Jamir (guitarist), Sosang Lkr (drums), Imnamaong Imchen (bassist).

== History ==
Trance Effect was formed in 2017.

The band gained wider recognition with the release of its EP Clowns (2020), which won the Editor's Choice award for Best EP/Album at the Indian Music Diaries Awards 2021.

At the 2021 MG Music Awards, the band's song "Clowns" received the Song of the Year and Best Music Video awards.

In 2026, Trance Effect became the first band from Nagaland to perform on the main stage of Lollapalooza India.

== Members ==
Current

- Iuli Yeptho – vocals
- Tako Chang – guitar
- Temsujungba Jamir – guitar
- Sosang Lkr – drums
- Imnamaong Imchen – bass

== Discography ==
Studio albums

- ARE WE THERE YET? (2024)

EPs

- "Clowns" (2020)

Singles

- "Stop Pretending" (2018)
- "favourite mistake" (Acoustic) (2021)
- "I'm On Your Side" (2021)
- "We're Gonna Make It" (2022)
- "Blue Sweatshirt" (2023)
- "Overrated" (2024)
- "Come Together" (Official Song of the 25th Hornbill Festival) (2025)
- "Fighting" (2025)
- "Find Me" (featuring MongDoll) (2025)

== Awards and nominations ==
Awards and nominations for Trance Effect
Year	Award	Category	Recipients and nominees	Result	Ref.
2021	2021 MG Music Awards	Song of the Year	"Clowns"	Won	
2021	2021 MG Music Awards	Best Music Video	"Clowns"	Nominated	
2021	Indian Music Diaries Awards	Best EP/Album (Editor's Choice)	"Clowns"	Won	
