= Doyang =

River in India

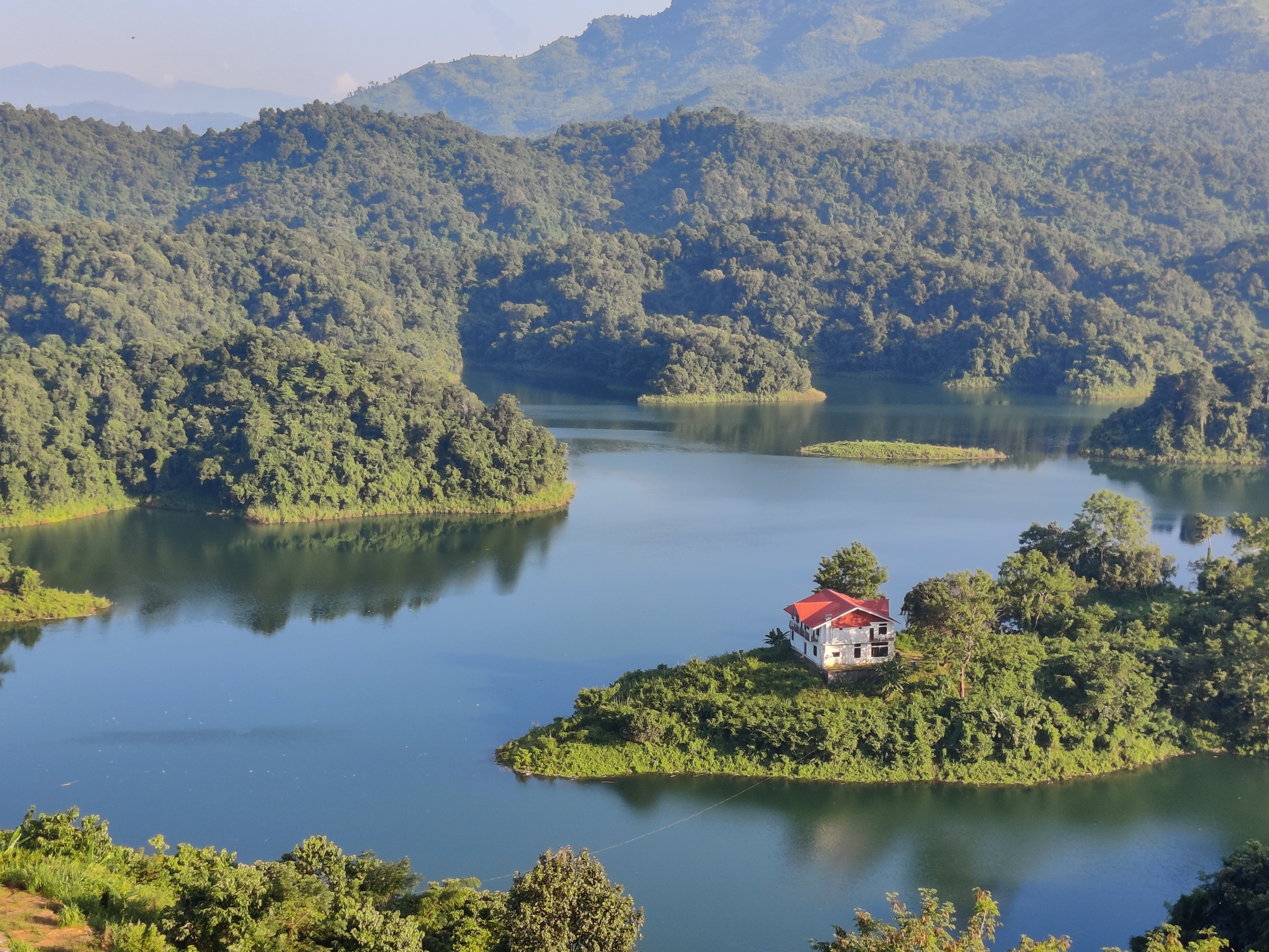
- Doyang Lake Dam

Physical characteristics
- Mouth: Dhansiri
  - coordinates: 26°15′55″N 93°34′16″E
- Length: 150 km (93 mi)

Basin features
- Progression: Dzüü–Sidzü→ Doyang→ Dhansiri→ Brahmaputra→Bay of Bengal

The Doyang is the longest and largest river in the Indian state of Nagaland. With its origin from small streams near the Nagaland–Assam border, it first flows to form the River Dzüü and Sidzü which flows in a parallel direction in Kohima District and Phek District to meet at the Zünheboto District. It then flows to Wokha District where it is known by its name, the Doyang and moves south west direction and then north in Assam to join the Dhansiri which together in turn is a left tributary of the Brahmaputra.

== Dams ==
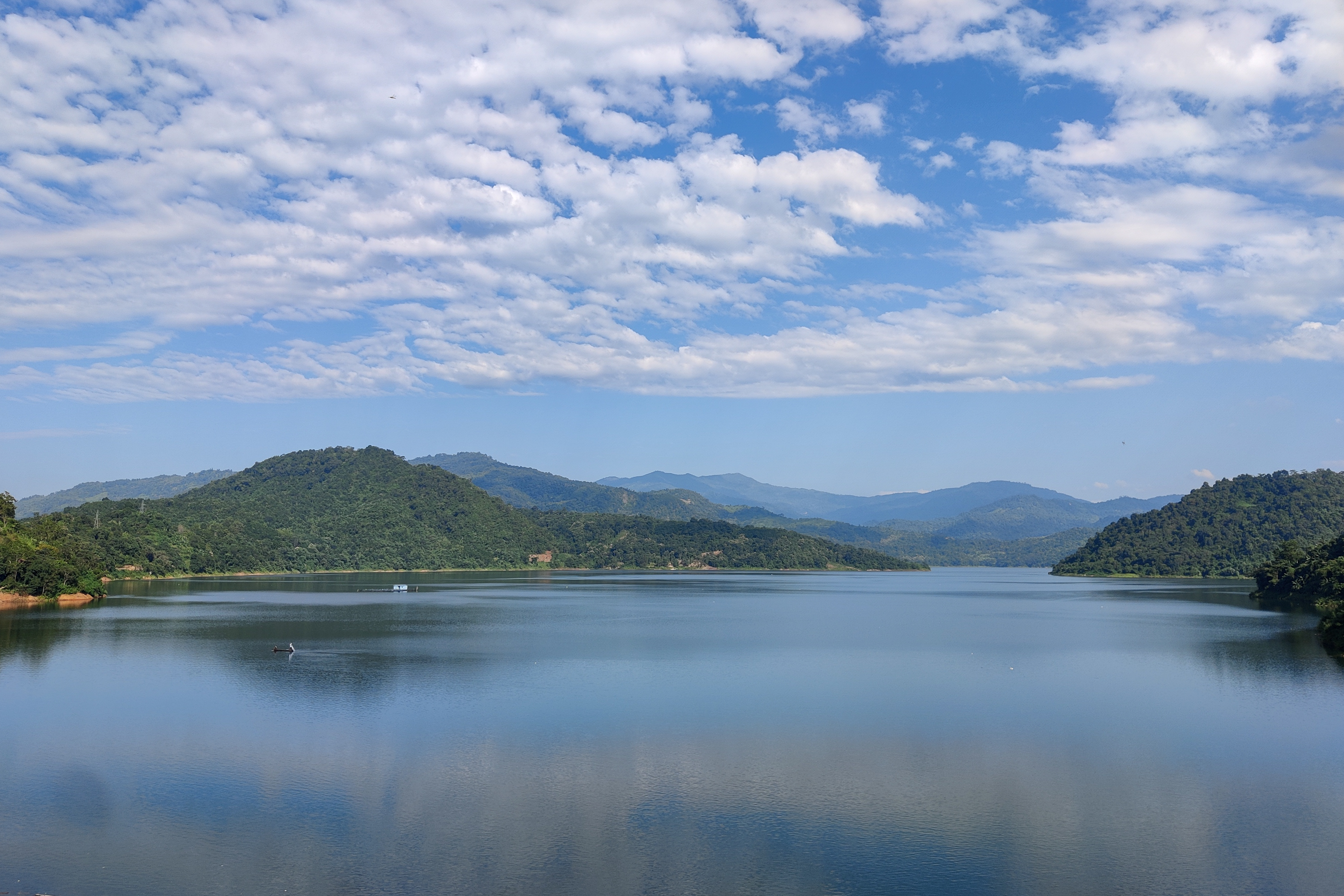
Doyang Dam Lake

The Doyang Hydro Electric Project is the only major river dam in Nagaland. It was commissioned in the year 2000 and the total installed capacity of the project is 75 (3 X 25) MW.

== See also ==
- List of rivers in Nagaland
