= Abdon Mech =

Indian singer-songwriter from Nagaland

- Born: Dimapur, Nagaland, India
- Occupation: Singer-songwriter
- Years active: 2020–present
- Musical career
- Origin: Dimapur, Nagaland, India
- Genre: Indie pop
- Website: abdonmech.com

Abdon Mech is an Indian singer-songwriter from Nagaland. He released of his debut single "Again" in 2020 and his debut EP "From a Bamboo Room" in 2021.

Mech has performed alongside international artists including John Mayer during his India concert in 2026.

== Early life ==
Abdon Mech was born in Dimapur, Nagaland. Mech grew up in a musical family, with both of his parents and sister being musicians. Although exposed to music from childhood, he began pursuing songwriting seriously during his university years after initially aspiring to become a footballer.

== Career ==
Mech released his debut single, Again, in August 2020.

In 2021, he released his debut extended play, From a Bamboo Room.

Mech won two awards at the 2021 MG Music Awards, including Best Music Video.

In 2025, he represented India at the Artisjus Songbook Camp in Budapest through support from the Indian Performing Right Society (IPRS) and Task Force for Music and Arts (TaFMA).

In 2026, Mech opened for American musician John Mayer during the latter's concert in Mumbai. The same year he was included in GQ India's Most Influential Young Indians list.

== Discography ==
Extended plays

- From a Bamboo Room (2021)
- Not Overthinking This (2025)

Singles

- "Again" (2020)
- "Give Me My Soul Back"

== Awards and nominations ==
Awards and nominations for Abdon Mech
Year	Award	Category	Recipients and nominees	Result	Ref.
2021	2021 MG Music Awards	Best Music Video	"Give Me My Soul Back"	Won	
2021	2021 MG Music Awards	Best Indie Song	"Again"	Won	
