= Ruopfüzhano Whiso =

Indian model and beauty pageant titleholder

- Born: Khonoma, Nagaland, India
- Education: Indira Gandhi National Open University
- Occupations: Model; entrepreneur; television host
- Beauty pageant titleholder
- Title: Miss Kohima 2017; Femina Miss India Nagaland 2018
- Major competitions: Femina Miss India 2018; Miss Universe India 2024 (4th runner-up)

Ruopfüzhano Whiso is an Indian model, entrepreneur, and television host from Nagaland. She was the fourth runner-up at Miss Universe India 2024, becoming the first contestant from Northeast India to reach the top five of the pageant.

== Early life ==
Whiso is from Khonoma village in Nagaland and completed a master's degree in English from the Indira Gandhi National Open University.

== Career ==
Whiso began competing in pageants at the age of eighteen. She was crowned Miss Kohima 2017 and was the first runner-up at Miss Nagaland 2017. She participated in Femina Miss India 2018, representing Nagaland.

In July 2024, Whiso was selected from an open audition of 19 candidates for Miss Universe Nagaland conducted by the Beauty and Aesthetics Society of Nagaland. At the finale held in Jaipur in September 2024, she finished as the fourth runner-up, becoming the first representative from Nagaland and the Northeast to reach the top five of the competition.
