= Wokha =

Town in Nagaland, India

- Town
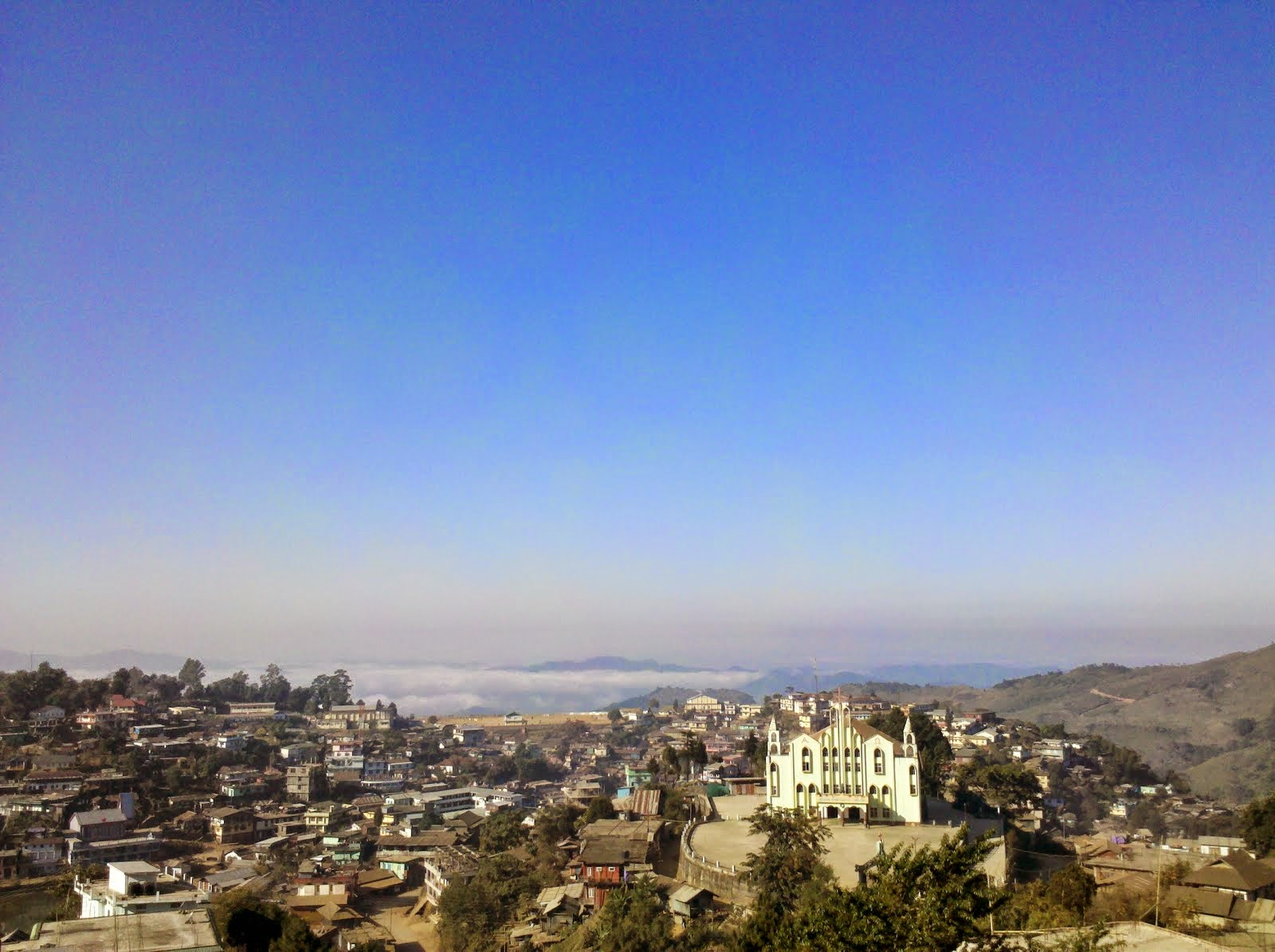
- View of Wokha town
- Nickname: Land of Plenty
- Location in Nagaland
- Coordinates: 26.1°N 94.27°E
- Country: India
- State: Nagaland
- District: Wokha District
- Elevation: 1,313 m (4,308 ft)

Population (2011)
  - Total: 35,004

Languages
  - Official: English
  - Major language: Lotha
- Time zone: UTC+5:30 (IST)
- Postal code: 797111
- Vehicle registration: NL-05
- Website: nagaland.gov.in

Wokha is a town and municipality in the Indian state of Nagaland. It is the headquarters of Wokha District and is located about 75 km north of the state capital, Kohima. Wokha literally means head count or census in the Lotha language. It has a population of 35,004 and is predominantly inhabited by the Lotha Nagas.

== History ==
Wokha was made as the district headquarters of the Naga hills under Assam by the British in 1876. By 1878, the headquarters was shifted to Kohima, but Wokha remained a subdivision. Later in 1889, the subdivision was shifted to Mokokchung. After India's independence, Wokha became a sub division in 1957 under Naga Hills Tuensang Area, and remained so till she became a district in 1973.

== Geography and climate ==
Wokha is located at 26.1°N 94.27°E at an average elevation of 1,313 metres (4,793 feet). It has a warm temperate climate (classified as Cwa by Köppen and Geiger). The summer temperature of Wokha ranges from 16.1 °C to 32 °C. The winter temperature reaches a minimum of 2 °C. The average annual temperature in Wokha is 17.8 °C. The average annual rainfall is 1940 mm.

== Demographics ==
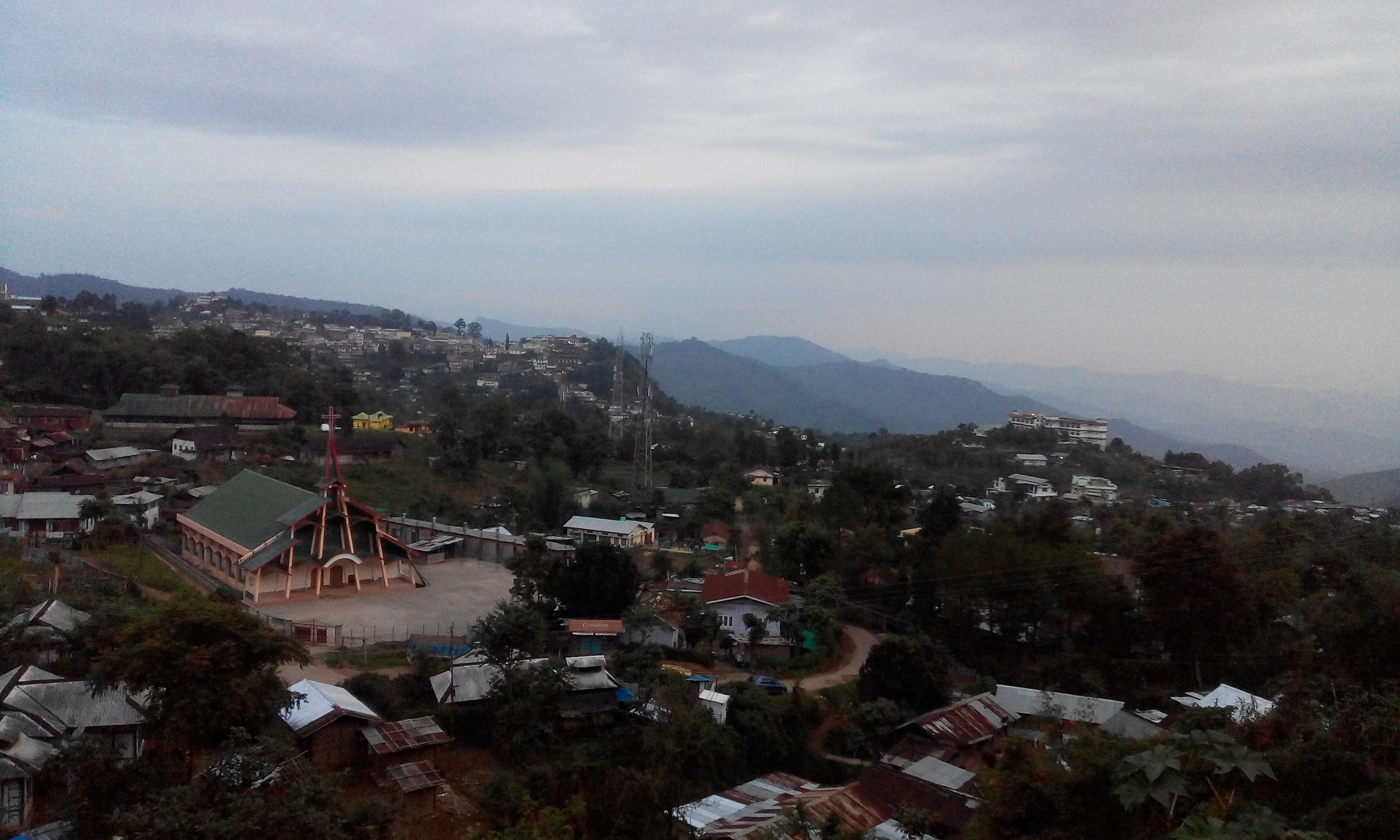
Part of Wokha Town

Wokha is the third largest town in Nagaland after Dimapur and Kohima. According to the 2011 census, the population is 35,004. Wokha has an average literacy rate of 96%; male literacy is 97%, while female literacy is 95%. In Wokha, 10.57% of the population is under 6 years of age. The majority of the population is Christian (at 92%), with notable minorities following Hinduism (5%) and Islam (2%).

Lotha (also native language of the region) is the most widely used language, while Nagamese and English are also spoken.

== Tourism ==
Wokha's agglomeration consists of Wokha town, Longsa village, Wokha village and Vakhosung. Wokha is on the main route from Kohima to Mokokchung and was one of the earliest locations of the Assam Rifles. The Government of Nagaland constructed a tourist lodge in Wokha Town. The annual Amur falcon migration passes Doyang Dam, which is a 2-hour drive away. It also hosts the oldest cricket tournament in North East India, The Winter Cricket Challenge.

== Transportation ==
The nearest railhead is Furkating Railway Station in Golaghat, Assam, and the nearest airport is Dimapur Airport (IATA: DMU, ICAO: VEMR). Taxis and buses are available from every district headquarters in Nagaland to Wokha. There is a helicopter service from Dimapur.

== Myths ==
Mount Tiyi is a hill which has supernatural legends associated with it. Most Nagas believe that this mountain is the abode of departed souls. According to local Lotha folklore, the mountain had an orchard that could only be found by the 'lucky ones.' Rhododendrons are common on Mount Tiyi.
