= Nagaki =

Proposed City in Nagaland

Nagaki Nagaki Global City
- City
- Etymology: Naga naga ki (lit. 'abode of the nagas')
- Interactive map of Nagaki
- Location in Nagaland, India Nagaki (India) Nagaki (Asia) Nagaki (Earth)
- Coordinates: 25.706900°N 93.859322°E
- Country: India
- Region: Northeast India
- State: Nagaland
- District: Chümoukedima District
- Announced: 15 August 2023; 3 years ago

Area
  - Total: 39 km^{2} (15 sq mi)
- Elevation: 250 m (820 ft)
- Time zone: UTC+5:30 (IST)
- Website: nagakicity.com

Nagaki, officially Nagaki Global City, is a proposed planned city located in Chathe Valley in the Chümoukedima District of the Indian state of Nagaland. The project was first announced in 2023.

== Etymology ==
The name Nagaki is derived from Naga, referring to the Naga people and Ki, meaning “house” or “home” in many Naga languages. The name therefore means “Home of the Nagas”.

== Proposal ==
The proposed city is expected to cover an area of approximately 39 square kilometres with the first phase of development focusing on a smaller incubation area intended to establish the core urban infrastructure.

== Transportation ==
=== Air ===
The nearest airport to the site is Dimapur Airport. The proposed Nagaki Rüzaphema International Airport is also expected to serve the planned city once operational.

=== Road ===
==== Highways passing through the site ====
- Asian Highway 1 : Tokyo – Nagaki – Istanbul
- Asian Highway 2 : Denpasar – Nagaki - Khosravi
- NH 29 : Dabaka (Assam) – Nagaki – Jessami (Manipur)

=== Rail ===
The site is connected to the Molvom Railway Station located north of the proposed site.

== See also ==
- Chümoukedima
- Medziphema
