= Dhansiri River =

River in India

Coordinates: 26°40′N 93°45′E

Dhansiri
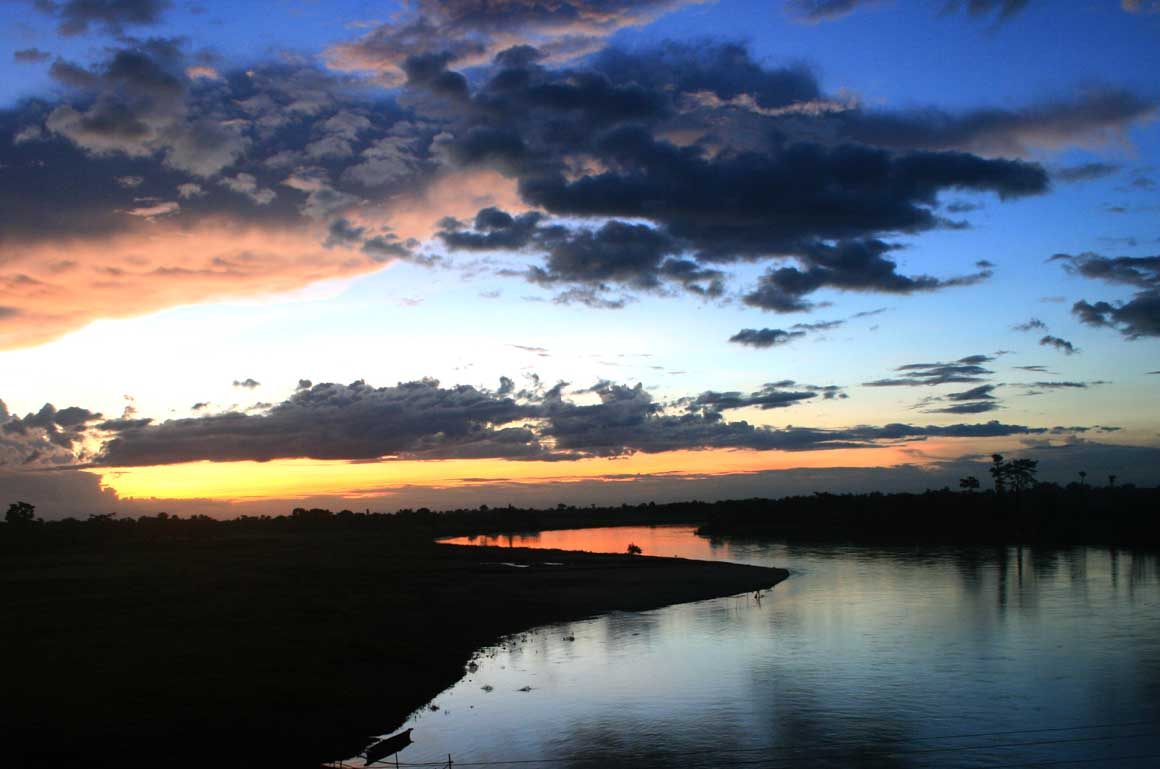
- Dhansiri river near Golaghat

- Mouth of Dhansiri river in Assam, India Dhansiri River (India)

Location
- Country: India
- Location: Assam, Nagaland

Physical characteristics
- Source
  - location: Laisang Peak (Nagaland)
- Mouth
  - location: Brahmaputra River
- Length: 352 km (219 mi)

The Dhansiri is an Indian river of Golaghat District of Assam and the Chümoukedima District and Dimapur District of Nagaland. It originates from Laisang peak of Nagaland. It flows through a distance of 352 kilometres (219 mi) from south to north before joining the Brahmaputra on its south bank. Its total catchment area is 1,220 square kilometres (470 mi^{2}).

== Etymology ==
In Ahom Buranjis, it is mentioned as Khe-Nam-Ti-Ma which means A river coming from watery place. (Khe = A river, Nam = Water, Ti = Place, Ma = Coming)

== Geography ==
While flowing as the boundary between Karbi Anglong and Nagaland, it flanks a large wilderness very rich in wildlife. On one side is the Dhansiri Reserved Forest and on the other Intanki National Park.

It has several types of important wood bearing trees along its bank like Intanki Forest. Dhansari river along with Kapili by headward erosion has completely isolated the Mikir hills from the Peninsular plateau. There are numerous perennially waterlogged swampy region locally known as bils associated with this river.

== Fishes ==
A fish survey conducted in 2011-12 found 34 species of fish belonging to five orders, thirteen families, and 24 genera. Seventeen species of Cypriniformes were found, followed by eight species of Siluriformes. The Dhansiri river in Dimapur has freshwater, semi torrent, hill stream and ornamental fish species.

== See also ==
- List of rivers of Nagaland
