= Wokha district =

- District of Nagaland
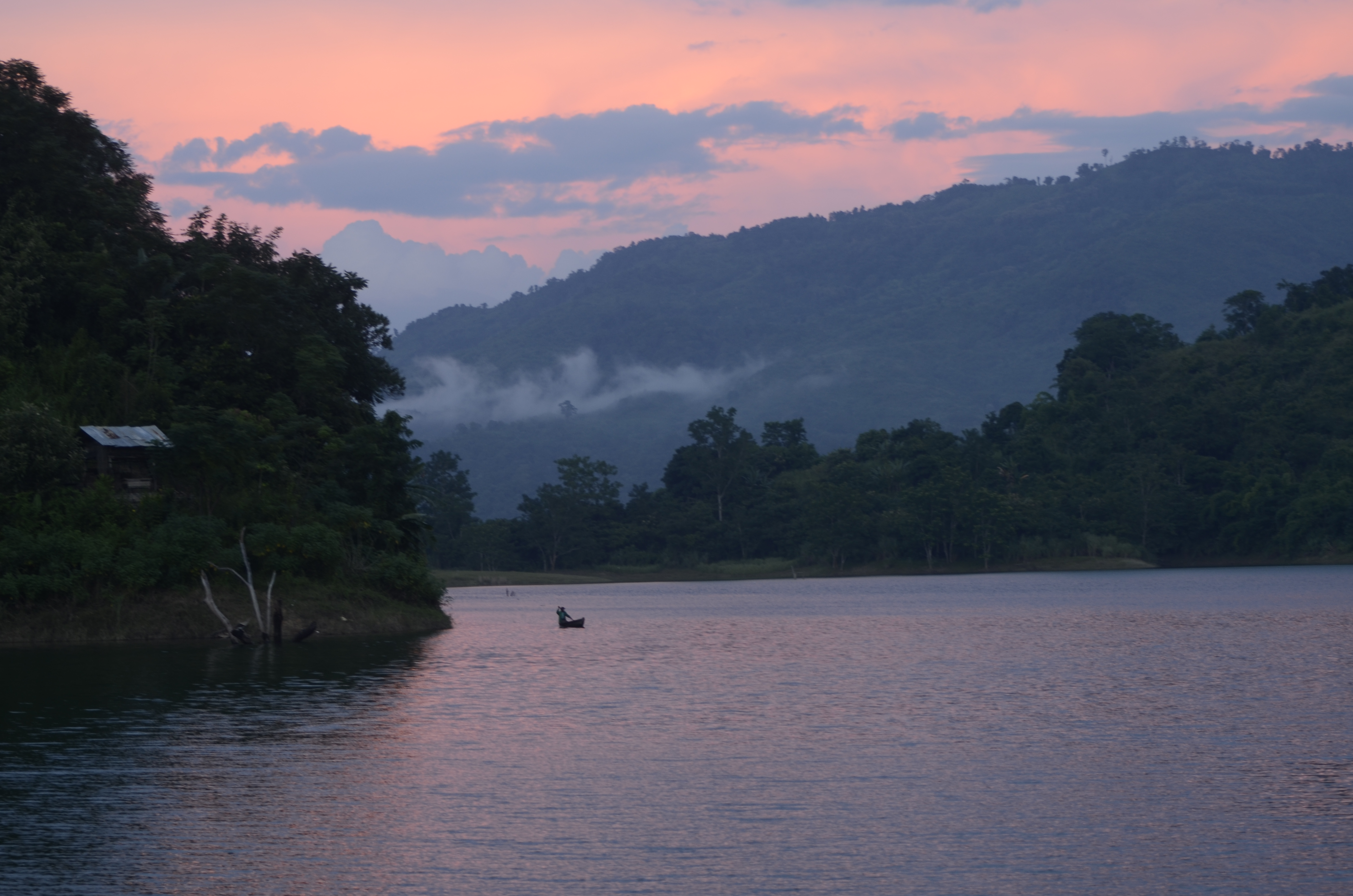
- Doyang Reservoir
- Nickname: Land of Plenty
- Location in Nagaland
- Interactive map of Wokha district
- Coordinates: 26.1°N 94.26°E
- Country: India
- State: Nagaland
- Seat: Wokha

Government
  - Assembly constituencies: 4 constituencies

Area
  - Total: 1,628 km^{2} (629 sq mi)

Population (2011)
  - Total: 166,343
  - Density: 102.2/km^{2} (264.6/sq mi)
- Time zone: UTC+05:30 (IST)
- ISO 3166 code: IN-NL-WO
- Major highways: NH 2
- Website: http://wokha.nic.in/

Wokha district (/ˈwoʊkə/) is a district of Nagaland state in India. The district headquarters is Wokha. It is the home of the Lotha Nagas. Gastronomically, it known for its variety of fermented bamboo shoots (bastenga). It holds an important place as the roosting site of the migratory Amur falcon. Geologically, it has known oil deposits.

== History ==
=== British Colonial Administration ===
In 1844, the first official colonial exploration in the Lotha Naga area was carried out by Captain Brodie. The first recorded meeting between a European and the Lothas was with Lieutenant Biggs in the year 1841. During the British colonial expansion into the Naga Hills, Wokha was designated the district headquarters initially. Two years later, it was shifted to Kohima in 1878, and Wokha was reduced to a sub-division in the colonial administration. The sub-divisional administration shifted its headquarters to Mokokchung, further relegating Wokha in the colonial administration.

=== District of Nagaland ===
In 1957, when the Naga Hills Tuensang Area (NHTA) was formed, Wokha became a sub-division under the Mokokchung District.

The currently defined Wokha District was created in 1973 when the sub-division was separated from Mokokchung District along with six administrative circles. The first census of the new district in 1981 counted the population to be 57,583.

== Geography ==
Wokha District is located in the mid-west part of present state of Nagaland. It is bordered by Mokokchung District to the northeast, Zunheboto District to the southeast, Tseminyü District to the south, Niuland District to the southwest and the Golaghat plains of Assam to the west.

It covers an area of 1,628 sq. km. which equals around 9.82% of the total area of Nagaland. Of the total area, 35.74% comes under subtropical hill zone, 23.64% under subtropical plain zone and 40.59% in the mild tropical hill zone. The average altitude of the Wokha (Upper Range) is 1000-1500m above sea level; Bhandari (Lower Range) is 400-1000m above sea level. While Baghty town is at an altitude of 304.30m above sea level. Wokha town is the highest town at 1313.69m.

Mount Tiyi is the highest peak in the district at an altitude of 1970 metres above sea level. It has a rich biodiversity. Mount Tiyi is of great cultural significance to the Lotha tribe with many legends and myth embedded into the cultural history. Mount Totsü is the second highest peak with an altitude of 1250 metres above the sea level. Both these places are earmarked by the district administration for ecotourism.

The Doyang (also known as Dzüü by the Angami Nagas) is the biggest river in the state, and the district, and flows through the three hill ranges, namely, Bhandari Range, Sanis Range and Wokha Range. It goes further to join the Dhansiri River in the Assam valley. The other three important rivers flowing down its mountains are, Chubi, Nzhu and Nruk. Chubi flows southwards from Mokokchung District and joins Doyang in the Pangti area. Nzhu rises from Tseminyü District, flows through Miphong and joins the Doyang in the Lotsü area. The river Nruk comes from Tseminyü, crosses through Moilan and joins the Doyang. Other waterbodies in the district include small lakes across the ranges. The Totsü Wozhü which is situated in the southern part of the Phiro–Shaki area is the largest amongst these but occupies merely around an acre of land. Other similar natural lakes are situated in the Sanis and Mekokla areas. The lake created by the Doyang Dam is the biggest manmade waterbody in the district. There are no permanent waterfalls in the district though several are formed during the monsoons.

The migratory Amur Falcon (Falcon Amurensis) use the area around Doyang reservoir as a feeding and resting place and around a million gather during the season. The best time to view roosting of the birds is from second week of October to the first week of November.

=== Climate ===
Due to its subtropical topography, the district receives warm rainy summer and cold dry winter. In winter, the average night temperature falls between 4 °C to 2 °C. December and January are the coldest months. The average temperature in the summer months in approximately 27 °C. The district receives an average annual rainfall of 2000mm to 2500mm and rains for around six months in a year with greater intensity in the months of July and August. Although the district receives moderate rainfall, villages at higher elevation face acute scarcity of water due to the high surface runoff leading to less recharge of ground water.

During summer, the average humidity is 85%, which can go uptown 95% to 100%, which makes the monsoon season very damp.

The climate in the Bhandari Range is slightly warmer with little lesser compared to the middle and upper ranges.

== Administration ==
The district has 125 recognized villages. It is further divided into 13 administrative units and 7 rural development blocks. It has three ranges namely, Upper Range covering the Wokha, Wozhüro, Chükitong and Englan Circle, Middle Range covering the Lotsü, Sanis and Aitepyong Circle and Lower Range covering the Bhandari Circle and Ralan area.

During the first assembly election in the state, Wokha (then a sub-division) had five assembly constituencies including the now obsolete, Moilan Wozhuro. After Wokha became a separate district in 1973, it was allotted four assembly constituencies starting from third assembly election. Since then, the district is represented by four assembly constituencies in the Nagaland Legislative Assembly: Tyüi, Wokha, Sanis, and Bhandari.

== Economy ==
The main occupation of the people in the district is agriculture and allied activities. Rice is the main crop.

=== Agriculture ===
The district has a wide-range of soils: recent alluvium, old alluvium, mountains valley lateritic soil, brows forest, and podzolic soils.

Rice is the major food crop and occupies 77% of the total cultivable area. In addition, farmers also grow maize, tapioca, pulses, soya beans and variety of organic vegetables. The district's orange, passion fruit, plum and banana are famous.

It is one of the three districts in Nagaland currently receiving funds from the Backward Regions Grant Fund Programme (BRGF).

== Demographics ==
According to the 2011 census Wokha District has a population of 166,343, roughly equal to the nation of Saint Lucia. This gives it a ranking of 595th in India (out of a total of 640). Wokha District has a sex ratio of 968 females for every 1000 males, and a literacy rate of 87.7%. Scheduled Tribes make up 94.16% of the population. 21.04% of the population live in urban areas.

=== Religion ===
Religions in Wokha district (2011)
Religion	Percent
Christianity	95.13%
Hinduism	3.37%
Islam	1.23%
Other or not stated	0.27%
Distribution of religions

According to the 2011 official census, Christianity is the predominant religion in Wokha District with 158,236 Christians (95.13%), 5,605 Hindus (3.37%), 2,043 Muslims (1.23%), 318 Budhhists (0.19%), 34 Sikhs (0.02%), 8 Jains (<0.01%), 79 did not answer (0.05%) and 20 did Other (0.01%).

=== Languages ===
At the time of the 2011 census, 90.48% of the population spoke Lotha and 1.19% Bengali as their first language.
