= History of Patsho =

Patsho (also spelled Pathso) is a village in the Noklak District of Nagaland, India, situated in the Patkai range near the Indo-Burma border with the village being the westernmost of the Noklak District. The adjoining tribe in the north is Konyak and in the south is Tikhir and in the west of the village or district is Yimkhiung.

== Ancient history ==
The historical account suggest that the Nagas were well-established in their homeland prior to 2nd century AD. The term Nagalogoi is seen in some books which is translated into The realm of the Naked. Apart from this, there are handful source or no written record of the village is found. It is only through folklore and folktales that the picture of how the ancestrals of the village have lived. Verbal history accorded to us are:

=== Communication ===
People communicated only verbally with no written form. The dialect spoken before migration from Khiamnyunga is still obscure, given that there are multiple dialects in Khiamniungan region.

=== Tools ===
Handmade tools like stones or other sharpen wooden tools might have been the primary tools for hunting and gatherings. The renowned traditional tool like dao and spear were also used for headhunting, as a construction tool and other daily activities. In addition Wui village is known for iron smelting. Hence, import or exchanges in the form of trade is expected.

=== Housing ===
Housing materials were usually bamboo, wood, and for roof such as thatch and slates which is black in colour. Houses were built in close structural homes with only little walkways in between to secure from enemy's raid. The account on slate-house buildings is seen in the book of Christoph von Fürer-Haimendorf but only in the 1930s.

=== Clothing ===
The common cloth for men in those days were loincloth or a langot(Īelèi) and the white shawl purely made from cotton locally called Pàpànìe, with no natural dyes.

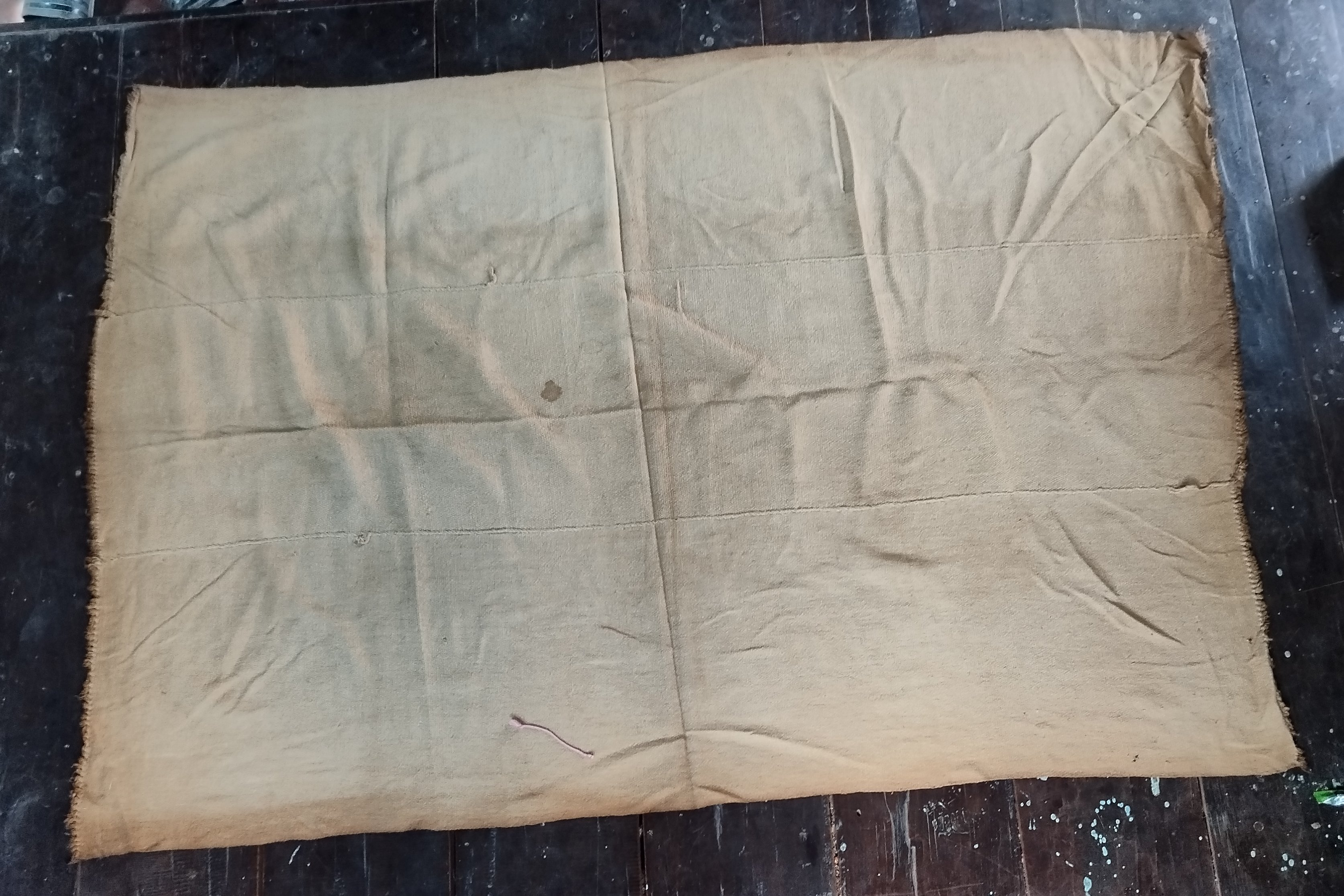
A traditional cotton shawl which is relatively olden and purely made from cotton before any synthetic materials was introduced.

== Middle ages & modern ==
By the time of 12th and 13th century other Naga tribes have already well established trading practice and norms with the introduction of Ahom dynasty led by king Sukapha in Northeast India. But the access to trading route by the villagers might have occurred in a far distant year, given by the clear evidence of difficult terrain and remote region.

According to oral tradition, after the migration from Khiamnyunga the earliest settlement in the village following the prolonged habitation at Lümuoking was Noknyuthang, a small khel (a ward) located between present-day Patsho and Patsho Nokking. This migration might have been accompanied by serious of headhunting exchanges such as sudden raids and attacks on both sides. However, over time, the settlement expanded northward which is towards Iekhau village, and the locality came to be known locally as Patsho, prior to its official designation as Panso (B). The spelling was later altered to Pathso, before the introduction of the Khiamniungan alphabet for Patsho. Today, the currently accepted lexical form is Patsho.

The etymology of the name "Patsho" is obscure, although it may mean "congregation of people." The Patsho people originate from the region of Khiamnyunga, from where a group of people moved towards west to occupy Lümuoking and subsequently inhibited the extant Patsho village.

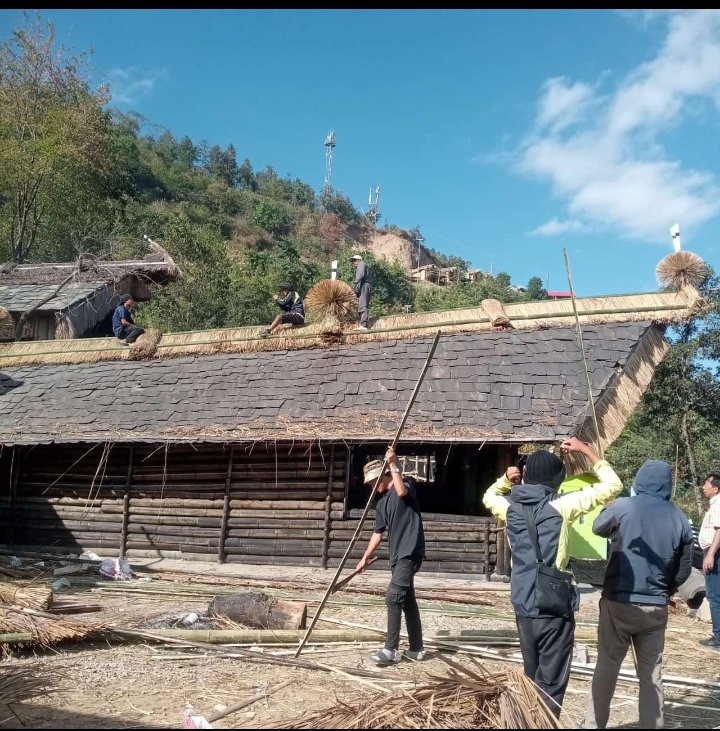
Slate house or Pou/Morung

During the British Raj, the Khiamniungans were referred to as kalyo Kenyu - Slate-House dwellers particularly in the works of anthropologists such as Christoph von Fürer-Haimendorf.

== Modern history ==
=== Pre independence ===
Patsho was largely divided into two khels roughly half a mile apart. Houses were huddled together in order to secure from danger or enemy's raid. Morung with huge logdrum inside and Bamboo or wooden platforms were common. The paths were planted by a trellis of creepers which will act as a defensive mechanism against raiders from either flocking in are escaping the village as if cut down the thorny bushes are dropped to block the path.

Housing

Rooms: Most often the houses have single room with a central hearth, but always two exits as a defense or easy escape.

Furnishings: Small bamboo platforms(machans) we're used for sleeping. Wooden stools and seats locally called nôikhàm were common amongst the villagers

Household items: Unique larger wooden bowls or containers were kept.

Clothing

Protective items: The rest are animal related products usually made from skin and fur. The protective shinguard like hokthie and hokkuo are made from animal skin. The wristguard worn by the villagers in olden days is made by tiny straps of cane or bamboo.

Textiles: Spinning and weaving were practiced but are not to the extent of commercial. This is supported by Christopher Heimendorf of history possessing clothing where most men own only one cloth.

Adornment: Clothing is heavily decorated with large ornaments and cowrie shell figures. Cowrie shells, hornbill feathers, Armlets are some of the precious items of those days. Helmets were common which is made from thick rope coiled into a spiral shape, with old cloth rags stuffed inside as padding to reduce the effect from strike.

=== Post independence ===
There are 22 khels in the village each represented by a village council member. Not all of these khels have Morung and Raises platform as it does in the olden days.

Housing style is relatively modern and import and exports of goods and services is well established. Taste of clothing has changed and the traditional attires have become an outfit of certain social occasions.

Governance of the village administration is changed. During the pre-independence period the village elders from each clan or khel were acting as authorities. Now, the Gaon buras or the council members headed by the Head GB are the village authorities or agent and are liaison between district and the village administration.

== Gallery ==
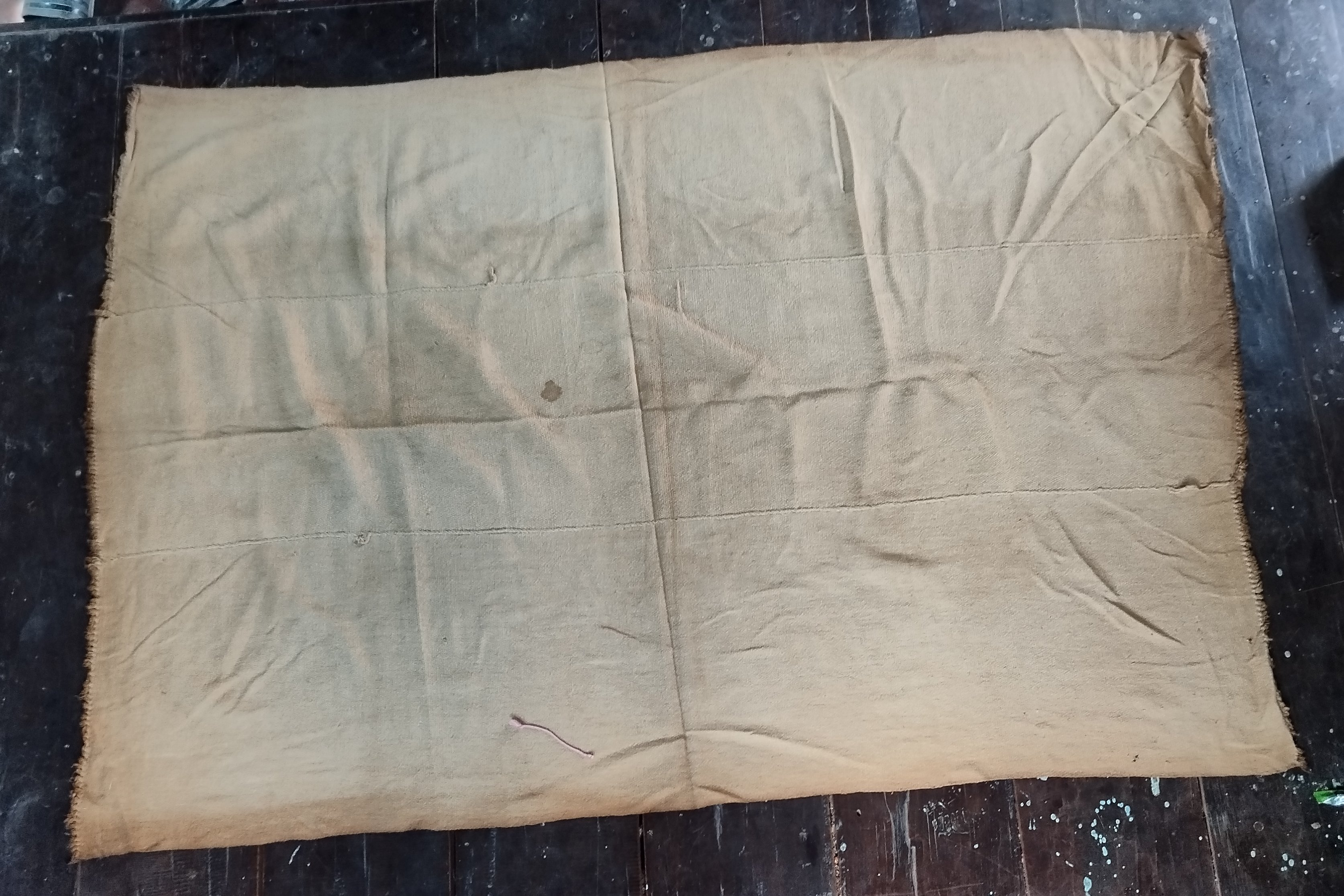
Traditional cotton shawl (Pàpànìe), woven entirely from cotton before synthetic fibres were introduced.

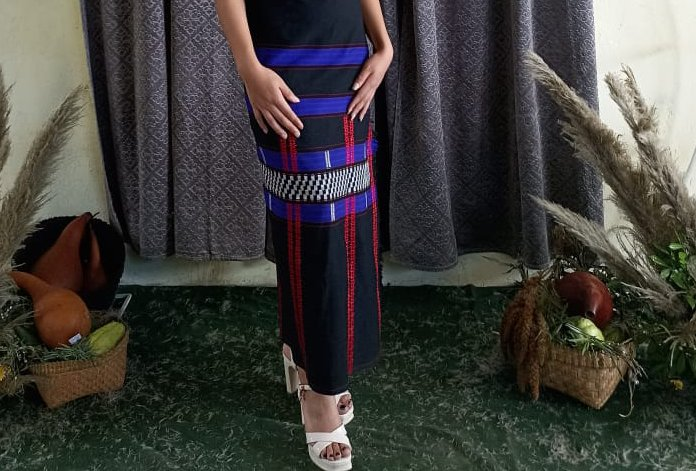
Nüjam (traditional women's wrap or mekhela).

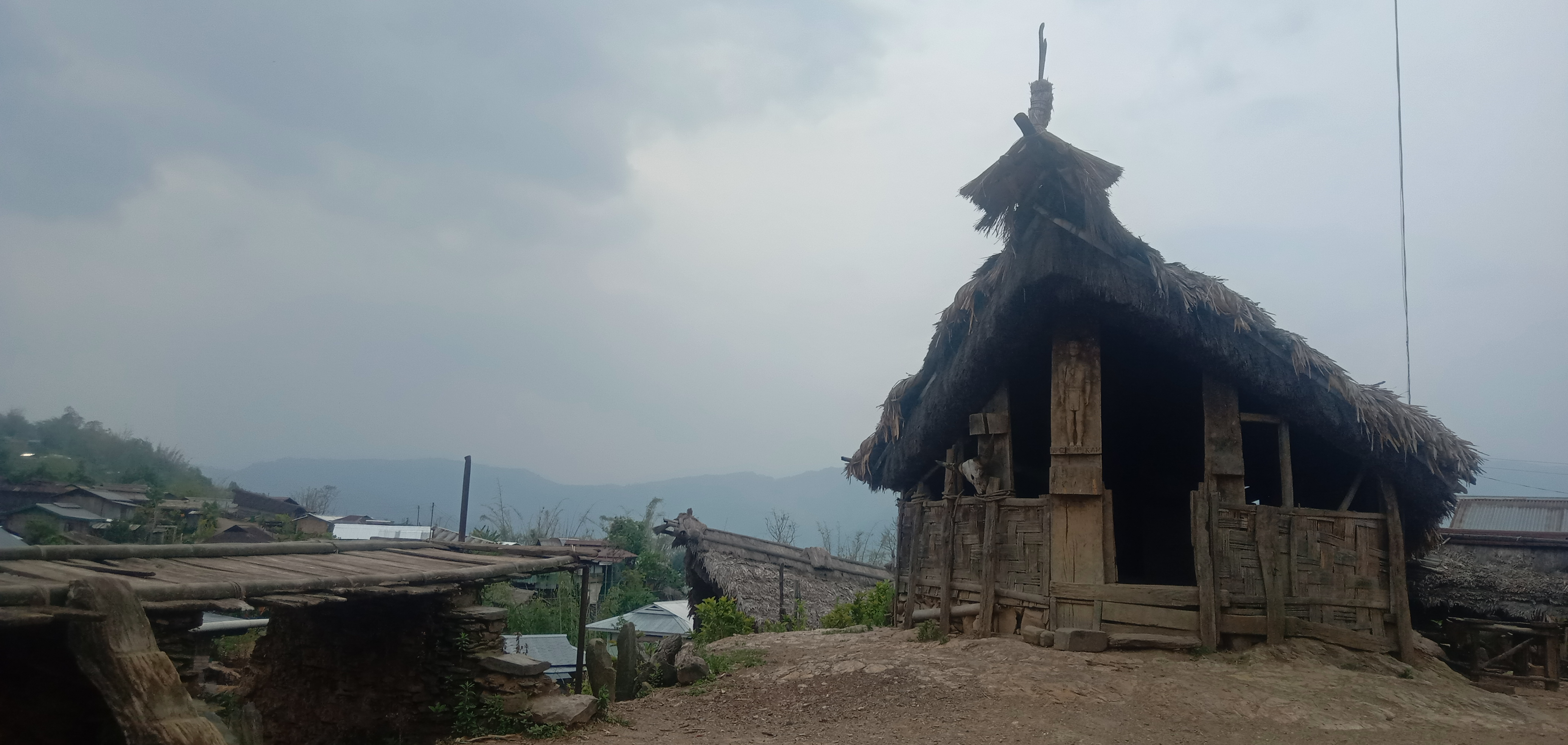
Pou, the traditional youth dormitory.

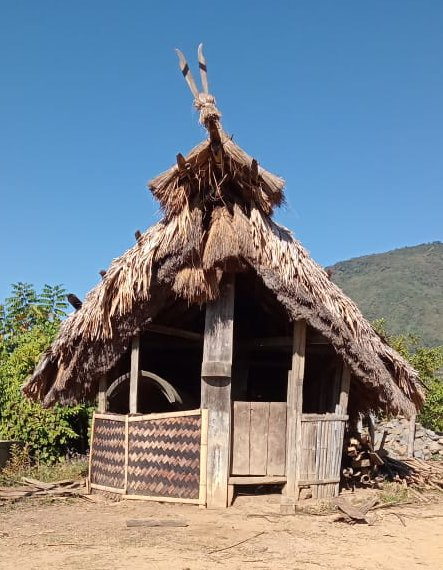
Interior/exterior view of a Pou (youth dormitory).

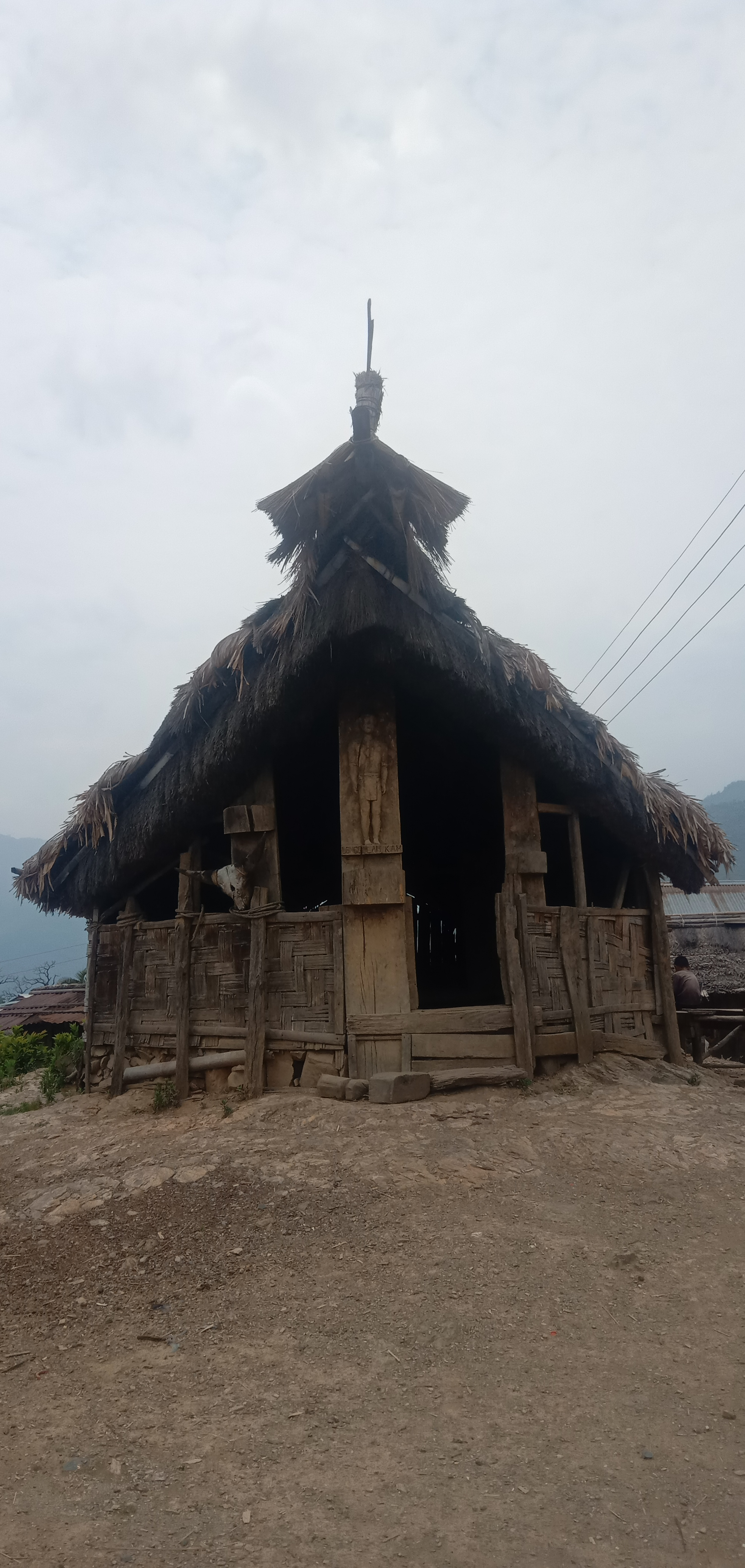
Pou - Khiamniungan dormitory.

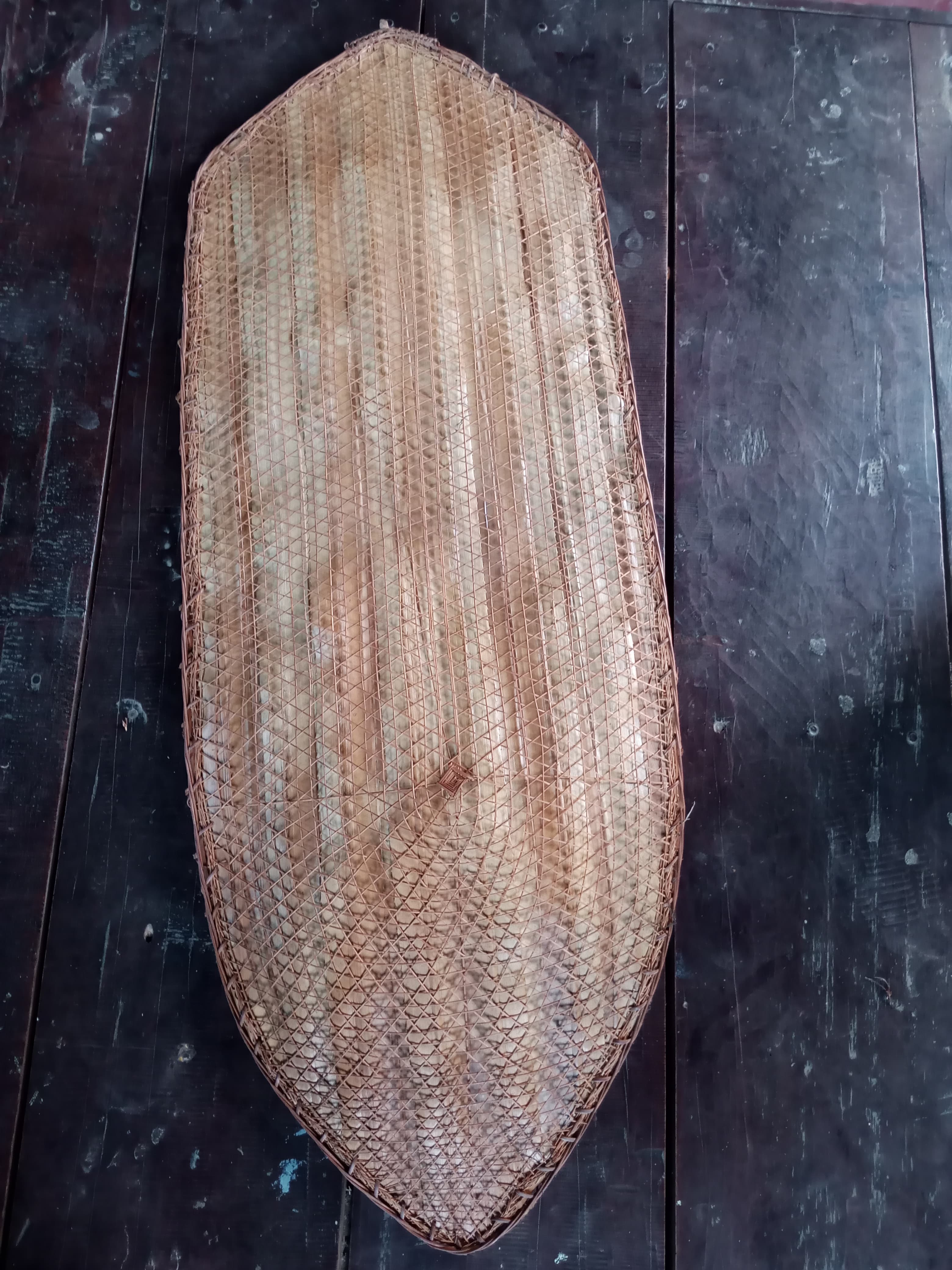
Kēihtsôu, a traditional umbrella made from screw pine leaves.

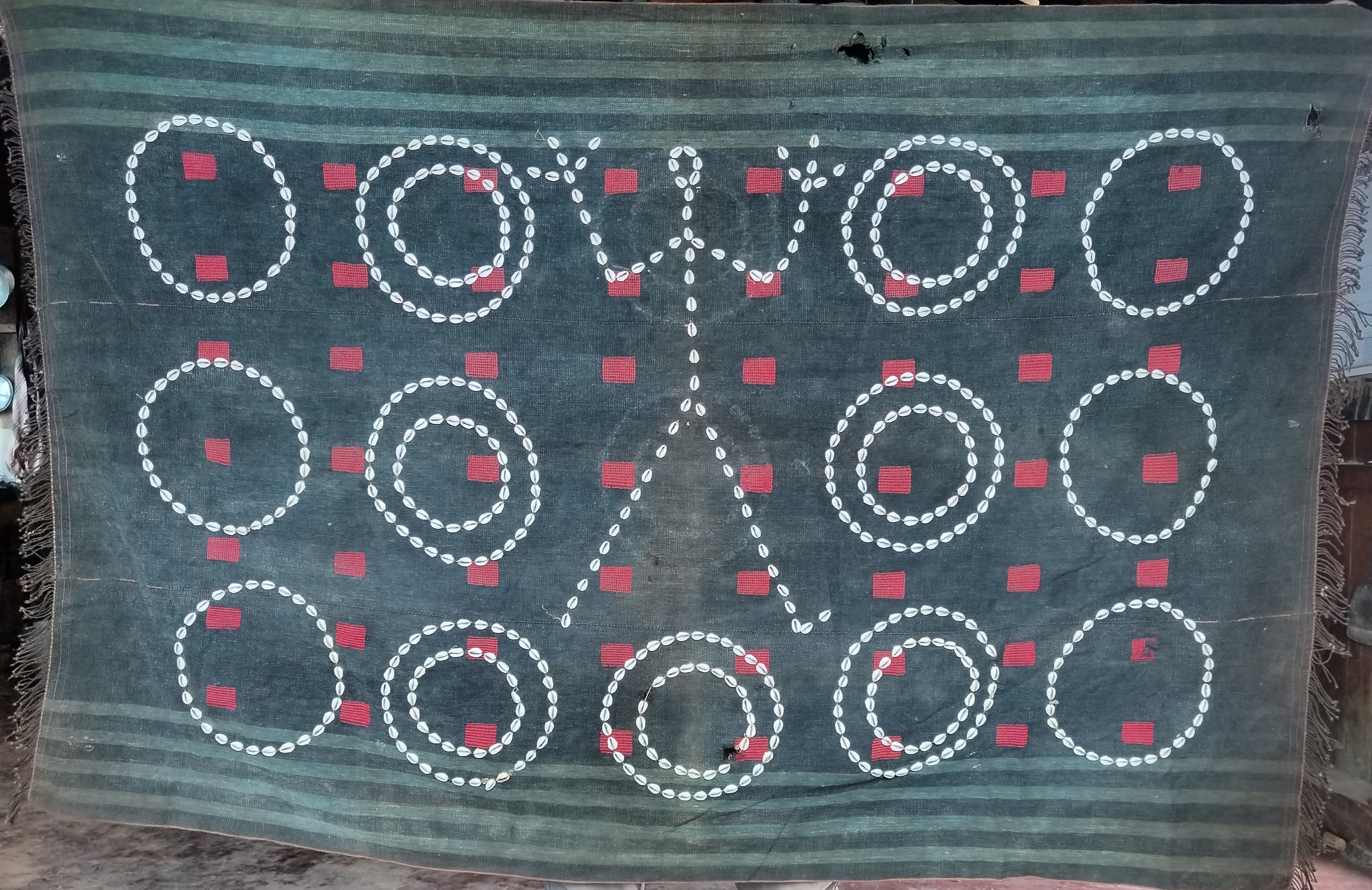
Much older shawl called Shiehtsapnie with cowrie shells forming circles and human figure

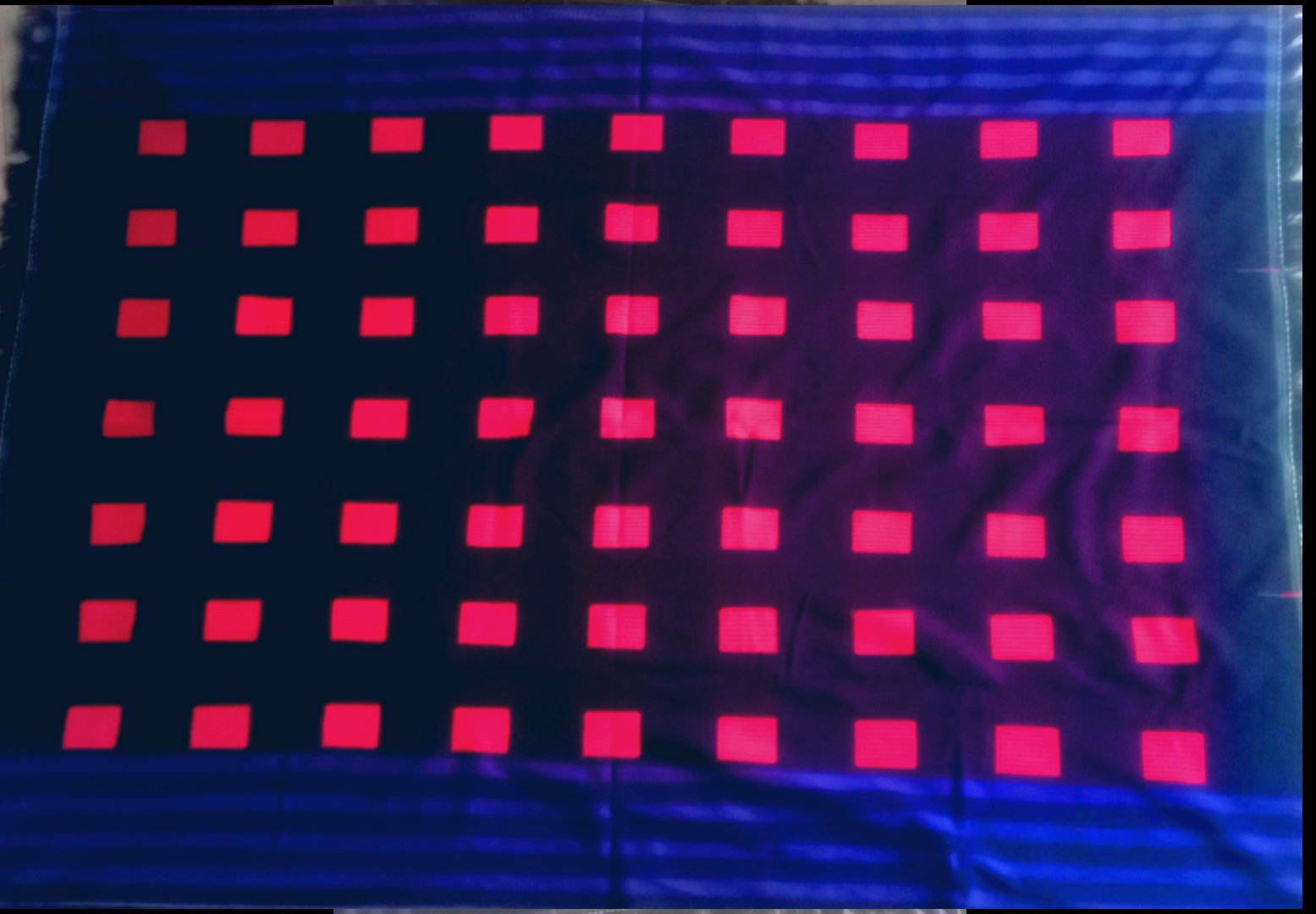
Nütsah.

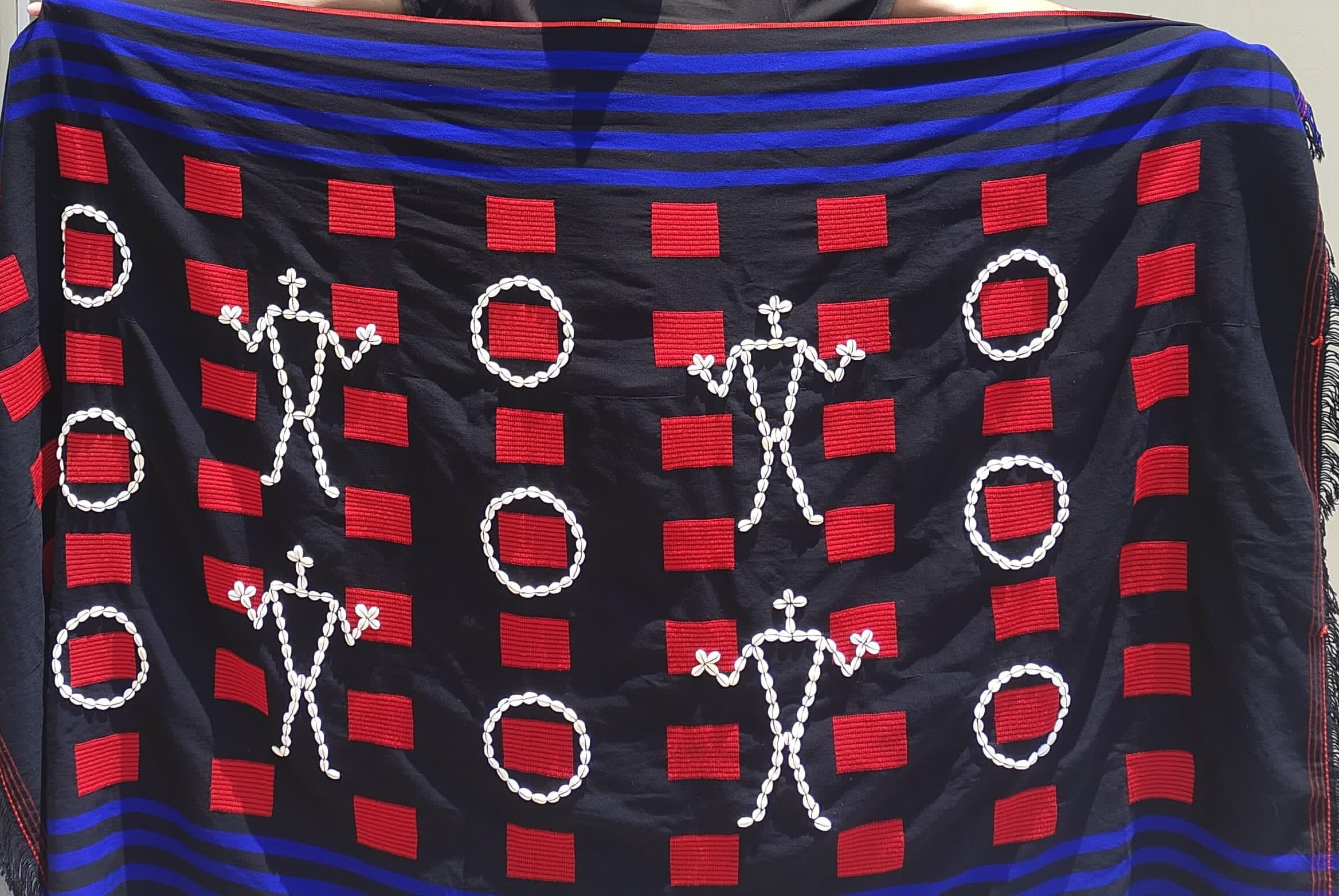
This Shawl which is quite similar to Nütsah is locally called Shiehtsapnie. The only difference is that it has cowrie shells in the form of circular and human figure.

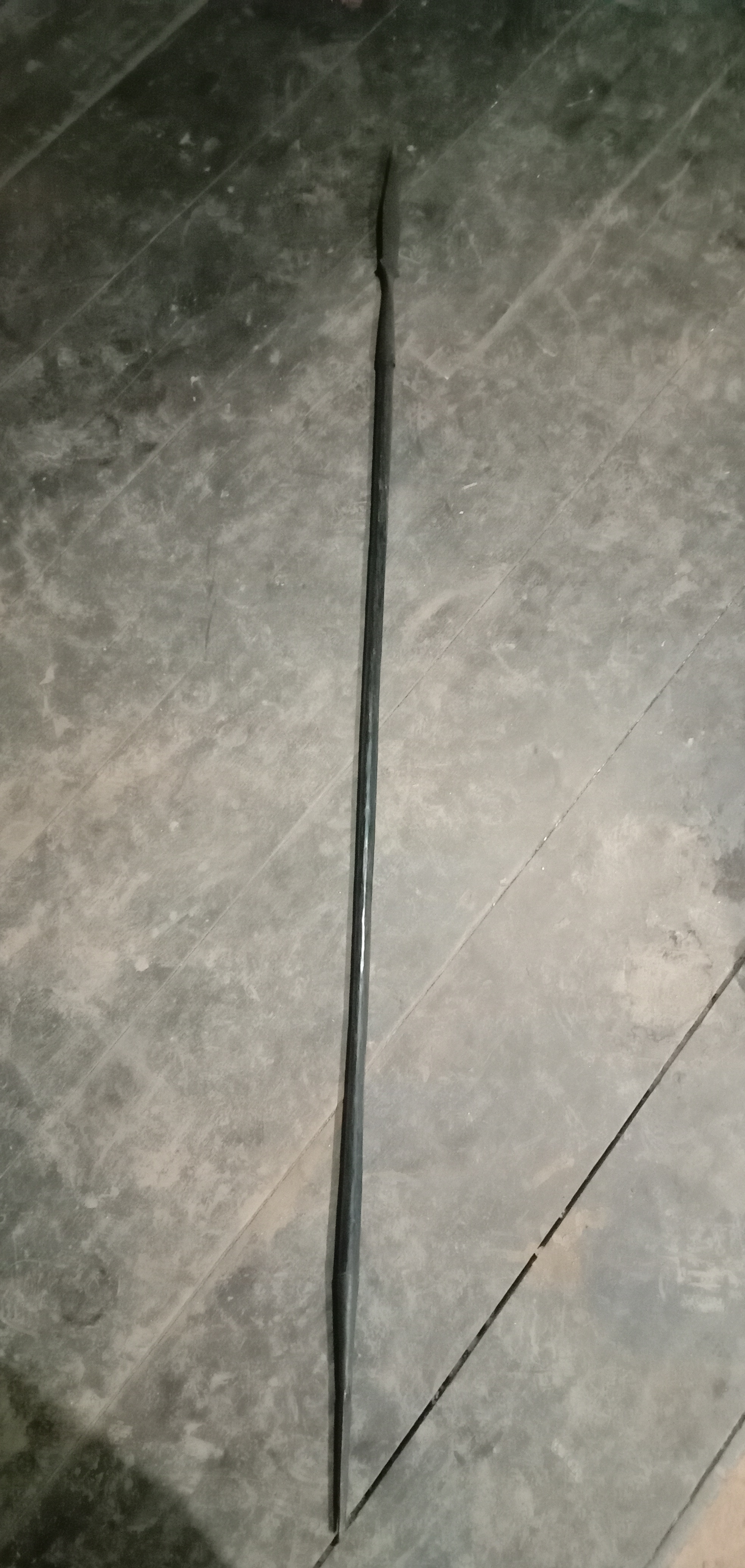
Traditional Khiamniungan spear.

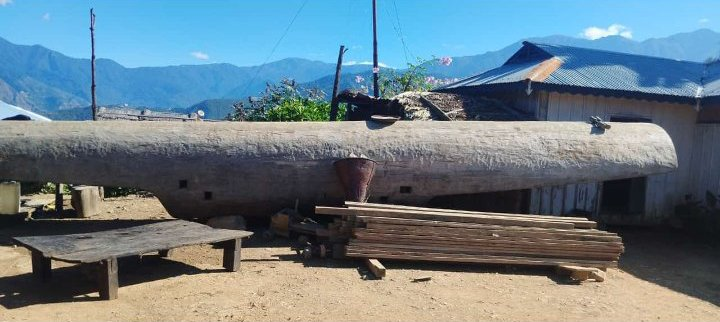
Phie(Logdrum) keeping outside the Pou

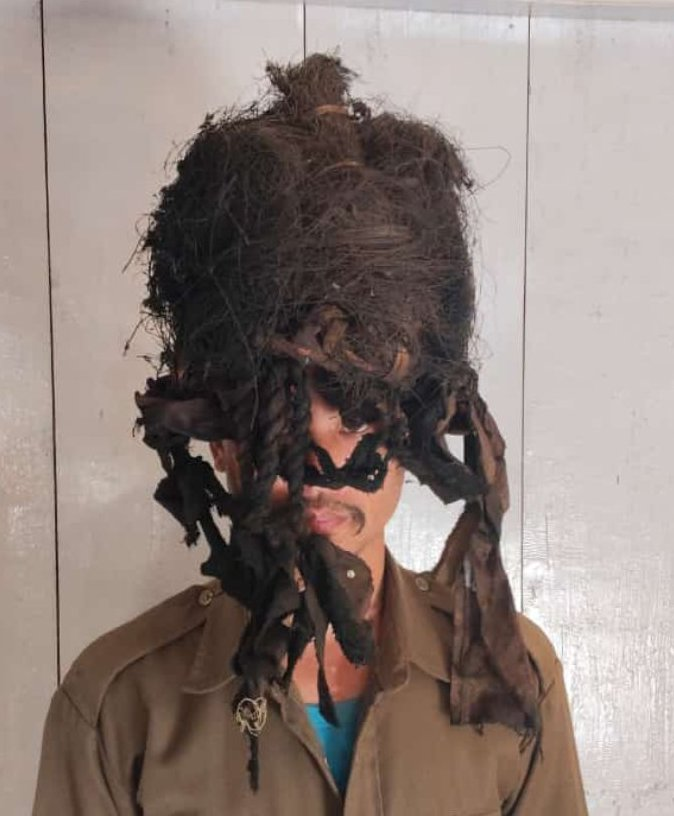
Man with Ahangküha headgear.

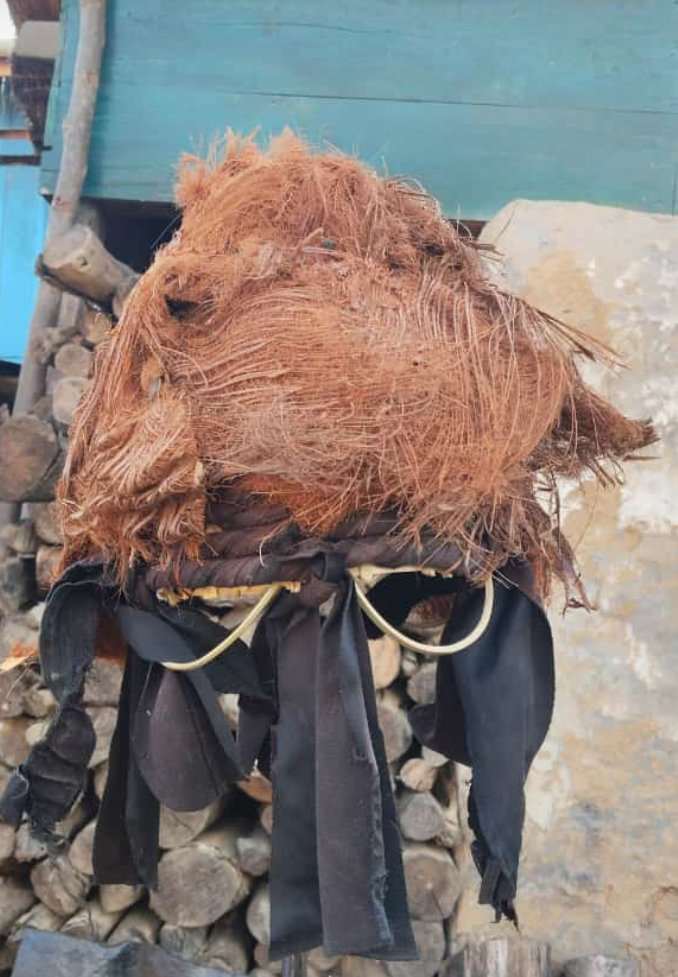
Ahangküha headgear.

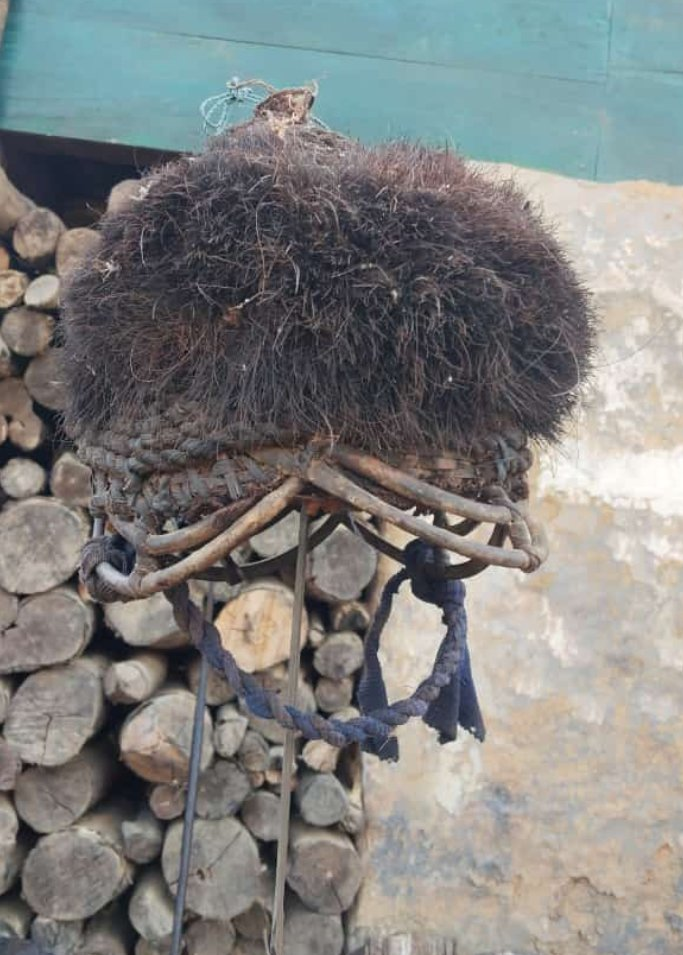
Ahangküha headgear.

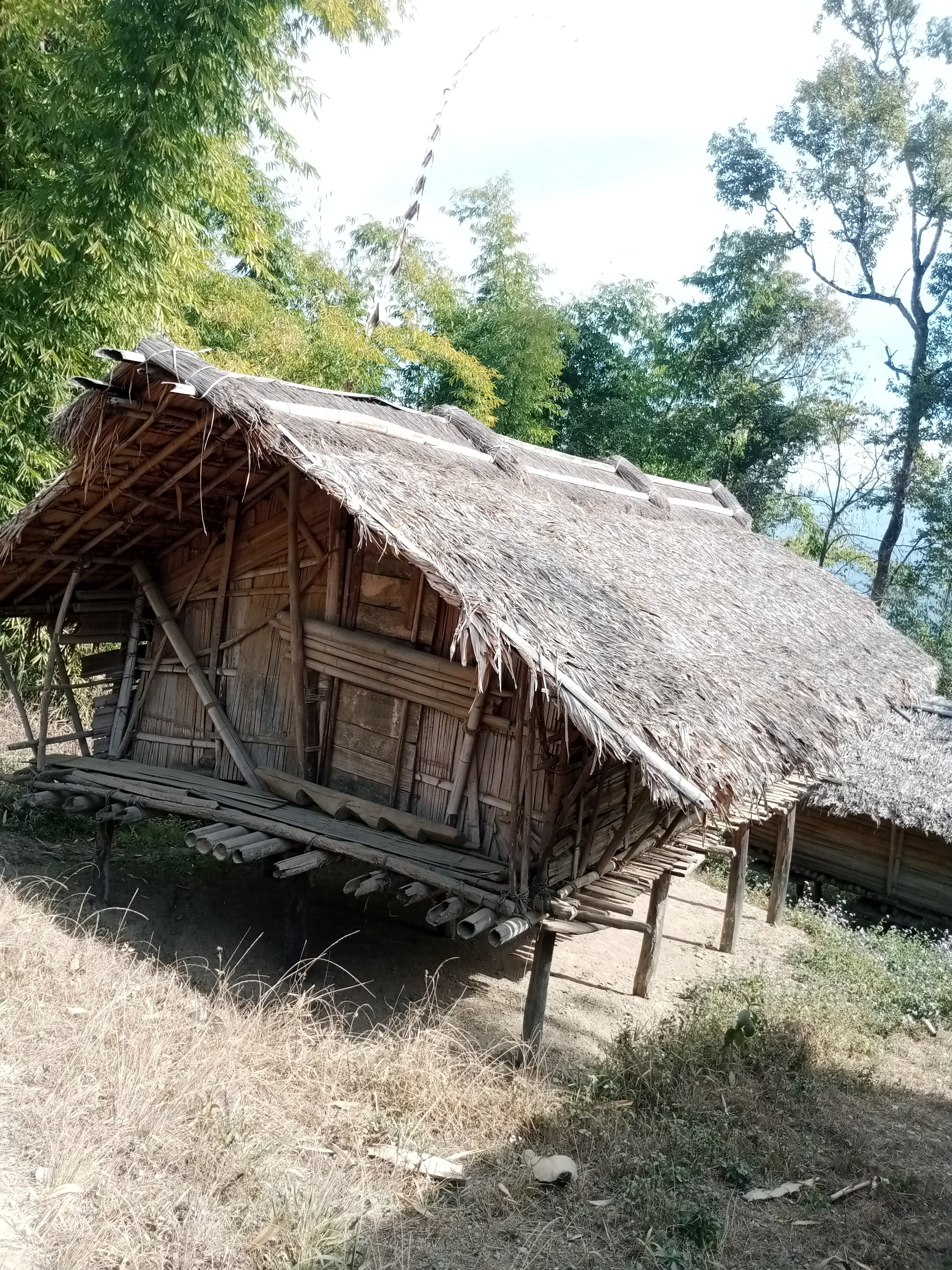
Olden method granary with posts

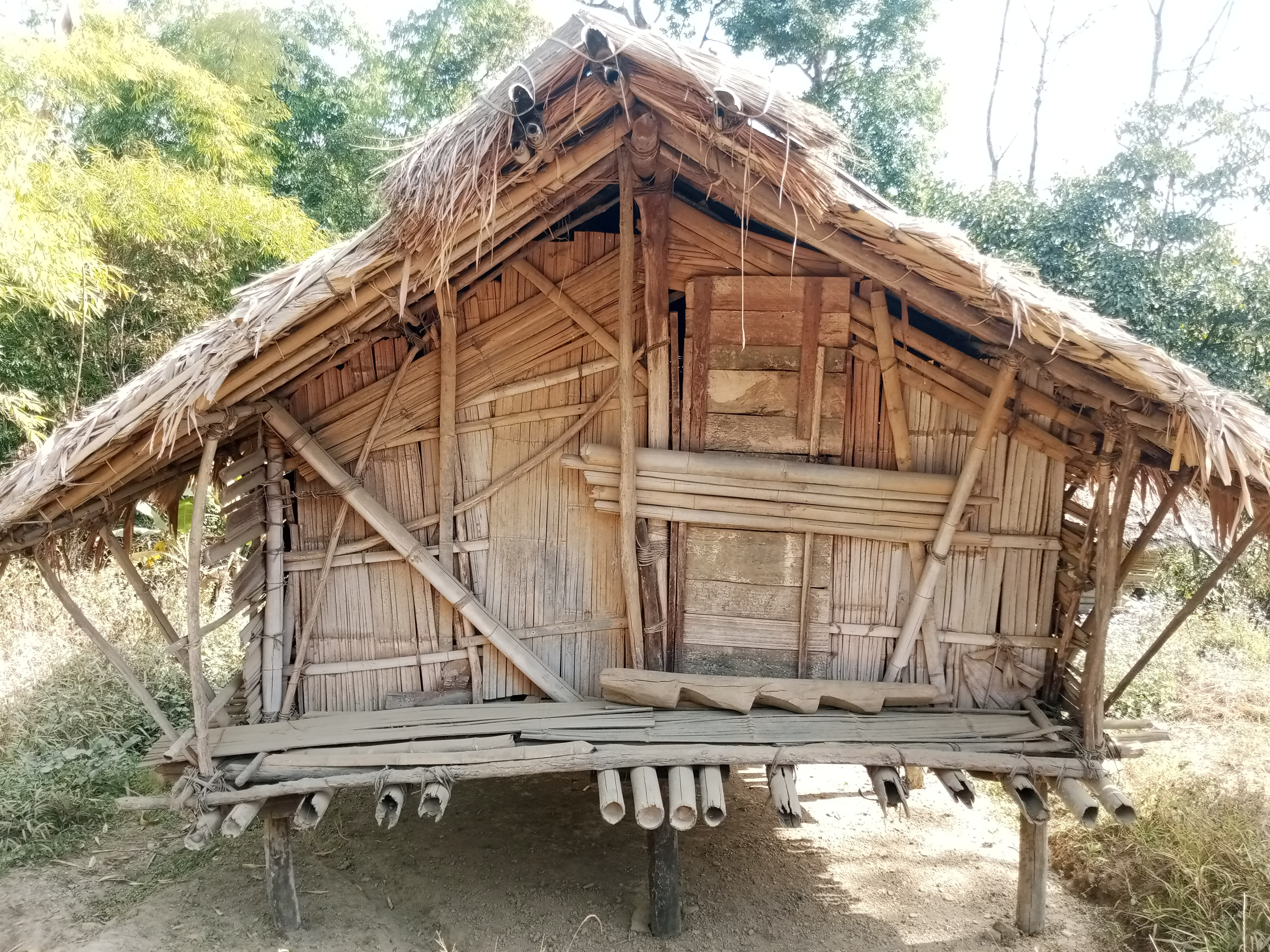
Olden method granary

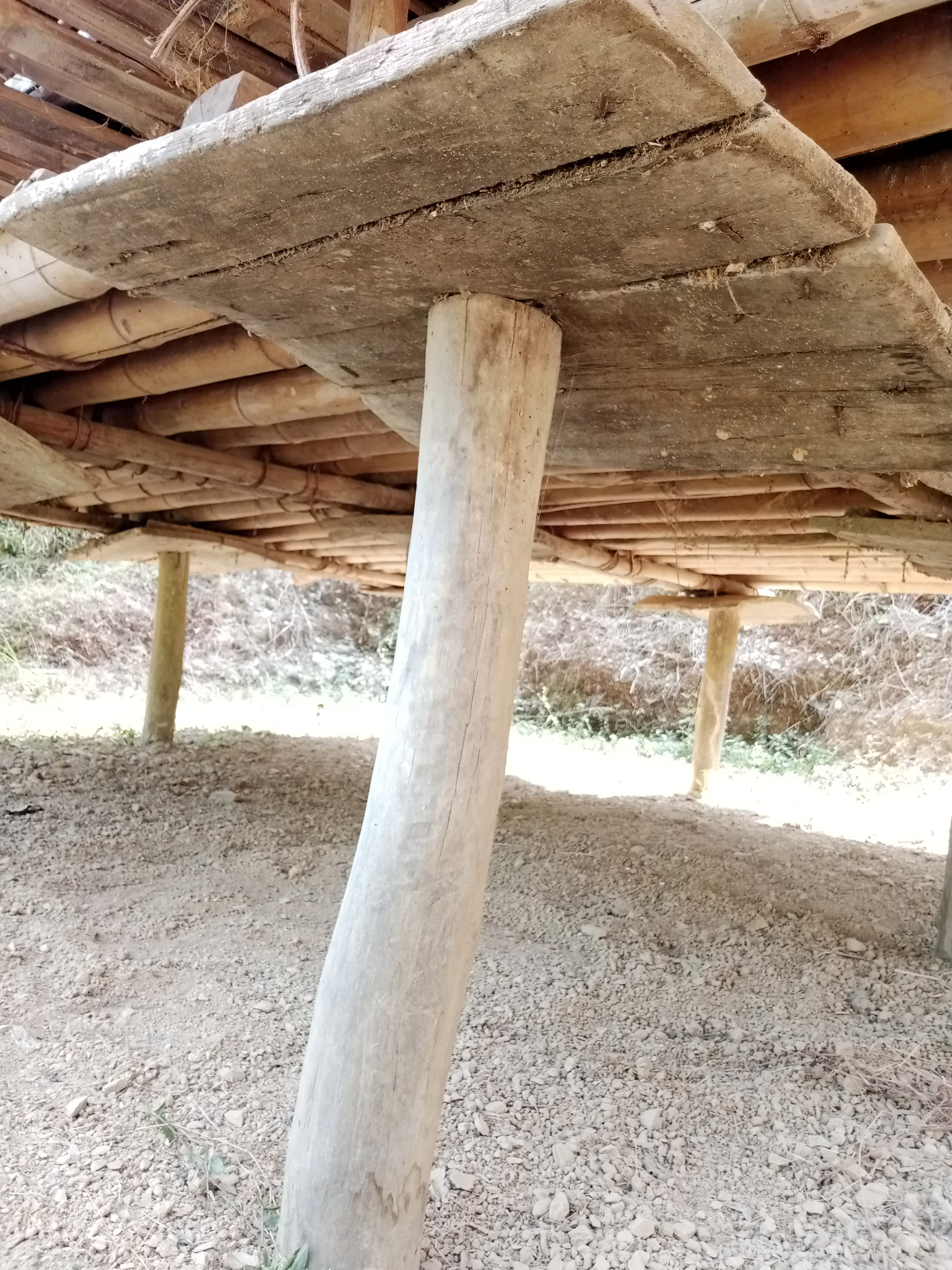
Rat guard design

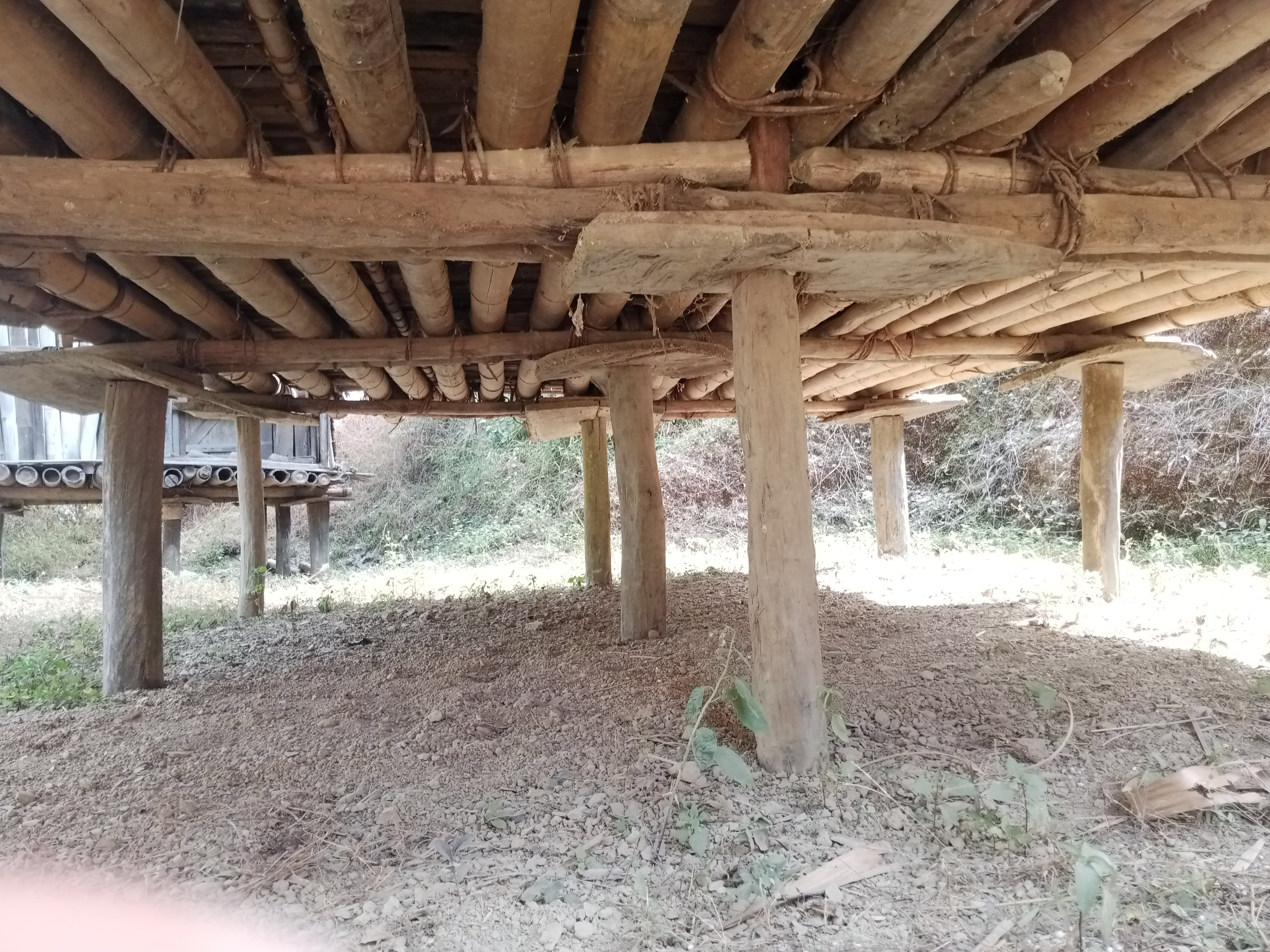
Granary posts designed to prevent rats

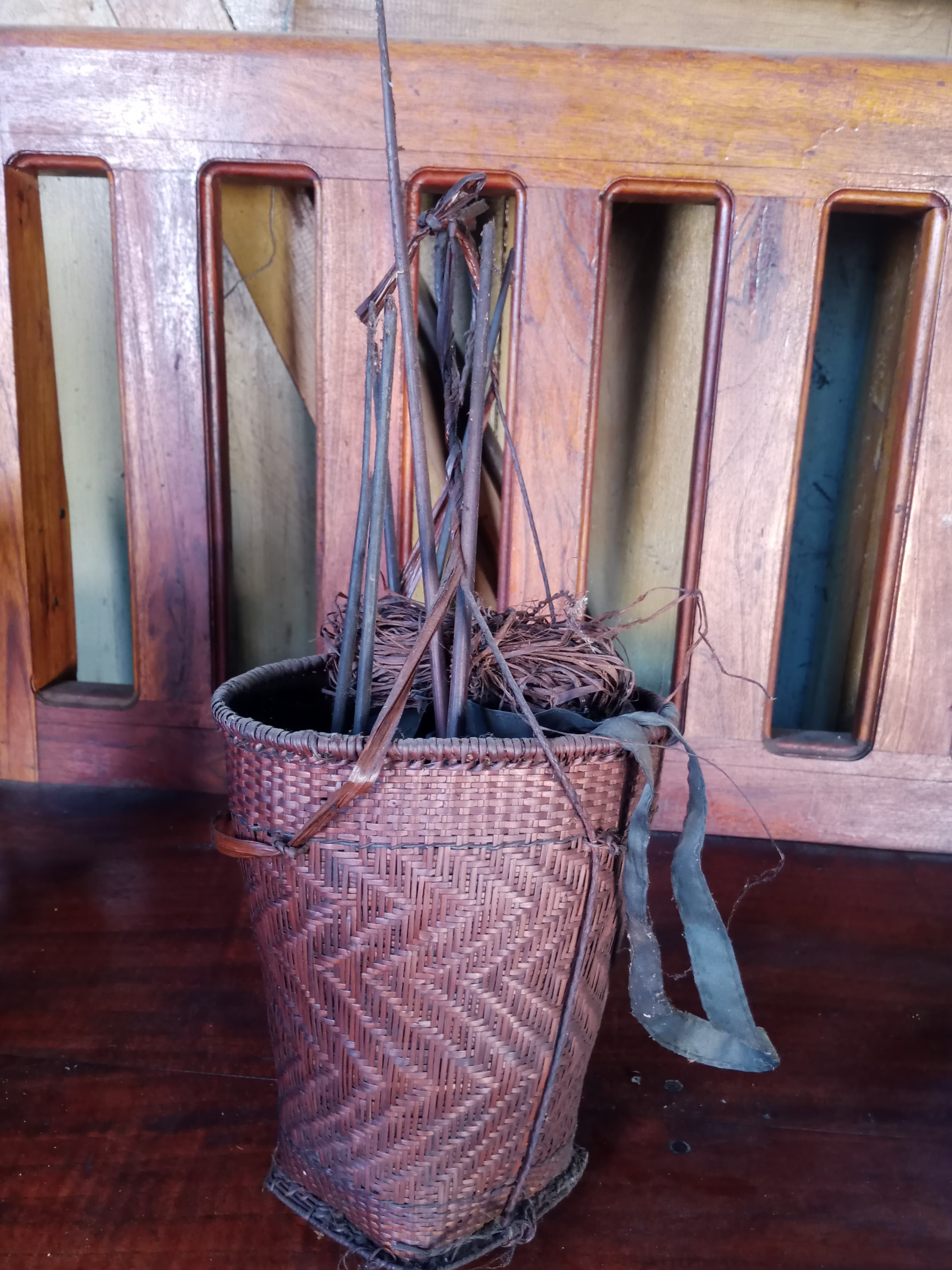
Small basket made of bamboo or cane used for storing ornaments and jewellery

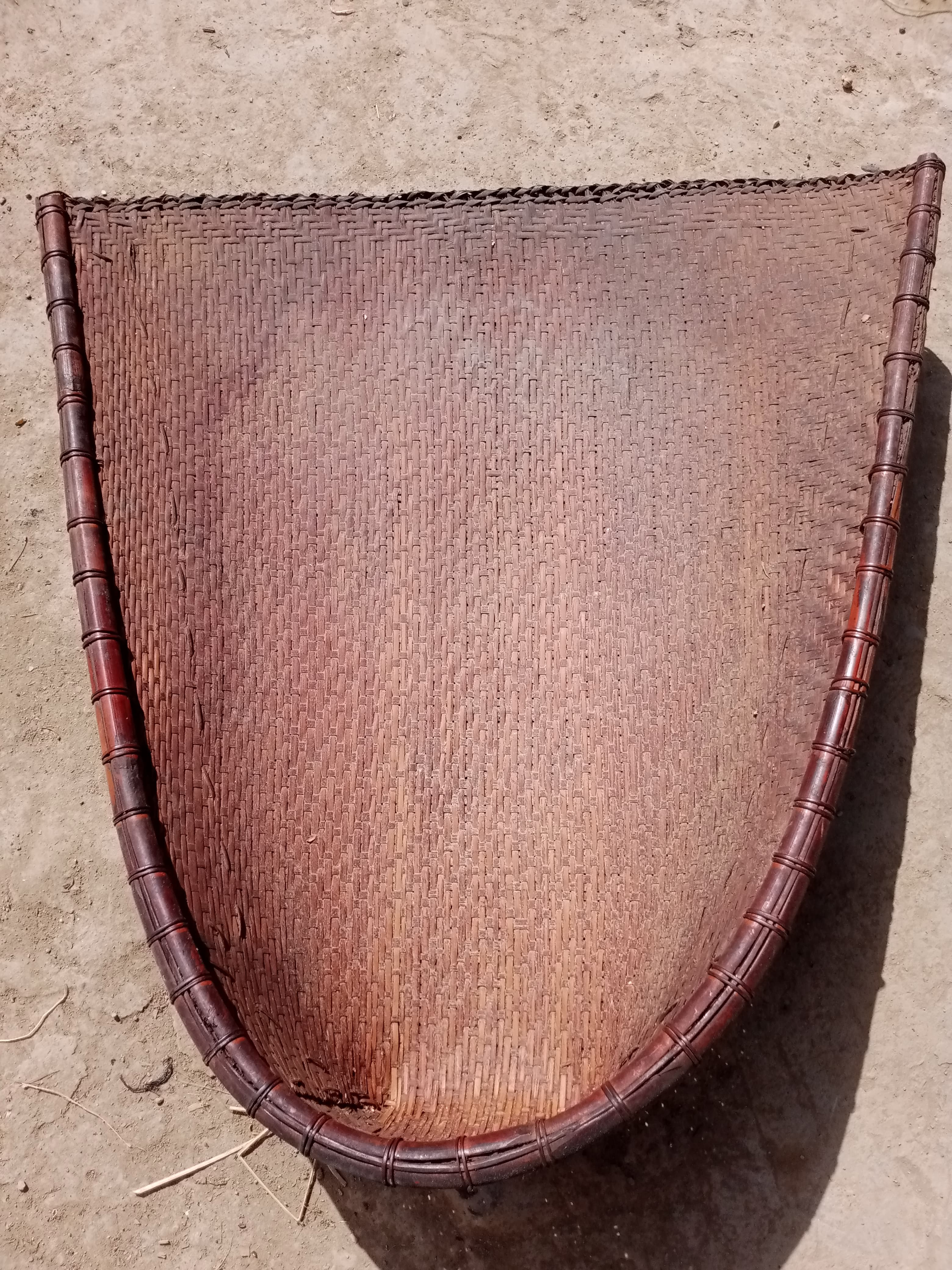
Îe-_Winnowing_tray(Patsho_Khiamniungan)

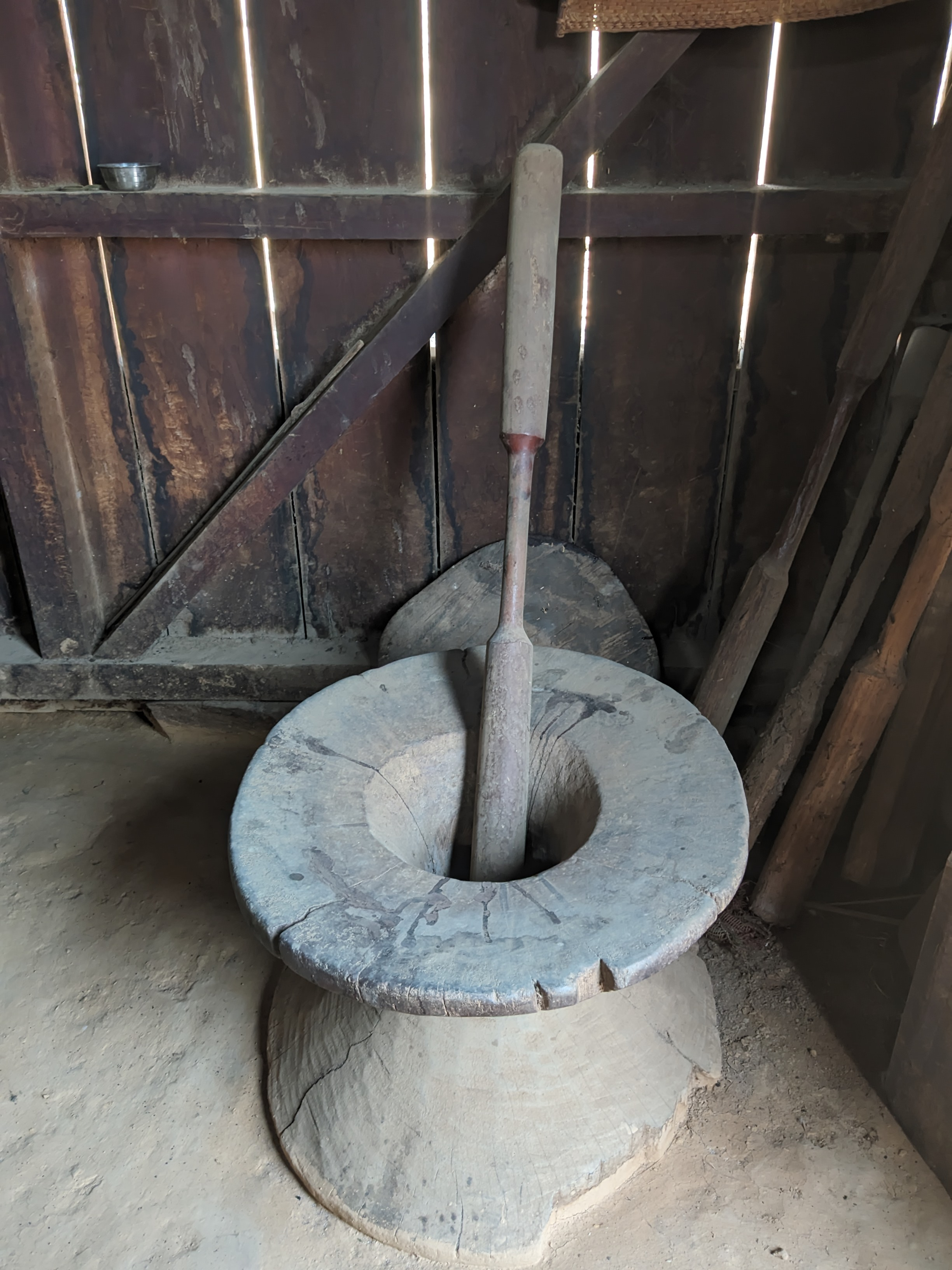
A huge mortar used to grind grains, to separate chaff from grain or to pound so as to grind the grains into smaller pieces

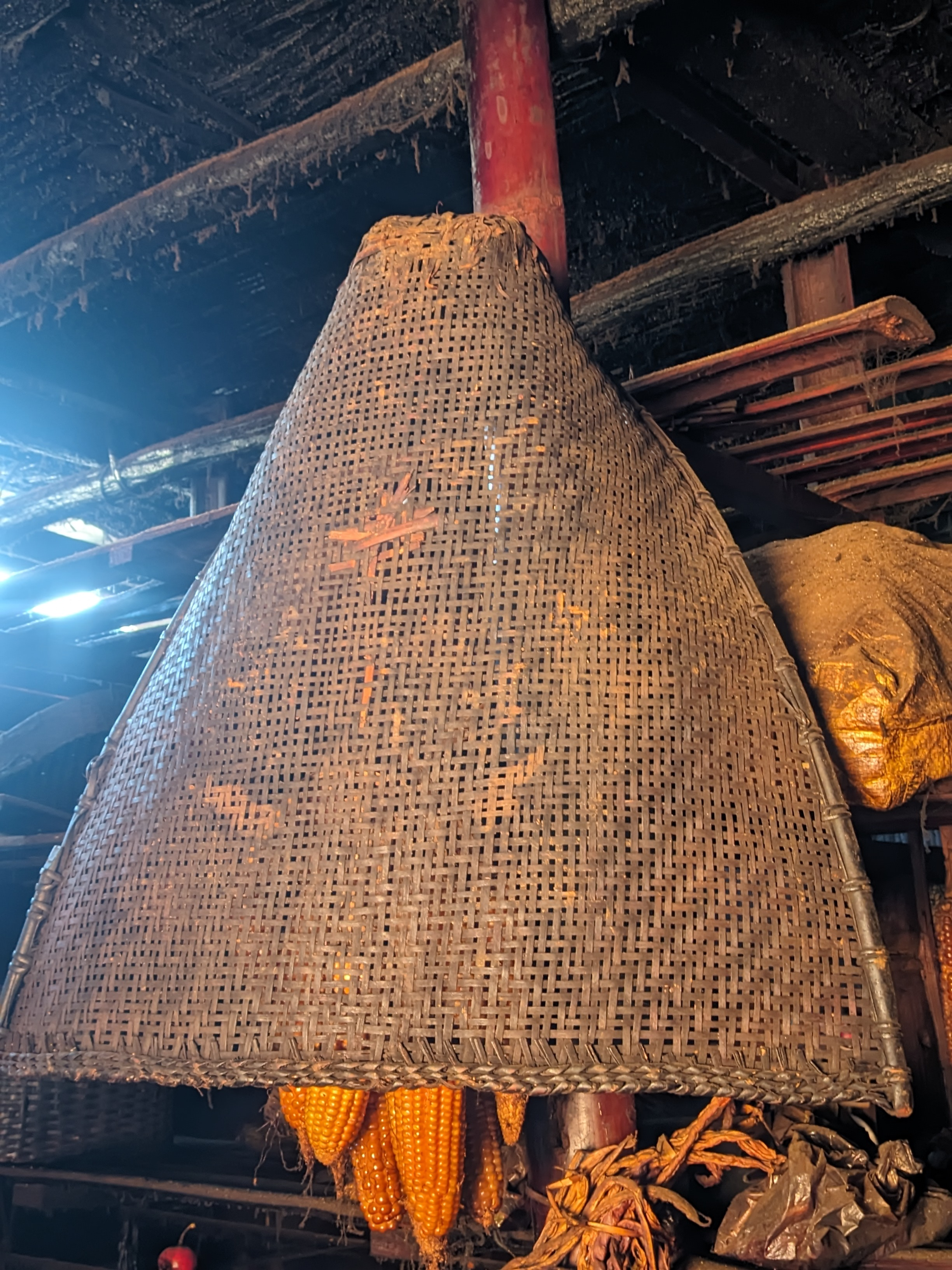
A framed bamboo netting used to grade particles by size, allowing smaller bits to pass through while retaining the larger pieces
