= Patsho Range =

Villages in Nagaland, India

Khiamniungan
Total population
- 7,000 approx

Languages
- Patsho Khiamniungan

Religion
- Christianity

Related ethnic groups
- Patsho people

Patsho Range Patsho Shingtap
- Group of villages
- Location in Nagaland, India
- Coordinates: 26.117565°N 94.931249°E
- Country: India
- State: Nagaland
- District: Noklak
- Administrative circle: Panso

Government
  - Body: Autonomous council
  - Rank: 1st
- Elevation: 1,422.43 m (4,666.8 ft)

Population (2011)
  - Total: 7,000 approx

Languages
  - Official: Patsho Khiamniungan
- Time zone: UTC+5:30 (IST)
- Pincode: 798612
- Vehicle registration: NL

The Patsho range or Patsho shingtap consists of numerous villages in the western part of Noklak district Nagaland, India. It is endowed with distinct culture and abundance of natural resources inherited by the people of Khiamniungan.

== Culture ==
=== Language ===
People of this range speaks pure Patsho Khiamniungan overarchingly introduced the language based on oral tradition to written script.

=== Festivals ===
Tsoukum, Khautsausie and Miu are the important festivals celebrated annually that involves significant culinary items and folk dances.

=== Folk dances ===
The folk dances of these villages are identical and they are performed to fulfill bravery and determination.

== Villages ==
The range is composed of multiple villages dwelling around Patsho village. They are as follows:-

- Patsho
- Patsho Nokking
- Patsho Town
- Iekhau
- Tsangkui
- Lümuoking
- Yokau
- Tshüvau
- Lingnyu
- Kingnyu
