= Patsho (disambiguation) =

Patsho is a village in Noklak District, Nagaland, India. It can also refer to the following other entities:

- Patsho Range, a mountain range
- Patsho Nokking, a village
- Patsho Khiamniungan, a language

== See also ==
- Pashto (disambiguation)
