= Sonorant =

Speech sound produced with continuous non-turbulent airflow

In phonetics and phonology, a sonorant or resonant is a speech sound that is produced with continuous, non-turbulent airflow in the vocal tract; these are the manners of articulation that are most often voiced in the world's languages. Vowels are sonorants, as are semivowels like [j] and [w], nasals like [m] and [n], and liquids (laterals and rhotics) like [l] and [r]. Alternatively, sonorants may be defined as comprising nasals, approximants, and vibrants (thus explicitly excluding lateral fricatives). This set of sounds contrasts with obstruents (stops, affricates and fricatives). As a distinctive feature, sonorants are denoted as [+son].

For some authors, only the term resonant is used with this broader meaning, while sonorant is restricted to the consonantal subset—that is, nasals and liquids only, not vocoids (vowels and semivowels). Some authors have also noted that nasals are both partly sonorant and partly obstruent, as their nasal airflow is sonorous, but their oral airflow is obstructed.

Compare continuants, a class of speech sounds which includes vowels, semivowels, and liquids, as well as fricatives (and in some perspectives, vibrants), but excludes nasals, and contrasts with occlusives.

== Types ==
Whereas obstruents are frequently voiceless, sonorants are almost always voiced. In the sonority hierarchy, all sounds higher than fricatives are sonorants. They can therefore form the nucleus of a syllable in languages that place that distinction at that level of sonority; see Syllable for details.

Sonorants contrast with obstruents, which do stop or cause turbulence in the airflow. The latter group includes fricatives and stops (for example, /s/ and /t/).

Among consonants pronounced in the back of the mouth or in the throat, the distinction between an approximant and a voiced fricative is so blurred that no language is known to contrast them. Thus, uvular, pharyngeal, and glottal fricatives never contrast with approximants.

=== Voiceless ===
Voiceless sonorants are rare; they occur as phonemes in only about 5% of the world's languages. They tend to be extremely quiet and difficult to recognise, even for those people whose language has them.

In every case of a voiceless sonorant occurring, there is a contrasting voiced sonorant. In other words, whenever a language contains a phoneme such as /ʍ/, it also contains a corresponding voiced phoneme such as /w/.

Voiceless sonorants are most common around the Pacific Ocean (in Oceania, East Asia, and North and South America) and in certain language families (such as Austronesian, Sino-Tibetan, Na-Dene and Eskimo–Aleut).

One European language with voiceless sonorants is Welsh. Its phonology contains a phonemic voiceless alveolar trill /r̥/, along with three voiceless nasals: bilabial, alveolar, and velar /m̥ n̥ ŋ̊/.

Another European language with voiceless sonorants is Icelandic, with [l̥ r̥ m̥ n̥ ɲ̊ ŋ̊ ȷ̊] for the corresponding voiced sonorants [l r m n ɲ ŋ j].

Voiceless [r̥ l̥ ʍ] and possibly [m̥ n̥] are hypothesized to have occurred in various dialects of Ancient Greek. The Attic dialect of the Classical period likely had [r̥] as the regular allophone of /r/ at the beginning of words and possibly when it was doubled inside words. Hence, many English words from Ancient Greek roots have rh initially and rrh medially: rhetoric, diarrhea.

Voiceless vowels are allophonic in many languages, particularly when surrounding voiceless consonants, but their phonological status as contrastive phonemes lacks strong evidence; cases where they were previously reported to have contrastive status have failed corroboration in later studies.

=== Glottalic ===
Most sonorants have glottalized variants. In languages that use Latin scripts, they are often written with a modifier apostrophe, either preceding ⟨ʼw⟩, succeeding ⟨wʼ⟩, or above ⟨w̓⟩. Numerous studies have shown that the timing of glottalization for sonorants is fluid, and that they may be realized with:

- preglottalization (glottal onset), such as [ˀw];
- postglottalization (glottal offset), such as [wˀ];
- laryngealization (creaky voice) for the duration of the sounds, such as [w̰];
- or a combination of the aforementioned possibilities.

For simplicity, the remainder of this section will transcribe these sounds with a preceding superscript glottal stop, as in ⟨ˀw⟩, but these transcriptions should not be assumed to be phonetically precise in describing the type of glottalization; they are merely representative.

It has been noted that glottal stops with palatalization and labialization, respectively /ʔʲ/ and /ʔʷ/, are quite similar to the glottalized sonorants /ˀj/ and /ˀw/, and either case may be analyzed instead as sequences, /ʔj/ and /ʔw/; the specific interpretation of these sounds is mostly dependent upon how they pattern with other sounds within a particular language's phonological structure. Some languages (such as Lillooet) may still contrast glottalized sonorants with glottal–sonorant or sonorant–glottal sequences.

Glottalized vowels occur in a variety of languages and are perhaps the most common examples of glottalized sonorants. For consonants, the most common examples cross-linguistically of glottalized sonorants are the aforementioned palatal and labiovelar semivowels /ˀj/ and /ˀw/, the alveolar lateral /ˀl/, and the bilabial and alveolar nasals /ˀm/ and /ˀn/. Among others, they are particularly common in the Salish, Tsimshianic, and Wakashan language families of the Pacific Northwest, as well as several languages of the Atlantic–Congo family of Sub-Saharan Africa and the Kra–Dai family of mainland Southeast Asia and southern China.

Of the rarer glottalized sonorant consonants:

- Jingpo, Khmu, Kuyubí, and Mangbai have a palatal nasal /ˀɲ/
- Chemehuevi, Deg Xinag, Hagei, Jingpo, Lummi, Khmu, Wui, and Yapese have a velar nasal /ˀŋ/
- Lekwungen, Klallam, Saanich and Samish have a post-velar or uvular nasal /ˀɴ/
- Lillooet, Shuswap, and Coast Tsimshian have a non-labial velar approximant /ˀɰ ~ ˀɣ᫛/
- Coeur d'Alene, Lillooet, Okanagan, Shuswap, Spokane, and Thompson have both plain and labialized pharyngeal approximants /ˀʕ̞, ˀʕ̞ʷ/
- Spokane and Yurok have an alveolar approximant /ˀɹ/
- Jingpo has a retroflex approximant /ˀɻ/

== Examples ==
English has the following sonorant consonantal phonemes: /m, n, ŋ, l, r, j, w/.

Old Irish had one of the most complex sonorant systems recorded in linguistics, with 12 coronal sonorants alone. Coronal laterals, nasals, and rhotics had both a fortis–lenis (shown here with an ad hoc upper–lowercase notation) and a broad–slender contrast: /Nˠ, nˠ, Nʲ, nʲ, Rˠ, rˠ, Rʲ, rʲ, Lˠ, lˠ, Lʲ, lʲ/ (see Irish phonology § Fortis and lenis sonorants). There were also /ŋ, ŋʲ, m/ and /mʲ/, making 16 sonorant phonemes in total.

== Sound changes ==
Voiceless sonorants have a strong tendency to either revoice or undergo fortition, for example to form a fricative like /ç/ or /ɬ/.

In connected, continuous speech in North American English, /t/ and /d/ are usually flapped to [ɾ] following sonorants, including vowels, when followed by a vowel or syllabic /l/.

== See also ==
- List of phonetics topics
- Obstruent
- Continuant
- Liquid consonant

== Bibliography ==
- Ladefoged, Peter; Maddieson, Ian (1996). The Sounds of the World's Languages. Oxford: Blackwell. ISBN 0-631-19815-6.
