= Khiamnyunga =

Locality in Nagaland, India

Khiamnyunga Khiamniungan
- Origin, Ancestral place
- Location in Nagaland, India
- Coordinates: 26.194904°N 94.977719°E
- Country: India
- State: Nagaland
- District: Noklak

Languages
  - Official: Patsho Khiamniungan, Khiamniungan language
- Time zone: UTC+5:30 (IST)

The people of Khiamniungans trace their origin to a place called Khiamnyunga. Sometimes spelled "Khiamniunga Nokthang", "Khiamniunga", "Khiamnga", "Khiamngan" etc.

It is located a few kilometres away from Patsho near Tshüvau village and Longsheu king. It is from this place, group of people moved to Lümuoking and the present day Patsho. Later numerous hamlets/villages began to be established across the region.
