= Yakor =

Village in Nagaland, India

- village
- Location in Nagaland, India
- Coordinates: 26.154222°N 94.839488°E
- Country: India
- State: Nagaland
- District: Shamator

Population (2011)
  - Total: 1,078

Languages
  - Official: Yimkhiung
- Time zone: UTC+5:30 (IST)
- Vehicle registration: NL

Yakor village is located in Shamator district in Nagaland, India. It is situated 12 km away from the headquarter Shamator, and 44 km away from Tuensang. The distance between Patsho and Yakor is not very far.

== Population ==
Yakor has a total population of 1,078 peoples, out of which male population is 555 while female population is 523. There are about 187 houses in yakor village.

== Literacy ==
Literacy rate of yakor village is 47.59% out of which 53.87% males and 40.92% females are literate.

== Economy ==
Agriculture is the primary source of the economy. Patsho, Shanties, and Tuensang are the nearest towns for all major economic activities.
