= Wui language =

Sino-Tibetan language spoken in India

Wui
- tʰa³³weɪ⁵² ma³³lan³¹
- Native to: India
- Region: Wui village, Noklak District, Nagaland
- Ethnicity: Wui Naga
- Native speakers: < 1,000 (2023)
- Language family: Sino-Tibetan: Tibeto-Burman; Central Tibeto-Burman (?); Kuki-Chin–Naga; Central Naga (?); Wui

Language codes
- ISO 639-3: –
- Glottolog: wuii1234

Wui (autonym: tʰa³³wɛ⁵² ma³³lan⁵², lit. 'crab language') is a Sino-Tibetan language spoken in Wui village, Noklak District, Nagaland, India (26.036°N 95.067°E). There are just under 1,000 speakers.

== Background ==
Wui is spoken in the single village of Wui, which has about 150 houses. Wui village is situated 10 km west of the India-Myanmar border on the Patsho Range in eastern Nagaland. It is estimated that there are less than 1,000 speakers.

Nearby languages include Tikhir (Aoic) and various Khiamniunganic (Konyakian) varieties. Wui speakers consider themselves to be an ethnic subgroup of the Khiamniungan people and also speak Patsho Khiamniungan. Many Wui people are fluent in Nagamese.

== Classification ==
Due to its divergent lexicon and typological features, the classification of Wui is uncertain. Coupe (2023) suggests a divergent Central Naga affiliation. However, Wui lacks rhotics, which are characteristic of most Central Naga languages.

== Phonology ==
The phonological inventory of Wui is as follows.

Consonants
	labial/ labiodental	dental	palatal/ palato-alveolar	velar	glottal
stop, unasiprated	p	t		k	ʔ
stop, aspirated	pʰ	tʰ		kʰ	
affricate, unaspirated		ts	tʃ		
affricate, aspirated		tsʰ	tʃʰ		
nasal	m	n	ɲ	ŋ	
nasal, glottalized	mˀ	nˀ		ŋˀ	
fricative	(v)	s	ʃ		
approximant	w	l	j		h

Vowels
i	ʉ	u
ɛ		ɔ
	a	

There are three phonemic tones in Wui, which are:

- high level /55/
- mid level /33/
- high falling /52/

== Pronouns ==
Wui personal pronouns are as follows.

	singular	dual	plural
1st person	ŋa⁵²	i³³tsai⁵²	i³³sɪm³³
2nd person	naŋ⁵²	la³³tsaɪ⁵²	la³³sɪm³³
3rd person	ta³³pau⁵²	tʃaʊ³³ɲɪt³³	tʃaʊ³³la³³

== Lexicon ==
Below are some Swadesh list items for Wui as provided in Coupe (2023).

Gloss	Wui
I	ŋa⁵²
you (sg.)	nâŋ
we	i³³tsaɪ⁵²
this	tʃaʊ⁵²
that	kʰɔ⁵²
who?	siʊ⁵²
what?	kaʊ⁵⁵tɔ⁵²
all	tɛ³³la³³pʊm⁵²
many	paŋ⁵²nɛ³³
one	kʰaʔ³³
two	a³³ɲɪt³³
big	ta⁵⁵waʔ³³
long	ʃi⁵⁵nɛ³³
small	a³³laŋ⁵²
woman	tʰa³³ɲu³³lia⁵²
man	ta³³pu³³lia⁵²
person	maiʔ⁵⁵
fish	tha³³ŋɔʔ⁵⁵
bird	u³³lia⁵²
dog	haɪ⁵²
louse	tʃʰɪ⁵⁵paɪ⁵²
tree	sɪn⁵²
seed	tʃaɪʔ³³
leaf	taʊ³³ɔ⁵²
root	ta³³lɪn³³
bark	siŋ³³kʊap³³
skin	tsak³³kʊap³³
flesh	ta³³ma³³tɪn⁵⁵
blood	tʰaɪʔ³³
bone	tă³³lɪt³³
grease	ta³³sɛ⁵²
egg	vɛ⁵⁵la⁵⁵tai³³
horn	ta³³la³³tʃaɪ⁵⁵
tail	ta³³la³³ma⁵⁵
hair	tă³³kɛ³³ɲɪm³³
head	tă³³kɛ⁵²
ear	nʉ³³pʉ³³
eye	ɲit³³tsaŋ³¹
nose	thă³³no³³
mouth	tha³³ɔ⁵²
tooth	pʰɔ⁵²
tongue	ma³³la⁵²
fingernail	mă³³lɪn⁵²
foot	mă³³pʰɔ⁵²
knee	ma³³kʰɔk³³
hand	kʰɛt³³
belly	han⁵²
neck	ʉ⁵²
breasts	la³³ɲʉʔ³³
heart	tă³³ŋi³³la³³sa⁵²
drink	ʉʔ⁵⁵
eat	tsɔ⁵⁵jaʔ⁵²
bite	ma³³kăk⁵²
see	a³³tsaʊ⁵⁵pɛʔ³³
know	ma³³tat³³
sleep	ip³³
die	tă³³saɪ³³wa⁵²
kill	ta³³lɛ³³sat⁵⁵
swim	tɛɪ³³ la³³tʰak⁵⁵
walk	a³³pɪaŋ⁵⁵pɛʔ³¹
come	lɔʔ³³
sit	nuɪʔ⁵⁵
stand	jap³³
give	lɛ⁵⁵paɪʔ³³
say	hɔʔ³³
sun	ja⁵⁵ŋaɪ⁵⁵
moon	ɔ⁵²
star	tʃɪ⁵⁵nɛ⁵⁵
water	taɪ⁵²
rain	tɪn³³taɪ⁵²
stone	loŋ⁵²
earth	la³³la³³
cloud	la³³ma⁵²
smoke	ma³³ma³³kʰaʊʔ⁵⁵
fire	ma⁵²
ash	laʊ⁵⁵ʊt⁵⁵
path	lam⁵²
white	ma³³ŋi⁵²
night	tsi³³ɪn³³
full	lɛ⁵⁵ta⁵⁵tʃɪ̰n³³
name	ɲɪn⁵²
