= New Sanglau Longting =

Village in Nagaland, India

New Sanglau Longting Village
- village
- Location in Nagaland, India
- Coordinates: 26.0344°N 95.0008°E
- Country: India
- State: Nagaland
- District: Noklak

Population (2011)
  - Total: 756

Languages
  - Official: Patsho Khiamniungan
- Time zone: UTC+5:30 (IST)
- Vehicle registration: NL

New Sanglau Longting is a village located 51 km from Noklak district, with a population of 331 across 82 households. It was inaugurated by L Khumo, who was then Advisor of fisheries & aquatic resources, Evaluation, economic and statistics, Government of Nagaland.

The village is situated in the Thounoknyu circle of Tuensang district in Nagaland, India. The most widely spoken language is Patsho Khiamniungan, spoken by the local Patsho community.
