= Sanglau =

Village in Nagaland, India

- village
- Location in Nagaland, India
- Coordinates: 26.067118°N 95.015816°E
- Country: India
- State: Nagaland
- District: Noklak

Population (2011)
  - Total: 3,881

Languages
  - Official: Patsho Khiamniungan
- Time zone: UTC+5:30 (IST)
- Vehicle registration: NL

Sanglau or Sanglao is a village in the Thuonoknyu tehsil in the Noklak district of Nagaland State, India. It is located 44 km south of the Noklak district headquarters and has 561 households. The Sanglao Pin code is 798626 and its postal head office is Noklak.

The language most widely spoken is Patsho Khiamniungan, that of the Patsho people there.
