= Patsho Public Organization =

- Village
- Country: India
- State: Nagaland
- District: Noklak district
- Region: Frontier Nagaland

Government
  - Type: Village council
  - President: Pütuo
  - Head GB (Gaon Bura): S L Shingnyo
  - VDB Secretary: Sheying

Population (2011)
  - Total: 2,117
- Time zone: UTC+5:30 (IST)
- PIN: 798612
- Vehicle registration: NL

The Patsho Public Organisation (PPO) or Pathso Public Organization is a civil society body based in Patsho village, Noklak district, Nagaland, India. It functions as a community‑led pressure group that advocates for public causes, holds local authorities accountable, and mobilises collective action on social and developmental issues.

== Background ==
The PPO serves as the primary civic forum for the Khiamniungan Naga community in Pathso, one of the largest villages in Noklak district. It works alongside the Patsho Students' Union (PSU) and the Patsho Mienyu Hoikam (PMH) to address local concerns. The organisation is registered under relevant state societies acts and operates through an elected executive committee.

== Functions and activities ==
=== Pressure group role ===
The PPO acts as a non‑partisan pressure group that monitors the functioning of local governance, including village councils, district administration, and elected representatives. It has the power to regularly submits memoranda on issues such as road connectivity and healthcare access, education infrastructure. When public grievances are not addressed, the PPO organises peaceful protests, public meetings, and awareness campaigns to draw attention to these issues.

== Support for public causes ==
The organisation actively supports a range of public causes that benefit the wider community. These include:

=== Infrastructure development ===
PPO also wields the authority to Advocate for better roads, electricity, and drinking water supply in remote areas.

=== Transparency in governance ===
PPO can also demand disclosure of public works expenditure and calling for audits when irregularities are suspected.

=== Social welfare ===
Raising awareness about government schemes related to old age pensions, disability benefits, and housing for the poor.

The PPO also facilitates community‑led initiatives such as tree planting drives, village clean‑up programmes, and the construction of common facilities like waiting sheds and footbridges.

=== Anti‑drug abuse campaigns ===
One of the PPO’s prominent public causes is the fight against drug and alcohol abuse. In coordination with local students’ unions and women’s groups, it has organised rallies, workshops, and counselling sessions to discourage substance abuse among youth. These campaigns often involve collaboration with district health officials and the police.
