= Yokau =

Village in Nagaland, India

Khiamniungan
Total population
- 1083 (2011), Nagaland

Languages
- Patsho Khiamniungan

Religion
- Christianity

Related ethnic groups
- Patsho people

Yokau
- village
- Location in Nagaland, India
- Coordinates: 26.160434°N 94.905850°E
- Country: India
- State: Nagaland
- District: Noklak

Population (2011)
  - Total: 1,083

Languages
  - Official: Patsho Khiamniungan
- Time zone: UTC+5:30 (IST)
- Vehicle registration: NL

Yokau village also written as Yokao and Yakhao is located in Panso circle of Noklak district in Nagaland, India. It is situated 13 km away from sub-district headquarter Panso and 56 km away from Tuensang. The language most widely spoken is Patsho Khiamniungan, that of the Patsho people there.

== Origin ==
Following an unremitting period of torrential rain that endured for forty days and nights, the remaining survivors were forced to move toward elevated terrain. Among them was a sow whose back gradually assumed a noticeably downward curve during the ascent to the peak. This unusual curvature of the spine became the basis for the term Yokau, a compound formed from yohnyu (meaning “sow”) and kau (meaning “to bend downward”).

== Population ==
1083 People are living in this Village according to 2011 census, out of these 548 are males and 535 are females. Population of Yokao is 2023 was 1,321 and 1,213 inhabitants in 2022.

== Literacy ==
Literate people are 401 out of 227 are male and 174 are female.

== Agriculture ==
Paddy, Maize and Beans are agriculture commodities grown in this village. Traditional Shawls, Bamboo Baskets and Wood Craft are some of the HandiCraft items produced in this village.
