= Wui village =

Village in Nagaland, India

- village
- Location in Nagaland, India
- Coordinates: 26.053032°N 95.0149609°E
- Country: India
- State: Nagaland
- District: Noklak

Population (2011)
  - Total: 756

Languages
  - Official: Patsho Khiamniungan, Wui language
- Time zone: UTC+5:30 (IST)
- Vehicle registration: NL

Wui village is located in Thuonoknyu circle of Noklak district in Nagaland, India. It is situated 32 km away from sub-district headquarter Thuonoknyu and 128 km away from district parent headquarter Tuensang. The language most widely spoken is Patsho Khiamniungan, of the Patsho people there.

== Economy ==
The village is known for Potteries, blacksmithy and agriculture. The age-old practice of iron ore extraction and metallurgy using primitive tools can be witnessed in this village.

== Population ==
Wui has a total population of 756 peoples, out of which male population is 386 while female population is 370. There are about 170 houses in wui village.

== Literacy ==
Literacy rate of wui village is 32.80% out of which 34.20% males and 31.35% females are literate.
