= Patsho =

Village in Nagaland, India

- Village
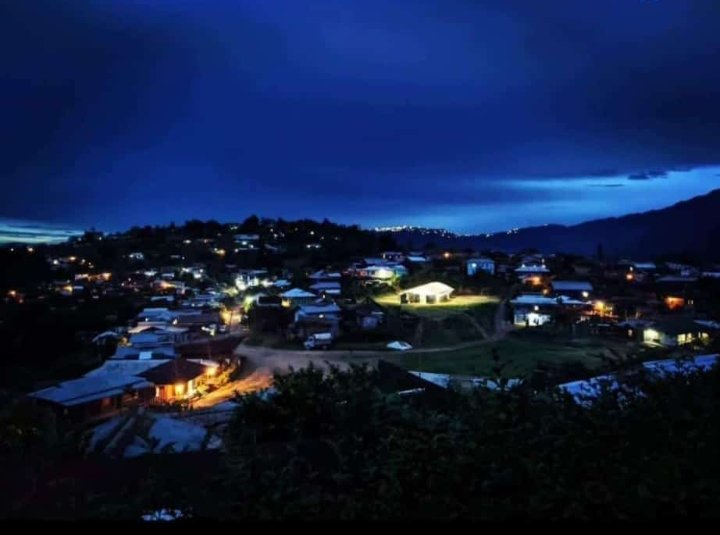
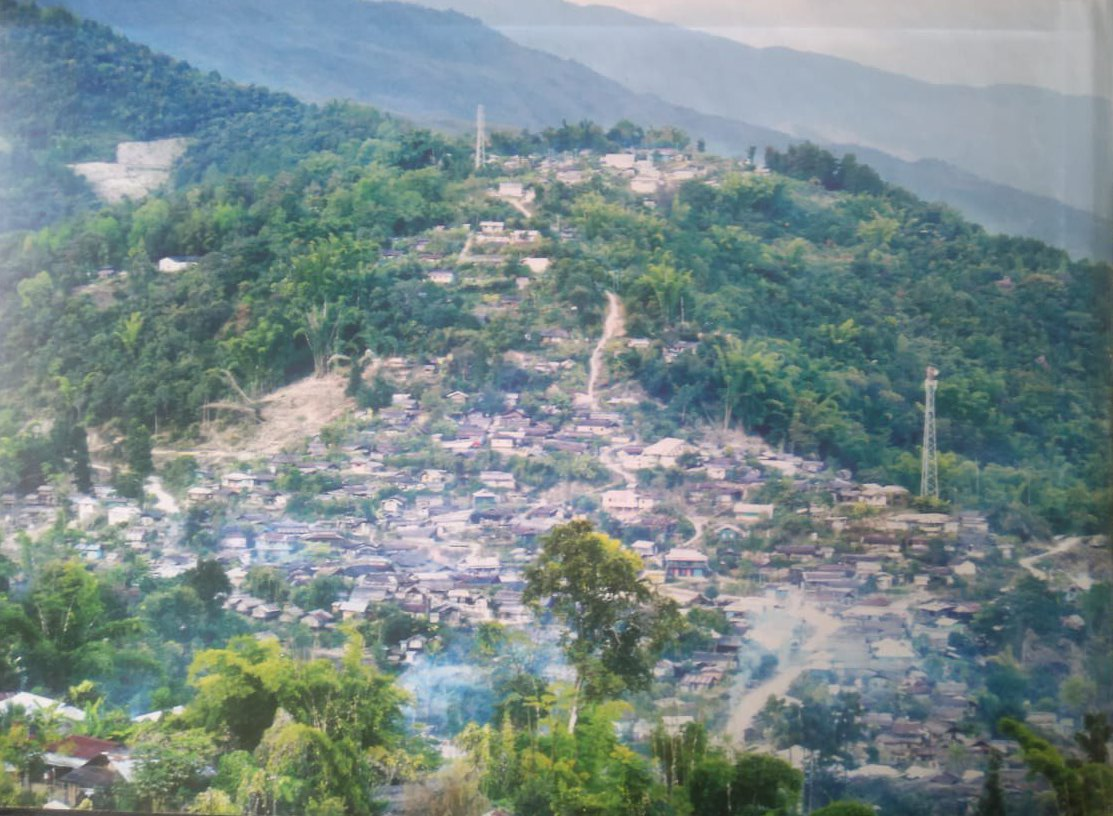
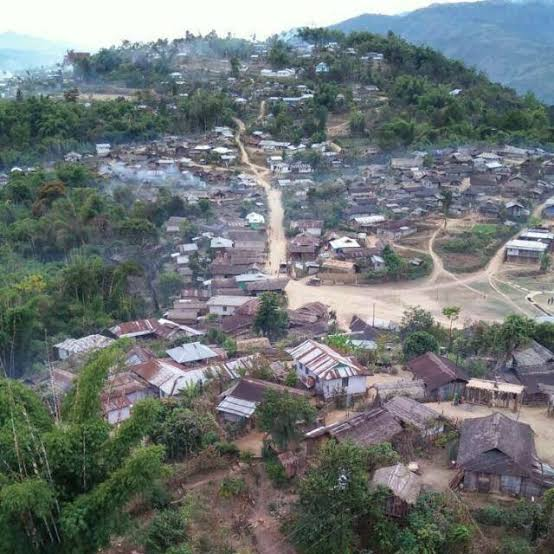
- Patsho at night. View of Patsho Patsho village From top (left to right): Patsho Village at night; Patsho North direction; Shiemong intersection; Patsho Hill
- Motto: "Enfolding and exhibiting excellence"
- Map of the Patsho administrative area, encompassing the village
- Location of Patsho in Nagaland Patsho (India)
- Coordinates: 26°06′45″N 94°55′55″E
- Country: India
- Region: Northeast India
- State: Nagaland
- District: Noklak district
- Block: Panso block

Government
  - Type: Autonomous council
  - Body: Patsho Village Council
  - Head GB: S L Shingnyo
  - Assembly Constituency: 57 Thuonoknyu Assembly Constituency

Area
  - Total: 20 km^{2} (7.7 sq mi)
- Elevation: 1,415 m (4,642 ft)

Population (2011)
  - Total: 2,117
  - Density: 110/km^{2} (270/sq mi)

Languages
  - Official: Patsho Khiamniungan
  - Major languages: Patsho Khiamniungan
  - Official script: Latin script
- Time zone: UTC+5:30 (IST)
- PIN: 798612
- Telephone code: 23200
- Vehicle registration: NL
- Sex ratio(2011): 997 ♀/1000 ♂
- Students' Union: Patsho Students' Union
- Public Organization: Patsho Public Organization
- Cultural Organization: Patsho Cultural Club
- Women Organization: Patsho Mienyu Hoikam
- Church: Patsho Baptist Tuathih
- Climate: Temperate (Köppen)
- Website: www.noklak.nic.in -Village & Panchayats Name of Administrative Circle: Noklak PATHSO

Patsho, also spelled Pathso, is a village in the state of Nagaland within Northeast India. It is situated within the Indo-Burma region of Patkai range, towards the west of Mount Khülio-King. Patsho is one of the largest and most important villages in the district.

== History ==
=== Ancient history ===
The historical account suggest that the Nagas were well-established in their homeland prior to 2nd century AD. The term Nagalogoi is seen in some books which is translated into The realm of the Naked. Apart from this, there are handful source or no written record of the village is found. It is only through folklore and folktales that the picture of how the ancestrals of the village have lived. Verbal history accorded to us are:

==== Communication ====
People communicated only verbally with no written form. The dialect spoken before migration from Khiamnyunga is still obscure, given that there are multiple dialects in Khiamniungan region.

==== Tools ====
Handmade tools like stones or other sharpen wooden tools might have been the primary tools for hunting and gatherings. The renowned traditional tool like dao and spear were also used for headhunting, as a construction tool and other daily activities. In addition Wui village is known for iron smelting. Therefore, it is expected that Patsho might have engaged in trade with Wui through imports or exchanges.

==== Housing ====
Houses were built in close structural homes with only little walkways in between to secure from enemy's raid. The account on slate-house buildings is seen in the book of Christoph von Fürer-Haimendorf but only in the 1930s.

==== Clothing ====
The common cloth for men in those days were loincloth or a langot(Īelêi) and the white shawl purely made from cotton locally called Pàpànìe, with no natural dyes. The rest are animal related products usually made from skin and fur.

=== Middle ages & modern ===
By the time of 12th and 13th century other Naga tribes have already well established trading practice and norms with the introduction of Ahom dynasty led by king Sukapha in Northeast India. But the access to trading route by the villagers might have occurred in a far distant year, given by the clear evidence of difficult terrain and remote region.

According to oral tradition, after the migration from Khiamnyunga the earliest settlement in the village following the prolonged habitation at Lümuoking was Noknyuthang, a small khel (a ward) located between present-day Patsho and Patsho Nokking. This migration might have been accompanied by serious of headhunting exchanges such as sudden raids and attacks on both sides. However, over time, the settlement expanded northward which is towards Iekhau village, and the locality came to be known locally as Patsho, prior to its official designation as Panso (B). The spelling was later altered to Pathso, before the introduction of the Khiamniungan alphabet for Patsho. Today, the currently accepted lexical form is Patsho.

The etymology of the name "Patsho" is obscure, although it may mean "congregation of people." The Patsho people originate from the region of Khiamnyunga, from where a group of people moved towards west to occupy Lümuoking and subsequently inhibited the extant Patsho village.

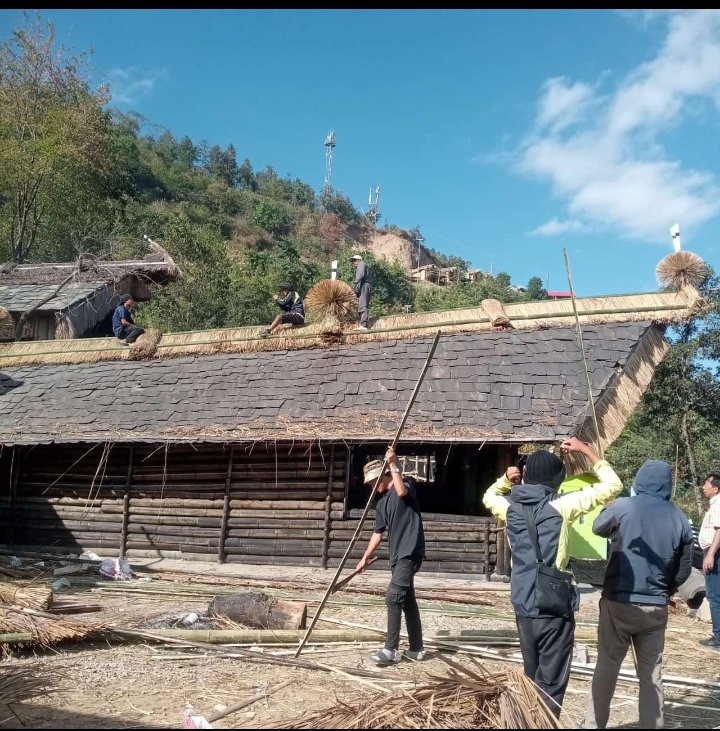
Slate house or Pou/Morung

During the British Raj, the Khiamniungans were referred to as kalyo Kenyu - Slate-House dwellers particularly in the works of anthropologists such as Christoph von Fürer-Haimendorf.

== Geography ==
=== Climate ===
Patsho village undergoes a sub-tropical climate with four distinct seasons: spring (Miuleih), summer (Asheu), autumn (Ochamju/Paichamthok) and winter (A-uh). Patsho comes under the climate zone of Humid subtropical, dry winter(Köppen climate classification). The average mean temperature is around 25.05 °C (77.09 °F). It experience hottest on average in the month of June, when the day time temperature may reach up-to 29.34 °C (84.81 °F), and is coolest in January when the average low temperature may fall below 11.33 °C (52.39 °F). Rainfall in the area varies from 150 to 250 cm. The bulk of rainfall is received between May and October.

=== Topography ===
The village is a part of the larger Indo-Burma mountain system lying to the west of Mount Khülio-King. This topographical setting contributes to its distinct climatic conditions, which are categorized as a humid subtropical climate with a dry winter and hot summer.

Patsho neighbors Kingnyu to the east, Tshüvau and Lingnyu to the northeast, Yokau and Iekhau to the north, Patsho Nokking and Patsho Town to the south, Kingphu and New Sanglau Longding to the south west, Yakor to the north west and Shamator to the west.

=== Landscape and relief ===
The terrain of Pathso presents a varied landscape, characterized by a distinct division. Approximately half of the area consists of gentle hill, while the other half comprises relatively flat, low-lying plain. The elevated section is inhibited by the neighboring village of Iekhau and to the south, the adjoining village is known as Patsho Nokking which is comparatively a inch higher then Pathso. Relatively, the village itself is situated at a much lower elevation than Sanglau village and the prominent Mount Khülio-King, including the nearby town of Shamator, which occupy higher ground in the surrounding region.

== People ==
The people of Patsho are members of the broader Mongoloid Naga community with varied stature and yellow to brown complexions. The village is a clan-based society that values lineage and forefathers. Historical accounts note a notable hospitality extended toward certain foreigners in earlier periods, which subtly reflects aspects of the community's character. This people were once regarded as among the most formidable in warfare, with opponents from neighboring villages hesitating to attack or raid the village. The villager were adapted in the use of poisoned arrows and mastered tactical engagements, where a single warrior or a pair could fiercely and effectively overcome larger groups of adversaries. Unlike that past era, the community is now characterized by a consistently polite and gracious conduct, actively demonstrating compassion by supporting the indigent or aiding the destitute. This profound culture has been significantly influenced by the advent of Christianity and the introduction of modern education, which indeed appears to be a positive impact on the village society.

== Organizations ==
=== Community organizations ===
The village is run by community organizations to monitor the village development in all aspects of social life and their primary objective is to address the various needs of the village.

==== Patsho Baptist Tuathih (church) ====
The Patsho (Pathso) Baptist Church (Pathso Bapitst Tuathih) serves as a central spiritual and often acts as a village community hub for moral guidance.

==== Patsho Village Council ====
The Patsho Village Council is composed of village elders who are the custodian of traditional laws, customs, and village governance. The council resolves local disputes, manages village resources, and acts as the official liaison between the village and the higher authorities of state government especially Noklak district administration.

==== Patsho Mienyu (Women's) Organization ====
The Patsho Mienyu Hoikam is the apex body for women in the village and the primary focus is women issues like women empowerment, welfare, and socio-economic development. The incumbent President is Mrs. Sujang.

==== Patsho Students' Union ====
The Patsho Students' Union, established in 1970 is an apex students' body representing the interests of the village's student population and its primary role is to improve village education and provide community awareness. The Union also opposes drug abuse and alcoholism, encourage healthy lifestyle especially amongst the youth in the village.

Pathso Lam / Neye Students' Union (1966) and Pathso Lam / Nyu Students' Union (1970)
Position	1966 – Pathso Lam / Neye Students' Union	1970 – Pathso Lam / Nyu Students' Union
President	Mr. S Khomo	Mr. P. Langkhio
Vice President	Late. Langshi	L. Pukhio
Secretary	Pukie	Pukie
Asst. Secretary	Potto	K. Shingnyu

==== Patsho Public Organization ====
The Patsho Public Organization sometime functions as a pressure group that addresses developmental and infrastructure needs of the village.

==== Pathso Cultural Club ====
The Pathso Cultural Club is engaged in the preservation and promotion of the indigenous heritage like documentation and performance of traditional songs, dances, and folk narratives that have been orally passed down through generations. They are the representative of village to any social occasion invited by different organizations and authorities for showcasing folksong and folkdances.

== Education ==
In the past, educational attainment remained out of reach for most villagers, hindered by a social framework that undervalued formal learning and by the urgency of subsistence challenges. This paradigm shifted fundamentally with the advent of new academic institutions in the village.

=== List of academic institutions ===
List of private schools

- Union Mission School - Established in 2017. – Class A-2 Today, the school operates form class A to class 8.

List of government schools

- Government Primary School Pathso – Class A-4, Established in the year 1963.
- Government High School – Class 5-10, Established in 1970.

=== Literacy rate ===
According to the 2011 Indian census, the literacy rate of this village is 54.87%. In Pathso Male literacy stands at 58.07% while female literacy rate was 51.60%.

== Politics ==
=== History ===
The Kalyo Kengyu villages, including Patsho, did not feature a system of hereditary chieftainship. Instead, the social organization operated on democratic principles, with leadership typically accorded to elders from each khel and especially to men who distinguished themselves through combat proficiency, economic success or people who had gained importance in these feat. In the specific case of Patsho, however, a single hereditary role existed: a male figure within a designated clan who held exclusive responsibility for conducting magical and religious ceremonies.

=== Present administration ===
Patsho forms part of Thonoknyu Assembly constituency #57 in the Nagaland Legislative Assembly.

Field	Details
Constituency	Thonoknyu (57)
Incumbent MLA	Benei M. Lamthiu
Political Party	National People's Party (NPP)
Elected Year	2023
Preceded by	L. Khumo Khiamniungan (2013–2018, 2018-2023)
First MLA elected	P. Mongchua Khiamniungan 1974

=== Local administration ===
"As per constitution of India and Panchyati Raj Act, the village is governed through its local village administration, headed by elected community representatives who oversee village affairs and development activities.

GBs appointed during the pre-independence period
Sl. No.	Name of GB
1	Late Chemong
2	Langshi
3	Tangmong
4	Tuming
5	Khuyang
6	Sheying
7	Longkhoi

GBs appointed after independence period.
Position	Name	Tenure / Status
Chairman	S Chillio	12 January 1979 to 19 July 1984
Chairman	Büming	
Chairman	Chietei	
Chairman	Püshong	Incumbent
Position	Name	Tenure / Status
VDB Secretary	Jakpuo	1981 to 12 August 1984
VDB Secretary	K Shingnyo	1984–1998
VDB Secretary	Mükom	
VDB Secretary	Tangsoi	
VDB Secretary	Sheying	Incumbent
Position	Name	Tenure / Status
Head Gaon Bura	Pingchang	1st Head GB of undivided Patsho
Head Gaon Bura	Sheying	
Head Gaon Bura	Chietei	
Head Gaon Bura	S L Shingnyo	2026(Incumbent)
Position	Name	Tenure / Status
Village Council Secretary	P. Pütshi	2 June 1979 to 16 October 1979.

== Economy ==
Agriculture and animal husbandry form the economic foundation of the village. Agriculture in Patsho is primarily based on jhum cultivation. The principal crops grown include maize, rice, yam, millet, Job's tears (adlay millet), beans, sweet potatoes, pulses and spices. Cotton production remains a significant supplementary activity, contributing to household income. Some of the key cultivated crops in the village include Paddy, Maize Millet, Beans of different kind, Chilies, Taro, Sweet potatoes. This diversified agricultural base contributes significantly to the local economy of the district.

=== Data on agriculture ===
Workers	Total	Male	Female
Main workers	1015	521	491
Cultivators	930	458	472
Agricultural labourers	10	6	4
Other workers	75	60	15
Marginal workers	142	66	76
Non working	960	470	490

Additionally, the village's income is mainly added from villagers who are employed in government sectors, as well as from the sale of harvested products such as fruits, corn, cardamom, ginger, and ginseng etc. in addition to crafts, handicrafts, and blacksmithing.

== Culture ==
Patsho is considered an important cultural centre of the community and a repository of its heritage and customs. It serves as a major source of folk traditions and preserves a rich collection of traditional artifacts and clothing inherited from earlier generations.

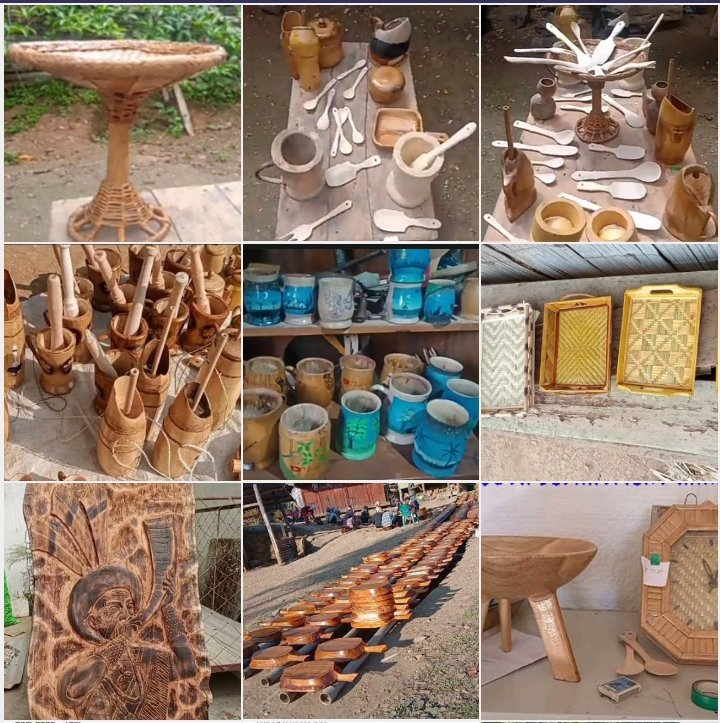
Different types of wooden and bamboo products all made in Patsho village

=== Marriages ===
The social structure is organized around two exogamous clans, known as Shiu and Lam, between which intermarriage traditionally occurs. The community strictly adheres to monogamous marriages and notably does not practice the custom of bride-price like some other Naga tribes do.

=== Seisei-ie ===
Furthermore, the ancestral inheritance of wordplay and puns exhibits a unique cultural tradition among the Khiamniungan people, particularly within the community of Patsho, dating to the village's foundation. Historically, this practice took the form of competitive exchanges between villages in order to patronize and devalue the opponent's village dignity, contrasting with the contemporary style of function primarily as a mode of entertainment.

=== Nütsah ===
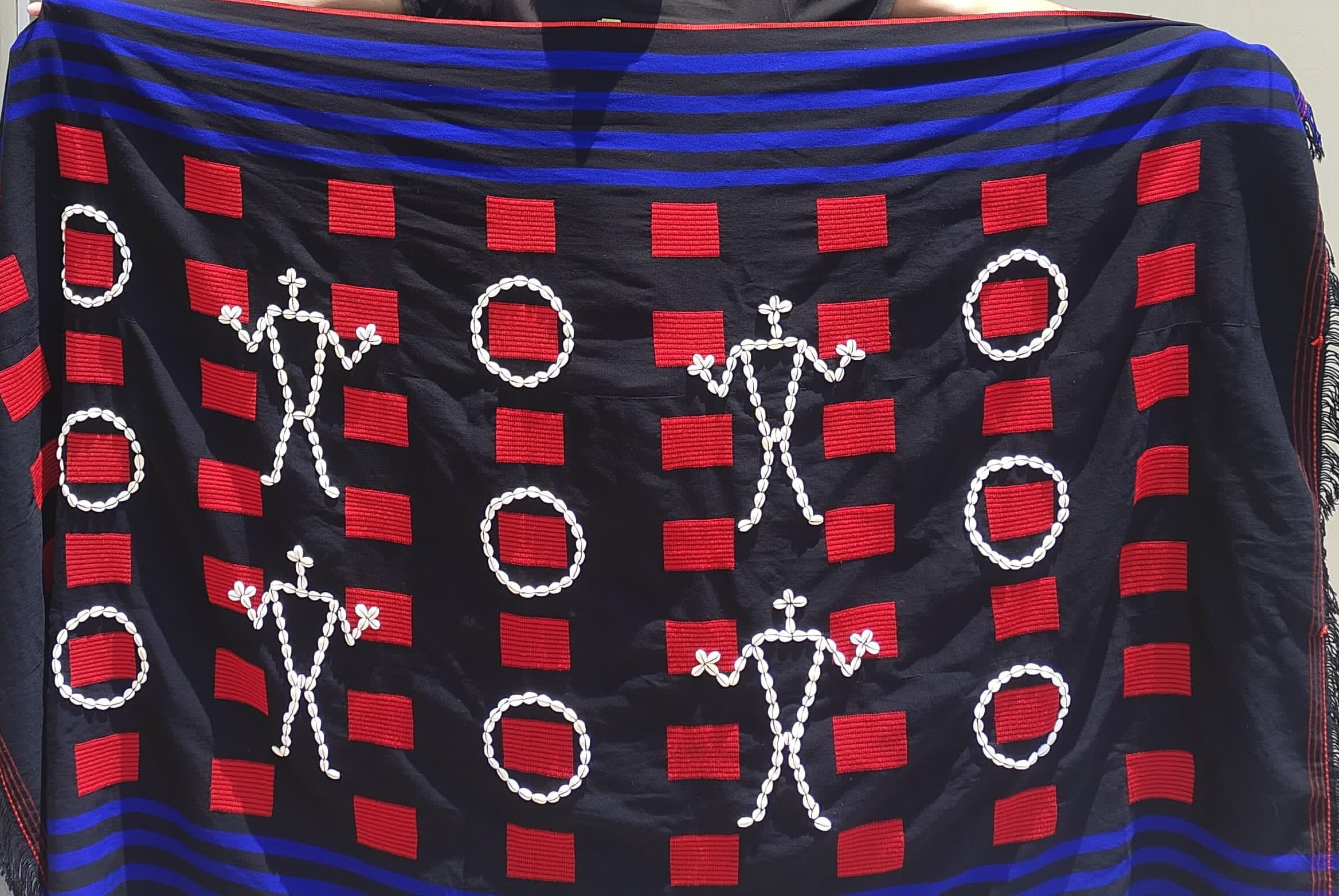
This Shawl which is quite similar to Nütsah is locally called Shiehtsapnie. The only difference is that it has cowrie shells in the form of circular and human figure.

The Nütsah is a traditional shawl handwoven by the Khiamniungan people of Nagaland in northeastern India, historically reserved for warriors who had taken enemy heads and wealthy men of high social rank. Woven exclusively by skilled women, this prestigious garment features a black background with intricate red square motifs (often in a 9x7 grid) and orange borders, symbolizing a "fierce bloody war champion," while blue lines represent a "peaceful dominant disposition of all mankind". When cowrie shells, which represent feasts of merit, are added, the shawl is known as Shiehtsap nie. In modern times, the Nütsah has evolved into a broader cultural symbol of ancestral pride and is worn by men to honor their heritage.

=== Traditional dances ===
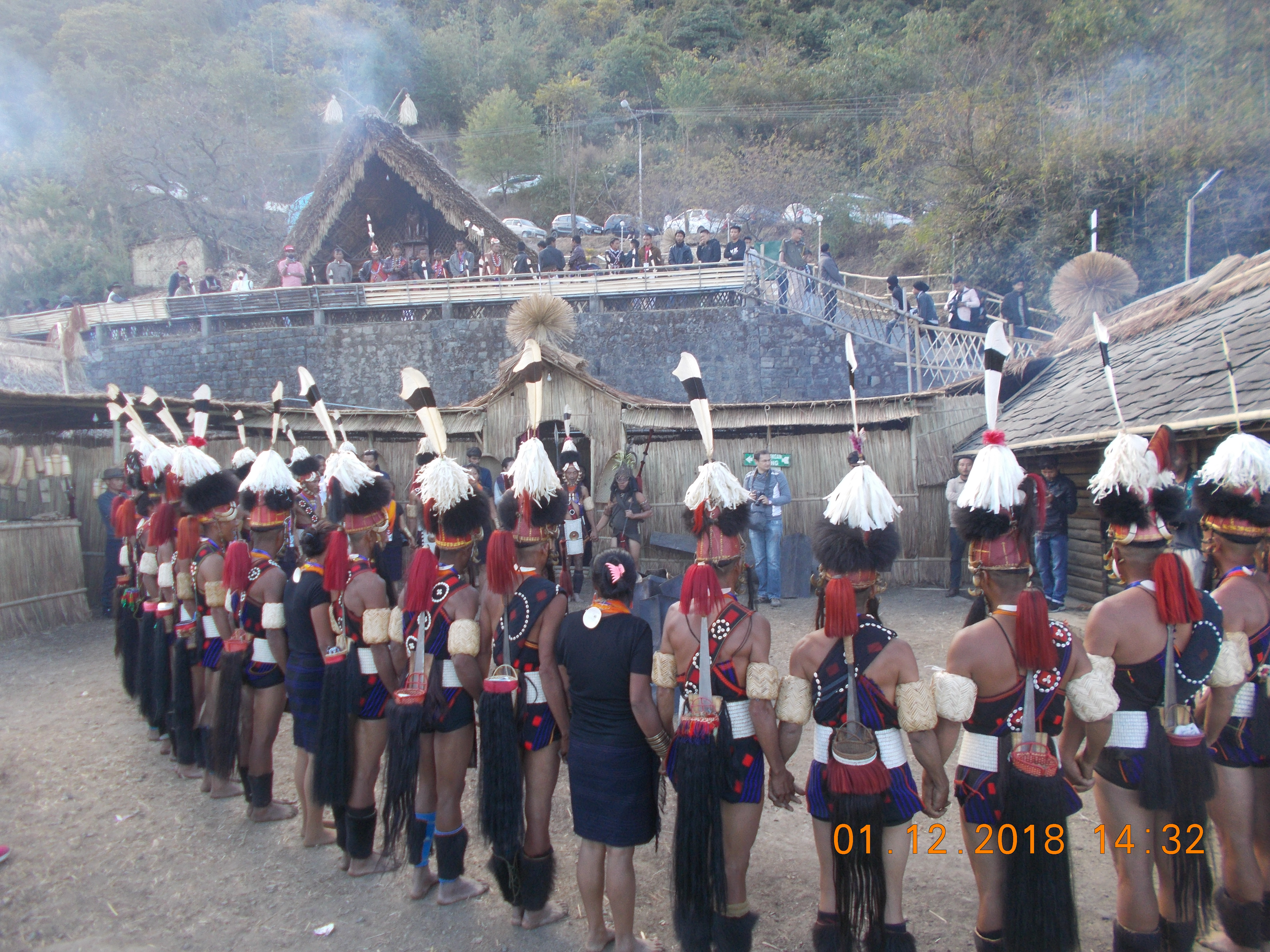
Folkdance

Some cultural dance performed by the villagers.

- Lāngnyū Khìamjàngjē: Performs during Miu & Tsoukum Festivals
- Jāmhàng: Feast of merit Dance
- Hòi-ìetsūi: Performs during Tsoukum
- Shāpāutāithîu: Welcome Dance or Warm reception dance
- Khèulàk: Performs on the eve of war
- Nòknàp-ìetsùikūap: Peace Treaty Reception Dance
- Shīkūoh: Vigorious male dance
- tsuichong/huoneu dance: Pre-war dance
- Īlî-tsùihāng: war dance or victory dance
- Khāutsāuhsîe dance: Performs during Khautsausie festival

=== Ritual calendar or local calendar month ===
Patsho Month	English Month	Significance
Khāutsāuhsîe	January	Thanksgiving festival held to mark the end of the old year and welcome the new.
Pǖphìe	February	Sowing millet season; preparation of fields for the coming agricultural cycle.
Mîu	March	Rituals held for upcoming plantation, invoking blessings for a great harvest.
Lūaplō	April	Building hut time after the fields are ready; construction of temporary shelters for the farming season. Lasts for 2 years.
Lîe	May	Sowing season; main planting period for crops.
Pīekānyú	June	The time of millets starting to hold stalk before blooming out into grain. Hence, the grains stalk are tilted and not upright.
Pêi-âm	July	Ritual performed in the granary to prolong the eating of grains and ensure food security.
Pâisǜkhìam	August	Rich forest and its products; season for gathering and utilizing forest resources.
Tsōukūm	September	Rites performed for good crops, seeking protection and abundance for the standing harvest.
Ūvā	October	Clearing of bones; a ritual involving the disposal or cleansing of human bones.
Ālèih-òu	November	Resting time; a period of respite from major agricultural activities.
Pêulīam	December	Harvest time; the time for gathering matured crops and storing them.

=== Traditional natural dyes ===
The village has a long history of obtaining dyes from trees, leaves, barks etc. and have passed down through generations.

Yellow(Āsúo) This colour is procured from Hamshou(Enya acuminata). Initially hamshou leaves are collected and pounded into paste for which it is cooked for long hours until it turns yellow.

Red(Āsīng) The targeted material is cooked with Hamshou leaves until it turns into yellowish colour and this will be the base color for painting red.

Later, another two ingredients such as veih(Rubia Sikimensis)' and the bark of the Longpai(syzygium cumini) are prepared. Subsequently all the materials and dyes of these are cooked together to secure red color.

These colors were mostly painted on traditional garments like structure of the headgear, wrist guards, shin guards, vahtsum etc.

=== Changing culture ===
The culture which was known to be patriarchal is now heading towards inclusivity, advanced and guided by global initiatives like Sustainable development goals of the United Nations.

== Religion ==
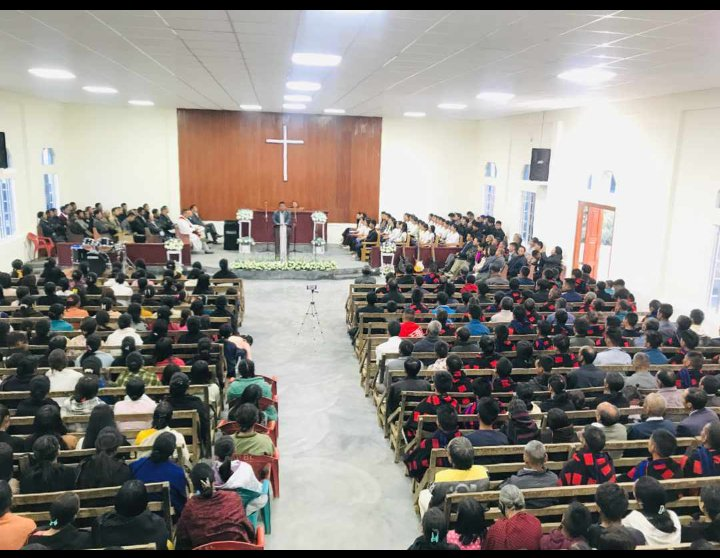
Patsho Baptist Church service

Religion in Patsho (2011)
Religion	Percent
Christians	99.9%
Hindus	0.0%
Muslims	0.0%
Buddhists	0.0%
Others*	0.0%
Distribution of religions: Includes Jains, Sikhs, Animists.

Christianity is the only religion followed by the people and the church has celebrated its 50th anniversary (Golden Jubilee) in 2015.

Sl no	Pastors	Duration
1	Marnungsang Ao	16 June 1962 to 13 February 1963
2	Imna Chungba Ao	
3	Imo Ao	
4	Tongtham	
5	K Shingnyo Patsho	2000-2021
6	Mukom Patsho	2021-incumbent

Sl no	Women Pastors	Duration
1	Mrs.P. Jongtie	1968 to 1969

Sl no	CE and CYE President	Duration
1	Mr. P Khaikho	1968 to 1969

== Demography ==
As per 2011 Indian Census, the total population of the village is 2117, out of which 1060 are male and 1057 female.

== Recreation ==
Recreational activities in Patsho center on traditional festivals, outdoor engagement, community Music & cultural events and sports, though infrastructure remains quite limited.

=== Outdoor activities ===
With the topographical features itself endowed difficult terrain, hiking and trekking is a natural choice for outdoor activities. Some places known for these are Longsheu king located miles away from Yokau village, the Langnyu river and the prominent Mount Khülio-King sited on the eastern edge.

=== Music & cultural events ===
The village itself is known for folkdance and folksongs, hence during cultural events like Tsoukum, Khautsauhsie etc. are the best activities to be involved for recreation which usually takes place at Shiemong Circus, the historic warrior's playground. As the time goes by, the traditional music is going through transformation with the mixture of folksong and modern music known as folkfusion.

=== Sports ===
Football, volley ball and Badminton are the most played sports in the village. However football is usually played at Khaushiu public ground, Pathso Town public ground and the futsal located nearby, all slightly away from the village. Badminton is still played outdoor due to lack of indoor facilities and the volleyball usually played at Shiemong circus.

== Transportation ==
=== Air ===
The nearest airport is Jorhat Airport in Assam located around 250 kilometres from the village. There is a helipad in Noklak, the distance from Patsho to Noklak is 37 km.

=== Rail ===
The nearest railway stations are Dimapur railway station, Amguri railway station and Jorhat Town railway station located around 300 kilometres to 350 kilometres from the village.

=== Road ===
The village is connected with roads. The Patsho Road passes through the district alongside other intra-district roads. The NH 202 and NH 702B are the nearest highways to the village. Both the highways pass through Tuensang.
