= Kingnyu =

Village in Nagaland, India

- village
- Location in Nagaland, India
- Coordinates: 26.115178°N 94.961099°E
- Country: India
- State: Nagaland
- District: Noklak

Population (2011)
  - Total: 1,026

Languages
  - Official: Patsho Khiamniungan
- Time zone: UTC+5:30 (IST)
- Vehicle registration: NL

Kingnyu, also known as Kingniu village, is a village located in Panso circle of Noklak district in Nagaland, India. It is situated 11 km away from sub-district headquarter Panso (tehsildar office), and 91 km away from district headquarter Tuensang. The language most widely spoken is Patsho Khiamniungan, that of the Patsho people there.
