= Lümuoking =

Village in Nagaland, India

- village
- Location in Nagaland, India
- Coordinates: 26.132486°N 94.955448°E
- Country: India
- State: Nagaland
- District: Noklak

Population (2011)
  - Total: 136

Languages
  - Official: Patsho Khiamniungan
- Time zone: UTC+5:30 (IST)
- Vehicle registration: NL

"The Lümuoking Village or Lumoking located in Panso Subdivision, Lumoking population in 2024 is estimated to be 136, According to last census in 2011, 108 People are living in this Village, out of these 46 are males and 62 are females. Population of Lümuoking is 132 in 2023 and 121 inhabitants in 2022. Literate people are 57 out of 27 are male and 30 are female. People living in Lümuoking depend on multiple skills, total workers are 59 out of which men are 24 and women are 35. Total 42 Cultivators are depended on agriculture farming out of 21 are cultivated by men and 21 are women." The language most widely spoken is Patsho Khiamniungan, that of the Patsho people there.

== History ==
Lümuoking is an ancestral village inherited several times before the present day village. It is located to the east of Patsho village and to the west of Tshüvau and Lingnyu villages It is a place where antiques still remains, like Stones and sites of the houses etc. are found, making one of the heritage places in Khiamniungan Land.

== Economy ==
Agriculture is the main source of the economy.
