= Khautsauhsie =

Khautsausie is a harvest festival celebrated every January by the Khiamniungans of Noklak district Nagaland state, India. It is alternatively called and spelled Khaozaosie-Hok-Ah, Khaozaosey-hok-ah and sometimes called Khaozaosie. .

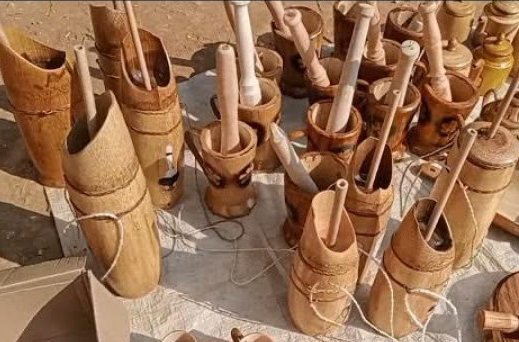
It was used to hold local brew or wine in the olden days

== Significance ==
The term is combination of two words i.e. Khautsau which is derived from the meaning “Bamboo Container with a Straw pipe”, and Sie relates to a brew of local wine. During this festival grains are used as a part of rituals and also for feasting. It is a time of forgiveness and restoration of peace between villagers, sharing food and meat with the kins and fellow communities to ensure strong bondage between kins, relatives and communities. The ceremony is followed by traditional dances by both men and women, and the focus is given on handicrafts, traditional arts, indigenous games and sports.

== History ==
This festival is celebrated by exchanging and sharing drinks and meat with dancing and merry making after burning the fields is done. This festival marked the end of agricultural activities thus precedes the Thanksgiving ceremony. The inclusiveness of the festival exhibits potential tourism in the region and rejuvenation of cultural values ingrained in its history.
