= Khiamniungan =

Khiamniungan or Khiamniungan Naga may be,

- Khiamniungan people
- Khiamniungan language
