= Iekhau =

Village in Nagaland, India

- village
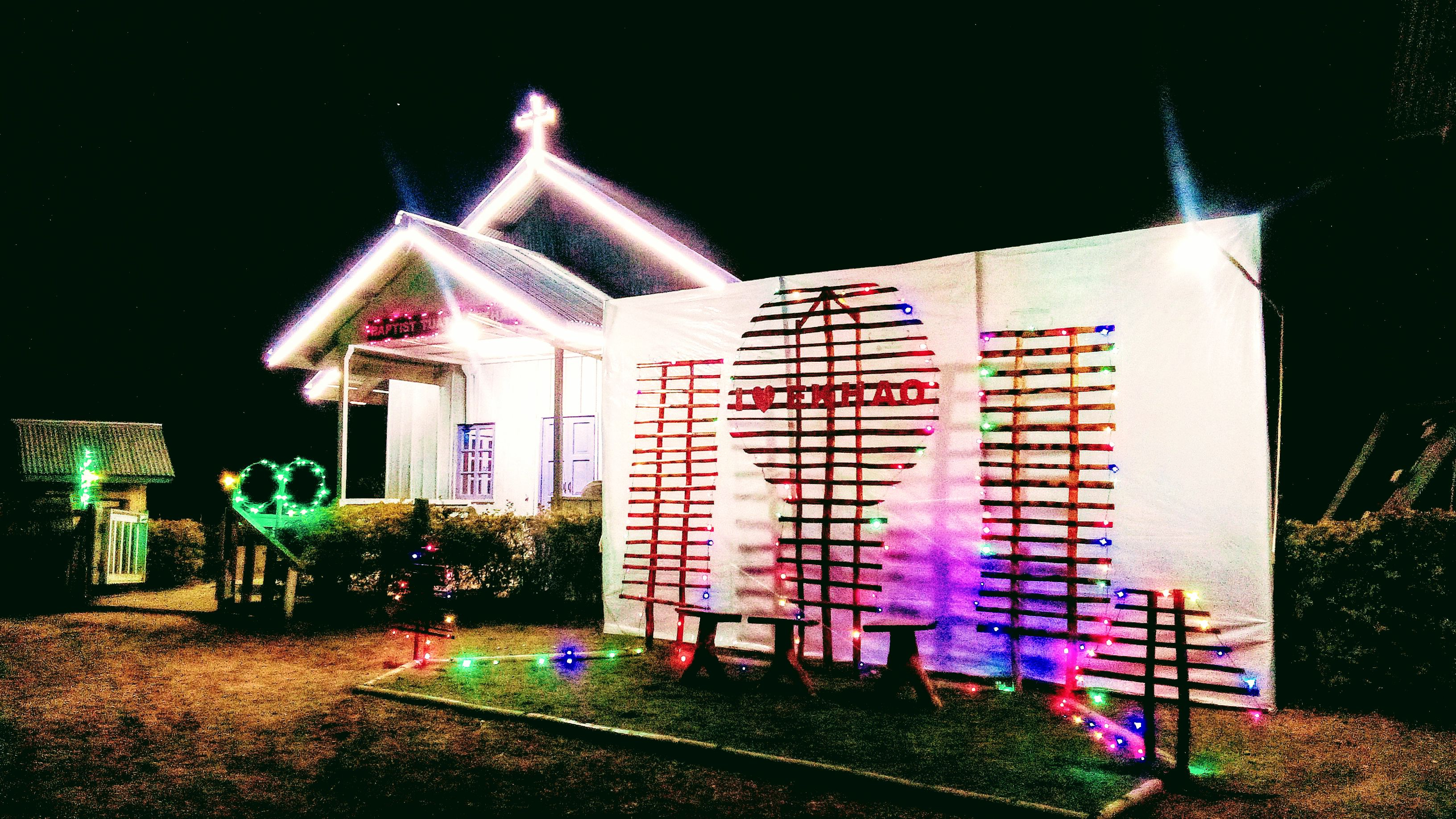
- Īekháu Āmkhámjám
- Nickname: Ekhao
- Location in Nagaland, India
- Coordinates: 26.123931°N 94.937840°E
- Country: India
- State: Nagaland
- District: Noklak

Population (2011)
  - Total: 491

Languages
  - Official: Patsho Khiamniungan
- Time zone: UTC+5:30 (IST)
- Vehicle registration: NL

Iekhau or Ekhao is a village of the Panso taluka, Noklak district in the Indian state of Nagaland. The language most widely spoken is Patsho Khiamniungan, that of the Patsho people there.

== Politics ==
Iekhau village falls under the Noklak District administration, which was carved out of Patsho district in 2014. The village is part of the Thonoknyu Assembly constituency (number 60) in the Nagaland Legislative Assembly.

As of the 2023 Nagaland Legislative Assembly election, the constituency is represented by MLA Shri Benei M. Lamthiu

== Economy ==
The economy of Ekhao village is predominantly agrarian and forest-based, characteristic of remote Khiamniungan Naga villages.

== Agriculture ==
"People living in Iekhau depend on multiple skills, total workers are 211 out of which men are 111 and women are 100. Total 202 Cultivators are depended on agriculture farming out of 106 are cultivated by men and 96 are women."
