= Lingnyu =

Village in Nagaland, India

- village
- Location in Nagaland, India
- Coordinates: 26.173339°N 94.961697°E
- Country: India
- State: Nagaland
- District: Noklak

Population (2011)
  - Total: 1,255

Languages
  - Official: Patsho Khiamniungan
- Time zone: UTC+5:30 (IST)
- Vehicle registration: NL

Lingnyu or Lengnyu village is located in Panso circle of Tuensang district in Nagaland, India. It is situated 21km away from sub-district headquarter Panso (tehsildar office) and 70km away from district headquarter Tuensang. The language most widely spoken is Patsho Khiamniungan, that of the Patsho people there.
