= Tshüvau =

Village in Nagaland, India

- village
- Location in Nagaland, India
- Coordinates: 26.182838°N 94.954198°E
- Country: India
- State: Nagaland
- District: Noklak

Population (2011)
  - Total: 901

Languages
  - Official: Patsho Khiamniungan
- Time zone: UTC+5:30 (IST)
- Vehicle registration: NL

Tshüvau village or Tsuwao village, comprising about 141 households, comes under Patsho Administrative Circle of Noklak district, Nagaland, India. The language most widely spoken is Patsho Khiamniungan, that of the Patsho people there.

== Agriculture ==
People living in Tsuwao depend on multiple skills, total workers are 572 out of which men are 283 and women are 289. Total 355 Cultivators are depended on agriculture farming out of 167 are cultivated by men and 188 are women.
