= Patsho Nokking =

Village in Nagaland, India

- village
- Location in Nagaland, India
- Coordinates: 26.109751°N 94.932123°E
- Country: India
- State: Nagaland
- District: Noklak

Population (2011)
  - Total: 2,880

Languages
  - Official: Patsho Khiamniungan
- Time zone: UTC+5:30 (IST)
- Postal code: 798612
- Vehicle registration: NL

Patsho Nokking Village
Total population
- 2,880 (2011),

Languages
- Patsho Khiamniungan

Religion
- Christianity

Related ethnic groups
- Patsho people

Patsho Nokking (Officially recognized as Pathso Nokeng) village is located in Panso circle of Noklak district in Nagaland, India. It is situated 1 km away from sub-district headquarter Panso (tehsildar office) and 37 km away from district headquarter Noklak. The language most widely spoken is Patsho Khiamniungan, that of the Patsho people.

== Population ==
In 2024 the population is estimated to be 3,629, According to 2011 census, the population was 2880. Out of these, 1497 were males and 1383 were females. Of the population, 885 males and 722 females were found to be literate.

== Agriculture ==
People living in Pathso Nokeng depend on multiple skills, producing varieties of crafts and handlooms.
