= List of Naga tribes =

Naga is an umbrella term for several indigenous communities in Northeast India and Upper Burma. Today, it covers a number of ethnic groups that reside in the Indian states of Nagaland, Manipur, Assam and Arunachal Pradesh and also in Myanmar. Before the arrival of the British, the term "Naga" was used in Assam to refer to certain isolated groups. The British adopted this term for a number of ethnic groups in the surrounding area, based on loose linguistic and cultural associations. Nagaland became the 16th state on 1 December 1965. S. R. Tohring (2010) lists 66 Naga ethnic groups whereas Kibangwar Jamir (2016) lists 67 ethnic groups.

The 1991 Census of India listed 35 Naga tribes as Scheduled Tribes: 17 in Nagaland, 15 in Manipur and 3 in Arunachal Pradesh.

== List of Naga tribes ==
| Tribes | Country | Recognized as Scheduled Tribe by India in | Population | Reference for classification as Naga | Comments |
|---|---|---|---|---|---|
| Anāl | India, Myanmar | Manipur | 72,509 | S.R. Tohring, 2010 | |
| Angami | India | Nagaland | 141,732 | S. R. Tohring, 2010 | |
| Ao | India | Nagaland | 226,625 | S. R. Tohring, 2010 | |
| Chakhesang | India | Manipur, Nagaland | 154,874 | | |
| Chang | India | Nagaland | 64,226 | S. R. Tohring, 2010 | |
| Chirr | India | Nagaland | 138 | S. R. Tohring, 2010 | |
| Chiru | India | Manipur | 8,599 | S. R. Tohring, 2010 | |
| Chothe | India | Manipur | 3,585 | S. R. Tohring, 2010 | |
| Inpui | India | Manipur | | S. R. Tohring, 2010 | Part of Zeliangrong |
| Kharam (also Purum) | India | Manipur | 1,145 | S. R. Tohring, 2010 | |
| Khiamniungan | Myanmar, India | Nagaland | 61,647 and 120,000 approx. in Myanmar | S. R. Tohring, 2010 | Also known as Nokow (Noko) in Myanmar. |
| Konyak | Myanmar, India | Nagaland | 205,458 | S. R. Tohring, 2010 | |
| Kom people | India | Manipur | | | |
| Lamkang | India | Manipur | 7,770 | S. R. Tohring, 2010 | |
| Lainong | Myanmar | Sagaing | 22,617 | Anui Sainyiu, 2002; S. R. Tohring, 2010 | Also known as Htangngan |
| Liangmai | India | Nagaland, Manipur | | | Part of Zeliangrong |
| Lotha | India | Nagaland | 173,111 | S. R. Tohring, 2010 | |
| Makury (sometimes spelt Makuri) | Myanmar, India | | | S. R. Tohring, 2010 | Considered part of Yimkhiung in Nagaland, India |
| Mao (also Ememei) | India | Manipur | 97,195 | S. R. Tohring, 2010 | Khrasi |
| Maram | India | Manipur | 27,524 | S. R. Tohring, 2010 | |
| Maring | India | Manipur | 26,424 | S. R. Tohring, 2010 | |
| Monsang | India | Manipur | 2,427 | S. R. Tohring, 2010 | |
| Moyon | Myanmar, India | Manipur | 2,516 | S. R. Tohring, 2010 | Moyon Naga. |
| Nocte (or Nokte) | India | Arunachal Pradesh | 111,679 | | Part of Tangshang Naga. |
| Para | Myanmar | | | S. R. Tohring, 2010 | |
| Phom | India | Nagaland | 52,682 | S. R. Tohring, 2010 | |
| Pochury | India | Nagaland | 21,948 | S. R. Tohring, 2010 | |
| Poumai | India | Manipur | 187,180 | S. R. Tohring, 2010 | |
| Purum | India | Manipur | | | |
| Rengma | India | Assam, Nagaland | 85,000 | S. R. Tohring, 2010 | |
| Rongmei | India | Assam, Nagaland, Manipur | 170,800 | S. R. Tohring, 2010 | Part of Zeliangrong |
| Sangtam | India | Nagaland | 74,994 | S. R. Tohring, 2010 | |
| Sümi (or Sema) | India | Nagaland | 236,313 | S. R. Tohring, 2010 | |
| Tangkhul | India, Myanmar | Manipur | 178,568 | | |
| Tangsa (or Tase in language coding name) | India, Myanmar | Arunachal Pradesh | 15,295 | S. R. Tohring, 2010 | Known as Tangshang in Myanmar |
| Tarao | India | Manipur | 1,066 | S. R. Tohring, 2010 | |
| Thangal | India | Manipur | | S. R. Tohring, 2010 | |
| Tikhir | India | Nagaland | 7,537 | S. R. Tohring, 2010 | |
| Tutsa | India | Arunachal Pradesh | | Robin Tribhuwan, 2005 | It is a sub-tribe of Tangshang Naga. |
| Wancho | India | Arunachal Pradesh | 56,886 | S. R. Tohring, 2010 | It is a sub-tribe of Tangshang Naga. |
| Yimkhiung | Myanmar, India | Nagaland | 66,972 | S. R. Tohring, 2010 | |
| Zeme | India | Nagaland, Assam & Manipur | | S.R.Tohring | Part of Zeliangrong Community |

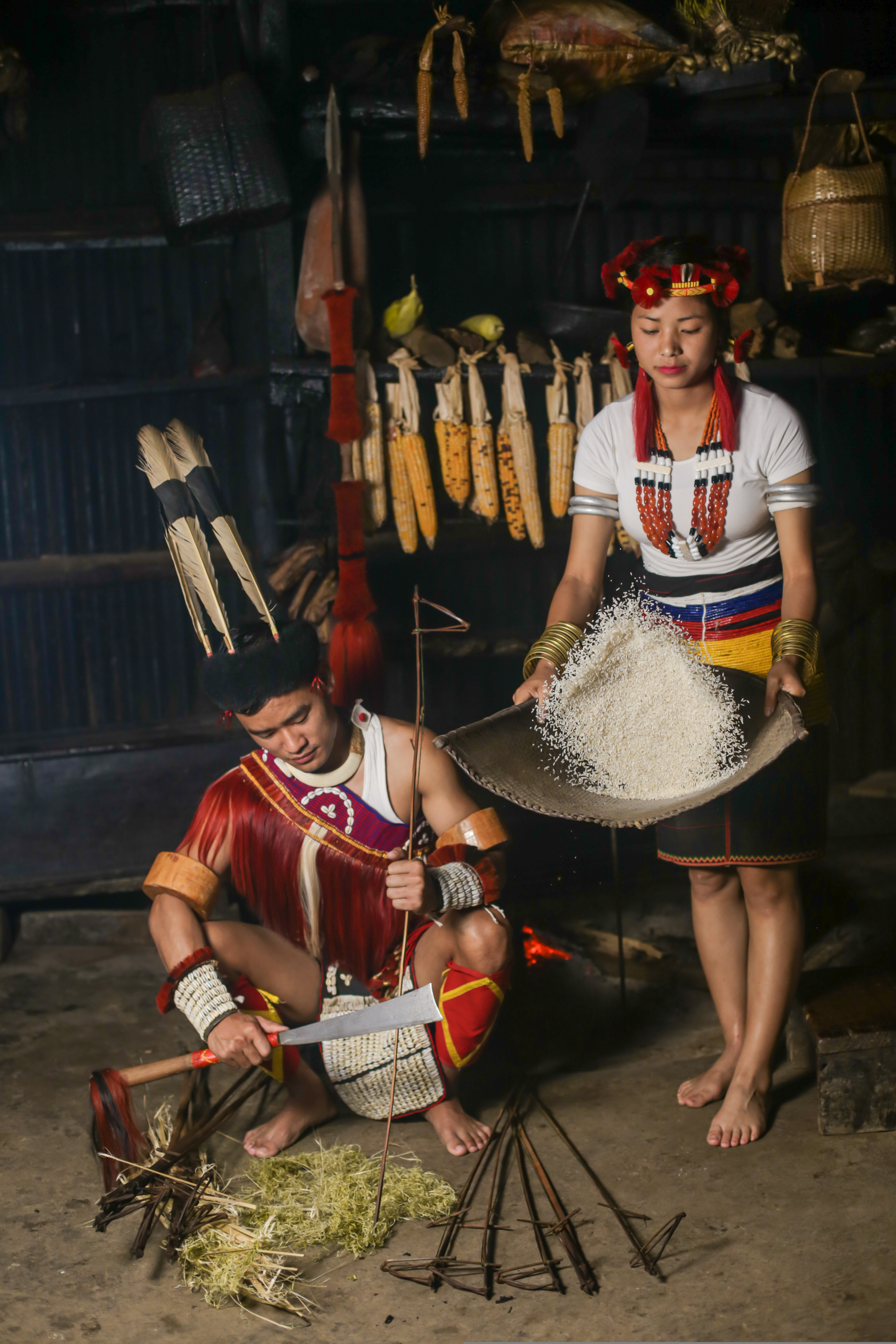
A Sumi Naga Couple in traditional attire

Angami women

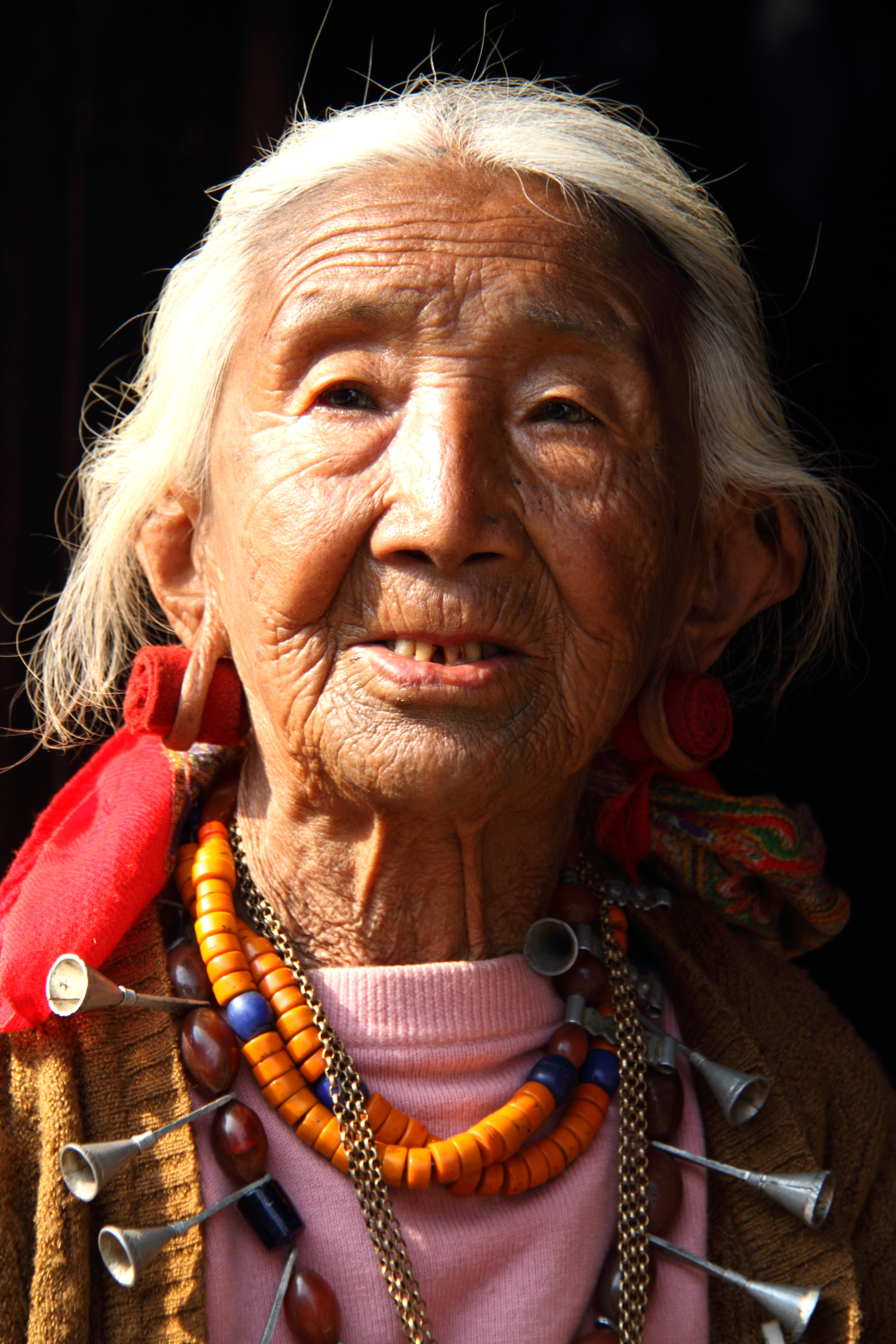
Ao woman in traditional attire

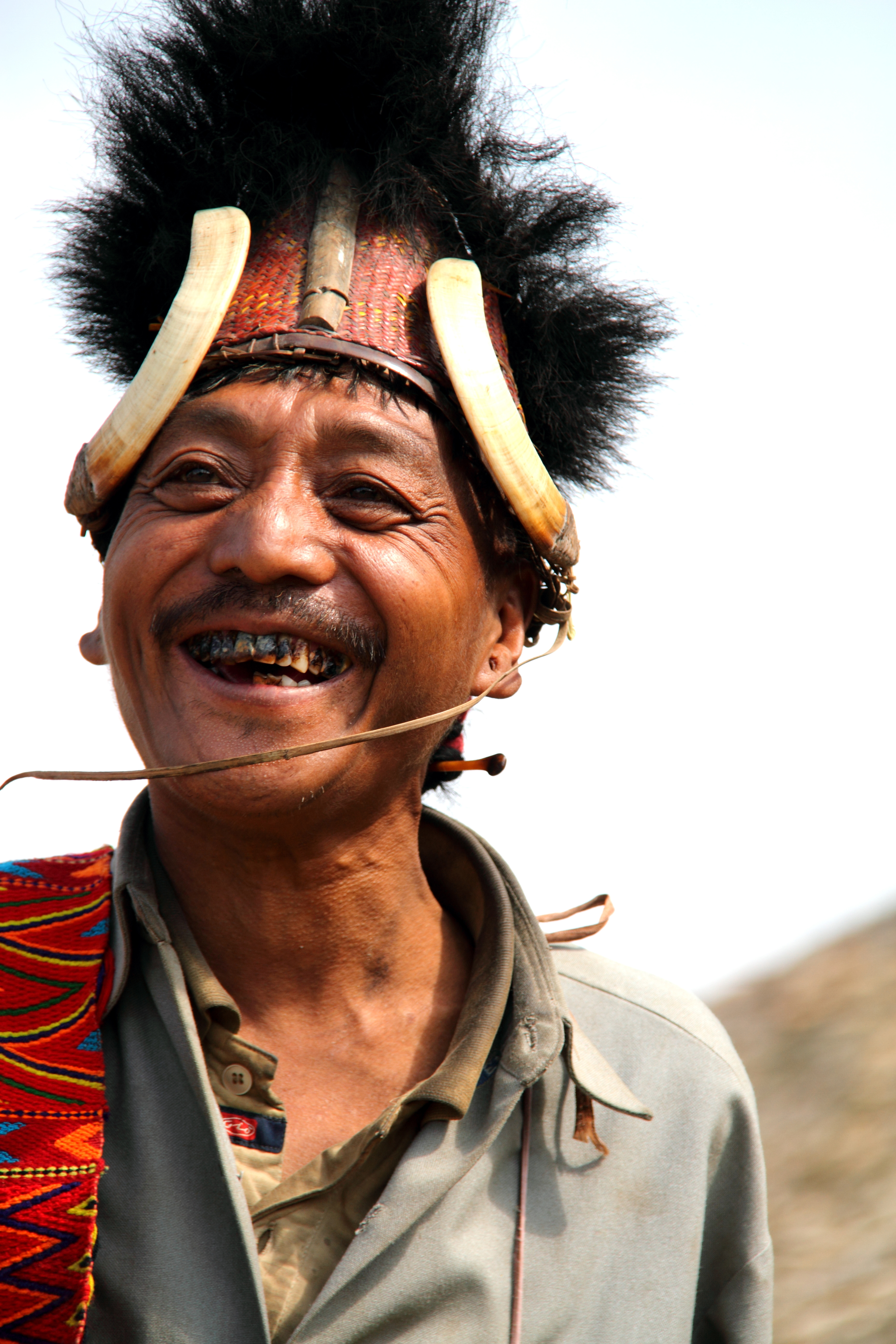
A Konyak chief in his traditional outfit

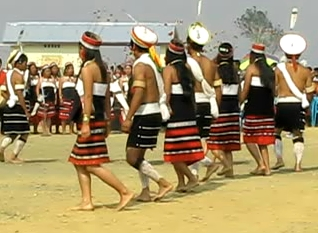
Liangmai youths performing folk dance during Road Show in Peren, Nagaland

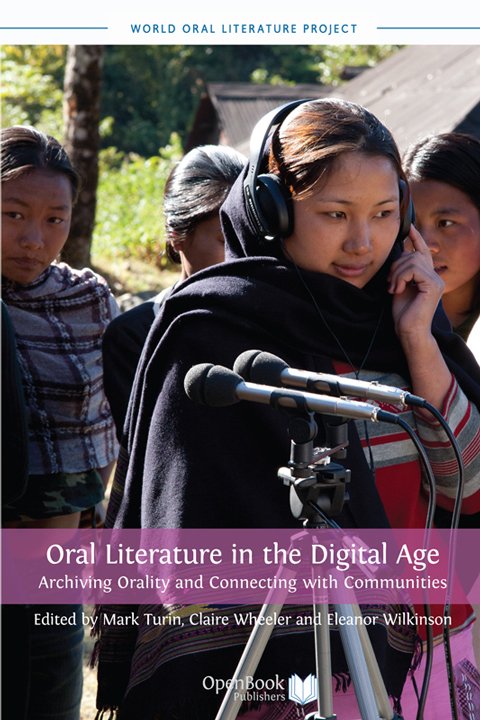
A Pochury woman on a book cover

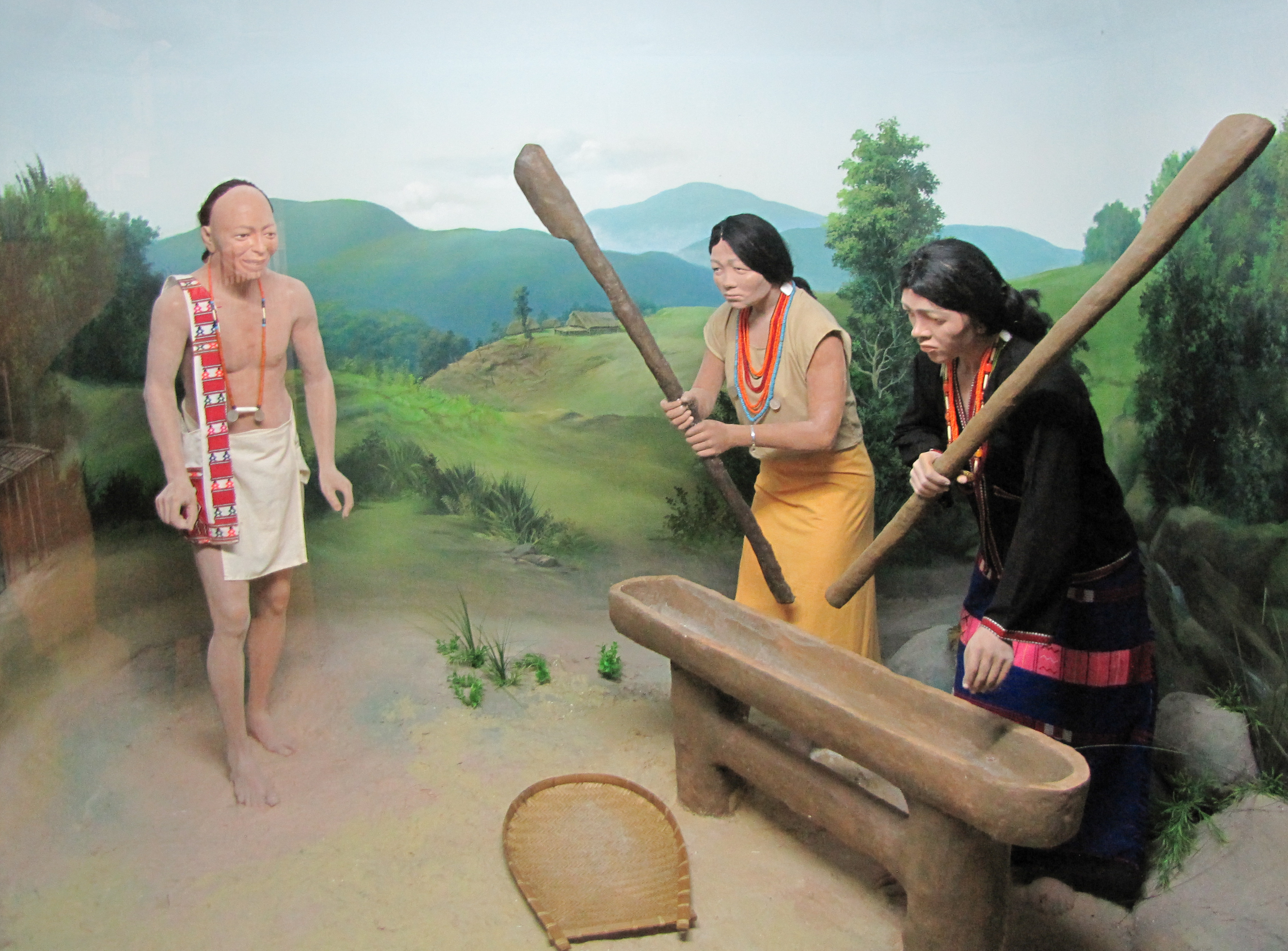
A diorama and wax figures of Nocte people in a museum

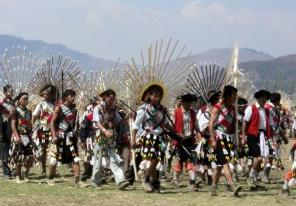
Glory Day celebration of the Poumai Naga

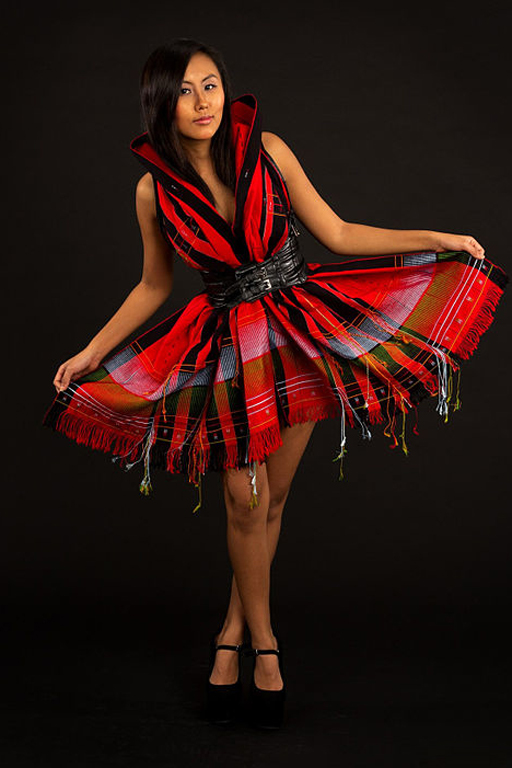
Tangkhul girl in a modern adaptation of the traditional dress

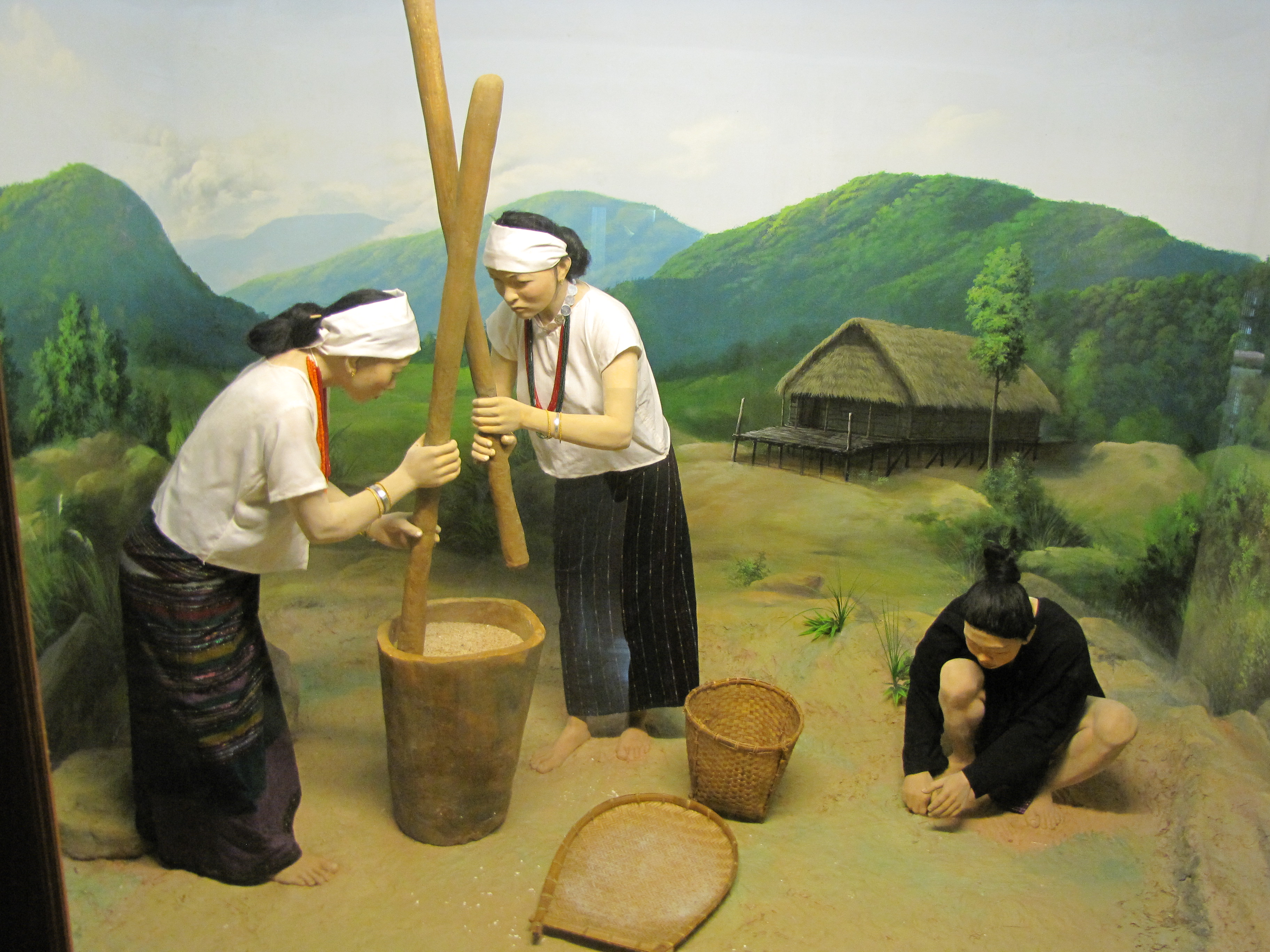
A diorama and wax figures of Tangsa people in a museum

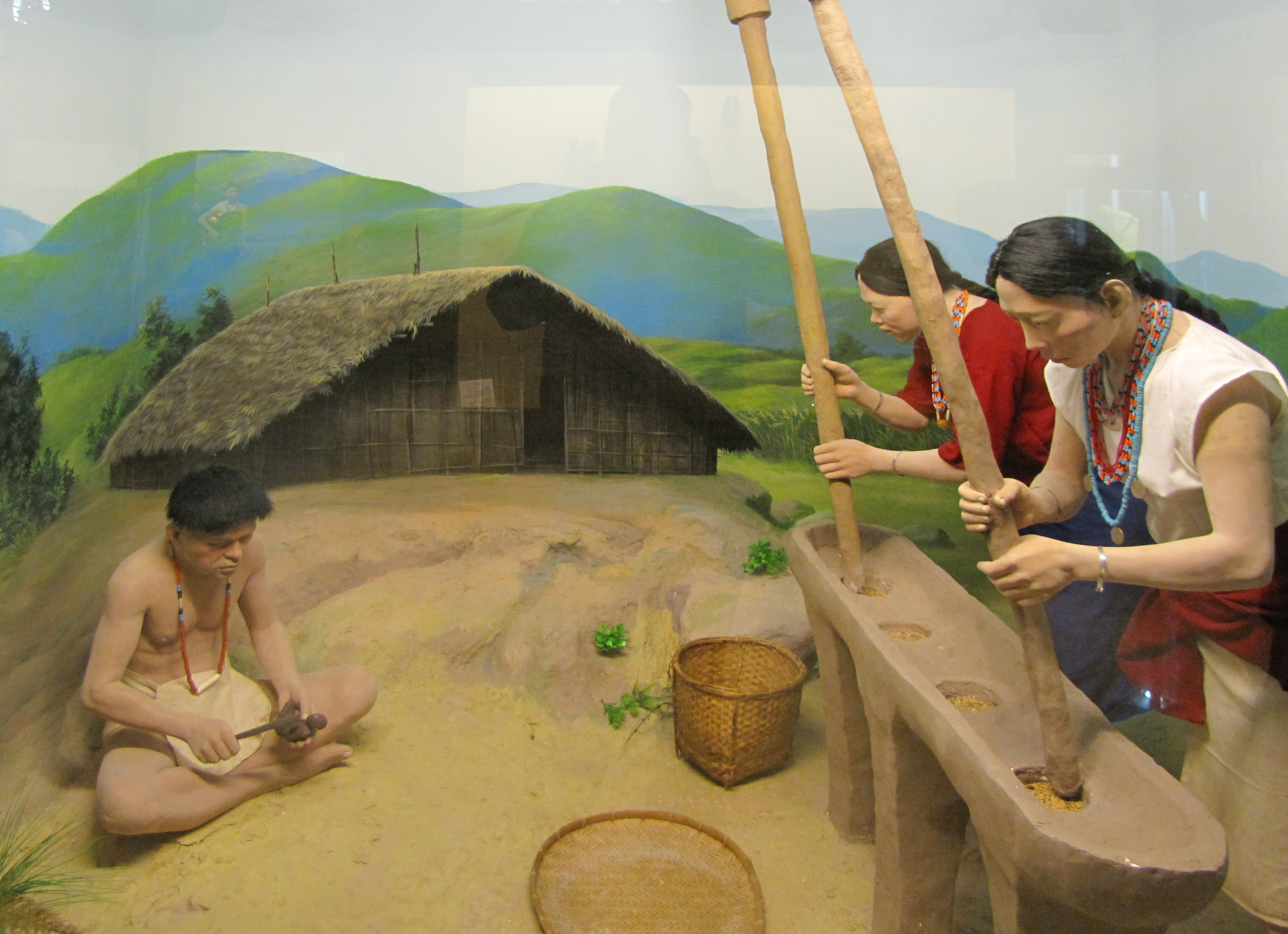
A diorama and wax figures of the Wancho people in a museum

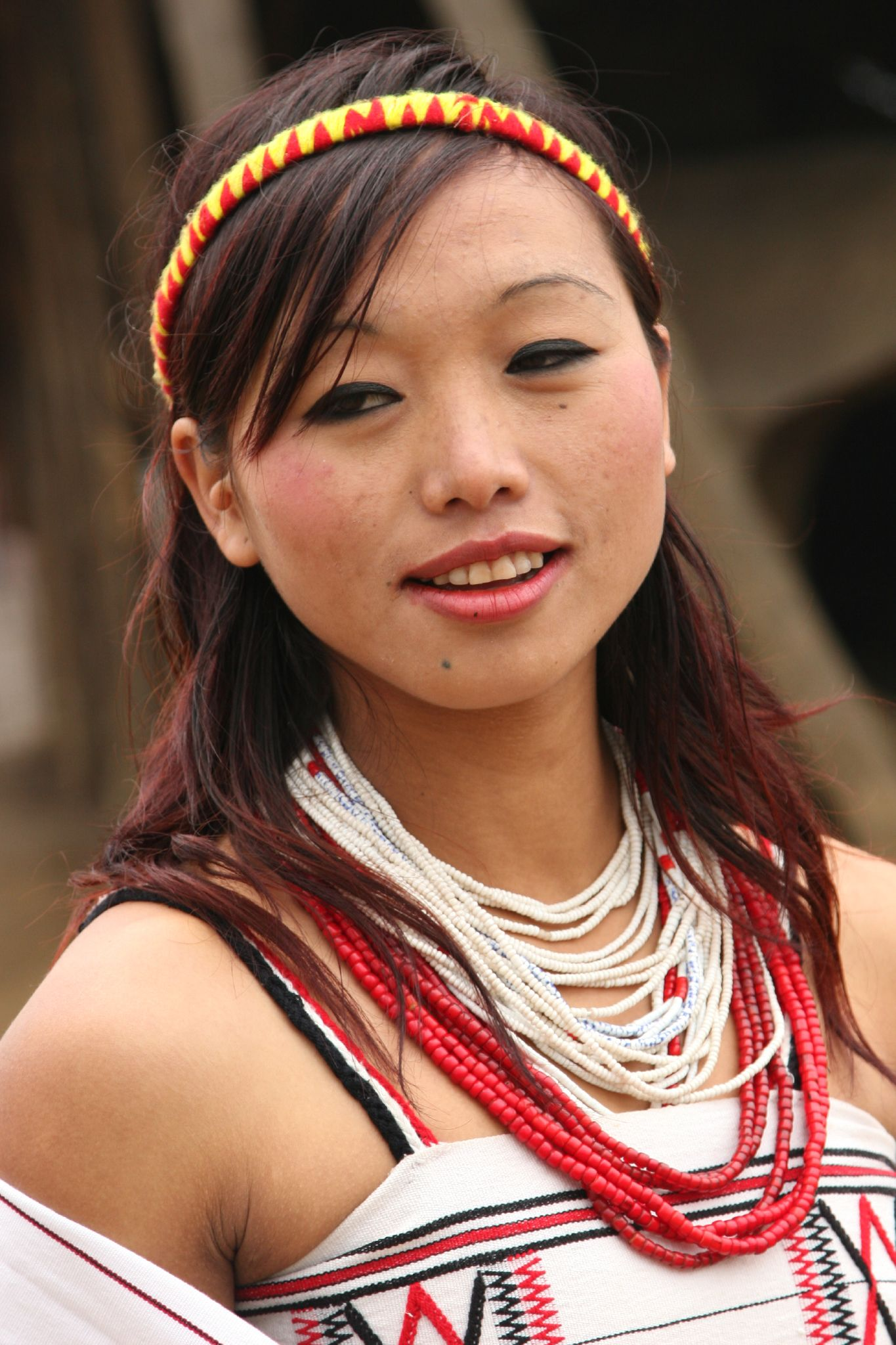
Yimkhiung girl at the Kutur village morung

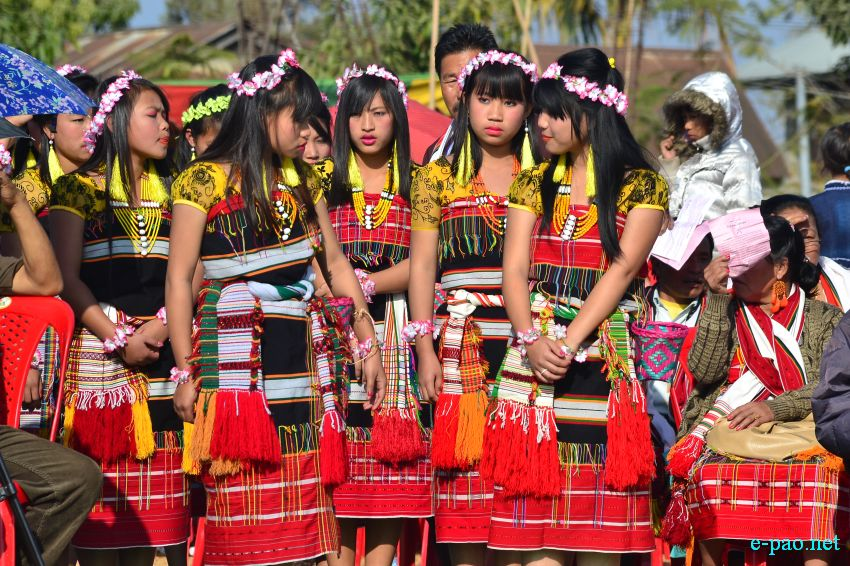
Rongmeis of Manipur during Gaan-Ngai 2014 at Keikhu, Kabui Village

== Naga tribes with limited recognition ==
| Ethnic group | Country | State | Reference for classification as Naga | Comments |
|---|---|---|---|---|
| Khoibu | India | Manipur | Romesh Singh, 2006 | Also considered as a clan of Maring |
| Heimi Naga (also Haimi or Hemi) | Myanmar | | S. R. Tohring, 2010 | Limited scope of former name of Tangshang |
| Pangmi Naga | Myanmar | | S. R. Tohring, 2010 | Limited scope of former name of Tangshang |
| Muklom Naga | India | | S. R. Tohring, 2010 | Clan of Tangsa/Tangshang Naga |
| Rangpang Naga | India | Arunachal Pradesh | S. R. Tohring, 2010 | Limited scope of former name of Tangshang |
| Ollo Naga (Lazu) | India | Arunachal Pradesh | | Also considered as a clan of Nocte |
| Koka Naga (Goga) | Myanmar | | S. R. Tohring, 2010 | sometimes considered as a clan of Somra Tangkhul |
| Longphuri Naga | Myanmar | | S. R. Tohring, 2010 | Also considered as a clan of Makury |
| Makyam Naga (Paung Nyuan) | Myanmar | | S. R. Tohring, 2010 | Also considered as a clan of Khiamniungan Naga |
| Tikhak Naga | India, Myanmar | Arunachal Pradesh | S. R. Tohring, 2010 | Also considered as a clan of Tangsa/Tangshang Naga |

== Composite ethnic groups or communities ==
=== Pakan ===
Anāl, Maring, Lamkang, Moyon, Monsang, Khoibu

=== Tangshang ===
A combination term, Tang from Tangnyu Vang (Wang) and Shang from Shangnyu Vang (Wang) chieftains, which were formerly known as and includes Heimi (Haimi), Pangmi, Rangpang, Tangsa, Wancho, Nocte, and Tutsa now.

=== Tenyimi ===
Angami, Chakhesang, Inpui, Liangmai, Mao, Maram, Pochury, Poumai, Rengma, Rongmei, Thangal, Zeme, and Northern villages of Jessami, Soraphung and Chingjaroi (Swemi) in Ukhrul district.

Angami: Chakhro Angami, Northern Angami, Southern Angami, Western Angami

Chakhesang: Chokri, Khezha and formerly Pochury (Southern Sangtam) combined

Shepfomei or Shepoumai (Mao–Poumai): Ememei, Lepaona, Chiliivai and Paomata together

Zeliangrong: Zeme, Liangmai, Rongmei and Inpui

Northern Ukhrul: Villages of Jessami, Soraphung (Krowemi), Chingjaroi (Asinei) In Northern Ukhrul District
