= Ethnic groups in South Asia =

Ethnic groups in South Asia are ethnolinguistic groupings within the diverse populations of South Asia, including the countries of Bangladesh, Bhutan, India, Maldives, Nepal, Pakistan, and Sri Lanka. Afghanistan is variously considered to be a part of both Central Asia and South Asia, which means Afghans are not always included among South Asians, but when they are, South Asia has a total population of about 2.04 billion.

The majority of the population fall within three large linguistic groups: Indo-Aryan, Dravidian, and Iranic. These groups are also further subdivided into numerous sub-groups, castes and tribes. Indo-Aryans form the predominant ethnolinguistic group in India (North India, East India, West India, and Central India), Bangladesh, Pakistan, Nepal, Sri Lanka, and the Maldives. Dravidians form the predominant ethnolinguistic group in southern India, the northern and eastern regions of Sri Lanka and a small pocket of Pakistan. The Iranic peoples also have a significant presence in South Asia, the large majority of whom are located in Afghanistan and the northwestern and western parts of Pakistan.

Minority groups not falling within either large group mostly speak languages belonging to the Austroasiatic and Tibeto-Burman language families, and largely live around Ladakh and Northeast India, Nepal, Bhutan, and the Chittagong Hill Tracts of Bangladesh. The Andamanese (Sentinel, Onge, Jarawa, and Great Andamanese) live in some of the Andaman Islands and speak a language isolate, as do the Kusunda in central Nepal, the Vedda in Sri Lanka, and the Nihali of Central India, who number about 5,000 people. The people of the Hunza Valley in Pakistan are another distinct population; they speak Burushaski, a language isolate.

The traditions of different ethnic groups in South Asia have diverged, influenced by external cultures, especially in the northwestern parts of South Asia and also in the border regions and busy ports, where there are greater levels of contact with external cultures. There is also a lot of genetic diversity within the region. For example, most of the ethnic groups of the northeastern parts of South Asia are genetically related to peoples of East or Southeast Asia. There are also genetically isolated groups who have not been genetically influenced by other groups, such as the Jarawa people of the Andaman Islands. The largest ethnolinguistic group in South Asia are the Indo-Aryans, numbering around 1 billion, and the largest subgroup are the native speakers of Hindi languages, numbering more than 470 million.

These groups are based solely on a linguistic basis and not on a genetic basis.

== List of ethnic groups on the basis of language ==
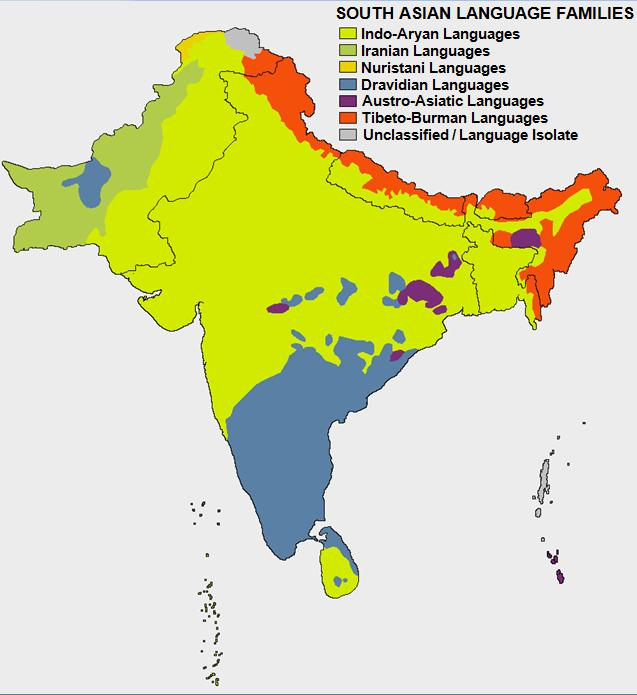
South Asian language families

=== Andamanese groups ===
- Great Andamanese
- Jangil
- Jarawa
- Onge
- Sentinelese

=== Austroasiatic people ===
- Khasi people
  - Pnar/Jaintia
- Munda peoples
  - Asur people
  - Birhor people
  - Bhumij people
  - Bonda people
  - Ho people
  - Juang people
  - Kharia people
  - Korku people
  - Mahle people
  - Mundari people
  - Santali people
  - Sora people
- Nicobarese people
- Shompen people

=== Austronesian people ===
- Sri Lankan Malays

=== Dravidian people ===
- Badagas
- Brahui people
- Gondi people
- Irulas
- Kannadigas
- Khond people
- Kodava
- Kurukh/Oraon
- Malayali
- Malto people
  - Sauria Paharia people
- Tamil people
  - Indian Tamils
    - Indian Tamils of Sri Lanka
  - Sri Lankan Tamils
- Telugu people
- Toda people
- Tulu people

=== Indo-Aryan people ===
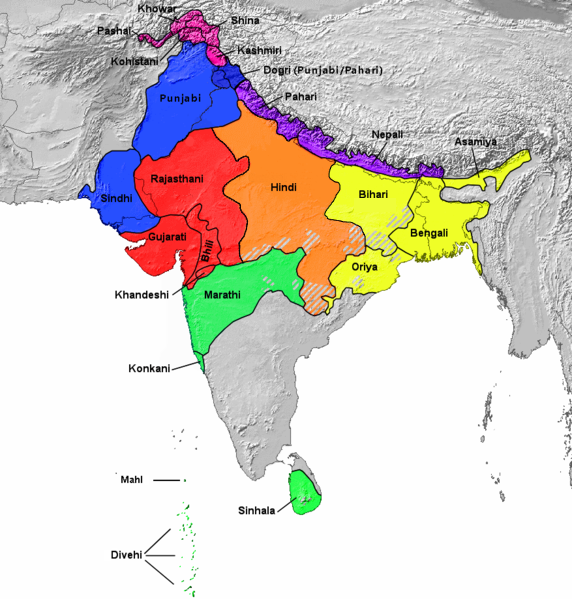
The extent of Indo-Aryan languages in South Asia

- Assamese people
- Awadhi people
- Baiga people
- Banjara people
- Bhojpuri people
- Bhoksa people
- Bengali people
- Bhil people
- Brokpa people
- Chitrali people
- Deccani people
- Dhivehi people
- Dogra people
- Garhwali people
- Gurjars
- Gujarati people
- Haryanvi people
- Indus Kohistani people
- Kalash people
- Kamrupi people
- Kashmiri people
- Khas people
- Kho people
- Konkani people
- Kumaoni people
- Kutchi people
- Maithili people
- Maldivian people
- Marathi people
- Magahi people
- Meo (ethnic group)
- Meena people
- Muhajir people
- Nagpuria people
- Odia people
- Pahari people (Kashmir)
- Pahari people (Nepal)
- Parsi people
- Pashayi people
- Punjabi people
  - Hindkowans
- Rajbongshi people
- Rajasthani people
  - Marwaris
- Rohingya people
- Sindhi people
  - Memons
- Saraiki people
- Saurashtra people
- Sinhalese people
- Shina people
- Sylheti people
- Tirahi people
- Tharu people
- Torwali people

=== Iranic people ===
- Afghan Qizilbash
- Aimaq people
- Baloch people
- Hazara people
- Irani people
- Pamiris
- Pashtun people
  - Rohilla people
- Tajiks of Pakistan
- Wakhi people
- Yidgha-Munji people

=== Nuristani people ===
- Nuristani people
  - Kata people
  - Kom people
  - Mumo people

=== Semitic people ===
- Arabs or Jews and mixed
  - Arabs in Gujarat
  - Sri Lankan Moors (trace ancestry to Arab traders who settled in Sri Lanka and native Tamil women)
  - Iraqi biradri - a community of Muslims in north India (trace ancestry from Arab tribe of Bani Tamim)
  - Labbay Arab traders who settled in South India
  - Konkani Muslims trace their ancestry to Arab traders.
  - Mappila Muslims trace their ancestry to Arab traders.
  - Chaush trace ancestors to traders from Yemen.
  - Nasrani Mapilla who trace their origins to Jewish traders
  - Knanaya Syriac Christians who trace their origins to Mesopotamia
  - Thangal
- Arabs in Afghanistan
- Indian Jews
  - Cochin Jews (Malayali Jews)
  - Bene Israel (Marathi Jews)
  - Baghdadi Jews (Arab Jews in Bengal)
  - Bnei Menashe (Mizo and Kuki Jews)
  - Bene Ephraim (Telugu Jews)
  - Paradesi Jews (European Jews in India)

=== Tai people ===
- Ahom people
- Tai Aiton
- Tai Phake or Tai Phakial

=== Tibeto-Burman people ===
- Bodo–Kachari people
  - Bodo
  - Dimasa
  - Garo
  - Hajong
  - Sonowal
  - Sutiya
- Chakma people
- Chepang
- Gurung
- Khowa
- Kirati people
  - Rai
  - Limbu
  - Yakkha
  - Sunuwar
  - Jirel
  - Hayu
  - Dhimal
- Lepcha people
- Magar people
- Memba
- Meitei people (Manipuri people)
- Naga people
  - Anāl people
  - Angami Naga
    - Southern Angami
  - Ao Naga
  - Chakhesang Naga
  - Chang Naga
  - Chiru Naga
  - Chothe people
  - Khiamniungan Naga
  - Konyak Naga
  - Lainong Naga
  - Lamkang people
  - Lotha Naga
  - Mao people
  - Maram people
  - Maring people
  - Monsang people
  - Moyon Naga
  - Nocte Naga
  - Para Naga
  - Poumai people
  - Phom Naga
  - Pochury Naga
  - Rengma Naga
  - Sangtam Naga
  - Sümi Naga
  - Tangkhul people
  - Tangsa Naga
  - Tarao people
  - Thangal people
  - Tikhir Naga
  - Tutsa Naga
  - Wancho Naga
  - Yimkhiung Naga
    - Chirr Naga
    - Makury Naga
  - Zeliangrong
    - Inpui people
    - Liangmai people
    - Rongmei people
    - Zeme Naga
- Newar people
- Nishi
- Rakhine
- Tamang
- Thakali
- Tibetans and Tibetan-speaking peoples
  - Tibetan Ladakhis
  - Uttarakhandi Bhotiya
  - Sikkimese people
    - Bhutias
  - Monpa
    - Takpa
    - Tshangla
  - Sherpas
  - Bhotiyas
  - Sherdukpen
  - Aka
  - Miji
  - Tibetan Muslim
    - Burig
    - Baltis
- Tripuri
- Karbi people or Mikir
- Thami
- Zo people
  - Bawm people
  - Chin
  - Kuki
    - Halam
    - Hrangkhol
  - Mizo

=== Turkic people ===
- Turks in India
- Rowther are descendants of Seljuk Turks in Turko-Persian tradition. They have since become the tradition of Turko-Indian in 11th Century.
- Turkic people in Afghanistan
  - Uzbeks
  - Afghan Turkmens
- Mughal (Moghul) (A Sunni Islamic dynasty of Asia which originated in Central Asia)
  - Chughtai Tartars (Those people who originated in Uzbekistan and fought for Chagatai Khan who was son of Genghis Khan).
  - Barlas (A Turkified Mongol tribe to which Babur belonged)
  - Changezi (Those who were in army of Hulagu Khan)
- Turkic people in Pakistan
  - Kyrgyz in Pakistan
  - Turkmen in Pakistan
  - Uyghurs in Pakistan
  - Uzbeks in Pakistan

=== Linguistic isolate groups ===
- Hunza people
- Kusunda
- Nahali
- Vedda

=== Afro-Asian groups ===
- Chaush
- Sheedis/Siddis, an ethnic community of Black African descent, found primarily in Pakistan, Gujarat, and Karnataka.
- Sri Lanka Kaffirs

=== European and Eurasian people ===
- Anglo-Burmese
- Anglo-Indian
- Bangladeshi-Armenians
- Burgher people
- French-Indian
- Luso-Indian

=== East Asian people ===
- Chinese diaspora in South Asia
  - Bangladeshi Chinese
  - Indian Chinese
  - Pakistani Chinese
  - Sri Lankan Chinese

== Diaspora ==
Many South Asian ethnic groups and nationalities have substantial diasporas.

- South Asian American
  - Bangladeshi American
  - Bengali American
  - Gujarati American
  - Indian American
    - Indo-Caribbean American
    - Indo-Fijian American
  - Nepalese American
  - Afghan Americans
  - Bhutanese Americans
  - Maldivian Americans
  - Pakistani American
  - Punjabi American
  - Sindhi American
  - Sri Lankan American
  - Tamil American
  - Telugu American
- South Asian Canadian
  - Bangladeshi Canadian
  - Indo-Canadian
  - Nepalese Canadian
  - Pakistani Canadian
  - Afghan Canadian
  - Sri Lankan Canadian
  - Tamil Canadian
- British South Asian
  - British Bangladeshi
  - British Indian
    - British Indo-Caribbean people
  - British Nepalese
  - British Pakistani
  - British Afghans
  - British Tamil
  - Sri Lankans in the United Kingdom
  - Mauritians in the United Kingdom
  - Asian-Scots
- South Asian Australian
  - Bangladeshi Australian
  - Indian Australian
  - Nepalese Australian
  - Pakistani Australian
  - Sri Lankan Australian
- Indian New Zealanders
- Malaysian Indian
  - Tamil Malaysians
  - Chitty
- Indians in Singapore
- Nepalis in Singapore
- Nepalese people in Malaysia
- Indian Indonesian
- Indo-Mauritian
  - Bihari Mauritian
- Indo-Caribbean
  - Indians in Barbados
  - Indians in Belize
  - Indians in the Dominican Republic
  - Indians in French Guiana
  - Indo-Grenadians
  - Indians in Guadeloupe
  - Indo-Guyanese
  - Indo-Haitians
  - Indo-Jamaican
  - Indo-Martiniquais
  - Indo-Saint Lucian
  - Indo-Surinamese
  - Indo-Trinidadian and Tobagonian
  - Indo-Vincentian
- Indians in South America
  - Indians in Argentina
  - Indians in Brazil
  - Indians in Panama
  - Indians in Venezuela
- Burmese Indians
- South Asians in Hong Kong
- South Asians in the Philippines
- South Asians in the Netherlands
- Indians in Germany
- Nepalis in Germany
- Indian diaspora in Southeast Africa
  - Indian South Africans
    - Tamil South Africans
  - Indians in Botswana
  - Indians in Kenya
  - Indians in Madagascar
  - Indo-Mauritian
    - Bihari Mauritian
  - Indians in Mozambique
  - Indo-Réunionnaise
  - Indo-Seychellois
  - Indians in Tanzania
  - Indians in Uganda
  - Indians in Zambia
  - Indians in Zimbabwe
- Indians in Iran
- Indians in Kuwait
- Indians in Thailand
- Indians in the United Arab Emirates
- Indians in Vietnam
- Indians in Qatar
- Indians in Bahrain
- Indians in Panama
- Indian diaspora in France
- Indians in Israel
- Indians in Italy
- Indians in Portugal
- Indian community in Spain
- Indo-Fijian
  - South Indians in Fiji
- Lhotshampa
- Muhajir people

See also Bangladeshi diaspora, Indian diaspora, Nepalese diaspora, Pakistani diaspora, Afghan diaspora, and .

=== Ethnolinguistic diasporas ===
- Bengali diaspora
- Bihari diaspora
- Gujarati diaspora
- Kashmiri diaspora
- Malayali diaspora
- Marathi diaspora
- Mizo diaspora
- Odia diaspora
- Punjabi diaspora
- Sindhi diaspora
- Tamil diaspora
  - Puducherry diaspora
  - Sri Lankan Tamil diaspora
  - Tamil Nadu diaspora
- Telugu diaspora
- Sindhi diaspora
- South Indian diaspora

=== Other diasporas ===
Two (or possibly three) other people groups have ethnic and linguistic ties with the region:

- Dom people
- Romani people
- Lom people (who speak a language both related to Indo-Aryan and Armenian)

== See also ==
- Immigration to Bangladesh
- Immigration to India
- Languages of South Asia
- Languages of Bangladesh
- Languages of Bhutan
- Languages of India
- Languages of Maldives
- Languages of Nepal
- Languages of Pakistan
- Languages of Sri Lanka
- List of indigenous peoples of South Asia
- List of Scheduled Tribes in India
- Scheduled Castes and Scheduled Tribes
- South Asian diaspora
- Desi
- Ethnic groups in Pakistan
- Ethnic groups in Nepal
- Genetics and archaeogenetics of South Asia
- Y-DNA haplogroups in populations of South Asia

National demographics:

- Demographics of Bangladesh
- Demographics of Bhutan
- Demographics of India
- Demographics of the Maldives
- Demographics of Nepal
- Demographics of Pakistan
- Demographics of Sri Lanka
