= Frontier Nagaland =

- region
- District of Frontier Nagaland
- Country: India
- State: Nagaland
- District: Kiphire; Longleng; Mon; Noklak; Shamator; Tuensang

Languages
  - Official: English
  - Other: Chang, Chirr, Khiamniungan, Konyak, Phom, Sangtam, Sema, Tikhir, Yimkhiungrü
- Time zone: UTC+5:30 (IST)
- Largest city: Tuensang
- Districts: 6

Frontier Nagaland is a region of the Indian state of Nagaland. It comprises the eastern districts of Nagaland.

== History ==
Earlier the region was part of Tuensang Frontier Division as part of North-East Frontier Agency (present day Arunachal Pradesh) until 1957. The area was transferred to Naga Hills District of United Assam state until 1962 after which it became part of present day Nagaland. The division was renamed as Tuensang Naga Hills District.

== Districts ==
The region comprises following districts,

The seventeen districts of Nagaland
1. Kiphire district
2. Longleng district
3. Mon district
4. Noklak district
5. Shamator district
6. Tuensang district

== Separate state demand ==
Separate state demand has been raised by the region's apex organisation called Eastern Nagaland People's Organisation. They argue that the region which is already economically backward, is further being ignored by the state government and is given a step-motherly treatment. Basic infrastructure like road, communications, educational institutions, and medical institutions are in no condition to provide decent services. The demand has strong support in the region and is based on popular grassroots resolution encompassing every village council and tribal council, students organisations and general public of Eastern Nagaland. ENPO delegation has met the Union Home Minister Amit Shah who said that the grievances and request for a separate entity was understood. After several high level meetings between ENPO and the Government of India, the MHA has agreed to offer a 'Frontier Naga Territory', however they haven’t fulfilled the promise yet for which ENPO is still fighting.

During 2024 Indian general election, ENPO declared boycotted the election and voter turnout in these districts were almost zero percentage.

On 9th August 2024, Nagaland Lok Sabha MP S. Supongmeren Jamir raised the Frontier Nagaland question in the parliament. He cautioned the government of the socio-political consequences in the state for ignoring the status. He urged the Home Ministry to provide a status on the memorandum between the governments of India, Nagaland and ENPO.
