= Shamator =

Town in Nagaland, India

- Town
- Location in Nagaland, India
- Coordinates: 26.0744529°N 94.855362°E
- Country: India
- State: Nagaland
- District: Shamator District

Government
  - MLA: S Keoshu Yimchunger (Naga People's Front)

Population (2011)
  - Town: 5,811
  - Urban: 4,257
  - Rural: 1,554

Languages
  - Official: English
  - Native: Yimkhiungrü; Tikhir
- Time zone: UTC+5:30
- PIN CODE: 798612
- Sex ratio: 983/1000 ♂/♀
- Literacy: 37.44%

Shamator is a town and the headquarters of the Shamator district in the Indian state of Nagaland.

Shamator was declared district headquarter of newly formed district by Chief Minister Neiphiu Rio after understanding between Tikhir Tribal Council and Yimkhiung Tribal Council. Earlier the town was part of Shamator circle of Tuensang District.

== Demographics ==
The town mostly inhabited by Yimkhiung Naga and Tikhir Naga tribes.
