= Shamator district =

- District of Nagaland
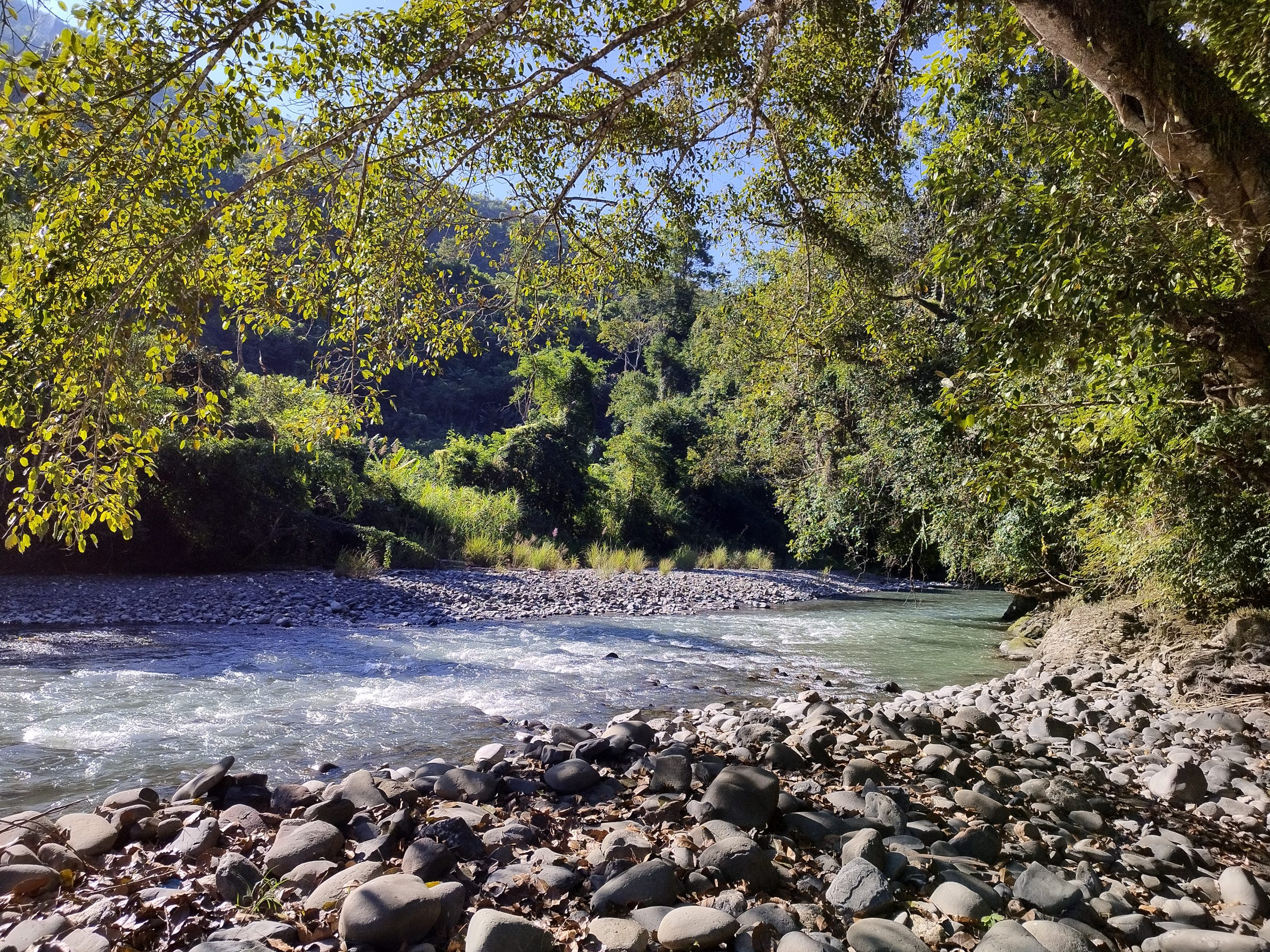
- Zungki River
- Nickname: Brotherhood District
- Shamator District in Nagaland
- Coordinates: 26.1°N 94.9°E
- Country: India
- State: Nagaland
- Headquarters: Shamator

Government
  - Lok Sabha Constituency: Nagaland
  - MP: Tokheho Yepthomi, NDPP
  - Deputy Commissioner: Y. Chingyak Konyak, NCS
  - Assembly constituencies: 1 constituencies

Population (2011)
  - Total: 34,223
- Time zone: UTC+05:30 (IST)
- Major highways: NH 202
- Website: shamator.nic.in

Shamator district is the 16th district of the Indian state of Nagaland. It was created on 19 January 2022 and was officially inaugurated on 4 March 2022. The district headquarter is located in the town of Shamator.

== History ==
Shamator District was created on 19 January 2022 as the 16th district of Nagaland. The new district has the same boundaries as the former Shamator sub-division of Tuensang District, Chessore Sub-division including Mangko EAC Circle, Administrative area of Sotokur EAC Circle excluding Chingmelen, Helipong and Sipongsang villages, Tsurungto EAC Circle under Shamator sub-division, including Hutanger, Anatongre, Pungrungru, Nutsu, Maihpok and Tsuthu, under Kiphire district, which stand transferred to Tsurungto EAC circle.

== Demographics ==
According to the 2011 census of India Shamator District had a population of 34,223 and has a sex ratio of 984 females per 1000 males and a literacy rate of 52.83%. Scheduled Tribes make up 99.03% of the population. The majority of the inhabitants are the Yimkhiung Nagas and Tikhir Nagas.

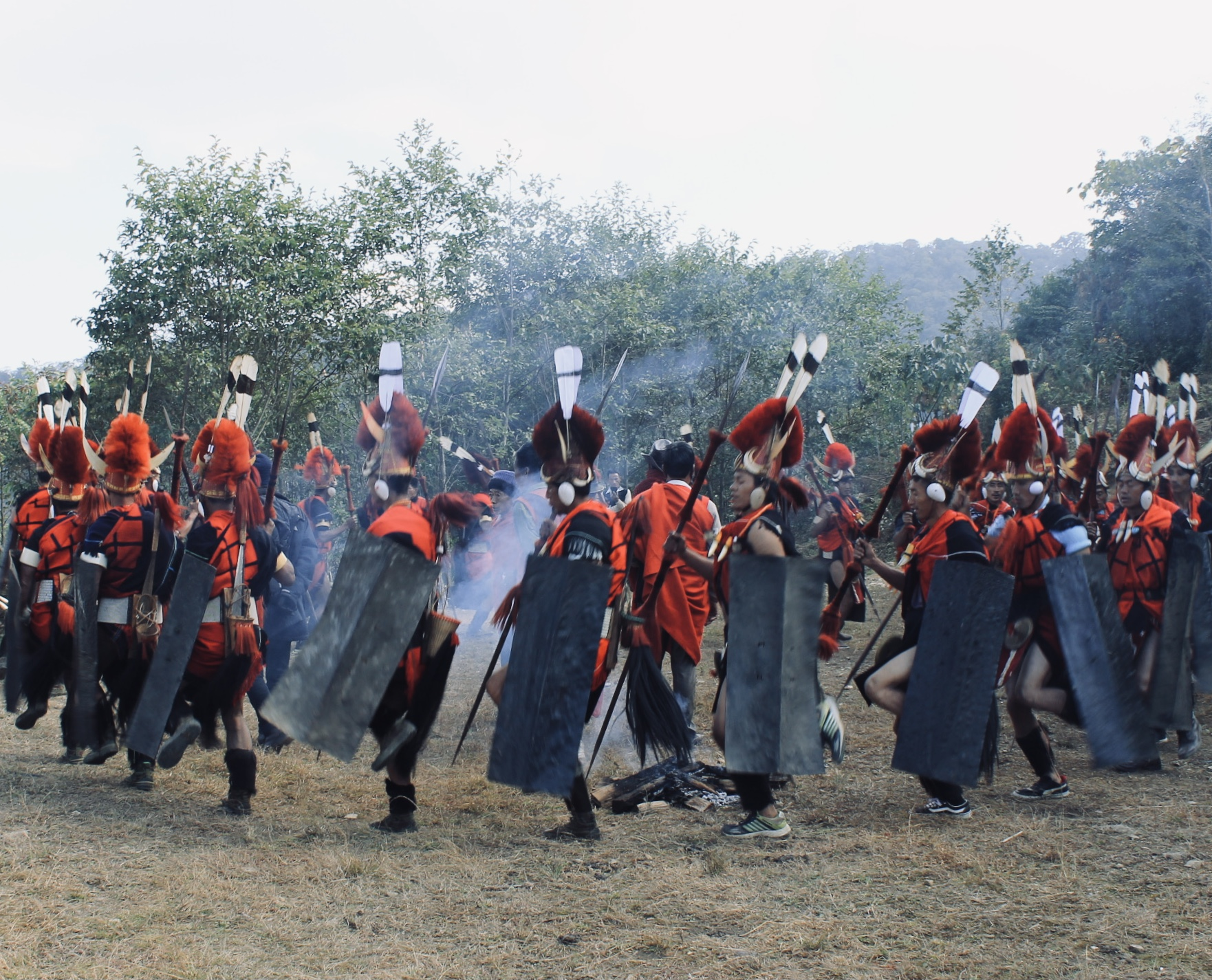
Yimkhiung Naga Cultural Troupe

== Towns and villages ==
- Chassir (601), Lasikiur (242), Liangkonger (785), Muleangkiur (887), Sangphur (2,314), Shamator Hq (4,257), Shamator Village (1,159), Waphur (996), Yakor (1,078).

== Religion ==
Religions in Shamator district (2011)
Religion	Percent
Christianity	98.88%
Islam	0.65%
Other or not stated	0.47%
Distribution of religions

Christianity is the major religion here, with 98.88% of the population.

== Language ==
At the time of the 2011 census, 90.44% of the population spoke Yimkhiungrü and 7.85% Tikhir as their first language.

== Transportation ==
=== Road ===
The NH 202 passes through the district.

== See also ==
- Nagaland
