= Christianity in Nagaland =

Christianity is the majority religion in Nagaland state of India. Along with Meghalaya and Mizoram, Nagaland is one of the three Christian-majority states in the country. According to the 2011 census, the state's population was 1,978,502, out of which 87.93% are Christians.

Religion in Nagaland (2011)
| Religion | Percent |
| Christians | 87.9% |
| Hindus | 8.7% |
| Muslims | 2.5% |
| Buddhists | 0.3% |
| Others* | 0.6% |
Distribution of religions *Includes Jains, Sikhs, Animists.

== History ==
Christianity was introduced in the erstwhile Naga Hills to expand colonialism as well driven by missionary fervour which failed to garner numbers in the Brahmaputra Valley. Prior to Christianity, the various Naga religions had dynamic and autonomous fluid beliefs. The Nagas gradually substituted older religious structures and beliefs with Christianity. As the new religion started making inroads in the Naga Hills, British administrators-turned-anthropologists started criticising the missionaries for destroying distinctive Indigenous cultures. In the early 20th century, the former began to place restrictions on missionaries activities by framing rules, imposing penalties, and increasing house tax on missionaries and new converts.

=== British colonial era ===
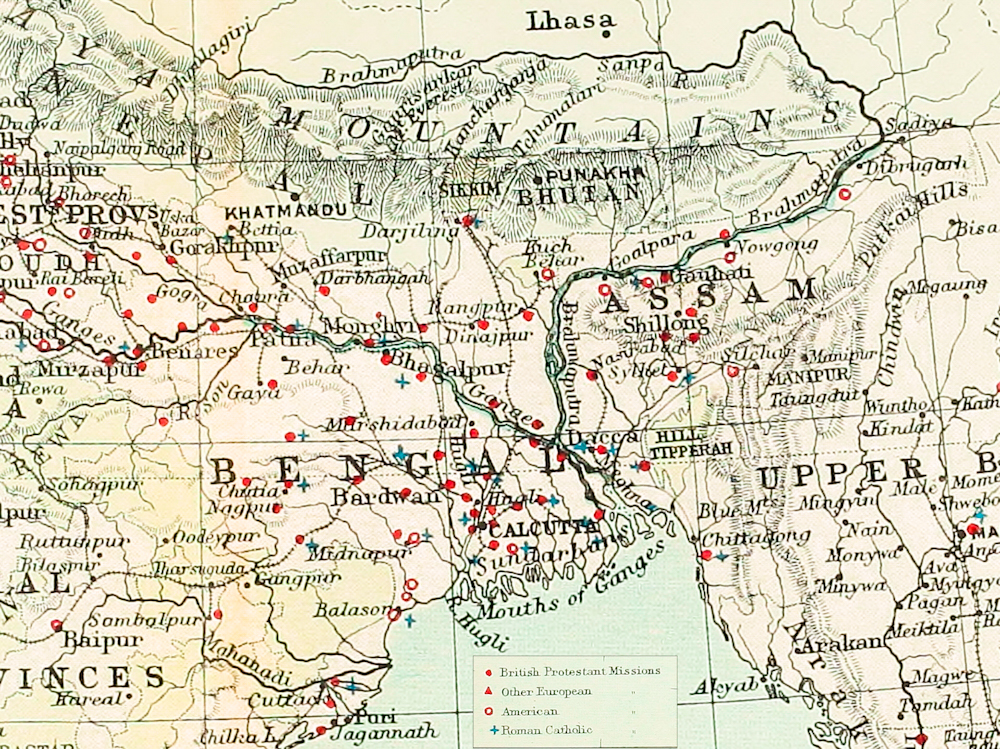
Christian Mission Stations of the Indian Empire, 1893.

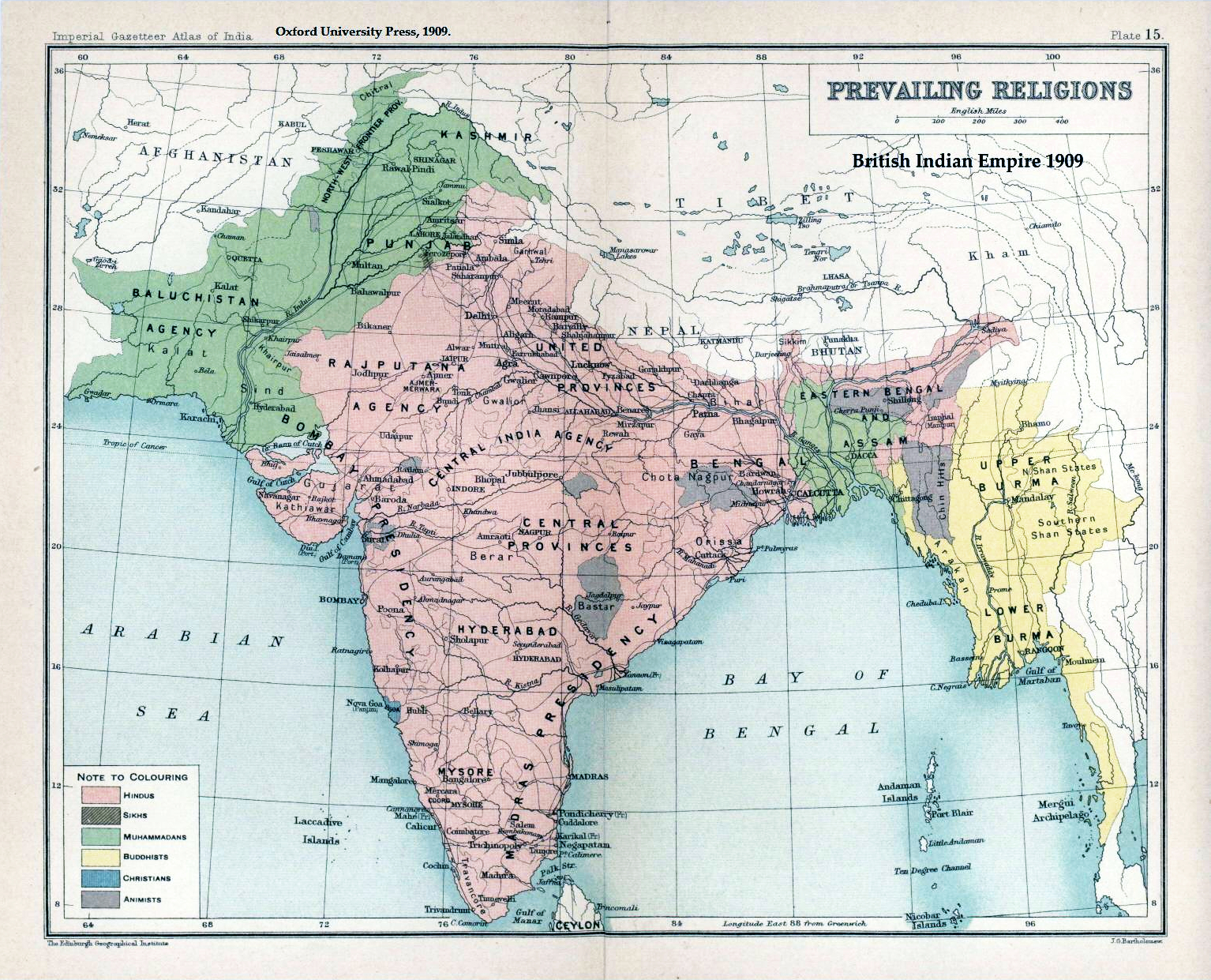
1901 Census map showing prevailing religion of British India — Garo, Khasi, Naga and Lushai hills as Animists region in the Northeast.

The earliest Christian missionaries in the erstwhile Naga Hills (part of colonial Assam province) belonged to the American Baptist Mission. They received active support of British colonial officers. In the 1830s, Francis Jenkins, then Commissioner of Assam, first invited missionaries to colonial Assam. In the 1870s, other colonial military officers such as John Butler and James Johnstone also extended the invitation to missionaries for the Naga Hills. The primary purpose of these military invitations, with assurance of state security, was to 'pacify' these Indigenous communities and subjugate them to colonial rule.

While the American Baptist Foreign Mission Society were one of the first Christian missionaries to enter the northeast frontier of Colonial India, their initial projects were frustrating. Starting the proselytising mission from Assam, the society's annual report in 1858 noted their 'great failure' to convert a sizeable population to Christianity after almost 23 years. Without explaining the reasons for the poor missionary performance, the report urged to 'cast their gaze elsewhere.' On the other hand, British efforts to subjugate the Nagas faced persistent and stiff resistance. Amongst these were the Battle of Kikrüma, Battle of Khonoma, and other skirmishes which resulted in death of several British officers.

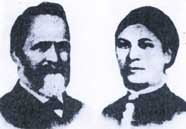
Edwin W. Clark and Mary Clark

In October 1871 Supongmeren from Molungkimong village was baptised at Sibsagar and enrolled as an American Baptist Church member. He became the bridge between the American Baptist Missionary E. W. Clark, Evangelist Godhula and the then-animist Ao Nagas. Kosasanger Council of Molungkimong Village (Dekahaimong) dispatched 60 warriors to escort Dr. E. W. Clark. It took almost three days from Sibsagar to reach Molungkimong. Clark arrived on Wednesday, 18 December and baptized 15 new converts on Sunday, 22 December 1872 at a village drinking well called Chungli Tzübu which was permitted by the Village Council. Another miracle for Clark after which they had a worship service and celebrated the first Lord's supper. Thus, on this day, the first Naga Church was founded with 28 Baptized members. They were Clark, Godhula and his wife, Supongmeren, 9 converts baptized on 10 November at Sibsagar, and 15 converts baptized at Molungkimong on 22 December 1872. Godhula went on to publish Naga Hymns in 1879 replete with piano scores.

Clark took residence in the Naga Hills in March 1876. In the following years, the American Baptist missionaries began their work with among other tribes with the help of the colonial state. In 1880 Rev. Charles Daniel King started a mission field in Kohima after the British defeated the Angami Naga rebellions and established their headquarters in Kohima. Similarly, after the British occupied Wokha in 1878, and placed a sub-divisional officer and military force there, missionary activities began in the Lotha Naga areas. In 1885, with the support of Clark and deputy commissioner of the Naga Hills, Rev. William Ellsworth Witter started the mission station in Wokha.

Christianity in the Naga Hills disrupted local work culture and ethics when it imposed Sabbath observance restricting new converts from working on Sundays. In turn, new converts were fined for refraining from communal labour. The 1886 Assam Mission Jubilee Conference organised by the American Baptist Missionary Union allowing for biblical restrain instead of rigid legalism over Naga participation in Sunday markets organised by the tea plantation owners and in communal labour.

=== Postcolonial era ===
Nagaland was one of several regions of Northeast India that experienced Christian revival movements in the 1950s and 1960s. The "Nagaland Christian Revival Church", formed in 1962, grew out of the initial phase of this movement. It had its origin in Gariphema Village of Kohima District where, in 1962, an event known as "The Great Awakening" started.

The revival emphasised believers having a "personal encounter with Christ", the witnessing of "signs and wonders" (such as miraculous healings), and having a missionary outreach to non-believing or nominally-Christian Nagas. The result was that Nagaland became an overwhelmingly Christian state, known as "the only predominantly Baptist state in the world." Among Christians, Baptists are the predominant group, constituting more than 75% of the state's population, thus making it more Baptist (on a percentage basis) than Mississippi in the southern United States, where 55% of the population is Baptist. Catholics, Revivalists, and Pentecostals are the other Christian denomination numbers. Catholics are found in significant numbers in parts of Wokha District and Kohima District as well as in the urban areas of Kohima, Chümoukedima and Dimapur.

According to certain anthropologists like Vibha Joshi, it is true that the widespread conversion of the Naga peoples to Christianity from animism occurred over the courses of two to three generations. Missionary evangelization, biomedical healing, and the indigenous understandings of well-being contributed to the growth of Christianity in the region.

The Naga National Council had a popular plebiscite in 1951, culminated to the 1956 Constitution whose preamble affirmed the sovereignty of God the Almighty in all the universe and the entrustment of the nation to Him who never ended to sustain the descendants of the forefathers. Religious relationships with India have also a specific discipline in the Article 371(A) of the Indian Constitution that come into force in 1963 and reserves to the Legislative Assembly of Nagaland the right to approve by resolution any Act of the Indian Parliament in respect of "religious or social practices of the Nagas".

== Statistics ==
Historical Christian Population in Nagaland
| Year | Pop. | ±% |
|---|---|---|
| 1901 | 601 | — |
| 1911 | 3,308 | +450.4% |
| 1921 | 8,734 | +164.0% |
| 1931 | 22,908 | +162.3% |
| 1941^{#} | 34,000 | +48.4% |
| 1951 | 98,068 | +188.4% |
| 1961 | 195,588 | +99.4% |
| 1971 | 344,798 | +76.3% |
| 1981 | 621,590 | +80.3% |
| 1991 | 1,057,940 | +70.2% |
| 2001 | 1,790,349 | +69.2% |
| 2011 | 1,739,651 | −2.8% |
^{*} Pre-independence figure only for erstwhile Naga Hills district areas. Tuensang region incorporated into Nagaland in 1957 for which data unavailable.^{#} Estimated; Source: Census of India – data extracted by Centre for Policy Studies, India

The 2011 census recorded the state's Christian population at 1,739,651, making it, with Meghalaya, Arunachal Pradesh, and Mizoram as the four Christian-majority states in India. The state has a very high church attendance rate in both urban and rural areas. The majority of churches are found in Kohima, Chümoukedima, Dimapur and Mokokchung.

Adherents of Christianity by social groups
1. Scheduled Tribes (96.6%)
2. Non-ST population (3.40%)

The state comprises 96.6% of Scheduled Tribes population, who are the adherent of Christianity.

Christianity among Scheduled Tribes
| Scheduled Tribes | Adherents of Christianity | Percentage of Tribes practices Christianity | Percentage of Christian among Tribal Christians |
|---|---|---|---|
| Garo | 1,834 | 78.18 | 0.11 |
| Kachari | 3,938 | 30.21 | 0.23 |
| Kuki | 18,514 | 98.65 | 1.1 |
| Mikir | 132 | 60.55 | 0.01 |
| Naga — | 1,647,480 | 98.79 | 98.04 |
| — Angami | 139,781 | 98.62 | 8.32 |
| — Ao | 224,525 | 99.07 | 13.36 |
| — Chakhesang | 153,740 | 99.27 | 9.15 |
| — Chang | 63,603 | 99.03 | 3.78 |
| — Chirr | 138 | 100 | 0.01 |
| — Khiemnungan | 61,246 | 99.35 | 3.64 |
| — Konyak | 232,619 | 97.92 | 13.84 |
| — Lotha | 171,771 | 99.23 | 10.22 |
| — Makware | 9 | 90 | 0 |
| — Phom | 52,255 | 99.19 | 3.11 |
| — Rengma | 62,285 | 98.94 | 3.71 |
| — Sangtam | 74,439 | 99.26 | 4.43 |
| — Sema | 234,762 | 99.34 | 13.97 |
| — Tikhir | 7,468 | 99.08 | 0.44 |
| — Yimchaungre | 66,514 | 99.32 | 3.96 |
| — Zeliang | 71,305 | 95.23 | 4.24 |
| — Pochury | 21,704 | 98.89 | 1.29 |
| — Viswerna | 3,536 | 96.51 | 0.21 |
| — Any other Naga | 5,780 | 98.92 | 0.34 |
| Generic Tribes etc. | 8,526 | 95.85 | 0.51 |
| All Schedule Tribes | 1,680,424 | 98.21 | 100 |

=== Trends ===
Religious trends of Nagaland

Decadal growth of religious groups.

Decadal changes in the religious composition.

Percentage of Christians in Nagaland by decades

| Year | Percent | Increase |
|---|---|---|
| 1901 | 0.59% | - |
| 1911 | 2.22% | +1.63% |
| 1921 | 5.5% | +3.28% |
| 1931 | 12.81% | +7.31% |
| 1941 | 0% | -12.81% |
| 1951 | 46.05% | +46.05% |
| 1961 | 52.98% | +6.93% |
| 1971 | 66.76% | +13.78% |
| 1981 | 80.21% | +13.45% |
| 1991 | 87.47% | +7.26% |
| 2001 | 89.97% | +2.5% |
| 2011 | 87.93% | -2.04% |

== In popular culture ==
Talilula's graphic novel 1872 with illustrations by Tetsong Jamir traces the advent of Christianity in the state.

== See also ==
- Religion in Nagaland
- Nagaland Baptist Church Council
- Christianity in India
- List of Christian denominations in North East India

== Bibliography ==
- Thomas, John (2016). Evangelising the Nation: Religion and the formation of Naga political identity. Routledge. ISBN 978-1138639928.
