= Divanee Magazine =

Divanee Magazine was an online magazine founded in 2003 by Miral Sattar with the aim of bringing about a magazine in which issues and concerns unique to women of the South Asian diaspora could be addressed. The word, divanee, means crazy or passionate in Hindi. The first issue appeared in November 2003. The magazine folded in August 2010.

Concentrating on a young 16-33 audience, Divanee offered the usual combination of fashion, health, music and film reviews, but it also hoped to provide a liberal perspective to young Desi women, with an editorial stance that promotes free-thinking, pride in one's heritage and oneself, individuality and overcoming cultural expectations. It promoted South Indian involvement in higher Education and it dedicated a lot of its content to successful Desi men and women.
