= Patrick Copland (chaplain) =

Scottish Anglican minister and planter (1570–1651)

Personal details
- Born: c. 1570 Scotland
- Died: 1651 (aged 80–81) St. George's, Bermuda

Military service
- Allegiance: East India Company
- Rank: Chaplain

Patrick Copland (c. 1570 — 1651) was a Scottish Anglican minister and planter, serving for the British East India Company as a chaplain during much of the early 17th century.

He is remarked for delivering the 1622 sermon "Virginia's God be thanked," which was delivered as a means of rejoicing for the contemporary prosperity of the Virginia Colony. He is also known for his involvement in an expedition in 1613 headed for the East Indies, where he came in contact with a boy later known as Peter Pope while in Bengal, who would be among the first South Asians to set foot in the British Isles whilst undergoing Anglicisation.

== Biography ==
Patrick Copland was born around 1570 in Aberdeen, and educated at Marischal College.

In 1613, he travelled to the East Indies with the East India Company, taking part in an expedition. In 1614, he came across Peter Pope, a young Bengali boy whom he would take aboard, bringing him back to England. While in England, Pope converted to Anglicanism and received a religious education, later remarked as having been a fast learner. Accordingly, the boy ended up as a member of the clergy, becoming a translator and interpreter for Copland's sermons. He also received a baptism from King James I in 1616, three days prior to that year's Christmas.

Among Pope's translations of Copland's sermons includes "Virginia's God be thanked," which was delivered as a means of appreciation for the Colony's affluence and good fortune; its full title being the following:

Virginia's God be thanked, or A sermon of thanksgiving for the happie successe of the affayres in Virginia this last yeare. Preached by Patrick Copland at Bow-Church in Cheapside, before the Honorable Virginia Company, on Thursday, the 18. of Aprill 1622. And now published by the commandement of the said honorable Company. Hereunto are adjoyned some epistles, written first in Latine (and now Englished) in the East Indies by Peter Pope, an Indian youth, borne in the bay of Bengala, who was first taught and converted by the said P.C. And after baptized by Master Iohn Wood, Dr in Divinitie, in a famous assembly before the Right Worshipfull, the East India Company, at S. Denis in Fan-Church streete in London, December 22. 1616

Later, Copland, along with Pope, went back to Bengal in hopes of Christianizing Pope's tribe. However, they had little luck in doing so, and Copland returned to England alone four years later.

Eventually, Copland emigrated to the Virginia Colony, where he became an advocate for education amid widespread illiteracy and a lack of institutional support; he worked towards establishing a college in Virginia, although he faced opposition from influential figures and the general populace. Nonetheless, his efforts contributed to the founding of the College of William and Mary in 1693.

After the Virginia Company’s charter was revoked, Copland moved to Bermuda, promoting Christian civilization, as well as religious tolerance and the separation of church and state. He sought to establish a community on Eleuthera in the Bahamas, inviting Puritans to join him. However, the island's harsh conditions led many to return to Bermuda. There, his livelihood was ultimately centered around planting, dying there in 1651, while in his early eighties.
