= Longphuri Naga =

Naga tribes

Amimi, Longfur

Languages
- Long Phuri language

Related ethnic groups
- Makury Naga, Yimkhiung Naga, Other Naga people

The Longphuri people, also known as Amimi people or the Longphur Naga, are a Tibeto-Burmese ethnic group inhabiting in the Northeast Indian state of Nagaland, and the Naga Self-Administered Zone in Myanmar. In India, they are listed as a subgroup of the ethnic Yimkhiung Naga. In Myanmar, the Longphuri are a recognized tribe.

The Longphuri language shares 30-37% lexical similarity with Makury and 24% with Para (Jejara). Longphuri and Makury are subgroups of the Yimchiung tribe in Nagaland, India. The Makury are also a tribe in Myanmar.

== Bibliography ==
- Tohring, S. R. (2010). Violence and identity in North-east India: Naga-Kuki conflict. Mittal Publications. ISBN 978-81-8324-344-5.
- Lubbe, Melissa; Priest, Tiffany; Lew, Sigrid (2022). "A Preliminary Phonology and Latin-based Orthography of Para Naga (Jejara), Northwest Myanmar". Southeast Asian Linguistics Society. 15 (2). ISSN 1836-6821.
