= Peter Pope (translator) =

Indian Anglican translator and missionary (born 1600)

- Born: c. 1600; Bengal Subah, Mughal Empire
- Occupations: Translator; interpreter; missionary
- Known for: The first confirmed Indian to visit England; the first Christian convert resulting from English evangelical efforts
- Notable work: Virginia's God be thanked (translation)

Peter Pope (born c. 1600), also known in Latin as Petrus Papa, was an Indian Anglican translator, interpreter, and missionary, known for being the first South Asian to visit England, in addition to being the first Christianised one; he was also the first to publish any works in England.

== Biography ==
Born in Bengal around 1600, then a part of the Mughal Empire, he traveled with the East India Company chaplain Patrick Copland to London in 1614, where he received a religious education.

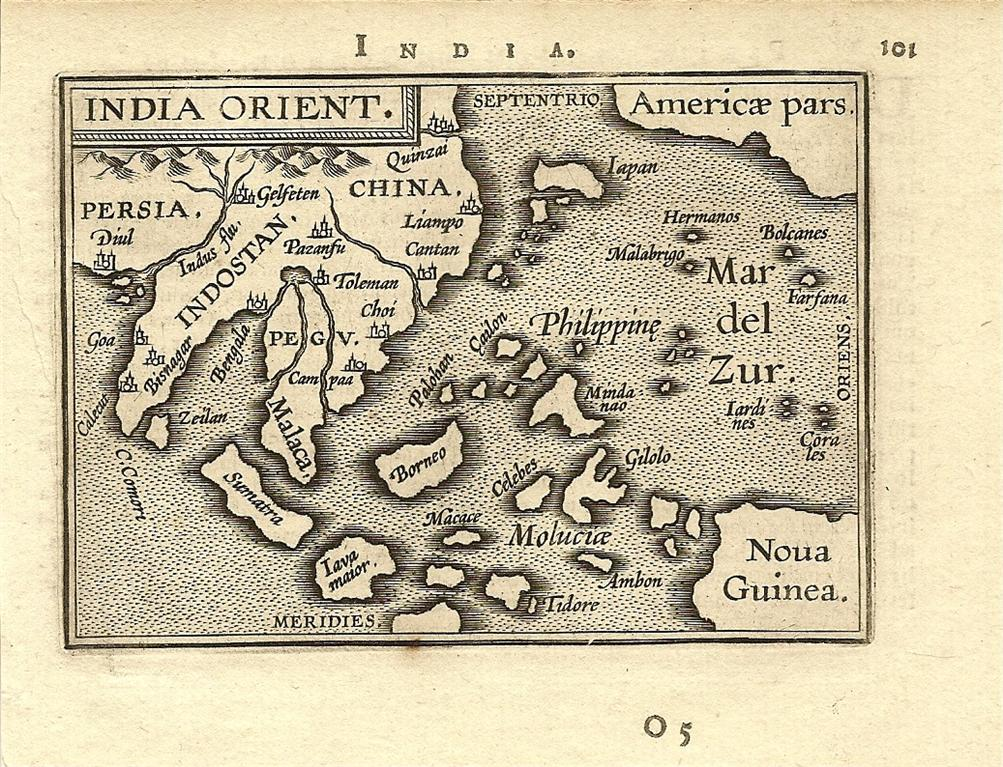
Contemporary map of Southern Asia & surrounding areas—approximately at the time of Pope's birth

He reportedly picked up English and Latin considerably quickly, becoming an interpreter and translator shortly thereafter. On one occasion, he published and sold his translation of Patrick Copland's sermon delivered in Cheapside, titled "Virginia's God be Thanked"; this is speculated to be the first work "by an Indian to be published in England."

On 22 December 1616, he was baptized by King James I—who had decided on naming him Peter Pope—prior to subsequently remigrating to his homeland. Despite his efforts, accompanied by those of Copland, to bring his tribe to the faith, they were said to have been relatively dismissive of it. Copland returned to England alone four years later.
