= Afghan Turkmens =

Turkmen diaspora living mostly in the north-west of Afghanistan

Turkmens of Afghanistan
افغان توٚرکمنلری
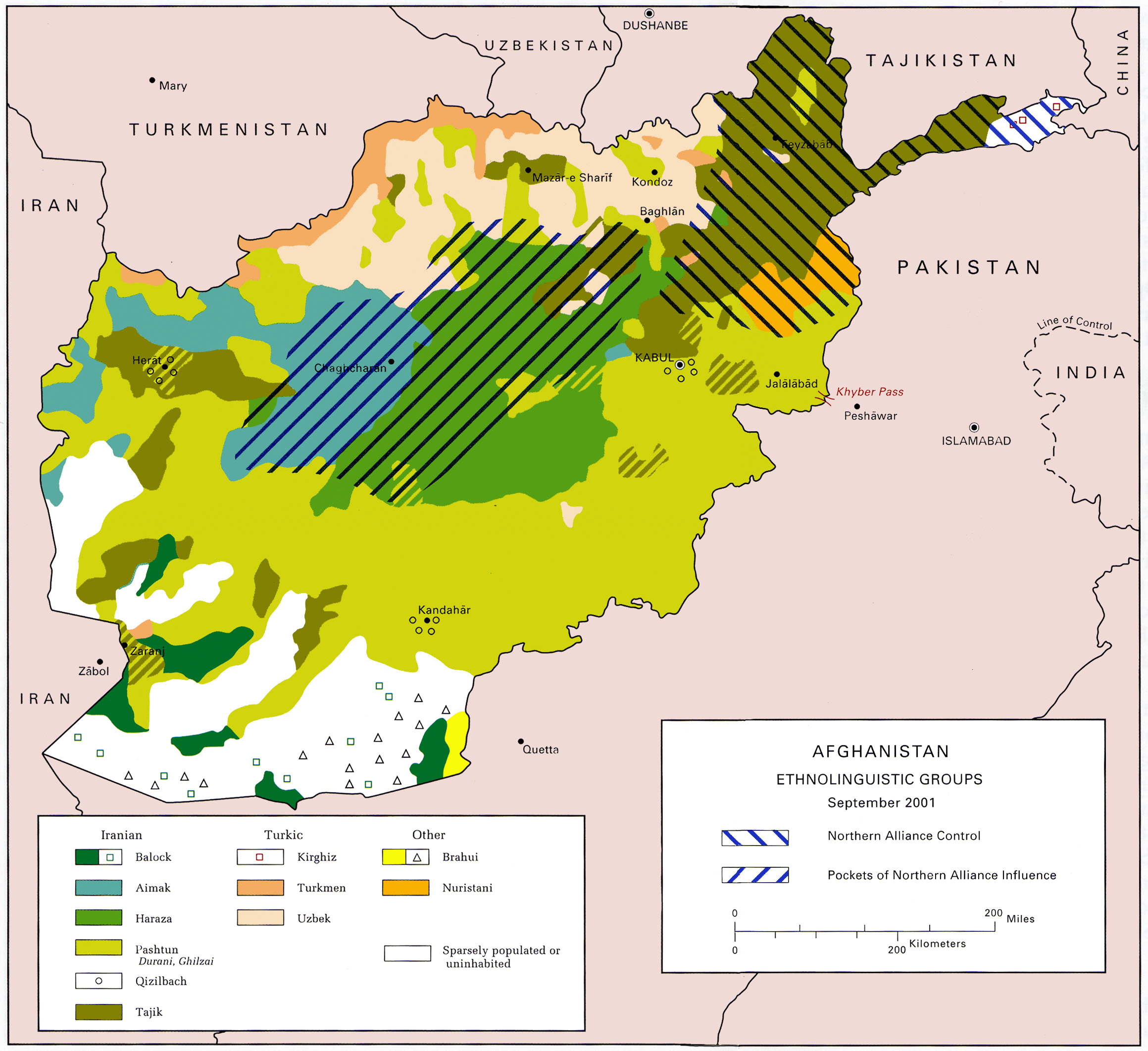

Total population
- c. 1 million

Regions with significant populations
- Afghan Turkestan: (Badgis; Balkh; Faryab; Herat; Jowzjan)

Languages
- Turkmen; Dari Persian

Religion
- Predominantly: Sunni Islam

Afghan Turkmens or Turkmens of Afghanistan (Persian: ترکمن‌های افغانستان; Turkmen: افغان توٚرکمنلری afghan türkmenleri, [oʊˈɢɑn tʏɾkmønˈløɾʏ]) are Turkmen people who live in the north-west of Afghanistan along the border with Uzbekistan and Turkmenistan, surrounded by a larger group of Afghan Uzbeks. The number of Turkmens in Afghanistan is estimated at 1 million people or roughly 2-3% of the population of Afghanistan.

== History ==
Turkmens were one of the divided peoples in Central Asia nearing the end of the 19th century as a result of British, Iranian, and Afghan counteraction, as well as the halt of the Russian expansion into Turkistan and Transoxiana.

The original Turkmen groups arrived from the east of the Caspian Sea into northwestern Afghanistan at various periods, particularly after the end of the 19th century when the Russians moved into their territory. They established settlements from Balkh Province to Herat Province, where they are now concentrated; smaller groups settled in Kunduz Province. Others came in considerable numbers as a result of the failure of the Basmachi revolts against the Bolsheviks in the 1920s.

Though the majority of Turkmens are recent immigrants who crossed the Soviet border in the years between 1915 and 1940, the chronicles of the 18th and even 17th centuries show that large groups of Turkmens were already present in Afghan Turkestan.

Turkmen tribes, of which there are twelve major groups in Afghanistan, base their structure on genealogies traced through the male line. Consequently, senior male members of the family wield considerable authority. The following major Turkmen tribes live in Afghanistan: Ersari, Teke, Alili, Saryks, and Salyrs. More than half of the Afghan Turkmens are descendants of the refugees who escaped collectivization in Soviet Turkmenistan in the late 1920s and early 1930s.

== Culture ==
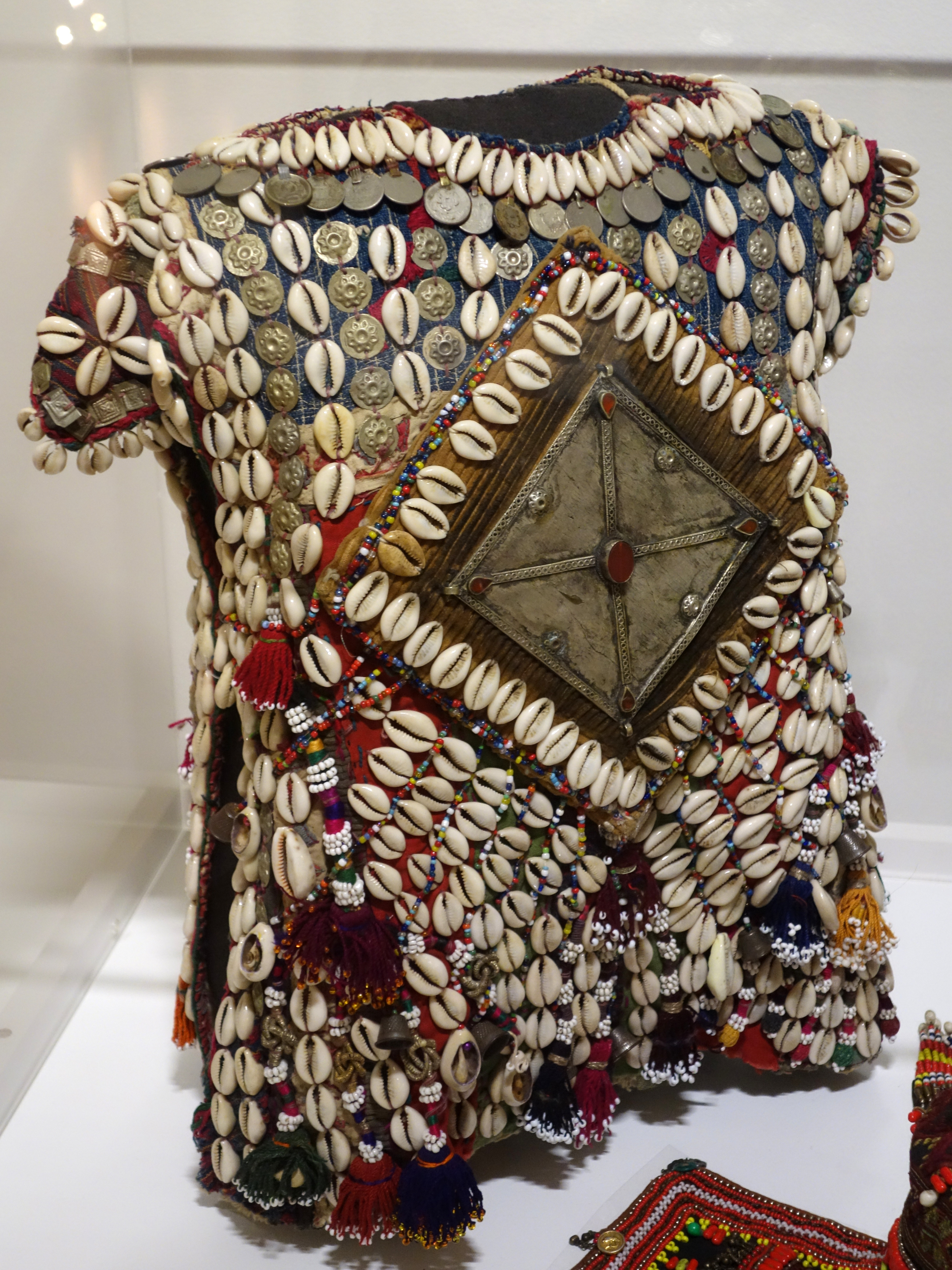
Turkmen child's tunic, Northern Afghanistan, early to mid 20th century

=== Occupation ===
Formerly a nomadic and fierce warriors feared for their lightning raids on caravans, Turkmens in Afghanistan today are farmer-herdsmen and important contributors to the economy. They introduced karakul sheep to Afghanistan and are also renowned makers of carpets, which, with karakul pelts, are major hard currency export commodities. Turkmen jewelry is also highly prized.

Mostly, Afghan Turkmens are economically well established in the country largely due to significant importance to the Afghan economy of the carpets.

=== Language ===
Afghan Turkmens mostly speak the Ersari dialect of the Turkmen language, which itself is a Turkic language of the Oghuz group. It has an estimated five million native speakers in Turkmenistan, and a further 719,000 speakers in Northeastern Iran.

The Turkmen language is closely related to Azerbaijani and Turkish languages, sharing common linguistic features and enjoying a high degree of mutual intelligibility with each of these languages.

=== Religion ===
The Turkmens of Afghanistan just as their kin in Turkmenistan, Uzbekistan, and Iran are predominantly Sunni Muslims.

Turkmens adopted Islam between the 12th and 14th centuries. Sufi orders like the Yasawiya and Kubrawiya greatly contributed to the conversion of the Turkmens to Islam.

The great majority of Turkmens readily identify themselves as Muslims and acknowledge Islam as an integral part of their cultural heritage.

== Notable people ==
- Jamahir Anwari, politician
- Eypio- Afghan-born Turkish rapper, songwriter and musician.
- Noor Mohammad Qarqin, politician

== See also ==
- Ethnic groups in Afghanistan
- Turkic people in Afghanistan
- Turkoman horse
- Iranian Turkmens
- Turkoman (ethnonym)
- Oghuz Turks
- Afghan Turkestan
