= Puducherry diaspora =

The Puducherry diaspora is a demographic group of people from Puducherry union territory of India who have emigrated and settled in other parts of the world, significantly in France, Réunion and the French Caribbean islands of Martinique and Guadeloupe. There are around 300,000 of them living around the world.

== Background ==
Many left to work in the possessions of the French Empire via its holdings in Puducherry district in Réunion and the French Caribbean islands of Martinique and Guadeloupe (See Malabars). Although most of the indentured labourers embarked on their journey from the overseas possessions of French India, they did not necessarily come from there. In fact, most of the workers were recruited in the hinterlands of the Coromandel Coast and even beyond it, such as Arcot and Chingelput for Puducherry or Tanjore and Trichinopoly for Karaikal district. The flow of recruits from Andhra was also significant, and even pioneering.

=== Réunion ===
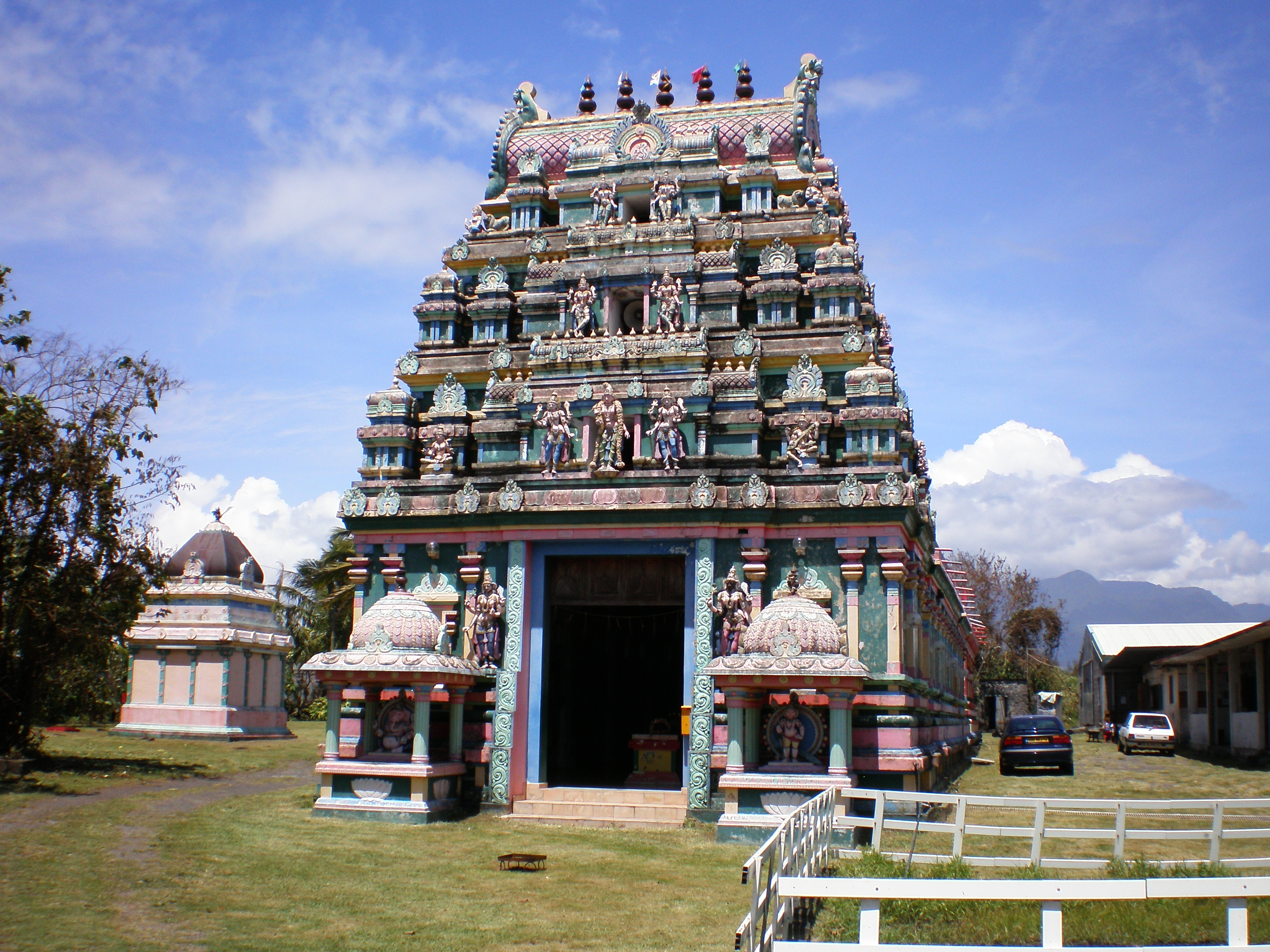
A Malbar temple in Réunion.

Tamil settlement in the French department of Réunion started as far back as 1848 as indentured labour, mainly from Puducherry district and Karaikal district, the French territories in Southern India. There are now about 120,000 Tamils living in Réunion or "Malabars" as they are known there with a large number of Hindu temples run by voluntary organisations where Hindu and Tamil cultural links are preserved well.

=== Seychelles ===
Tamil traders from Pondicherry City used to visit the Seychelles for purposes of timber trade followed by settlements of Tamils from Tamil Nadu for trading purposes. Later, a trading community was in place here mainly of Tamils and many of them got integrated with the local community. Now there about 4000 Tamils in the trading business as well as in other professions.

=== French West Indies ===
Tamil migration to the French West Indies was mainly sailings from Pondicherry City and Karaikal during the years 1853 to 1883 and since 1893 almost all of them got well integrated with the people there.

The Puducherry diaspora community in Guadeloupe is estimated to be approximately 55,000 in a population of over 400,000. However, ethnicity statistics are not done by the French government. There are several associations to promote Indian culture in Guadeloupe, usually run by people of Indian origin. They are fairly active in organising cultural activities in all the principal towns, namely, Pointe-a-Pitre, Le Moule, Port-Louis, Capesterre-Belle-Eau and Saint-Claude.

The Puducherry diaspora community in Martinique of majority are descendants of indentured labourers from India who were brought to the island in the nineteenth century. Between 5 and 10% of the population is of Tamil Indian origin.

== See also ==
- Indian diaspora
- South Indian diaspora
- Tamil Nadu diaspora
- Sri Lankan diaspora
- Sri Lankan Tamil diaspora
