= Chirr language =

Sino-Tibetan language of Nagaland, India

Chirr
- Region: Nagaland
- Ethnicity: Chirr Naga, Yimkhiung
- Native speakers: 3,400 (2011)
- Language family: Sino-Tibetan: Central Naga languages; Chirr

Language codes
- ISO 639-3: –
- Glottolog: chir1282

Chirr is a Sino-Tibetan language spoken by the Chirr Naga (Yimkhiung) community in northeast India. It is related to other Yimkhiungrü language and is sometimes considered as a dialect of the Yimkhiung Nagas.
