= Turkmen jewelry =

Type of jewelry belonging to the Turkmen people

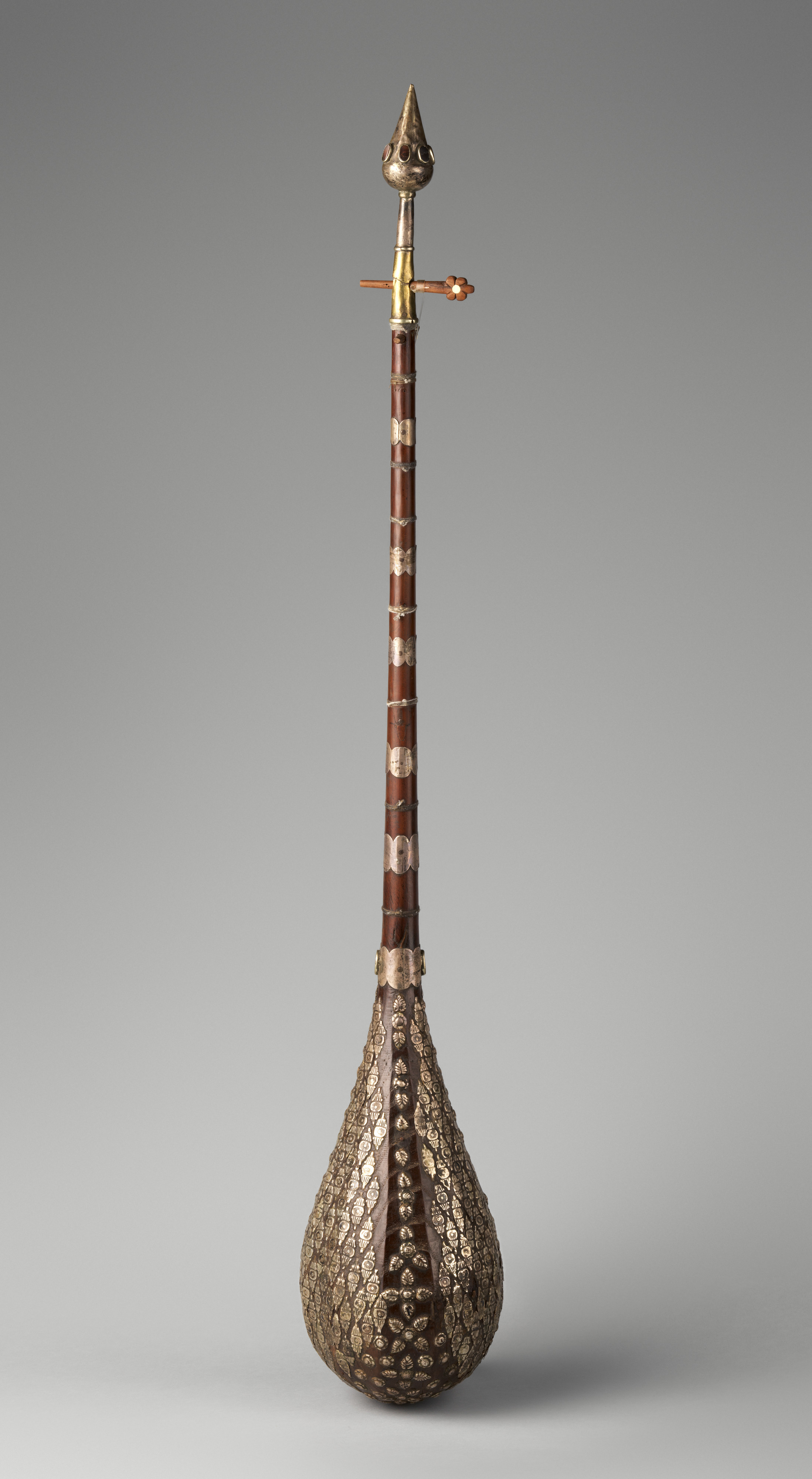
A Turkmen lute, gilded and fitted with cornelians

Turkmen jewelry is a type of jewelry originating among the various Turkmen cultures of Western and Central Asia. The jewelry was crafted both for cosmetic and spiritual reasons, and the amount of jewelry an individual adorned themselves with was equated to the person's rank in society.

== History ==
A semi-nomadic people, the various Turkmen tribes often came into contact with urban population centers in the Middle East. Turkmen jewelers benefited from these exchanges, which allowed knowledge of jewel-crafting to spread to the Turkmen. Turkmen Jewelry is not homogeneous, as major variations existed between the artisans of the different Turkmen tribes. Silver set with precious stones became the most widely produced variant of Turkmen Jewelry. Turkmen tradition holds that precious stones are beneficial to human health, and many Turkmen tribes believed jewels to possess magical powers. The subjects depicted on the jewelry varied; some pieces depicted animals and floral patterns, while others displayed images of mountains sacred to the Turkmen or geometrical patterns. Different gems were thought to have different effects on their wearers. Carnelians and silver were worn to ward off death and disease, while turquoise was worn as a symbol of purity.

Jewelry was used as a way to establish one's rank in Turkmen society. According to art historian Layla Diba, Turkmen jewelry was created for and worn by all ranks of Turkmen society, from Khans to those at "subsistence level." It was believed that, by wearing jewelry set with precious stones early in her life, a young woman could increase her fertility. After giving birth, a woman would then slowly decrease the amount of jewelry she wore as she aged. Dresses were also made with patterns designed to complement the style of the wearer's jewelry.

The industry of making Turkmen jewelry remains in place today. Due to the cost of precious metals and gemstones, some Turkmen jewelry substitutes glass beads for gems.

== Gallery ==
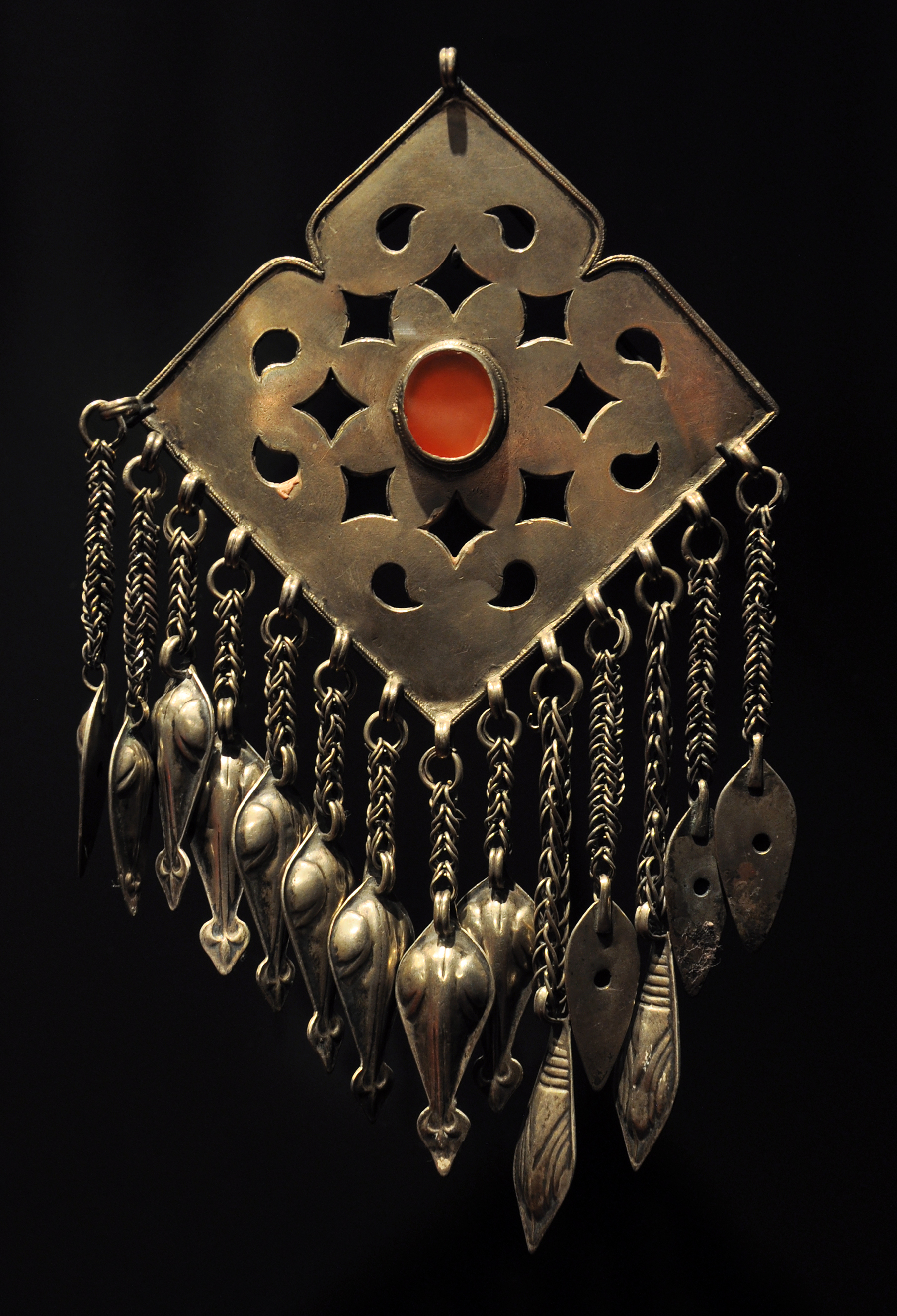
Turkmen woman's jewel, metal and cornelian.

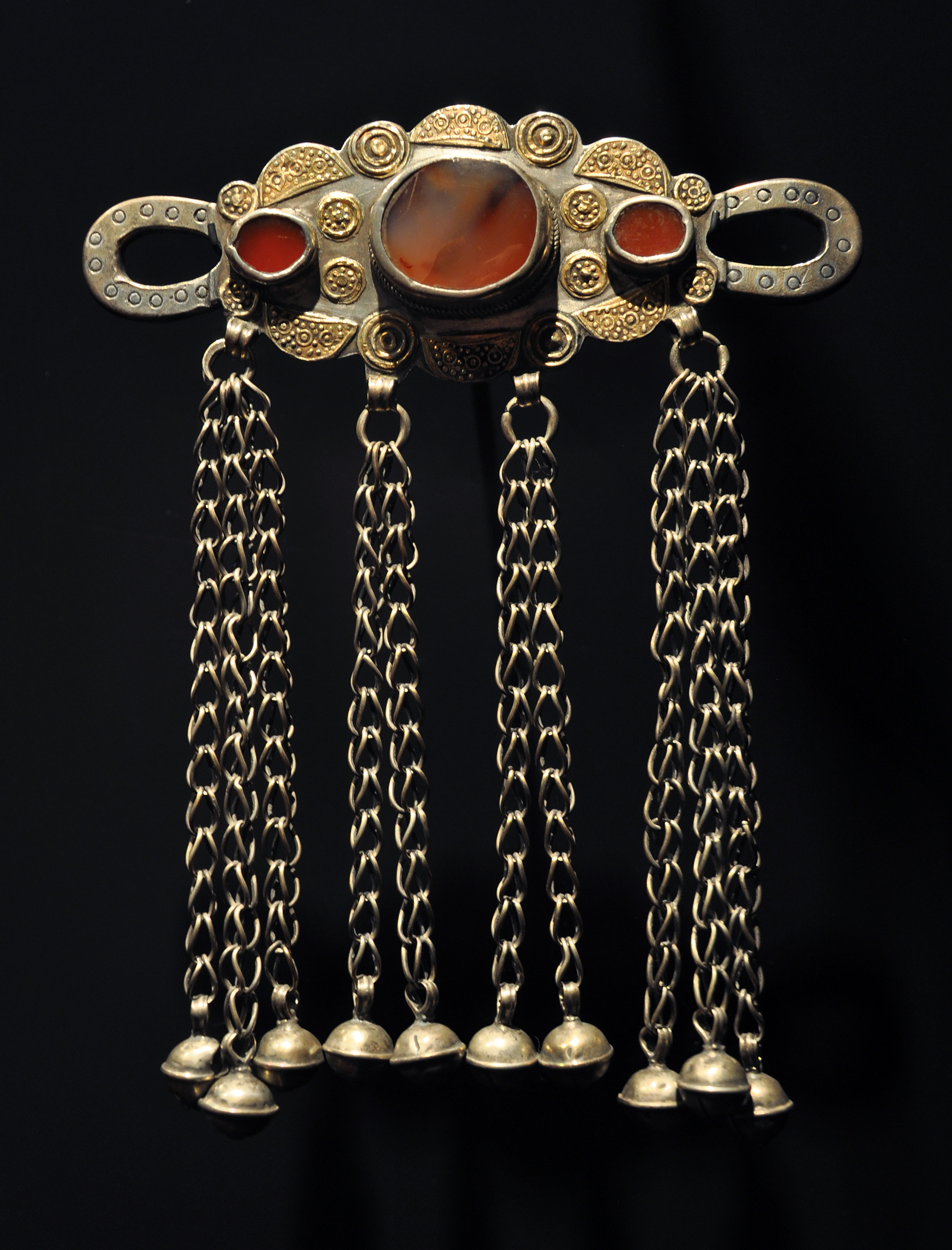
Turkmen woman's jewel, silver, gold and cornelian.
