= Turkic peoples in Afghanistan =

Turkic people of modern Afghanistan

Turkic people in Afghanistan
Regions with significant populations
- Afghan Turkestan

Languages
- Uzbek, Turkmen, Persian

Religion
- Islam

The Turkic people in Afghanistan are Turkic people from modern day Afghanistan. The major Turkic tribes are the Qizilbash, Uzbeks, Kyrgyz, and Turkmens. The Qizilbash came to Afghanistan during the Afsharid and Durrani rule in Afghanistan and since they worked at high government jobs, but also made up parts of the army, especially when Timur Shah Durrani wanted to get rid of the dependency on Pashtun tribes and expanded his army by 12.000 Qizilbash soldiers. Zaman Shah Durrani's cavalry consisted of 100.000 men, who were mostly Qizilbashs. Today they live in big cities like Kabul, Mazar-e-Sharif and Kandahar. Currently they speak mainly Persian as their language, however in some regions, as in Kandahar, they also speak Pashto. They speak the same language as their ethnic equivalents in Central Asia. In addition to that the Afghan Tatars are scattered across much of northern Afghanistan and live in isolated rural areas. Kyrgyz people settle the Wakhan Corridor of Afghanistan and are also really isolated there. The number of them was 1,130 in 2003, all from eastern Wakhan District in the Badakhshan Province of northeastern Afghanistan. They still lead a nomadic lifestyle and are led by a khan or tekin.

== See also ==
- Turkic history
- Tanoli
- Pashtun colonization of northern Afghanistan
