= Ollo Naga =

Naga tribe

Lazu

Total population
- 1510 approx, Arunachal Pradesh

Languages
- Nocte language

Related ethnic groups
- Nocte, Other Naga people

The Ollo people, also known as the Lazu Naga, are a Tibeto-Burman ethnic group that mostly resides in the Northeast Indian state of Arunachal Pradesh and some in the Naga Self-Administered Zone in Myanmar. They inhabit 12 villages under Lazu circle in Tirap district. However, due to lack of official recognition from Government of Arunachal Pradesh they are considered a subgroup of ethnic Nocte people.

== Festival ==
They celebrate "Woraang" festival. It is one of the colorful festivals of India.
