= Tikhir language =

Sino-Tibetan language of Nagaland, India

Tikhir
- Region: Nagaland
- Ethnicity: Tikhir Naga
- Native speakers: 11,000 (2011)
- Language family: Sino-Tibetan: Central Naga languages; Tikhir

Language codes
- ISO 639-3: –
- Glottolog: tikh1241

Tikhir is a Sino-Tibetan language spoken by the Tikhir Naga community in northeast India. It is related to other Yimkhiungrü language and is sometimes considered as a dialect of the Yimkhiung Nagas.
