= Yimkhiungrü language =

Sino-Tibetan language spoken in India

Yimkhiungrü
- Yachumi
- Native to: Nagaland, India
- Region: Shamator and Kiphire districts of Nagaland
- Ethnicity: Yimkhiung Naga
- Native speakers: 83,000 (2011 census)
- Language family: Sino-Tibetan: Central Naga; Yimkhiungrü

Language codes
- ISO 639-3: yim
- Glottolog: yimc1240
- ELP: Yimchungru Naga

Yimkhiungrü is a Sino-Tibetan language spoken in northeast India by the Yimkhiung Naga people. It is spoken between Namchik and Patkoi in Shamator District, Nagaland, India. Yimkhiungrü language has more than 100,000 speakers and is used in over 100 villages and towns.

== Dialects ==
Ethnologue lists the following dialects of Yimchungrü:

- Tikhir
- Makury
- Chirr
- Longpfur
- Phanungru
- Langa

== Phonology ==
Consonants
	Labial	Alveolar	Palatal	Velar	Glottal
Plosive	p b	t d	c ɟ	k	
Aspirated	pʰ	tʰ	cʰ	kʰ	
Fricative		s	ʃ		h
Nasal	m	n		ŋ	
Approximant	w	l r	j		

Vowels
	Front	Central	Back
High	i		u
Mid	e	ə	o
Low		a	

Additionally, the following diphthongs have been observed: /ie/, /ou/.
