= South Indian diaspora =

South Indian emigrants and their descendants

A map of the territories and five states in South India.

The South Indian diaspora (Tamil: அயலகத் தென்னிந்தியர்; Malayalam: തെന്നിന്ത്യൻ പ്രവാസികൾ; Kannada: ದಕ್ಷಿಣ ಭಾರತೀಯ ವಲಸೆಗಾರ; Telugu: దక్షిణ భారత వలసలు) comprises people who have emigrated from South Indian states to other Indian states and other countries, and people of South Indian descent born or residing in other Indian states and other countries.

== Tamil emigration ==
=== Early migrations (before 1800s) ===
Many Tamil emigrants who left the shores of Tamil Nadu before the 18th Century mixed with countless other ethnicities. In the medieval period, Tamilians emigrated as soldiers, traders and labourers settled in Malaysia, Singapore, Réunion, Sri Lanka, Indonesia, Myanmar and intermixed well with local population, while few communities still maintain their language and culture. Many groups still claim descent from medieval-era Tamil emigrants such as the Kaikadis of Maharashtra, Chittys of Malaysia, and the Sri Lankan Chetties, Bharatha people.

=== European Colonial period (1684–1947) ===
During this period British, Dutch, French, Portuguese and Danish colony administrators recruited a lot of local Tamilians and took them to their overseas colonies to work as laborers, petty administration officers, clerical and military duties.

In the 19th century, Madras Presidency (of which the Tamil Nadu region was a core part of) faced brutal famines. Great Famine of 1876–78. Tamil Nadu was both politically and economically weak. Britishers thus made use of hungry Tamil workers for their plantations all over the world – Malaysia, Singapore, Myanmar, Mauritius, South Africa, Fiji and also Sri Lanka (distinct from the Tamils who migrated to Sri Lanka before 18th century). Some of the Tamil groups (especially Chettiyars, Pillais, Muslims) emigrated as commercial migrants. These groups then dominated the trade and finance in Myanmar, Malaysia, Singapore, Sri Lanka, Mauritius, South Africa and other places. The first Indian to own a merchant ship during the British times comes from this group.

These Tamilians well integrated, assimilated with their adopted countries, and became part and parcel of local populations in Réunion, Mauritius, South Africa, Guyana, and Fiji. Where as Indian Tamils and Tamil Malaysians of Malaysia were evolved into distinct communities of their own with multilingual and unique sub-culture identity.

=== Modern migration (1950–present) ===
In the second half of the 20th century, around 2 million Tamils from India migrated as skilled professionals to various parts of India and countries like UAE, Qatar, Bahrain, Saudi Arabia, UK, USA, Germany, France, Singapore and so on. Some of them got citizenship of respective countries but still having strong family and cultural ties with Tamil Nadu, than those who migrated before 1950, who lost touch with their ancestral links in Tamil Nadu. In USA, more Tamilians were living and most of them are being an entrepreneurs and employees then some of them were politicians also.

== Telugu emigration ==
The Telugu Boom refers to the migration of a large number of Telugu speaking people from the Indian states of Andhra Pradesh and Telangana to the United States of America and Canada from late 80s largely consisting of the migration of students and Information Technology workers which continues to the present day.

== Malayali diaspora ==
The Malayali Diaspora refers to the Malayali people who live outside their homeland of the Indian state of Kerala and the Union Territories of Mahé, India and Lakshadweep. They are predominantly found in the Persian Gulf, North America, Europe, Australia, Caribbean, Africa and other regions around the world.
