= Makury Naga =

Total population
- Myanmar (NA), India (10), Nagaland

Languages
- Makury language

Related ethnic groups
- Yimkhiung Naga, Para Naga, Other Naga people

The Makury tribe (sometimes spelt Makuri) is one of the Naga tribes that mostly resides in Naga Self-Administered Zone in Myanmar and some in Nagaland, India. They are one of the major Naga tribes of Myanmar and mostly inhabit around Lay Shi Township in Myanmar. However, in India due to lack of official recognition from Government of Nagaland are considered sub-tribe of Yimkhiung Nagas.
