= Chirr people =

Naga ethnic group

Chirr Naga
Total population
- 12,300 Nagaland

Languages
- Chirr language

Religion
- Christianity

Related ethnic groups
- Yimkhiung, Other Naga people

The Chirr people, are a Naga ethnic group that are mostly native to Northeast Indian state of Nagaland. They are listed as a Scheduled Tribe (STs) by India. However, due to lack of official recognition from Government of Nagaland are considered sub-tribe of Yimkhiung Nagas.

== Population ==
According to the 2011 census, the population of the Chirr people in Nagaland was 12,300.
