= Tikhir people =

Naga ethnic group inhabiting in Nagaland Northeast India

Tikhir Naga
Total population
- 11,071 Nagaland

Languages
- Tikhir language

Religion
- Christianity

Related ethnic groups
- Yimkhiung, Other Naga people

The Tikhirs are a Naga ethnic group inhabiting the Northeast Indian state of Nagaland. According to the 2011 census, the population of the Tikhir people in Nagaland was 7,537. They are recognised as a Scheduled Tribe (STs) by India.

== Regional Festival ==
They celebrate Tsonglaknyi festival, which is observed from 9–12 October every year. The word 'tsonglaknyi' is made up of two words: "Tsong" means Shield and "lak" means sanctification. Tsonglaknyi is basically a festival of the sanctification of Shield. It also means sanctification of the weapons along with their wealth and valuable assets, as well as the purification of the men before going out for headhunting (earlier days). In short, it is a festival of purification. This festival is one of the most important among the Tikhir festivals celebrated, stretching for four days.
