= Yimkhiung Naga =

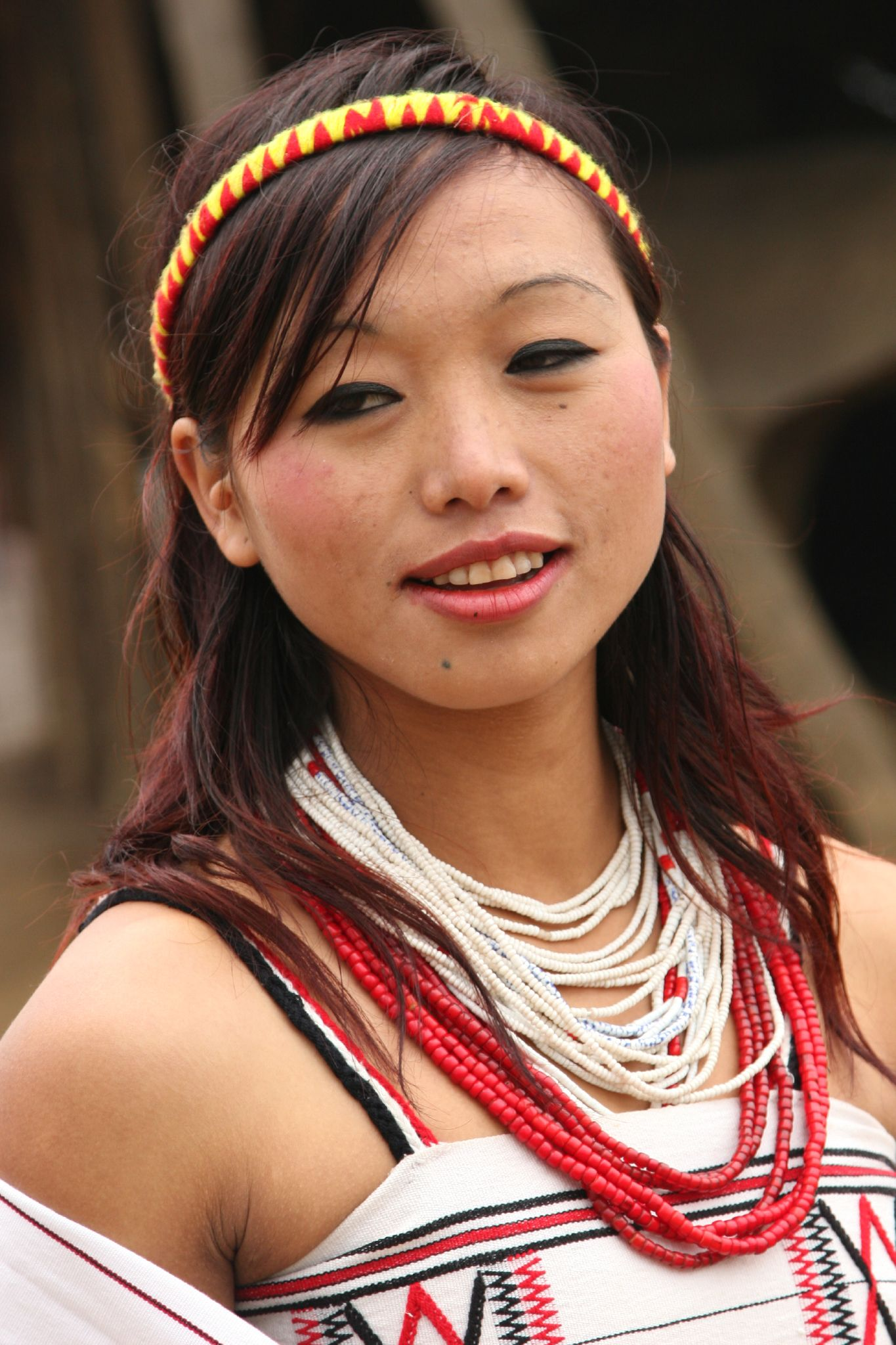
- A Yimkhiung Naga woman at the morung of Kuthur village

Regions with significant populations
- Nagaland: 74,647 (2011 census)

Languages
- Yimkhiungrü language

Related ethnic groups
- Other Naga ethnic groups

The Yimkhiungs (formerly known as Yimchunger) are a major Naga ethnic group inhabiting the territories of Shamator and Kiphire District in the Northeast Indian state of Nagaland and western areas of Myanmar.

== Etymology ==
The word Yimkhiung means "the ones who have reached their place of choice". They are also known as the Yachumi (also Yatsumi or Yachimi), which is a Sümi-influenced name. The Khiamniungans call Mongtsohai. The Chang's call Yamshong. While the Sangtam call them as Yachungre.

== History ==
According to the Yimkhiung tradition, the ethnic group emerged at a village called Moru and then came to Jure (or Chiru) village. The Yimkhiungs and the Khiamniungans are believed to have migrated to the present-day Nagaland from Upper Burma as one group, in one wave. They separated into two groups at the Moru village.

=== Migration ===
Source: Archives of Arts and Culture Department. Government of Nagaland

The Yimkhiungs, like any other Naga ethnic group has no written record of its origin or history. The people did not have any script of their own. Thus, the Yimkhiungs may have evolved from some lost ethnic groups, wandering from place to place and finally settled in present-day locations. However, on the basis of narrated historical accounts handed down from generation to generation, the origin of the Yimkhiungs is believed to be from Thailand. The present Yimkhiungs were not known by any name as an ethnic group. They lived mostly a nomadic life spending hardly one or two generation at a certain place of settlement as a village for want of more land for cultivation to meet the growing need of food and other means of sustenance. At other times, the entire population was compelled to abandon their village and shift to a safer place to avoid plague and epidemic diseases or as victims of constant head hunting amongst the neighboring villages etc.

The route of migration of the Yimkhiungs from Thailand came through Burma (Myanmar), then from Burma to Moru (in India) and from Moru to Chiru, from Chiru to Longyang to Thunyim kiulong (literally Thunyim means fifty and Kiulong means village) - thus village of fifty (within the Indian territory). Thereafter from Thunyim kiulong to Tuphung kiulong (near Bokphur village) and from Tuphung kiulong to Thsunkioso village (presently Thonoknyu village). Then from Thsunkioso to Kemiphu - on the banks of Thurak ke or popularly known as the Zungki river. Thereafter, from Kemiphu to Tukhea Khup village (below the present Wapher/Wungphung village on the banks of the Zungki river). At each place of settlements only a portion of the group set out in search of a better place with more natural resources they needed in their day today life, leaving behind the remaining population at such places as permanent citizens of that village.

While they were settled at Tukhea Khup, one day a group of these people while on fishing trip at the confluence of the Yayi river and the Zungki(Thurak ke) river, they discovered a burnt charcoal and partly burnt firewood floating down from the Yayi river. This discovery made them more curious of other human settlement towards the source of Yayi river. Accordingly, a large portion of the people set out on their expedition towards the farther upstream along the Yayi river in search of other human settlement. Finally, they arrived at a place where they found some signs of some other human activities, like clearing of jungle/forest for cultivation etc. Having now found signs of the existence of other human humans in and around this place, they named it Yimkhiungto - meaning "found it". With the passage of time this place got the name Yimkhiung or Yimchung and the residents were known as Yimkhiungrü and the village now stands as Yimchung Awun meaning Yimchung Old (popularly known as Y. Awun village till today). Prior to the establishment of this village there was no known name of the group as a community or as an ethnic group. At each place of the series of settlements not the entire population was on the move; it was only those strong and able people who dared to face any new adversary that might lay waiting as this nomads continued to move on from place to place after several years of residing at a place and even for two to three generations at certain place, in search of virgin soil to meet the needs of their ever growing population. At any place of their settlement, the duration of their settlement could be anywhere between 10 and 50 years at the most. Thus, it was at the Yimchung Awun village the settlers came to be called the Yimkhiungrüs.

The name Yimkhiungrü literally means "the finders". The residents who were left behind at several places of earlier settlements called the Yimchung Awun settlers as the Yimkhiungrus or Yimchungrus. The name Yimkhiungrü later got diluted to Yimchungers, Yachongre, Yachumi and Yamshong as they are called by the neighboring ethnic groups, more particularly the early Chang Scouts and Dobashis who accompanied the British explorers.

The Yimkhiungrüs thus settled here for a long period of time at Yimchung Awun. With the passage of time as the population exploded, a group of people started to venture out to establish a new village further North of the Yimchung Awun village at a place called 'Langa'village below the present Kuthur village. Some prominent people like Lakiumong, Zungyimkiu and Khushang from the Jangkhiunger clan. Pathong and Hemong from the Janger clan and Sangpun from the khiphur chan resided at Langa. The group of Yimkhiungrüs who were settled at Langa village were with well built physic and were fierce warriors who dared to fight with spirits and other natural elements and calamities like, floods, fire, storm etc. to test their might and endurance. However, equally brave and fierce warriors, the people started fighting for supremacy amongst them not willing to submit to each other. That being so, they could not live together in harmony and unity. Finally, they parted their ways leaving the village desolate and uninhabited as on date. The remains of Langa village still stands today bearing testimony to once inhabited by hardworking and fierce Yimkhiungrü warriors. It was from this village that the people got scattered and dispersed into almost all directions. A group of people moved towards the present Chang land, while some went to Sumi areas, Ao areas, Sangtams, Konyaks, Phoms and to Kheamniungan areas. However, a bigger portion moved downwards to establish various villages of the present Yimkhiungrü inhabited areas in addition to the residents those who chose to stay behind, stretching from the Heruppong to Mount Saramati and far beyond into the Myanmar areas, speaking different dialects like Langa, Tukhi, Mokhok, Chir, Longphur and Phunung.

As it was once upon a time those days, each village had a distinct administrative entity not subjected to any other authority and each individual village having a sovereign entity under the governance of the 'Kiulongthsuru' (meaning the founder of the village who would be regarded as the Headman aided by village elders to assist him in the village administration. Each village, big or small had equal respect as far as their rights and privileges were concerned. There was hardly any concept of community as an ethnic group beyond one's village territory. Hence, headhunting for trophy and glory ruled the land and people. But, with the advent and coming of Christianity into the Yimkhiungrü land, modern civilization and the consciousness to live united and in harmony as one people, one community dawned upon the Yimkhiungrüs.

== Culture ==
Strong ties to cultural identity in the form of their love and passion for agriculture are reflected in the hymns and beats of songs devoted to the craft.

The musical instruments of the Yimkhiungs include simple log drums, trumpets and flutes, similar to that of the Angamis.

The traditional dress of the Yimkhiungs includes colorful cane-made headgear decorated with hair and bird feathers. The Yimkhiungs both male and female have numerous traditional dresses decorated with every hue and colours. Varieties of ornaments are worn.

The Government of Nagaland has been instrumental in providing the proper tools and venues for the Yimkhiungs to properly showcase their traditions, culture, and craft with tourists. Over the last decade, an explosion of tourism in the region has catapulted attempts at preserving the culture of the relevant ethnic groups. The Yimkhiungs have been at the forefront of preserving culture in the region due to their dedicated festivals aided in part by the Naga State. The Yimkhiungs are one of the main contributors to the Hornbill Festival in the Naga State of India, the Hornbill festival showcases culture and customs from the different ethnic groupss of the Naga region. Highlights of the festival include: tribal dances across the many groups of the Naga region, spin top demonstrations by the Yimkhiung, and folk songs. Since most of the Yimkhiungs and other Naga people depend on agriculture as a main source of income: there are live harvesting demonstrations at the festival. Other demonstrations include harvest songs, cultural performances, and a very interesting traditional way of finding a bride.

=== Metümnyo ===
Metümnyo is the traditional five-day harvest festival of the Yimkhiung Naga although regarded as a solemn festival. It is celebrated after the millet crop is harvested, usually in the second week of August.

The ceremonies are inaugurated by the village elder khiungpu. The five-day festivals include:

Day	Ceremony	Description
1	Shito	Communal cleaning of the village, repair of village roads
2	Zhihdo	Repair of the paths leading to the fields, clearing up of intrusive landslides
3	Zumdo	Repair of inter-village roads
4	Khihresuk	Cleaning of water points and springs
5	Shiresuk	Cleaning and worship of agricultural tools

The Yimkhiungs pray for the souls of those who would die in the year. They invite friends home and exchange gifts. The festival is marked by engagements between the young boys and girls. The Yimkhiungs believe that males have six souls while females have five souls.

== See also ==
- Yimkhiungrü language
