= Langnyu =

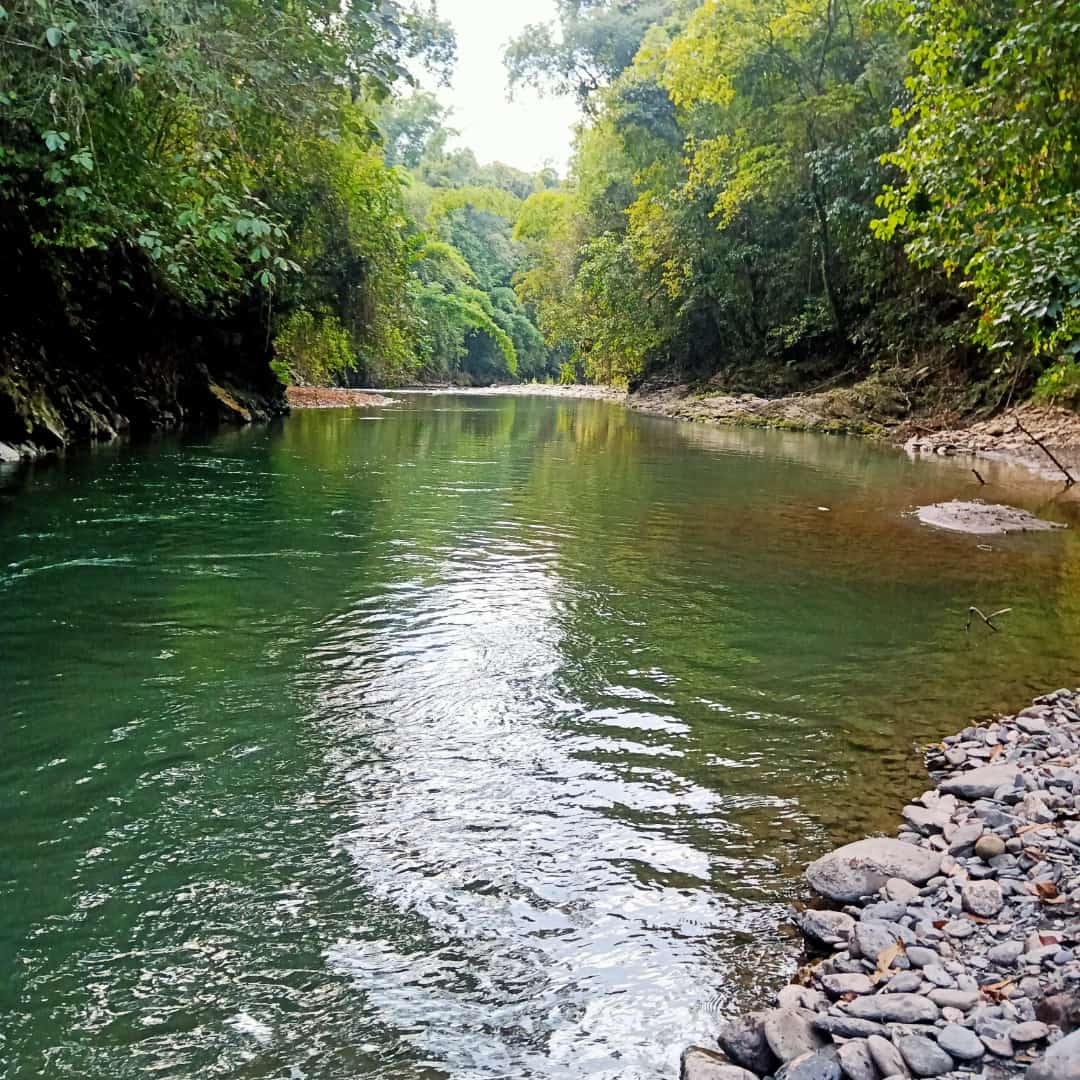
- Langnyu in Noklak, Nagaland

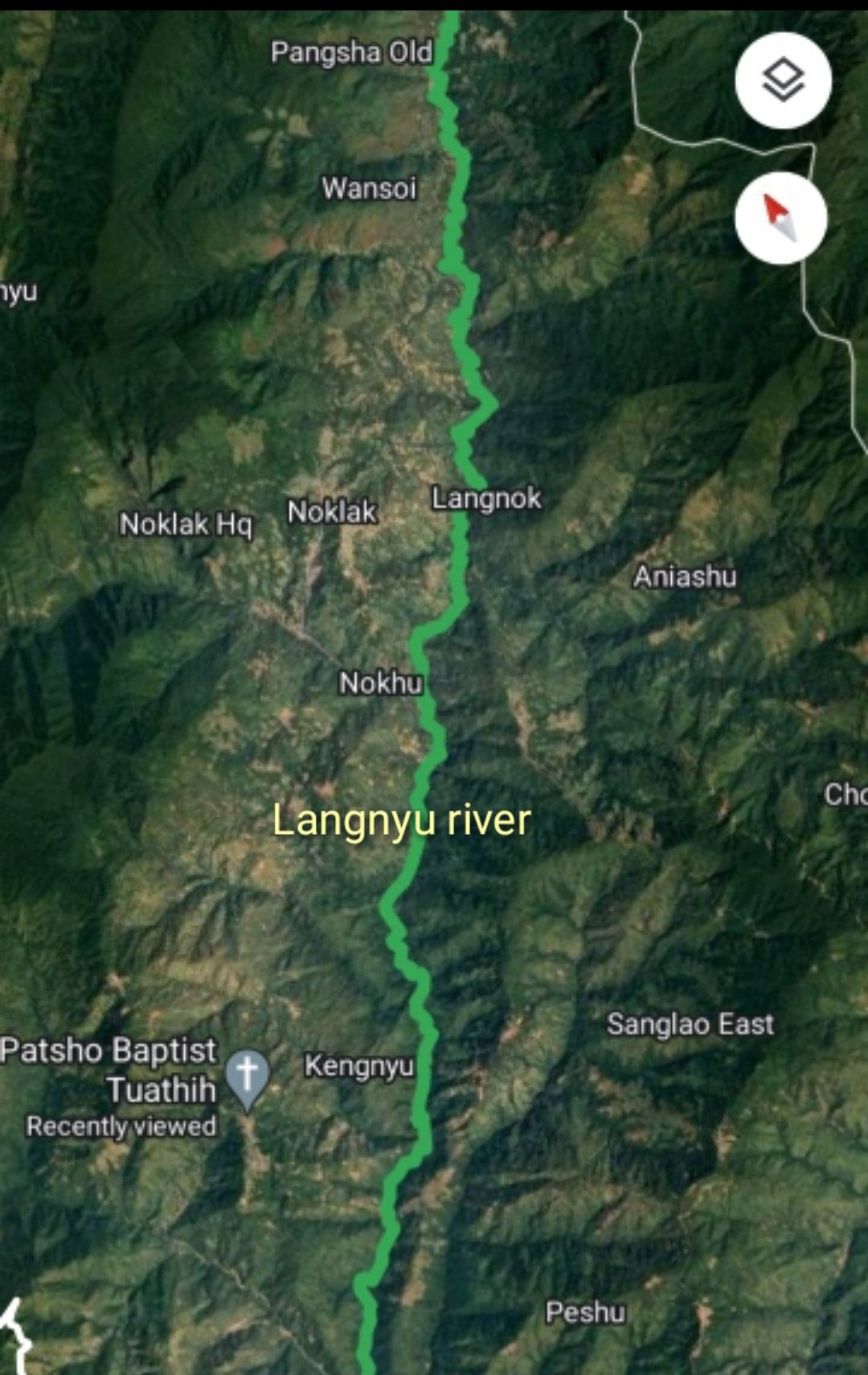

Location
- Locations: India, Nagaland, Patsho, Noklak, Peshu, Nüku, Thuonoknyu

Physical characteristics
- Source: DAN
  - coordinates: 26.289950°N 95.116285°E
  - elevation: 1,549.8 m (5,085 ft)
- 2nd source: Taknyu
  - coordinates: 26.294989°N 95.009191°E
- Mouth: Near international border - India and Myanmar
  - location: Tizu, Longmatra hq
  - coordinates: 25.782930°N 94.755671°E
  - elevation: Sea level
- Length: 150 km (93 mi)
- Width
  - maximum: 39m approx
- Depth
  - average: 2–11 m (6.6–36.1 ft)
- Discharge
  - location: Kiphire
- Discharge
  - location: East, Nagaland, Border

Basin features
- Tributaries
  - left: Joklo
  - right: Lienyu, Laklo, Lüshiumong, Tsuaheu

The Langnyu River is the biggest river in the Noklak district of the Indian state of Nagaland. The Langnyu is an important economic river, supporting agriculture and fishing. But sometimes it can be detrimental to the economy due to overflow of the river washing away paddy fields.

It is the biggest tributary of Tizu river. The source of this river originates from the north-eastern part of Changdong forest in the south of Teku and flows southerly towards Noklak, Shamator and Kiphire and finally joins Tizu river below Kiphire.

== Etymology ==
Langnyu is a compound word, i.e. Lang means dense or insurmountable, while Nyu is massive or great. Zungki is an exonym used in Noklak district although the usage is low, fuelled by lexical unfamiliarity. The other local name Laang is popular given variety of languages in the community.

== Tributaries ==
In Noklak district, the major right tributary of Langnyu is Lienyu which enters below Kingnyu Village. As the river flows southward, the Laklo river joins below Kingnyu king somewhere below Patsho Jurisdiction. This combines with the Tsuaheu river below Shamator and Wapher village. The left tributary Joklo river joins at the valley of Kingnyu king adjacent to Patsho territorial boundary. All these rivers combined runs through the heart of the region which eventually drawn into Chindwin River in Myanmar in the south. During the summer the two rivers brings sediments from the upstream that enriched the soil fertility on the bank and naturally contributes in the agricultural sector for the farmers.

== History ==
The earliest mentions of Langnyu are found in the books of J.H. Hutton, Diaries of Two Tours in the Unadministered Area East of the Naga Hills 1926, and Christoph von Furer-Haimendorf. Most of the river folklore is connected to this river.

The folksong, Langnyu-Khiamjangje is directly associated with river. One line is Langnyu water is flowing.

Its water volume is said to have been significantly reduced over time. The people of the region were primarily dependent on this river for fish and other aquatic resources. It supports farming and other agricultural activities. The river course remains the same and the aquatic resources in this river are threatened.

== Geography ==
This river has been very useful to the community over century. Before technology intervened, the use of water was for agriculture. A small hydroelectric power plant sits at the source under Noklak district to harness the potential for generating electricity for neighbouring villages and towns.

The two rivers Tizu and Zunki are under consideration to be designated national waterways. This would simplify commerce between India and western parts of Myanmar.

A crossing in the south leads to Thuonoknyu and neighbouring villages. In the north, a crossing connects Patsho Village to Kingnyu. Another road goes from Noklak to Nokhu Village and Noklak to Pangsha and Dan villages at the border.

== Ecology ==
The Langnyu is a fish habitat for approximately 80 km and supports diverse aquatic species. The breed of local fish named Langnyu ngouh dominates in the region. Other species like Langnyu jokchie, Papilio memnon are mostly found along the river.
