= Mount Khelia =

Mountain in the Indian state of Nagaland

Patsho Khiamniungan : ISO 639-3(kix) [Khülio King]
- Location within Nagaland Location within India Location within Asia Location within Earth

Highest point
- Elevation: 3,462 m (11,358 ft)
- Listing: Highest peaks in Nagaland 2nd
- Coordinates: 26°4′24″N 95°11′6″E

Naming
- Language of name: Khiamniungan Naga

Geography
- Location: Noklak District, Nagaland, India
- Parent range: Patkai Range

Climbing
- Easiest route: Hiking

Mount Khülio-King (/kʰə.³³liɔ̯³¹.kɪŋ³³/) , alternatively called Khelia King, is the second highest peak in the Noklak Indian state of Nagaland. It is one of the highest in Khiamniungan region and lies along the India–Myanmar border in Patkai Range. The peak connects Mount Saramati in the east of Patsho village and south of Noklak. The area is generally isolated and difficult to access for humans, allowing the natural landscapes and local biodiversity to remain relatively untouched by human intervention.

== Significance ==
Mount Khülio-King is important for the local ecology; it provides a habitat for species such as Blyth's Tragopan, the state bird of Nagaland. In 2023, a team of biologists discovered a specimen of the Fritillaria crassicaulis at the mountain, a species previously only known to inhabit Nepal, Sichuan, and Yunnan. The scientists concluded that the species, although present in India, was likely exclusive to Mount Khülio. Similarly, in 2025, researchers uncovered samples of the Saxifraga rufescens dwelling on the mountain, species which were previously unknown in Nagaland.

Saktum Wonti, a researcher at the Highland Institute, visited the nearby town of Wui in 2023, where she recorded the words of a local Gaonburha who stated that the villagers were accustomed to foretelling the weather based upon the positioning of the sun as viewed from the peak of Mount Khülio. However, the Gaonburha—as reported by Wonti—purported that, in recent times, this method had become unreliable, as rain was appearing more unpredictably. According to Wonti, this shift in weather phenomena is attributable to climate change. In the past, the mountain has served as a defensive position to safeguard local inhabitants during times of conflict.

== Route ==
The mountain is accessible via the Choklangan or Wui Villages, although travel is obstructed by hazardous road conditions.
