= Wonsoi =

Village in Nagaland, India

- village
- Location in Nagaland, India
- Coordinates: 26.249743°N 95.060836°E
- Country: India
- State: Nagaland
- District: Noklak

Population (2011)
  - Total: 924

Languages
  - Official: Wolam, Patsho Khiamniungan
- Time zone: UTC+5:30 (IST)
- Vehicle registration: NL

Wansoi or Wonthoi village is situated 38 km away from district headquarter Noklak and 94 km away from Tuensang.

== Literacy ==
Literacy rate of Wansoi village is 63.10% out of which 65.35% males and 61.13% females are literate. There are about 161 houses in Wansoi village.
