= Thongtsuo =

Village in Nagaland, India

- village
- Location in Nagaland, India
- Coordinates: 26.036251°N 94.933231°E
- Country: India
- State: Nagaland
- District: Noklak

Population (2011)
  - Total: 239

Languages
  - Official: Patsho Khiamniungan
- Time zone: UTC+5:30 (IST)
- Vehicle registration: NL

Thongtsuo village is located in Thuonoknyu circle of Noklak district in Nagaland, India. It is situated 17 km away from sub-district headquarter Thonoknyu (tehsildar office) and 79 km away from district headquarter Tuensang.

Thongtsuo has a total population of 239 peoples, out of which male population is 131 while female population is 108. Literacy rate of Thongtsuo village is 65.69% out of which 68.70% males and 62.04% females are literate. There are about 48 houses in thongtsou village. According to the 2011 census, the location code of the village code is 268026.

Tuensang is nearest town to Thongtsuo for all major economic activities, which is approximately 79 km away.
