= Peshu =

Village in Nagaland, India

- village
- Location in Nagaland, India
- Coordinates: 26.054527°N 94.972324°E
- Country: India
- State: Nagaland
- District: Noklak

Population (2011)
  - Total: 3,447

Languages
  - Official: Patsho Khiamniungan & Peshu
- Time zone: UTC+5:30 (IST)
- Vehicle registration: NL

Peshu village is located in Thuonoknyu circle of Noklak district in Nagaland, India. It is situated 15 km away from sub-district headquarter Thuonoknyu and 111 km away from Tuensang.
