= Longsingking =

Village in Nagaland, India

- village
- Location in Nagaland, India
- Coordinates: 25.989931°N 94.953873°E
- Country: India
- State: Nagaland
- District: Noklak

Population (2011)
  - Total: 757

Languages
  - Official: Patsho Khiamniungan & Tikhir
- Time zone: UTC+5:30 (IST)
- Vehicle registration: NL

Longsingking or Thoktsur is a village is in Thuonoknyu circle of Tuensang district in Nagaland, India. It is situated 9 km from sub-district headquarter Thuonoknyu (tehsildar office) and 105 km away from district headquarter Tuensang.

Thoktsur has a total population of 757 peoples, out of which male population is 411 while female population is 346. Literacy rate of thoktsur village is 62.48% out of which 62.77% males and 62.14% females are literate. There are about 149 houses in Thoktsur village.

Tuensang is nearest town to Thoktsur for all major economic activities, which is approximately 105 km away.
