= Kingpau =

Village in Nagaland, India

Kingpao
- village
- Location in Nagaland, India
- Coordinates: 26.111399°N 95.078291°E
- Country: India
- State: Nagaland
- District: Noklak

Population (2011)
  - Total: 148

Languages
  - Official: Patsho Khiamniungan
- Time zone: UTC+5:30 (IST)
- Vehicle registration: NL

Kingpau or Kingpao village is located in Nokhu circle of Noklak district in Nagaland, India.
