= Langnok =

Village in Nagaland, India

- village
- Location in Nagaland, India
- Coordinates: 26.190100°N 95.046541°E
- Country: India
- State: Nagaland
- District: Noklak

Population (2011)
  - Total: 1,307

Languages
  - Official: Patsho Khiamniungan
- Time zone: UTC+5:30 (IST)
- Vehicle registration: NL

Langnok is a rural village located close to the international boundary between India and Myanmar. It is administered within Nokhu circle of Noklak district in Nagaland, India. It is situated 18km away from sub-district headquarter Nokhu (tehsildar office) in Khiamniungan region Noklak
