= Pangsha village =

Village in Nagaland, India

- village
- Location in Nagaland, India
- Coordinates: 26.264701°N 95.104670°E
- Country: India
- State: Nagaland
- District: Noklak

Population (2011)
  - Total: 2,575

Languages
  - Official: Patsho Khiamniungan & Veulam
- Time zone: UTC+5:30 (IST)
- Vehicle registration: NL

Pangsha is a village in Noklak district in Nagaland. It is situated 31km from the district headquarter and 87km from Tuensang district.

== Demographics ==
Pangsha has a population of 2,575 people, including 1,294 male and 1,281 females, in 458 houses. The literacy rate is 64.78% out of which 66.07% males and 63.47% females are literate.
