= Pang village =

Village in Nagaland, India

- village
- Location in Nagaland, India
- Coordinates: 25.945018°N 94.944619°E
- Country: India
- State: Nagaland
- District: Noklak

Population (2011)
  - Total: 674

Languages
  - Official: Patsho Khiamniungan
- Time zone: UTC+5:30 (IST)
- Vehicle registration: NL

Pang village is located in Thuonoknyu circle of Noklak district in Nagaland, India. It is situated 25 km away from sub-district headquarter Thuonoknyu (tehsildar office) and 121 km away from parent district headquarters Tuensang. The language most widely spoken is Patsho Khiamniungan, that of the Patsho people there.

== Population ==
Pang has a total population of 1,174, out of whom the male population is 674 while the female population is 500. The literacy rate of Pang village is 43.95%, out of which 45.85% are males and 41.40% are females. There are about 208 houses in Pang village.
