= Forum for Naga Reconciliation =

Naga Peace Convention

- Formation: 24 February 2008
- Headquarters: Dimapur
- Key people: Wati Aier, Dolly Kikon, Aküm Longchari, Ellen Konyak

The Forum for Naga Reconciliation was formed in 2008 after the Naga Peace Convention organised by the Naga Shisha Hoho in Dimapur. At the start, it had 14 members. Wati Aier is the founding-convenor for the association. It has emerged as a major force in the Indo-Naga peace process outside the negotiation room between the Indian state and Naga nationalist groups.

== Foundation ==
On 24 February 2008, the Forum for Naga Reconciliation (FNR) was formed in principle. It was one of the outcomes of the three-day Naga Peace Convention in Dimapur organised by Shisha Hoho, a Christian prayer group. Few had responded to the call and the convention was scantily attended. FNR was formally inaugurated at Kohima on 25 March 2008 with the support of 39 Naga organisations along with the Nagaland Baptist Church Council and Council of Naga Baptist Churches. It also had the support from members of Society of friends and American Baptist Churches USA. The forum sought to reconcile various Naga armed groups on the basis of the historical and political rights of the Nagas. Though some of its members are Christians associated with church institutions, it is not a church organisation.

It then had the support of several Naga organisations such as the Naga Hoho, Eastern Naga People's Organisation, Eastern Naga Students' Federation, Eastern Naga Students Association, GBs and DBs Federation Nagaland, Naga Women's Union, Manipur, United Naga Council Manipur, All Naga Students Association Manipur, Naga Mothers' Association, Naga Students' Federation, Naga People's Movement For Human Rights, office bearers of the Naga Shisha Hoho, and speakers of the Naga Peace Convention.

== Indo-Naga Peace efforts ==
FNR was formed at the peak of violence between various factions of the Naga armed groups, suspicious, distrust, and divisive political rhetoric. It has facilitated various agreements between the Naga armed groups. At various points, independent observers, government bureaucrats, as well as the Indian security establishment have admitted that inter-factional killings among the Naga nationalist groups have reduced due to FNR's efforts.

In January 2019, FNR called for re-imagining of the Naga peace process keeping people and their aspirations at its core. Therefore, it appealed for a multi-dimensional approach with active participation of all stakeholders. FNR believed that this will strengthen "the process and open up possibilities for transparency, accountability, credibility, and integrity, making it viable and responsive." It asserted that the present deadlock in the peace process stems from lack of reconciliation essential for historical and political transformation.

In December 2020, FNR further appealed for "honest discussion, truth speaking, healing, forgiveness, and reconciliation" to be embedded in the peace process. Analysing the Indian state agenda of creating divisions amongst the Nagas during the Indo-Naga peace talks, it stated

[The] trauma and wounds are still raw and sensitive, provoking the worst out of each other. It, therefore, is not surprising that the Indian state and its agencies with guile and statecraft have actively steered the statehood narrative intensifying division and simultaneously normalising complacency and conformity among the Naga populace. But to what end? A divided Naga house is in nobody’s long-term interest.

Between May 2008 to June 2015, and September 2022 to June 2024, a total of 286 official meetings were held between the Naga political groups and FNR.

=== Covenant of Reconciliation ===
After several visits, FNR brought together three out of the four Naga political groups, namely NSCN (IM), NSCN (K), and the Federal Government of Nagaland/Naga National Council for a meeting. Due to security reasons, they decided to have it outside Nagaland. On 21 August 2008, representatives from various Naga political groups, tribal organisations, and the church and civil society organisations adopted the 10-point Covenant of Common Hope at the third Naga Peace Summit at Chiang Mai, Thailand. This served as foundation for the Covenant of Reconciliation (CoR). FNR was instrumental in facilitating both these covenants between various Naga organisations and groups.

On 31 May 2009, during a Christian foot-washing service in Chiang Mai, one of the retired generals of the political group knelt before a younger man and asked for forgiveness for the violence inflicted on the Naga people. After nine meetings, five times outside of India numbering 28 days, and twelve times in Naga areas, Isak Chishi Swu, S. S. Khaplang, and S Singnya. signed the Covenant of Reconciliation on 13 June 2009. The signatories committed before God to offer themselves to Naga Reconciliation and Forgiveness based on the Historical and Political Rights of the Nagas. They resolved to work together in the spirit of love, nonviolence, peace and respect to resolve outstanding issues among themselves. The Covenant of Reconciliation was instrumental in the cessation of armed confrontation and bloodshed among the Naga political groups. The terms "covenant" and "reconciliation" used in the process have a Christian context. Part of the covenant reads:

Having been deeply convicted by God’s call in Christ, and the voice of the Naga people, we hereby solemnly commit before God to offer ourselves to Naga Reconciliation and Forgiveness based on the Historical and Political Rights of the Nagas. We resolve to continue to work together in this spirit of love, non-violence, peace and respect to resolve outstanding issues amongst us.

==== First renewal ====
The covenant was reaffirmed on 18 September 2010 in Dimapur. Top leaders from the two factions of National Socialist Council of Nagaland (NSCN) as well as Naga National Council/Federal Government of Nagaland (NNC/FGN). They included Thuingaleng Muivah (NSCN-IM), N. Kitovi Zhimomi (NSCN-K), and S. Singnya. They issued a joined declaration, “We commit to cessation of all forms of hostilities, including any territorial expansion (supremacy of one group over other in geographical term), and for this the Joint Working Group (of three factions) will meet from time to time.” The Nagaland government welcomed the statement at a state cabinet meeting acknowledging it as a major step "towards realising unity, understanding and oneness among all sections of Naga society." It extended its appreciation to all the stakeholders involved in the process.

Ever since, FNR has been marking 13 June as a day to renew the covenant.

==== Silent years ====
After the government of India invited the NSCN (IM) for talks which led to the signing of the Framework Agreement in 2015, there was discontent amongst the other Naga political groups on being sidelined. The other two political groups left out from the agreement namely, NSCN-K and NNC/FGN suspected that FNR had a role in the negotiations. On 30 November 2015, the two political groups decided to move away from the FNR-led covenant. The years between November 2015 and August 2022 are viewed as the silent years between the Naga political groups and FNR.

During these years, the Naga National Political Groups (NNPG) was formed with R. N. Ravi as the government interlocutor for the Naga talks signed the Agreed Position document on 17 November 2017. The newly formed political groups numbering seven became part of the talks. Later, these groups gave rise to newer factions led by new leaders. During these years, some of the leaders did attend a renewal of the covenant.

==== Ninth anniversary ====
In 2018, the ninth anniversary of the covenant was held at the Dimapur Ao Baptist Arogo in Duncan Basti, Dimapur. Various members from the Naga insurgent groups attended and affirmed their commitment. Thinuoselie Keyho of the Naga National Council reminded the group that not very long ago the Indian Army thought that the Naga movement could be destroyed in a few weeks or months. On the other hand, the Naga leaders at times questioned how long they could fight the Indian state. They believed that they could do so only for three months. However, Keyho pointed out that even 63 years hence the Indo-Naga conflict goes on. Keyho pointed out that the FNR has still not managed to bring together all Naga nationalist group, inviting them to still push further. Representing the Isac-Muivah faction of the National Socialist Council of Nagaland (NSCN), V. Makritsu renewed the organisation's vow, "We reiterate our stand that together we have started, together we shall finish it. NSCN shall never back out from its commitment to it... now is the time of the Nagas [sic] to reassemble under one political roof." C. Singson from the Unification faction of NSCN said, "Leaving aside all the difference as a person, as political leaders with contrasting ideology and principles, we will learn to accept each other through reconciliation and love for the nation (Naga-Land)." Singson commended FNR for bringing a spiritual reawakening to the Naga movement and restoring the "lost consciousness of the people." Though no representative from the Khaplang faction of the NSCN were present, they sent a statement informing their commitment to the covenant.

At the same meeting, two persons who had suffered through the ensuing violence also spoke of their loss, grief, and forgiveness. One of them, Khetoli spoke of her life after her husband was shot dead a decade ago when he was on his way from Dimapur to Zunheboto. She was left with small children to look after. She shared that she had forgiven those who had killed her husband and requested others to forgive people in their lives who had done wrong to them. Visasier Kevichüsa, whose father and uncle were killed similarly within a span of four years, spoke of his life as a child thereafter. The killings shaped, influenced, and changed his family. Through his experience, he learnt that to forgive meant everything and it was the way of Christ who he follows. Today, Kevichüsa is a Baptist pastor.

==== Tenth anniversary ====
On 13 June 2019, FNR marked ten years since the signing of the covenant with an appeal that churches in all Naga areas ring their bells and chimes at noon for 60 seconds.

==== End of silent years ====
FNR was asked to arrange for a meeting between the NSCN-IM and NNPG in August 2022. This led to the signing of the 'Joint September Accordant' between them on 14 September 2022 at Sovima affirming the covenant.

== Recover, Restore, and Decolonise ==
FNR, along with anthropologists Dolly Kikon and Arkotong Longkumer, initiated dialogues with Pitt Rivers Museum to collaborate on the possible repatriation of Naga ancestral remains housed in the museum. During the British colonial era, Naga human remains were taken from the Naga areas and today is housed in various museums across Europe and in private collections.
