= Choklangan =

Village in Nagaland, India

- village
- Location in Nagaland, India
- Coordinates: 26.103755°N 95.083668°E
- Country: India
- State: Nagaland
- District: Noklak

Population (2011)
  - Total: 2,027

Languages
  - Official: Patsho Khiamniungan & Nokhu
- Time zone: UTC+5:30 (IST)
- Vehicle registration: NL

Choklangan is a village in the Indian state of Nagaland, located between the mountain of Mount Khelia King (/kʰə.³³lɪɒ³¹.kɪŋ³³/), Kenking, and Enshau king. The village is 57 km away from the District HQ Noklak.
