= Aniashu =

Village in Nagaland, India

- village
- Location in Nagaland, India
- Coordinates: 26.158398°N 95.071610°E
- Country: India
- State: Nagaland
- District: Noklak

Population (2011)
  - Total: 568

Languages
  - Official: Patsho Khiamniungan & Nokhu
- Time zone: UTC+5:30 (IST)
- Vehicle registration: NL

Aniashu is a village located in Nokhu circle of Noklak district which is situated 27 km away from sub-district headquarter Nokhu (tehsildar office), 65 km Noklak and 109 km away from Tuensang. It is located at an altitude of 1137m.
