= Benei M. Lamthiu =

Indian politician

Benei M. Lamthiu (born 1983) is an Indian politician from Nagaland. He was elected to the Nagaland Legislative Assembly from the Thonoknyu Assembly constituency, which is reserved for Scheduled Tribes, in Noklak District. He won the 2023 Nagaland Legislative Assembly election, representing the National People's Party.

== Early life and education ==
Lamthiu is from Thonoknyu, Noklak District, Nagaland. He is the son of P. Mongchua. He completed his B.A. in 2006 at a college affiliated with the North Eastern Hill University, Meghalaya. He was formerly in government service.

== Career ==
Lamthiu was elected from the Thonoknyu Assembly constituency representing the National People's Party in the 2023 Nagaland assembly election. He polled 10,462 votes and defeated his nearest rival and former MLA, S. Heno Khiamniungan of the Nationalist Democratic Progressive Party, by a margin of 2,325 votes. He is a first time MLA . Two time sitting MLA, L. Khumo Khiamniungan, who left the NPP, could only get 47 votes. In the thanksgiving programme after the victory, he assured the people of his constituency that his priority would be the constituency and not the party. He visited the local areas including the Primary Health Centre and the police station and took stock of the situation.
