= Tsangkui =

Village in Nagaland, India

- village
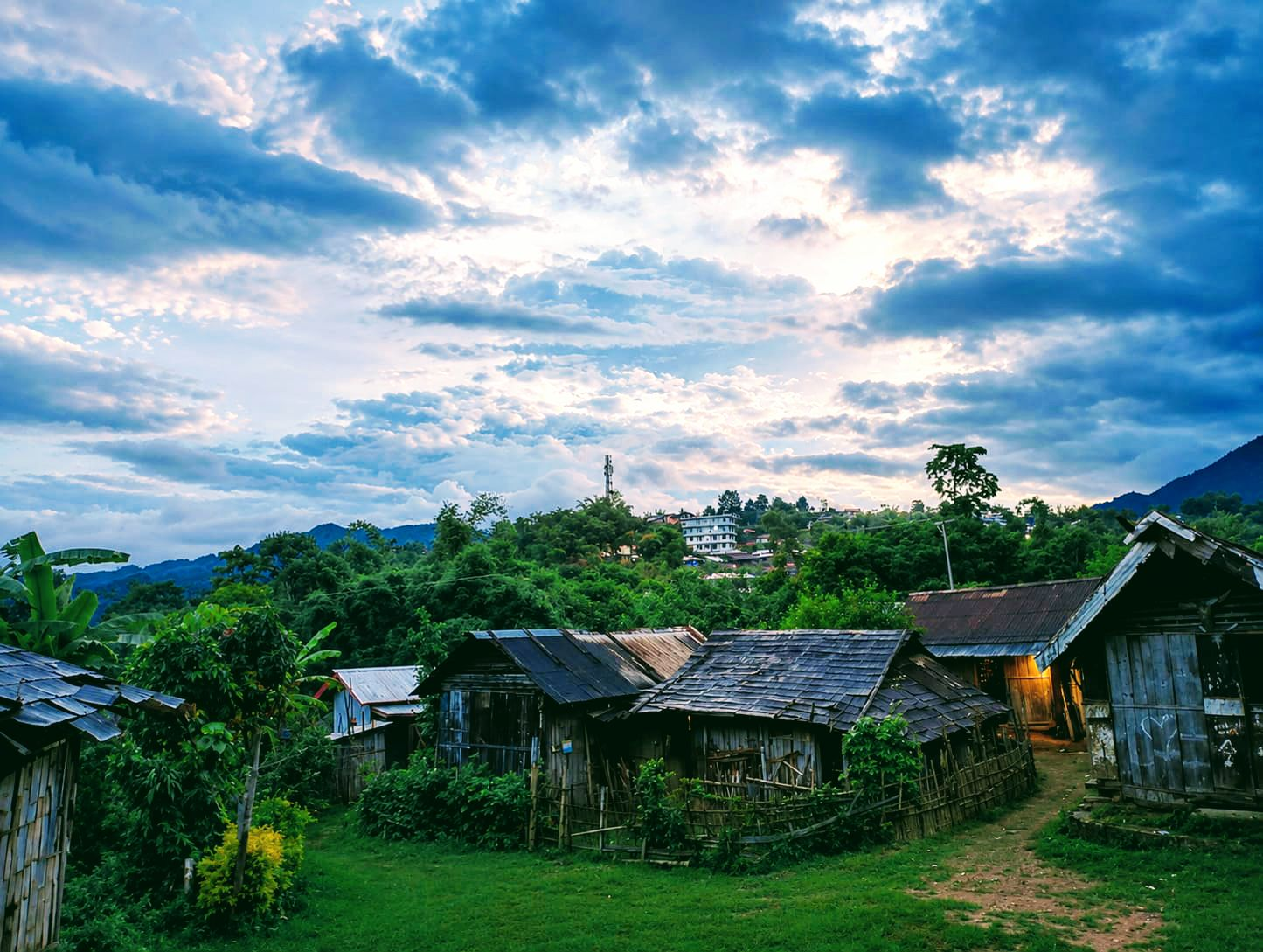
- Tsāngkūi nòk

- Location in Nagaland, India
- Coordinates: 26.107424°N 94.935089°E
- Country: India
- State: Nagaland
- District: Noklak

Population (2011)
  - Total: 213

Languages
  - Official: Patsho Khiamniungan
- Time zone: UTC+5:30 (IST)
- Vehicle registration: NL

Tsangkui, also known as Tsangkoi, is a village is located in Panso circle of Tuensang district in Nagaland, India.

== Location ==
It is situated 2 km away from sub-district headquarter Panso (tehsildar office) and 79 km away from district headquarter Tuensang.

== Language ==
The language most widely spoken is Patsho Khiamniungan, that of the Patsho people there.

Tsangkui Village
Total population
- 213 (2011),

Languages
- Patsho Khiamniungan

Religion
- Christianity

Related ethnic groups
- Patsho people
