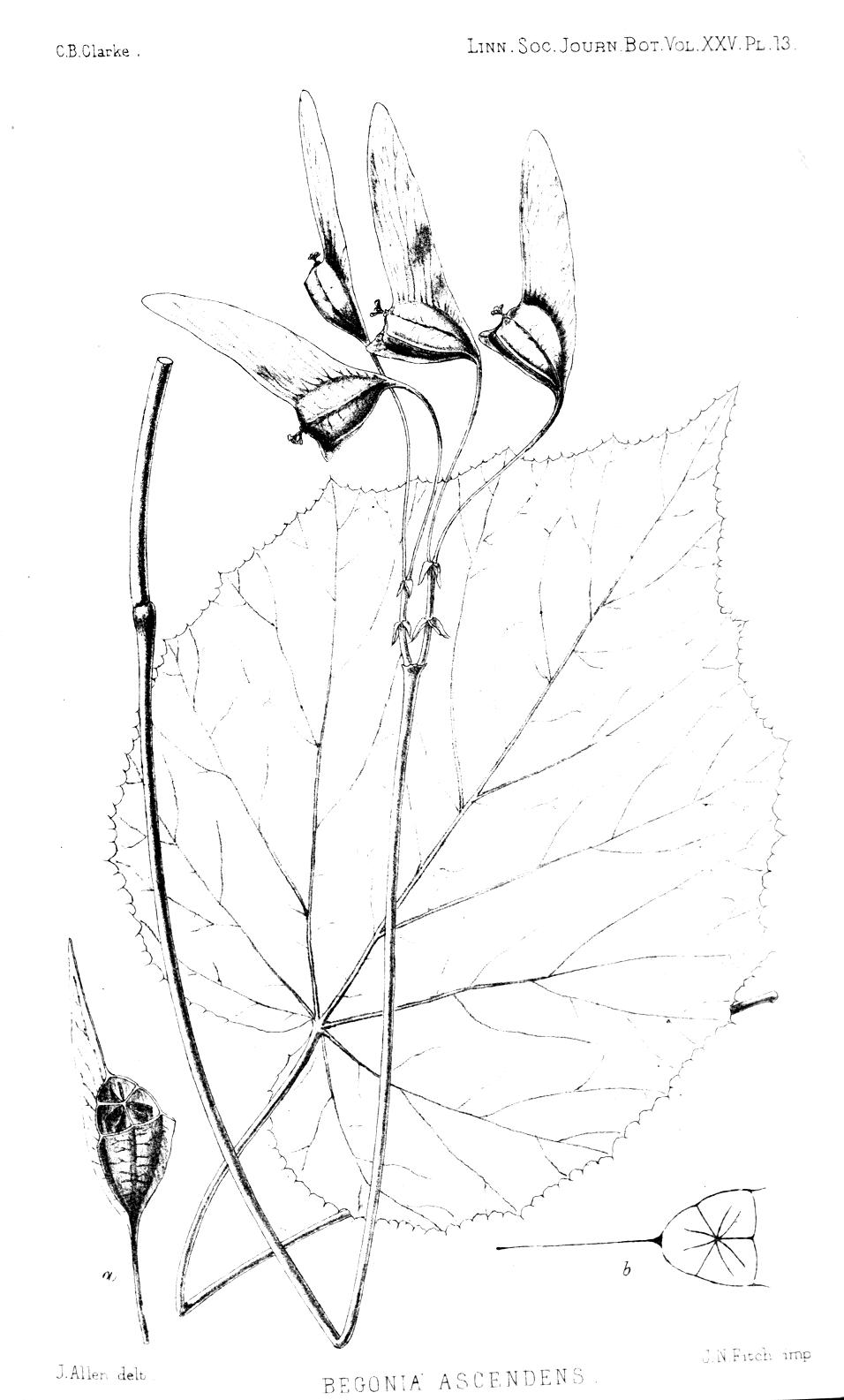

Scientific classification
- Kingdom: Plantae
- Clade: Tracheophytes
- Clade: Angiosperms
- Clade: Eudicots
- Clade: Rosids
- Order: Cucurbitales
- Family: Begoniaceae
- Genus: Begonia
- Species: B. adscendens

Binomial name
- Begonia adscendens C.B.Clarke

= Begonia adscendens =

Species of plant

Begonia adscendens is a rare species of flowering plant in the family Begoniaceae. It is native to wet shady subtropical forests in Nagaland and Manipur in India, and it may be found in similar habitats in Arunachal Pradesh, Assam, and northern Southeast Asia. A tuberous geophyte reaching 50 cm (20 in), it is typically found growing in sandy soil or on rocks. After its collection by Charles Baron Clarke from the area of Mount Japfü in the Naga Hills in 1889, it was not collected in the wild again for 116 years.
