= S. Anungla =

Indian pastor

S. Anungla is the first full-time female pastor amongst the Chang Naga tribes in Nagaland. In 2011, she was appointed to the position at Chang Baptist Church in Kohima.

== Education ==
She completed her Bachelor in Theology and Bachelor in Divinity from the Union Biblical Seminary in Pune.

== Pastoral life ==
After her theology studies, she worked at the Eleutheros Christian Society (ECS) in Tuensang with drug addicts in rehabilitation for three months.

Prior to her appointed as pastor, she had already worked for ten years as the secretary of the women department of the Chang Baptist Lashoung Thangyen (CBLT).
