= List of mountains in Nagaland =

Nagaland is a part of the complex mountain barrier on the Indo–Myanmar border inhibiting the foothills of the Himalayas.

== List ==
The following is a list of selected mountains in Nagaland, ordered by height:

Mountain	Meters	Feet	District
Mount Saramati	3,840	12,600	Kiphire district
Mount Khülio-King	3,462	11,358	Noklak district
Mol Len	3,066	10,059	Meluri district
Mount Japfü	3,048	10,000	Kohima district
Mount Tempü	2,994	9,823	Kohima district
Mount Pauna	2,841	9,321	Peren district
Kapamüdzü	2,620	8,600	Phek district
Mount Tiyi	1,970	6,460	Wokha district

== See also ==
- List of mountains in India
