= Sangsangyu =

Coordinates: 26.3282°N 94.8958°E

Sangsangyu is a village, in Tuensang district of Nagaland, India. Sangsangyu is the Block Headquarters of the eight villages which are: Hakchang, Konya, Kejok, Chendang, Nyinyem, Maksha, Keshai and Sangsangyu. The villagers accepted this agreement during the 1970s under the leadership of the CRVCU (Changsang Range Village Council Union) and CRSU (Changsang Range Students' Union). The largest village in the Sangsangyu Block is Hakchang, and the smallest is Keshai Village. Out of its total population, 90% of this people earn their living by farming.
