= International Trade Center =

International Trade Center may refer to:

- International Trade Centre, an agency of World Trade Organization and United Nations
- International Trade Center (New Jersey), an office park in New Jersey, United States
- International Trade Center (Salvador, Brazil), an office building in Salvador, Brazil
- International Trade Center 260, an office building in Taichung, Taiwan
- International Trade Centre DAN, a located in Nagaland, India
- International Trading Center, a building in Ho Chi Minh City, Vietnam, see 2002 Ho Chi Minh City ITC fire
