= Kejok =

Village in Tuensang, Nagaland, India

Kejok is a village in the Sangsangyu block of the Tuensang district, Nagaland, India.

Ophai Kejok is actually "Ophai Phejok", but "Ophai Kejok" is the name recognized by the Government of India. The village is located in a mountain range named "Ophai", between the Konya and Tuensang villages, under the Sangsangyu Block. The village was founded by four people who migrated from the Tuensang villages of Ongh, Kangshou, Haongang and Lomou. The eldest person among them is credited with the founding of the new village.

== Ophai ==
The name "ophai" means "Risen Mountain". It is named after a legend that tells of a girl named Momola who lived with her father, a fisherman, during the age of the head hunters. One day, when her father had caught no fish, he prayed to the river and ocean gods, promising that if they blessed him with a net full of fish, he would repay them by sacrificing his only daughter to them. The gods filled his net with fish, but the fisherman did not keep his promise to the gods. Before the full moon rose, the river and ocean flooded the hill calling, "MO MO MO MO". The fisherman pushed his daughter into the rising waters, and, following his daughter's sacrifice, the waters receded and the mountain grew taller. Thus, the mountain is called Ophai -- "Risen Mountain".
