= Lienyu =

River in India

Lienyu, also known as Leen and Lin, is one of the largest and a right bank tributary of Langnyu river with a confluence just below Noklak town. This river flows between the villages of Tshüvau, Lingnyu and Noklak town, draining one of the largest age-old landslides called Kiamong sütaih.
