= Thonoknyu Assembly constituency =

Legislative Assembly constituency in Nagaland State, India

Coordinates: 25.97°N 94.9°E

Thonoknyu
- Constituency No. 57 for the Nagaland Legislative Assembly

Constituency details
- Country: India
- Region: Northeast India
- State: Nagaland
- District: Tuensang
- Lok Sabha constituency: Nagaland
- Established: 1974
- Total electors: 20,830
- Reservation: ST

Member of Legislative Assembly
- 14th Nagaland Legislative Assembly
- Incumbent Benei M. Lamthiu
- Party: NPP
- Alliance: NDA
- Elected year: 2023

Thonoknyu is one of the 60 Legislative Assembly constituencies of Nagaland state in India.

It is part of Tuensang district and is reserved for candidates belonging to the Scheduled Tribes.

== Members of the Legislative Assembly ==
Year	Member	Party
1974	Mongchua Khiamungan	United Democratic Alliance
1977	Pongom	Indian National Congress
1982	P. Pongon	Naga National Democratic Party
1987	P. Pongom	Naga National Democratic Party
1989	T. Khongo	Naga People's Front
1993	T. Khongo	Naga People's Front
1998	Shingnyu	Indian National Congress
2003	S. Heno Khiamniungan	Nationalist Democratic Movement
2008	S. Heno Khiamniungan	Naga People's Front
2013	L. Khumo Khiamniungan	Nationalist Congress Party
2018	L. Khumo Khiamniungan	National People's Party
2023	Benei M. Lamthiu	National People's Party

== Election results ==
=== 2023 Assembly election ===
2023 Nagaland Legislative Assembly election: Thonoknyu
Party	Candidate	Votes	%	±%
NPP	Benei M. Lamthiu	10,467	56.06%	4.18%
NDPP	S. Heno Khiamniungan	8,139	43.59%	25.50%
LJP(RV)	L. Khumo Khiamniungan	47	0.25%	
NOTA	Nota	17	0.09%	
Margin of victory		2,328	12.47%	−12.54%
Turnout		18,670	89.63%	2.16%
Registered electors		20,830		12.69%
NPP hold		Swing	4.18%	

=== 2018 Assembly election ===
2018 Nagaland Legislative Assembly election: Thonoknyu
Party	Candidate	Votes	%	±%
NPP	L. Khumo Khiamniungan	8,389	51.89%	
NPF	S. Heno Khiamniungan	4,345	26.87%	−10.42%
NDPP	Y. P. Chillio	2,925	18.09%	
INC	Pakhiu Khiamniungan	392	2.42%	−2.07%
NOTA	None of the Above	117	0.72%	
Margin of victory		4,044	25.01%	17.69%
Turnout		16,168	87.47%	−10.00%
Registered electors		18,484		0.95%
NPP gain from NCP		Swing	7.27%	

=== 2013 Assembly election ===
2013 Nagaland Legislative Assembly election: Thonoknyu
Party	Candidate	Votes	%	±%
NCP	L. Khumo Khiamniungan	7,963	44.62%	
NPF	S. Heno Khiamniungan	6,656	37.29%	2.67%
Independent	Y. P. Chillio	2,412	13.51%	
INC	Pakhiu Khiamniungan	803	4.50%	0.38%
Margin of victory		1,307	7.32%	−6.08%
Turnout		17,847	97.47%	6.47%
Registered electors		18,310		3.02%
NCP gain from NPF		Swing	9.99%	

=== 2008 Assembly election ===
2008 Nagaland Legislative Assembly election: Thonoknyu
Party	Candidate	Votes	%	±%
NPF	S. Heno Khiamniungan	5,600	34.62%	26.29%
Independent	Pongom	3,432	21.22%	
Independent	P. K. F. Tochu	2,791	17.26%	
RJD	Khongo	1,609	9.95%	
JD(S)	Dr. N. L. Aimong	1,535	9.49%	
INC	Khonou	666	4.12%	−14.38%
Margin of victory		2,168	13.40%	−4.16%
Turnout		16,174	91.12%	−7.24%
Registered electors		17,774		44.05%
NPF gain from NDM		Swing	-1.44%	

=== 2003 Assembly election ===
2003 Nagaland Legislative Assembly election: Thonoknyu
Party	Candidate	Votes	%	±%
NDM	S. Heno Khiamniungan	4,371	36.06%	
INC	N. L. Aimong	2,242	18.50%	−11.68%
Independent	S. Shingnyu	1,717	14.17%	
JD(U)	P. Pongom	1,663	13.72%	
BJP	T. Khaikho	1,117	9.22%	
NPF	Shillem	1,010	8.33%	
Margin of victory		2,129	17.57%	11.86%
Turnout		12,120	98.24%	4.41%
Registered electors		12,339		14.81%
NDM gain from INC		Swing	3.32%	

=== 1998 Assembly election ===
1998 Nagaland Legislative Assembly election: Thonoknyu
Party	Candidate	Votes	%	±%
INC	Shingnyu	3,022	30.18%	0.71%
Independent	N. L. Aimong	2,451	24.48%	
Independent	S. Heno Khiamniungan	2,422	24.19%	
Independent	P. Pongom (Khiam)	2,119	21.16%	
Margin of victory		571	5.70%	3.03%
Turnout		10,014	93.83%	−4.34%
Registered electors		10,747		7.52%
INC gain from NPF		Swing	-2.56%	

=== 1993 Assembly election ===
1993 Nagaland Legislative Assembly election: Thonoknyu
Party	Candidate	Votes	%	±%
NPF	T. Khongo	3,206	32.74%	−13.55%
Independent	Khisangmong	2,944	30.07%	
INC	S. Heno Khiamniungan	2,885	29.46%	−12.44%
Independent	S. Shingnyo	757	7.73%	
Margin of victory		262	2.68%	−1.71%
Turnout		9,792	98.17%	0.47%
Registered electors		9,995		43.63%
NPF hold		Swing	-13.55%	

=== 1989 Assembly election ===
1989 Nagaland Legislative Assembly election: Thonoknyu
Party	Candidate	Votes	%	±%
NPF	T. Khongo	3,123	46.29%	
INC	P. Pongom	2,827	41.90%	18.37%
Independent	Shingnyu	797	11.81%	
Margin of victory		296	4.39%	0.52%
Turnout		6,747	97.70%	2.25%
Registered electors		6,959		0.51%
NPF gain from NND		Swing	18.90%	

=== 1987 Assembly election ===
1987 Nagaland Legislative Assembly election: Thonoknyu
Party	Candidate	Votes	%	±%
NND	P. Pongom	1,793	27.39%	−1.47%
INC	S. Heno Khiamniungan	1,540	23.53%	5.23%
NPP	Mongchua Khiamungan	1,323	20.21%	
Independent	P. K. F. Tochu	1,270	19.40%	
Independent	T. Longso Khimn	620	9.47%	
Margin of victory		253	3.86%	−3.16%
Turnout		6,546	95.45%	19.25%
Registered electors		6,924		−33.99%
NND hold		Swing	-1.47%	

=== 1982 Assembly election ===
1982 Nagaland Legislative Assembly election: Thonoknyu
Party	Candidate	Votes	%	±%
NND	P. Pongon	2,280	28.86%	
Independent	Khuno Khiamniongan	1,725	21.84%	
Independent	K. Yanchi Tikhir	1,715	21.71%	
INC	Pottu	1,445	18.29%	−13.28%
Independent	S. Heno Khiamniungan	734	9.29%	
Margin of victory		555	7.03%	−4.09%
Turnout		7,899	76.20%	−13.75%
Registered electors		10,489		47.98%
NND gain from INC		Swing	-2.71%	

=== 1977 Assembly election ===
1977 Nagaland Legislative Assembly election: Thonoknyu
Party	Candidate	Votes	%	±%
INC	Pongom	1,982	31.58%	
Independent	Pottu	1,284	20.46%	
NCN	K. Yanchi Tikhir	1,266	20.17%	
UDA	Kheno	1,223	19.48%	−16.28%
Independent	Mongchua Khiamungan	522	8.32%	
Margin of victory		698	11.12%	−3.60%
Turnout		6,277	89.95%	12.81%
Registered electors		7,088		13.61%
INC gain from UDA		Swing	-4.19%	

=== 1974 Assembly election ===
1974 Nagaland Legislative Assembly election: Thonoknyu
Party	Candidate	Votes	%	±%
UDA	Mongchua Khiamungan	1,664	35.76%	
NNO	M. T. Mongba	979	21.04%	
Independent	Yanchumong Ticker	819	17.60%	
Independent	Chuba	717	15.41%	
Independent	R. Thongthong	474	10.19%	
Margin of victory		685	14.72%	
Turnout		4,653	77.14%	
Registered electors		6,239		
UDA win (new seat)				

== See also ==
- List of constituencies of the Nagaland Legislative Assembly
- Tuensang district
