= P. Paiwang Konyak =

Indian politician

Member of the Nagaland Legislative Assembly
- Incumbent
- Assumed office 2013
- Constituency: Tizit

Personal details
- Party: Bharatiya Janata Party

P. Paiwang Konyak is an Indian politician from Nagaland and member of the Bharatiya Janata Party. He was the Minister of Transport, Civil Aviation and Railways, Land Resource in the Fourth Rio ministry in Nagaland from 2018 to 2023. Currently he is the Cabinet Minister of Health and Family Welfare Nagaland in the Fifth Rio ministry. He has been a member of the Nagaland Legislative Assembly from the Tizit constituency in Mon district since 2013.
