= Eastern Nagaland Peoples' Organization =

Interpublic organization

Eastern Nagaland Peoples' Organisation (ENPO) is the apex body of seven Naga tribes in the eastern Nagaland region. It has been demanding a separate state since its inception.

== History ==
ENPO, representing the Chang, Khiamniungan, Konyak, Phom, Sangtam, Tikhir, and Yimkhiung communities had been demanding for a separate state since 2010.

== Structure ==
The ENPO Federating Tribal Bodies are Chang Khulei Setshang (CKS), Eastern Sumi Hoho (ESH), Khiamniungan Tribal Council (KTC), Konyak Union (KU), Phom Peoples' Council (PPC), United Sangtam Likhum Pumji (USLP), Tikhir Tribal Council (TTC), and Yimkhiung Tribal Council (YTC).

== Objectives ==
The main focus of the organization is to protect and secure its people and ensure statehood to the people of Eastern Nagaland.
