= Barail Range =

Mountain range in Northeast India

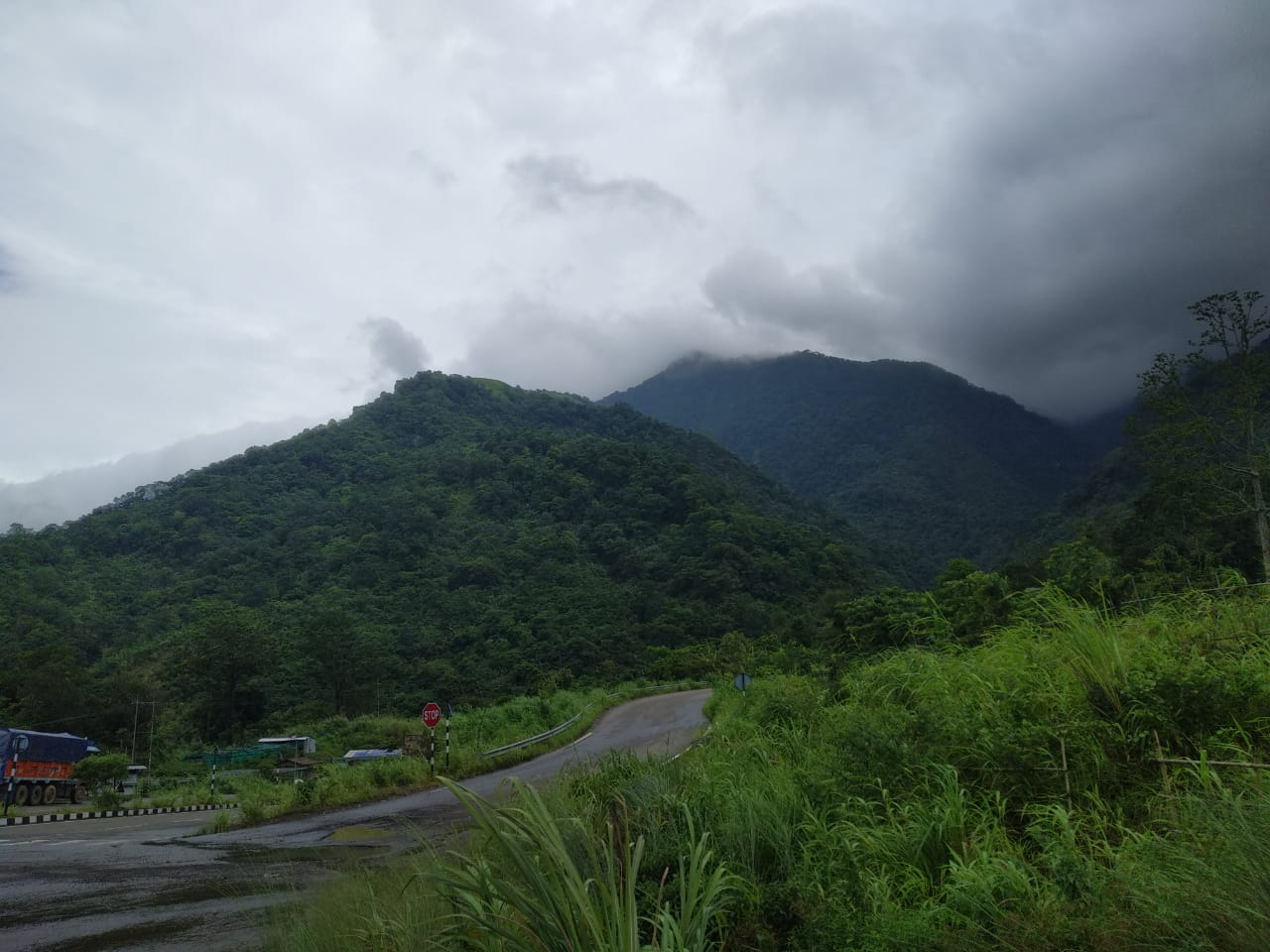
- The Assam section of the Barail Range

Highest point
- Peak: Mount Japfü
- Elevation: 3,048 m (10,000 ft)
- Coordinates: 25°16′27″N 93°20′51″E

Dimensions
- Length: 720 km (450 mi)

Geography
- Country: India
- States: Assam, Meghalaya, Manipur and Nagaland
- Region: Northeast India
- Rivers: Barak, Brahmaputra and Kopili
- Settlements: Dima Hasao, Kohima, Shillong, Diphu and Silchar
- Range coordinates: 25°00′N 93°30′E

Geology
- Orogeny: Himalayan Orogeny
- Rock type: Sandstone

The Barail Range is a tertiary mountain range in Northeast India with an area of approximately 80,000 ha between Brahmaputra and Barak basins stretching from Nagaland & Manipur to the east and Assam & Meghalaya to the west.

Highest Peak is Mount Japfü (3,048 m) in Nagaland. Other notable peaks are Laike (1,959 m), Theipibung (1,866m), Mahadevi (1,739m) and Kaukaha (1,736m).
