= Wati Aier =

Indian theologian

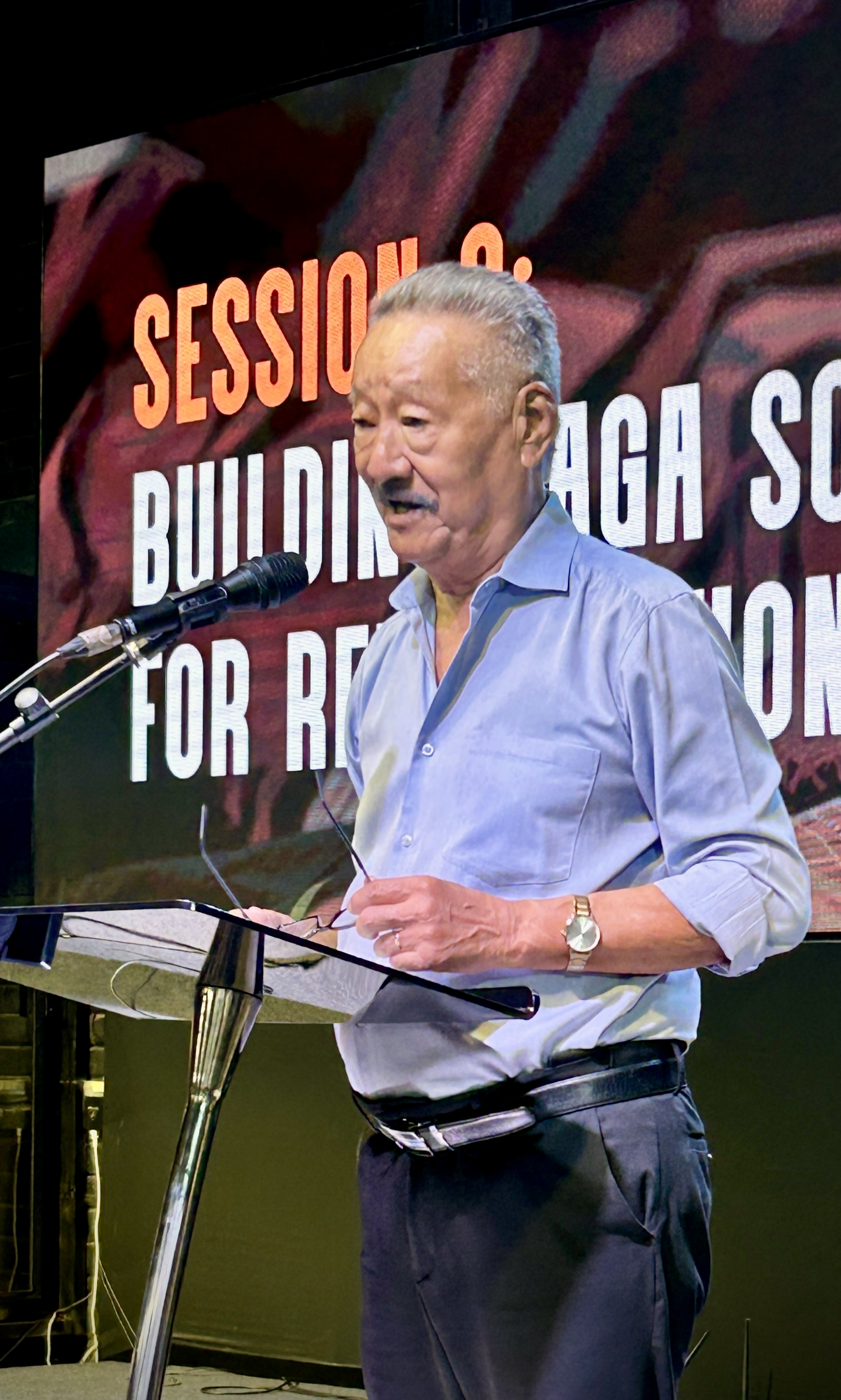
- Born: 1948 (age 77–78)
- Occupation: Theologian
- Spouse: Alongla Aier

Wati Aier (born 1948) is a Naga theologian. He is the Convenor of the Forum for Naga Reconciliation, and a former Vice President of the Asia Pacific Baptist Federation.

== Early Ministry ==
On Aier's ministry, Chongpongmeren Jamir writes that he was the first Naga theologian to "clearly expound the need for socio-political engagement of the church" in society. In his 1989 book, A Cry from the Rice Fields: A call of freedom for the Nagas, Aier wrote,

"The Church must witness with more than words. Through the life, service and, sacrifice of their members, they must make their contribution to justice and peace, to the improvements of human conditions, and to the care of the needy and of the homeless. They must serve humbly the needs of the less developed peoples. In persecution and oppression, they can still witness to the spiritual freedom which their members enjoy".

== Oriental Theological Seminary ==
In 1991, the Nagaland Baptist Church Council gave Aier the responsibility to start and build the Oriental Theological Seminary (OTS) from scratch. Bade village in Chümoukedima District donated the land for the seminary. Aier along with his wife, Alongla Aier, began with clearing the forested area. Thereafter, they began with setting thatched-roof classrooms. Wati Aier cooked for the students joined them for weekly football matches and played the trumpet in the seminary choir. He also wrote and composed several songs for the OTS choir who sang them at reconciliation meetings. In his own words, they are songs of forgiveness and common belonging; songs of approaching a shared future.

On 27 May 2017, he retired as the Principal of the Oriental Theological Seminary (OTS) after 26 years in the position. The incoming Principal of the Seminary, Joshua Lorin, announced that the OTS library will be renamed the Wati Aier Peace Library. After retirement, Aier became the Emeritus Professor of Constructive Theology and Philosophy at OTS.

== Forum for Naga Reconciliation ==
Aier has served as the Convenor of the Forum for Naga Reconciliation since its formation in 2008. Aier was one of the signatories of the solidarity statement, Myanmar We Care-–We Are With You, in resistance to the February 2021 military coup in Myanmar.

As the Convenor of the Forum for Naga Reconciliation (FNR), he said that victims of the 2021 Nagaland killings represent the Naga community. He pointed out that military excesses in the past were not heard beyond Nagaland. However, this time the world has taken notice of the 'mourning of the Nagas'. After the seven day mourning for the victims, he emphasised that while the mourning period was over, it was just the beginning of the fight for justice. He called the Nagas to stand united in this endeavour. FNR along with 26 other organisations demanded the immediate withdrawal and repeal of the Armed Forces (Special Powers) Act in Nagaland and sought justice for the victims of the 2021 Nagaland killings.

== Awards ==
In March 2011, Aier was selected for the Baptist World Alliance Denton and Janice Lotz Human Rights Award 2010. It was in recognition of his work for reconciliation among various Naga groups. He had brought together the two factions (I-M and K) of the National Socialist Council of Nagaland, the Federal Government of Nagaland, and Naga National Council to sign the Covenant of Reconciliation in June 2009 at Chiang Mai, Thailand. The award was given to him in June 2011 at Kuala Lumpur, Malaysia.

In 2018, he delivered the annual Chalie Kevichüsa Memorial Lecture on "Beyond Tribal Seduction – A Personal Reflection."

On 30 November 2019, Aier received the A. Kevichüsa Citizenship Award. In his acceptance speech, he reminded everyone that there is no future without forgiveness; the Naga identity needs transformation through forgiveness, healing, and peace. He elaborated,

We must immediately shun the fallacy that seeking forgiveness is a sign of weakness. Rather it is the other way around. Seeking forgiveness should be the greatest power of the Nagas at this moment. By not forgiving, are we not destroying the thing we all wanted?
