= Nokhu =

Village in Nagaland, India

- village
- Location in Nagaland, India
- Coordinates: 26.174030°N 95.008131°E
- Country: India
- State: Nagaland
- District: Noklak

Population (2011)
  - Total: 1,875

Languages
  - Official: Patsho Khiamniungan& Nokhu
- Time zone: UTC+5:30 (IST)
- Vehicle registration: NL

Nokhu is an immediate neighbour village to the district headquarter Noklak. The village is located in Nokhu circle of Noklak district in Nagaland, India.
