= Eastern Naga Students' Federation =

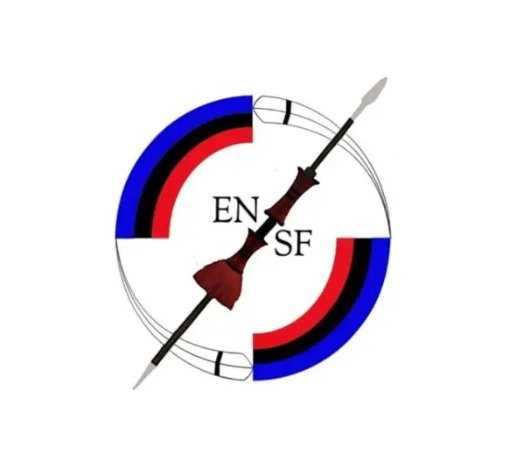
- Abbreviation: NSF
- Type: Student Organization
- Headquarters: Tuensang, Nagaland, India
- Region served: Northeast India: Noklak; Tuensang; Longleng; Mon; Kiphire; Shamator
- Official language: English
- President: Chingmak Kumchuba Chang

The Eastern Naga Students' Federation (ENSF; /ˌiːˈɛn.ɛsˈɛf/) is the largest representative body for students from the eastern Nagaland region. The federating units consists of Chang Wedoshi Setshang, Khiamniunngan Students’ Union, Konyak Students’ Union, Phom Students’ Conference, Tikhir Students’ Union, United Sangtam Students’ Conference, and Yimkhiung Akheru Arihako.
