= Kingjong =

Village in Nagaland, India

Kingjung
- village
- Location in Nagaland, India
- Coordinates: 26.012413°N 95.025424°E
- Country: India
- State: Nagaland
- District: Noklak

Government
  - Village Council Chairman: C Lamsong Khiamniungan

Population (2011)
  - Total: 1,035

Languages
  - Official: Peshu Khiamniungan
- Time zone: UTC+5:30 (IST)
- Vehicle registration: NL

Kingjung or Kenjong is a village located in Thonoknyu circle of Noklak district in Nagaland, India. It is situated 36 km away from sub-district headquarter Thonoknyu and 132 km away from Tuensang.
