= Fritillaria crassicaulis =

Scientific classification
- Kingdom: Plantae
- Clade: Tracheophytes
- Clade: Angiosperms
- Clade: Monocots
- Order: Liliales
- Family: Liliaceae
- Subfamily: Lilioideae
- Tribe: Lilieae
- Genus: Fritillaria
- Species: F. crassicaulis

Binomial name
- Fritillaria crassicaulis S.C.Chen

Synonyms
- Fritillaria omeiensis S.C.Chen

Species of flowering plant

Fritillaria crassicaulis is an Asian species of herbaceous plant in the lily family Liliaceae, native to Sichuan and Yunnan Provinces in China.

Fritillaria crassicaulis is a bulb-forming herbaceous perennial up to 80 cm tall. Flowers are nodding (hanging downward), yellow or greenish yellow, often with brown or purple spots.

Flora of China lists Fritillaria wabuensis as an additional synonym of F. crassicaulis, but World Checklist considers F. wabuensis a synonym for the accepted F. unibracteata var. wabuensis.
