= Oriental Theological Seminary =

Coordinates: 25.818°N 93.656°E

- Motto: "Being Transformed to Transform"
- Type: Private
- Established: 1991; 35 years ago
- Affiliations: Nagaland Baptist Church Council
- Location: Bade, Chümoukedima District, Nagaland
- Website: otsnagaland.edu.in

Oriental Theological Seminary (OTS) is a premier Baptist theological institute in Bade, Chümoukedima District, Nagaland, India. It is affiliated with the Nagaland Baptist Church Council.

== History ==
It was founded in 1991 by Nagaland Baptist Church Council (NBCC). Wati Aier was the first Principal of the institution. At its inception, the NBCC gave Dr. Wati Aier the responsibility to start and build the institution from scratch. Bade village donated the land for the seminary. Aier along with his wife, Alongla Aier, began with clearing the forested area. Thereafter, they began with setting thatched roof classrooms. Wati Aier cooked for the students, joined them for weekly football matches, and played the trumpet in the seminary choir. He also wrote and composed several songs for the OTS choir.

In September 2017, Dr. Joshua Lorin took the reins as the Principal from Aier.

== Academics ==
Courses offered by the institution are Master of Divinity and Master of Theology.

On 1 December 2019, OTS launched its MA in Clinical Counselling programme. It is an interdisciplinary course engaging psychology, theology, and Christian practices. The head of department for counselling, Ellen Konyak Jamir envisioned the programme to nurture Christian leaders to serve people through the practice of clinical counselling.
