= International Trade Centre DAN =

Village in Nagaland, India

International Trade Center DAN
- village
- Location in Nagaland, India
- Coordinates: 26.290958°N 95.128287°E
- Country: India
- State: Nagaland
- District: Noklak

Languages
  - Official: Known to Patsho Khiamniungan & Veulam
- Time zone: UTC+5:30 (IST)
- Vehicle registration: NL

The International Trade Centre DAN is a located in Noklak district in the Indian state of Nagaland. It is 36 km from the district Hq, and is the last village (Pangsha) in the north of the district.

== Tourism ==
The International Trading Centre (ITC) holds economic potential. The nearest places of interest include Bao Yam Shing in Wonthoi Village and Village Guards Museum at Pangsha village.
