= Tizit Assembly constituency =

Legislative Assembly constituency in Nagaland State, India

Coordinates: 26.9°N 95.08°E

Tizit
- Constituency No. 41 for the Nagaland Legislative Assembly

Constituency details
- Country: India
- Region: Northeast India
- State: Nagaland
- District: Mon
- Lok Sabha constituency: Nagaland
- Established: 1974
- Total electors: 20,696
- Reservation: ST

Member of Legislative Assembly
- 14th Nagaland Legislative Assembly
- Incumbent P. Paiwang Konyak
- Party: Bharatiya Janata Party
- Elected year: 2023

Tizit is one of the 60 Legislative Assembly constituencies of Nagaland state in India.

It is part of Mon district and is reserved for candidates belonging to the Scheduled Tribes.

== Members of the Legislative Assembly ==
Year	Member	Party
1974	P. Enyei Konyak	Nagaland Nationalist Organisation
1977	P. K. Along	United Democratic Alliance
1982	N. Yeangphong Konyak	Indian National Congress
1987	N. Yeangphong Konyak	Indian National Congress
1989	Yeangphong	Naga People's Front
1993	B. Tingkap Wangnao	Indian National Congress
1998	Tingkup	Indian National Congress
2003	N. Yeangphong Konyak	Naga People's Front
2008	Aloh	Indian National Congress
2013	P. Paiwang Konyak	Bharatiya Janata Party
2018	P. Paiwang Konyak	Bharatiya Janata Party
2023	P. Paiwang Konyak	Bharatiya Janata Party

== Election results ==
=== 2023 Assembly election ===
2023 Nagaland Legislative Assembly election: Tizit
Party	Candidate	Votes	%	±%
BJP	P. Paiwang Konyak	10,428	52.99%	11.86%
INC	T. Thomas Konyak	5,825	29.60%	29.21%
NPF	Tahwang Angh	3,374	17.15%	10.72%
NOTA	Nota	52	0.26%	
Margin of victory		4,603	23.39%	9.33%
Turnout		19,679	95.09%	1.45%
Registered electors		20,696		14.17%
BJP hold		Swing	11.86%	

=== 2018 Assembly election ===
2018 Nagaland Legislative Assembly election: Tizit
Party	Candidate	Votes	%	±%
BJP	P. Paiwang Konyak	6,981	41.13%	−5.79%
Independent	Y. Wangto Konyak	4,595	27.07%	
JD(U)	T. Hatpha Wangnao	4,169	24.56%	
NPF	Khongjah Konyak	1,091	6.43%	−22.97%
NOTA	None of the Above	70	0.41%	
INC	Naowang Konyak	67	0.39%	−10.98%
Margin of victory		2,386	14.06%	−3.47%
Turnout		16,973	93.63%	1.67%
Registered electors		18,127		−1.81%
BJP hold		Swing	-5.79%	

=== 2013 Assembly election ===
2013 Nagaland Legislative Assembly election: Tizit
Party	Candidate	Votes	%	±%
BJP	P. Paiwang Konyak	7,967	46.92%	45.99%
NPF	Aloh	4,991	29.40%	−8.01%
NCP	Hatpha Wangnao	2,085	12.28%	
INC	Penkham Konyak	1,932	11.38%	−39.00%
Margin of victory		2,976	17.53%	4.56%
Turnout		16,979	91.97%	3.11%
Registered electors		18,462		−2.34%
BJP gain from INC		Swing	-3.46%	

=== 2008 Assembly election ===
2008 Nagaland Legislative Assembly election: Tizit
Party	Candidate	Votes	%	±%
INC	Aloh	8,463	50.38%	22.38%
NPF	Tingkup	6,284	37.41%	−1.91%
RJD	Yeangphong	1,981	11.79%	
BJP	Khongwang	156	0.93%	−1.12%
Margin of victory		2,179	12.97%	3.26%
Turnout		16,798	89.31%	−7.83%
Registered electors		18,904		33.02%
INC gain from NPF		Swing	11.06%	

=== 2003 Assembly election ===
2003 Nagaland Legislative Assembly election: Tizit
Party	Candidate	Votes	%	±%
NPF	N. Yeangphong Konyak	5,387	39.32%	
NDM	Aloh Wangham	4,056	29.60%	
INC	Tingkup	3,837	28.01%	−23.05%
BJP	Khongwang	281	2.05%	
JD(U)	Arun	140	1.02%	
Margin of victory		1,331	9.71%	7.61%
Turnout		13,701	96.69%	8.70%
Registered electors		14,211		5.52%
NPF gain from INC		Swing	-0.39%	

=== 1998 Assembly election ===
1998 Nagaland Legislative Assembly election: Tizit
Party	Candidate	Votes	%	±%
INC	Tingkup	6,000	51.05%	11.34%
Independent	Yeangphong	5,753	48.95%	
Margin of victory		247	2.10%	−3.19%
Turnout		11,753	87.99%	−8.07%
Registered electors		13,467		−3.63%
INC hold		Swing	11.34%	

=== 1993 Assembly election ===
1993 Nagaland Legislative Assembly election: Tizit
Party	Candidate	Votes	%	±%
INC	B. Tingkap Wangnao	5,308	39.71%	−6.16%
Independent	Aloh	4,601	34.42%	
NPF	Yeangphong	3,459	25.88%	−28.26%
Margin of victory		707	5.29%	−2.97%
Turnout		13,368	96.06%	1.50%
Registered electors		13,974		36.15%
INC gain from NPF		Swing	-14.42%	

=== 1989 Assembly election ===
1989 Nagaland Legislative Assembly election: Tizit
Party	Candidate	Votes	%	±%
NPF	Yeangphong	5,149	54.13%	
INC	B. Tingkap Wangnao	4,363	45.87%	−8.44%
Margin of victory		786	8.26%	−10.54%
Turnout		9,512	94.55%	0.30%
Registered electors		10,264		0.00%
NPF gain from INC		Swing	-0.18%	

=== 1987 Assembly election ===
1987 Nagaland Legislative Assembly election: Tizit
Party	Candidate	Votes	%	±%
INC	N. Yeangphong Konyak	5,161	54.31%	13.44%
NND	B. Tingkap Wangnao	3,374	35.50%	6.54%
NPP	T. Khongwang Konyak	968	10.19%	
Margin of victory		1,787	18.80%	6.90%
Turnout		9,503	94.25%	1.73%
Registered electors		10,264		63.57%
INC hold		Swing	13.44%	

=== 1982 Assembly election ===
1982 Nagaland Legislative Assembly election: Tizit
Party	Candidate	Votes	%	±%
INC	N. Yeangphong Konyak	2,334	40.87%	9.43%
NND	P. K. Along	1,654	28.96%	
Independent	Tingkap	1,010	17.69%	
Independent	Khongwang Konyak	713	12.48%	
Margin of victory		680	11.91%	7.11%
Turnout		5,711	92.53%	6.21%
Registered electors		6,275		18.11%
INC gain from UDA		Swing	4.63%	

=== 1977 Assembly election ===
1977 Nagaland Legislative Assembly election: Tizit
Party	Candidate	Votes	%	±%
UDA	P. K. Along	1,632	36.23%	−2.18%
INC	Mankho	1,416	31.44%	
Independent	Wangkep	1,144	25.40%	
Independent	Khongwang	312	6.93%	
Margin of victory		216	4.80%	−5.02%
Turnout		4,504	86.32%	9.24%
Registered electors		5,313		21.69%
UDA gain from NNO		Swing	-12.00%	

=== 1974 Assembly election ===
1974 Nagaland Legislative Assembly election: Tizit
Party	Candidate	Votes	%	±%
NNO	P. Enyei Konyak	1,553	48.23%	
UDA	Chingai	1,237	38.42%	
Independent	Nyangpong	430	13.35%	
Margin of victory		316	9.81%	
Turnout		3,220	77.07%	1. VALUE!
Registered electors		4,366		
NNO win (new seat)				

== See also ==
- List of constituencies of the Nagaland Legislative Assembly
- Mon district
