= Mount Japfü =

Mountain in the Indian state of Nagaland

- Location within Nagaland Location within India Location within Asia Location within Earth

Highest point
- Elevation: 3,048 m (10,000 ft)
- Listing: Highest peaks in Nagaland 2nd
- Coordinates: 25°35′51″N 94°04′00″E

Geography
- Location: Kohima District, Nagaland
- Parent range: Barail Range

Climbing
- Easiest route: Hiking

Mount Japfü (/jæpfu/, YAP-FU) is a mountain peak of the Barail Range, located in Kohima District of Nagaland in India, about 15 kilometres (9 mi) south of Kohima, the capital of Nagaland.

== Geography ==
With a summit elevation of 3,048 m (10,000 ft), it is the fourth highest mountain in the Indian state of Nagaland and the highest in the Barail Range.

The peak of Mount Japfü receives snowfall in the winter months from December to February.

== Flora ==
Mount Japfü holds the Guinness World Record for the tallest rhododendron tree in the world. It was discovered in 1993 and recorded a height of 20 m (65 ft).

== See also ==
- List of mountains in Nagaland
