= Chang Naga =

Naga ethnic group

Regions with significant populations
- Tuensang district, Nagaland, India: 64226 (2011)

Languages
- Chang language

Religion
- Christianity (99.45%), Animist (0.37%)

Related ethnic groups
- Other Naga people

The Changs are a major Naga ethnic group inhabiting the Northeast Indian state of Nagaland. They were also known as Mazung in British India. Other Naga ethnic groups know the Changs by different names including Changhai (Khiamniungan), Changru (Yimkhiung), Duenching (upper Konyak), Machungrr (Ao), Mochumi (Sümi) and Mojung (Konyak).

== Etymology ==
'Chang' in their language mean 'East'. Another theory of origin of the word is 'Chognu' meaning 'Banyan tree'.

== Origin ==
According to oral tradition, the Changs emerged from a place called Changsangmongko, and later settled at Changsang. The word Chang is said to have been derived from the word chognu (banyan tree), after a mythical banyan tree that grew at the now-abandoned Changsang.

Another theory says that the Chang migrated to present-day Nagaland from the east, and therefore call themselves Chang ("Eastern" in the local dialect).

Some Changs also claim the Aos as their ancestors. The Chang folklore is similar to that of the Ao.

== Demographics ==
The traditional territory of the Changs lies in the central Tuensang district. Their principal village was Mozungjami/Hakű in Tuensang, from which they expanded to the other villages.

According to the 2011 figures, their population was 64226.

== Society ==
=== Divisions ===
Hamlet Bareh (2010) lists four major exogamous Chang clans (phangs), each with a traditional religious function.

According to the Chang mythology, their ancestors lived with wild animals, some of which have assumed the status of clan spirits. The Ong clan regards the tiger as a clan spirit, while the others regard wild cats and birds (crows and eagles) as spirits.

Braja Bihari Kumara (2005) lists five Chang clans: Chongpo, Ung, Lomou, Kangshou and Kudamji. The Chongpo is further divided into Shangdi, Hangwang, Hagiyung, Ungpong and Maava clans.

Historically, the clans were anchored to non-overlapping areas within the village (khel), and lived in harmony. The traditional Chang khels were well-protected and fortified.

=== Administration ===
The Chang, like several other Naga ethnic groups, practiced headhunting in the pre-British era. The person with maximum number of hunted heads was given the position of lakbou (chief), who would settle the village disputes. He was entitled to maintain special decorative marks in his house, and to wear special ceremonial dress during the festivals.

After the headhunting was abolished, the village disputes were resolved by a council of informally elected village leaders. Such councils also selected the fields for jhum cultivation, and fixed the festival dates.

The Changs constructed a platformed called "Mullang Shon" in the center of the village, which would serve as a public court. Issues such as village administration, cultivation, festivals, marriages and land boundaries were discussed on this platform.

The State Government of Nagaland later established Village Development Boards in all the villages. The Village Development Board consists of 5–6 members, including one female member. It executes the development schemes in the village. The statutory village council consists of 6–7 adult men from different clans or territories (khels). This council maintains peace and order in the village, settles civil disputes according to the traditional laws, arranges for arrest of criminals and enforces the Government regulations. A higher-level area council comprises members elected by the village councils. The area council settles the inter-village disputes, and implements the welfare schemes.

The official interpreters (dobhashis) are recruited from important villages by the Deputy Commissioner of the district. These dobhashis help settle ethnic cases, and fix the fine rates for some of the cases. The traditional village judges (youkubu) also help resolve the land disputes.

== Religion ==
As of 2001, about 99.5% of the Changs were Christians. However, the Changs were originally animists. They believed in a continuity between the humans, the nature and the supernatural forces. They do not worship any family, clan or village deities. But, they believe in several nature spirits (water, sky, jungle etc.) The most important spirit is Sampule Mukhao (or Shambuli Muhgha), the spirit of the paddy field. Traditionally, the Ongbou (the village priest from the Ong clan) performed major sacrifices during the festivals.

The Chang conversions to Christianity started in 1936, and the Chang Naga Baptist Association was formed in 1940.

In 2011, S. Anungla became the first full-time woman pastor to lead a Chang Baptist Church.

== Culture ==
=== Language ===
The Changs speak the Chang language, which belongs to the Tibeto-Burman family. Nagamese is used for communicating with the outsiders. The educated Changs also speak English and Hindi languages.

=== Clothing ===
After the advent of Christianity, several Changs have adopted modern clothing. The traditional Chang dress features distinctive shawl-like garments and ornamented headgear. Colonel Ved Prakash mentions that the Chang shawls "surpass all the Naga shawls in beauty and eye-catching patterns". The shawl designs are different for different age groups and clans. Mohnei, a cowrie-ornamented shawl, could be worn only by a man who had taken more than 6 heads.

=== Cuisine ===
The traditional Chang cuisine is non-vegetarian, and comprises a variety of meats and fish. Rice is the staple food of the . Milk, fruits and vegetables were not a major part of the traditional Chang food habits, but have been adopted widely in the modern times. Rice beer used to be of high social and ritual importance, but has largely been abandoned after the conversion of Changs to Christianity.

=== Traditional games top spinning and performance with kongki ===
On Naknyulem festival, elderly men carve 'yan' (top) and make kongki (Jew 'sharp ).Young boys compete in top-spinning and are rewarded with millet cakes and other delicacies. It is believed that gods come down to the earth every night during festivals and collect yan & vii (saponaria seeds), hence, each of these are placed at the entrance of every house. On this days, the womenfolk also play haunting folk tunes using the kongki.

=== Music ===
The traditional instruments include xylophone, various drums (made by stretching animal hide), bamboo trumpets and bamboo flutes. The traditional instruments have been replaced by guitar among the modern Changs.

=== Social practices ===
The traditional Chang society is patrilineal, and the men inherit the land and the positions of authority. Nuclear families are predominant in the Chang society. The marriage is called chumkanbu, and remarriages are permitted.

=== Festivals ===
Being Christians, the modern Changs celebrate Christmas in a big way. They have six traditional festivals:

| Festival | Time | Monitored by the clan | Description |
|---|---|---|---|
| Naknyu Lem (or Naknyulum) | July–August | Ung | Festival dates are fixed 2 days ahead. Naknyu Lem is a 6-day festival during which the dead are honored and the sky god/spirit is appeased. Marriages are prohibited during the period. Household fires are lit during the night. |
| Po-anglum or Poang Lem | December | Chongpo | Festival dates are fixed 6 days ahead. |
| Jeinyu Lem | | Chongpo | Festival dates are fixed 6 days ahead. |
| Muong Lem | | Ung | Festival dates are fixed 6 days ahead. |
| Monyu Lem | | Ung | Festival dates are fixed 6 days ahead. |
| Kundang Lem (or Kundanglum) | April/July | Chongpo | Festival dates are fixed 5 days ahead. Kundang Lem is a five-day festival. The first three days are spent collecting the construction material for field huts in the Jhum cultivated area. The material is tested on the fourth day, and the huts are collectively constructed on the fifth day. The festival ends with feasting. |

==== Naknyulüm ====
Naknyulüm is the major traditional festival of the Changs. According to the Chang mythology, the ancient people had to remain inside their homes for six days due to extreme darkness. Naknyulüm is held to celebrate the light on the seventh day.

On the first day, the domestic animals are slaughtered, the villages are cleaned, and firewood and water are stocked.

On the second day (Youjem, dark moon day), the tribals exchange gifts and food items, and play sports. Women play a musical instrument called kongkhin. The paths and the houses are decorated with leaves, and a shrub called Ngounaam is planted in front of the house to ward off the evil spirits. At sunset, seeds called Vui long are buried inside the rice husks and burnt around the house. The fragments of the exploding seeds moving away from the house are considered a good omen. If the fragments bound back towards the house, it is a bad omen. People don't go out of their homes at sunset, as it is believed that the spirit Shambuli Muhgha visits the village, and harms anyone outside the house.

On the third day, the village and the approach roads are cleaned. Later, the paths leading to the fields and neighbouring villages are cleaned.

== Economy ==
Agriculture is the traditional occupation of the ethnic Chang people, and jhum cultivation is practiced. Rice, millets, Job's Tears, pulses and vegetables are the main crops. Trade and business were practiced mainly as subsidiary occupations.

The Changs carried out barter trade with the other ethnic groups (Yimkhiung, Khiamniungan, Ao and Konyak), exchanging shawls and other garments for the things they needed. Crafts such as wood-carving, spinning, weaving, pottery and basketry are also pursued.
