= Gaonburha =

A gaonburha or gaoburha is the leader of an Assamese village or gaon. The role of gaonburhas in Assamese gaons that are under mouzas is limited since mouzadars take the responsibility of the gaonburha. However, in gaons that are located far from district headquarters or major cities, gaonburhas still play definitive roles.

A similar position exists in Naga society.
