= Fritillaria unibracteata =

Scientific classification
- Kingdom: Plantae
- Clade: Tracheophytes
- Clade: Angiosperms
- Clade: Monocots
- Order: Liliales
- Family: Liliaceae
- Subfamily: Lilioideae
- Tribe: Lilieae
- Genus: Fritillaria
- Species: F. unibracteata

Binomial name
- Fritillaria unibracteata P.K.Hsiao & K.C.Hsia

Synonyms
- Fritillaria sulcisquamosa S.Y.Tang & S.C.Yueh; Fritillaria lixianensis Y.K.Yang & J.K.Wu; Fritillaria unibracteata var. ganziensis Y.K.Yang & J.K.Wu; Fritillaria unibracteata var. maculata S.Y.Tang & S.C.Yueh; Fritillaria unibracteata var. sulcisquamosa (S.Y.Tang & S.C.Yueh) P.K.Hsiao & S.C.Yu; Fritillaria wabuensis S.Y.Tang & S.C.Yueh (syn of F. unibracteata var. wabuensis)

Species of flowering plant

Fritillaria unibracteata is a species of flowering plant in the lily family Liliaceae, native to Gansu, Qinghai, Sichuan Provinces in China.

It is a bulb-forming perennial up to 40 cm tall. The flowers are pendent and nodding, bell-shaped, dark purple with yellowish-brown markings.

Varieties

- Fritillaria unibracteata var. longinectarea S.Y.Tang & S.C.Yueh - Sichuan
- Fritillaria unibracteata var. unibracteata - Gansu, Qinghai, Sichuan
- Fritillaria unibracteata var. wabuensis (S.Y.Tang & S.C.Yueh) Z.D.Liu, Shu Wang & S.C.Chen - Sichuan
