= Mount Saramati =

Highest peak of Nagaland at mountainous border of India and Myanmar

Saramati
- စာရာမေတိတောင်
- Location within Nagaland Location within India Location within Myanmar

Highest point
- Elevation: 3,826 m (12,552 ft)
- Prominence: 2,885 m (9,465 ft); Ranked 113th
- Listing: Ultra; Ribu; Highest peaks in Nagaland 1st
- Coordinates: 25°44′24″N 95°2′15″E

Geography
- Location: India–Myanmar border
- Parent range: Naga Hills

Climbing
- First ascent: unknown

Saramati (Burmese: စာရာမေတိတောင်; IPA: [ˌsæɹəˈmɑːti]) is a peak at an altitude of 3,826 metres (12,552 ft) on the border between the Indian state of Nagaland and the Naga Self-Administered Zone of the Sagaing Region of Myanmar. On the Indian side, the Naga village of Thanamir in Kiphire District lies at its foot.

== Geography ==
It has a height of 3,826 metres (12,552 ft) and a prominence of 2,885 metres (9,465 ft). Saramati is one of the ultra-prominent peaks of Southeast Asia. It forms a natural boundary between India and Myanmar.

The peak mainly consists of shale. Most of the upper reaches is covered with pine trees.

== How to reach ==
On the Indian side, Thanamir village lies at the foothill of the peak. The village is known for its apple cultivation, and holds an annual apple festival. The village also grows a range of other horticultural products. The nearest airport is Dimapur Airport. The nearest railhead is Shokhüvi railway station, however, only two trains terminate there as of 2026. The Dimapur railway station is more accessible and has more trains.

== See also ==
- List of mountains in Nagaland
- List of mountains in Burma
- List of ultras of Southeast Asia
