= Chang language =

Sino-Tibetan language spoken in India

Chang
- Mochungrr
- /tɕáŋ ŋɤ̀ɣ/
- Native to: India
- Ethnicity: Chang Naga
- Native speakers: (62,000 cited 2001 census)
- Language family: Sino-Tibetan: Tibeto-Burman; Sal; Konyak; Konyak–Chang; Chang

Language codes
- ISO 639-3: nbc
- Glottolog: chan1313

Chang (Changyanguh), or Mochungrr, is a Sino-Tibetan language spoken in northeastern India. It is spoken in 36 villages of Tuensang District in east-central Nagaland (Ethnologue). Ethnologue reports that the Tuensang village dialect is the central speech variety that is intelligible to all Chang speakers.
