= Thuonoknyu =

Village in Nagaland, India

- village
- Location in Nagaland, India
- Coordinates: 25.970361°N 94.904617°E
- Country: India
- State: Nagaland
- District: Noklak

Population (2011)
  - Total: 136

Languages
  - Official: Patsho Khiamniungan
- Time zone: UTC+5:30 (IST)
- Vehicle registration: NL

Thuonoknyu is a rural village under Noklak District of Nagaland State, India. The word Thuonoknyu is a combination of three words of Khiamniungan dialect i.e. 'Thuo' means last 'nok' means village 'nyu' means large. Presently there is a historical stone called 'Sangkongthong Long' at Thonoknyu Village. The language most widely spoken is Patsho Khiamniungan, that of the Patsho people there.
