= Tuensang district =

- District of Nagaland
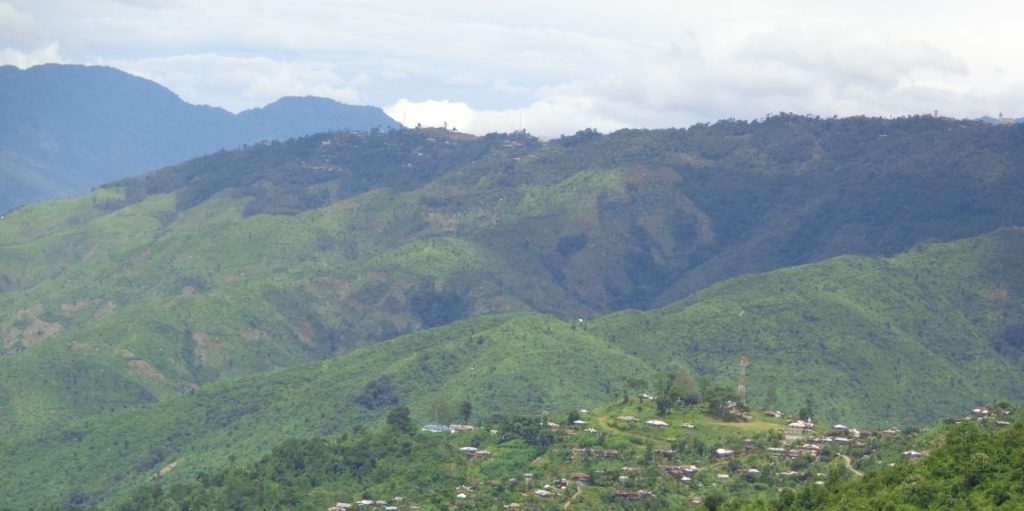
- Naga Hills
- Nickname: Land of Culture
- Tuensang District in Nagaland
- Interactive map of Tuensang district
- Coordinates: 26°15′N 94°45′E
- Country: India
- State: Nagaland
- Headquarters: Tuensang

Government
  - Lok Sabha Constituency: Nagaland
  - Deputy Commissioner: Sh. Kumar Ramnikant (IAS)
  - Assembly constituencies: 4 constituencies

Area
  - Total: 915 km^{2} (353 sq mi)

Population (2011)
  - Total: 137,296
  - Density: 150/km^{2} (389/sq mi)
- Time zone: UTC+05:30 (IST)
- ISO 3166 code: IN-NL-TU
- Vehicle registration: NL-03
- Major highways: NH 202, NH 702B
- Website: tuensang.nic.in

Tuensang district (/ˌtjuːənˈsæŋ/) is a district in Nagaland, a state in northeastern India. Its headquarters is in Tuensang town.

== History ==
Tuensang is one of the original three districts, along with Mokokchung district and Kohima district formed at the time the state was created. Over the decades, the district has gradually diminished in size with the carving out of Mon, Longleng, Kiphire, Noklak and most recently Shamator districts from it.

=== Special Provision in Indian Constitution ===
Owing to the extreme backwardness of this district, there was a special provision for the administration of Tuensang in the Indian Constitution. According to the provision, no act passed by the Parliament pertaining to the religious and social practices of Nagas, their customary law and procedure or ownership or transfer of land shall have any effect in Tuensang unless it is agreed upon by the Nagaland Legislative Assembly by a resolution. The Governor of Nagaland was given special powers on many important matters for the sake of good governance and development of the region. No act of legislature passed by the Nagaland Legislative Assembly had any effect unless it was approved by the Governor on the recommendation of the regional council. There was a special Ministry for Tuensang Affairs in Nagaland Government. The members to the Legislative Assembly were not elected directly by the people, but by a regional council. The council was formed by the Governor to look after the administration of the region. These provisions were meant to be in effect for a period of 10 years from the formation of Nagaland. These provisions were removed in 1973 after 10 years of their introduction.

== Geography ==
The district shares a long and porous international border with Myanmar all along its eastern sector. It is bounded by Mon in the north east, Longleng in the North, Mokokchung and Zunheboto in the West and Kiphire in the South, Shamator and Noklak in the east.. Dikhu and Tizu are the main rivers of the district.

== Economy ==
In 2006 the Ministry of Panchayati Raj named Tuensang one of the country's 250 most backward districts (out of a total of 640). It is one of the three districts in Nagaland currently receiving funds from the Backward Regions Grant Fund Programme (BRGF). The Likhimro Hydro project was commissioned in 2001.

== Demographics ==
Religion in Tuensang district (2011)
1. Christianity (97.0%)
2. Hinduism (2.02%)
3. Islam (0.62%)
4. Buddhism (0.35%)
5. Jainism (0.00%)
6. Sikhism (0.02%)
7. Not stated (0.04%)

According to the 2011 census of India Tuensang district has a population of 196,596, roughly equal to the nation of Samoa. This gives it a ranking of 590th in India (out of a total of 640). Tuensang has a sex ratio of 930 females for every 1000 males, and a literacy rate of 73.7%.

Changs, Sangtams, Yimkhiungs and Khiamniungans are the main indigenous tribes of this district. Besides, other Naga ethnic groups like Phoms form a small part of the district's population. Christianity is the main religion through animistic beliefs are still practised by a small minority, especially along the Myanmar border.

On January 20, 2021, a new district Noklak was carved out of the Tuensang district. Subdivisions Nokhu, Noklak, Chingmei, Panso and Thonoknyu became part of the newly created Noklak district, thus, reducing the population of Tuensang district to 137,296.

=== Languages ===
- Sangtam language
- Yimkhiungrü language
- Khiamniungan language
- Chang language

== Flora and fauna ==
In 1984, Tuensang district became home to the Fakim Wildlife Sanctuary, which has an area of 6.4 km^{2} (2.5 mi^{2}).

== Transportation ==
=== Air ===
The nearest airport is Jorhat Airport in Assam located 190 kilometres from district headquarters Tuensang. There is a helipad in Tuensang as well.

=== Rail ===
The nearest railway stations are Amguri railway station and Jorhat Town railway station located 150 kilometres and 190 kilometres from Tuensang respectively.

=== Road ===
The district is well-connected with roads. The NH 202 and NH 702B pass through the district alongside other intra-district roads.

== See also ==
- Tuensang
- Dimapur
- Nagaland
