= Tuensang =

- Town
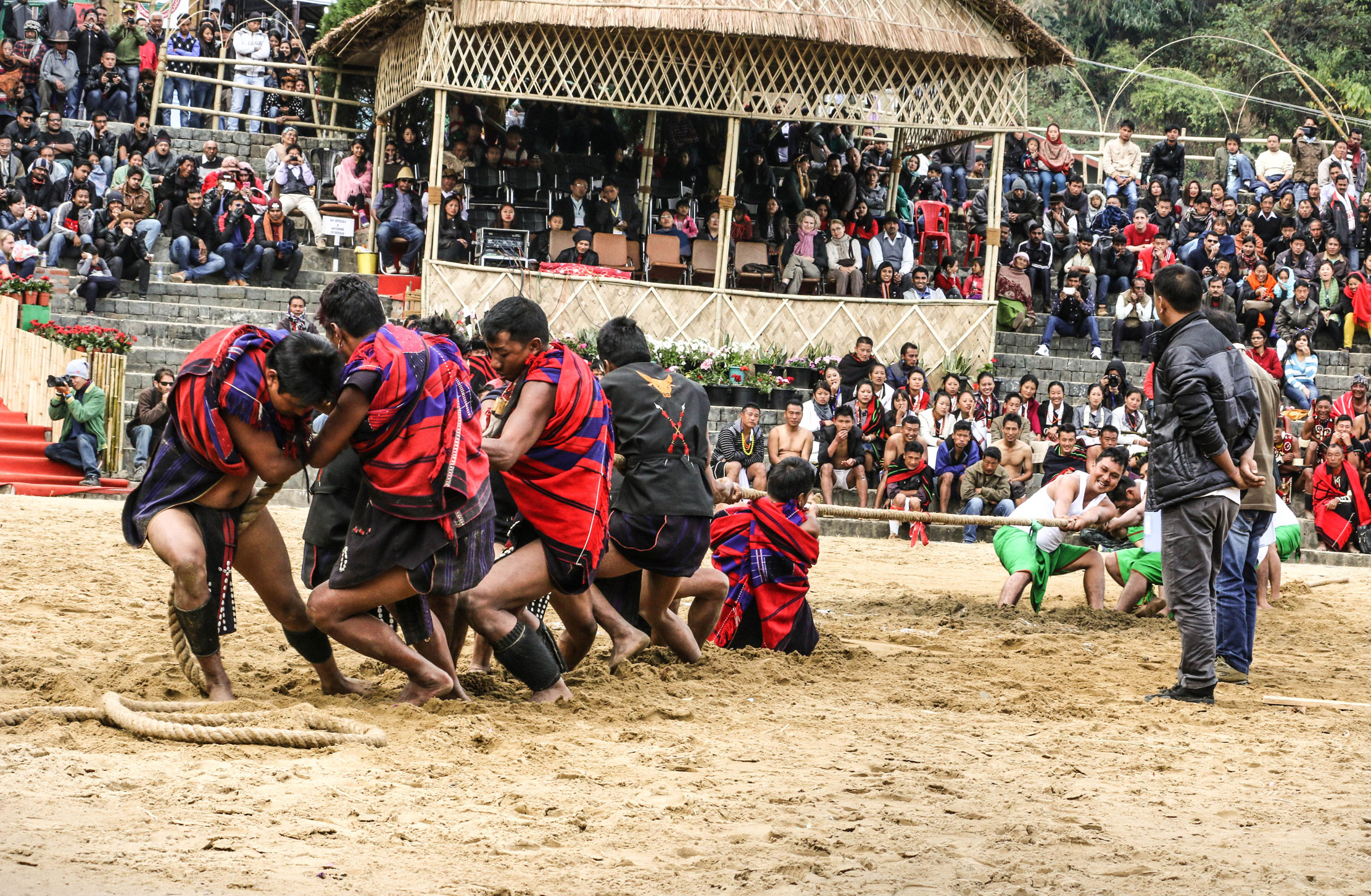
- Chang Naga tribe playing Indigenous tug of war

- Location in Nagaland Tuensang (India)
- Coordinates: 26.271559°N 94.831384°E
- Country: India
- State: Nagaland
- District: Tuensang District
- Elevation: 1,371 m (4,498 ft)

Population (2011)
  - Total: 36,774

Languages
  - Official: English
  - Major languages: Chang; Sangtam; Yimkhiungrü; Khiamniungan
- Time zone: UTC+5:30 (IST)
- Vehicle registration: NL-03
- Website: nagaland.gov.in

Tuensang (/ˌtjuːənˈsæŋ/) is a town located in the northeastern part of the Indian state of Nagaland. It is the headquarters of the Tuensang District and has a population of 36,774. The town was founded in 1947 for the purpose of administrating the erstwhile North Eastern Frontier Agency (NEFA) that comprised the present day districts of Tuensang, Mon, Longleng, Kiphire, Noklak and Shamator.

== History ==
The Tuensang area was originally made up of all the present six districts of Eastern Nagaland. Even after the British conquest of India, the Tuensang tribal region remained unadministered due to lack of sufficient men and money. However, in 1902, the area was brought under the nominal control of the British. It was called Tribal Area and was administered by the Governor General of India. In 1948, a separate division called the Tuensang Administrative Circle was created.

When the Constitution of India was first released in 1950, Tuensang Division was placed in "Part B" category of tribal districts as per the Sixth Schedule. It became part of the North-East Frontier Agency (NEFA). Subsequently, in 1957, it was merged with the Naga Hills District to form a new administrative unit under the Ministry of External Affairs. After negotiation with the secessionists, this administrative unit was later made a full-fledged state called Nagaland.

== Geography ==
Tuensang is located at 26.28°N 94.83°E. It has an average elevation of 1371 metres (4498 feet).

== Demographics ==
As of 2011 India census, Tuensang had a population of 36,774, up 24% from 29,654 in 2001. Males constitute 56% of the population and females 44%. Tuensang has an average literacy rate of 71%, higher than the national average of 59.5%: male literacy is 74%, and female literacy is 67%. In Tuensang,13% of the population is under 6 years of age.

Tuensang is one of the largest town in Nagaland next to Chümoukedima, Dimapur, Kohima and Mokokchung. The landowners/permanent tribes of the town are mainly the Changs, Sangtams, Yimkhiungs and Khiamniungans. The town serves as a nerve center for the eastern part of Nagaland.

In Tuensang are the headquarters to organisations such as Eastern Nagaland Peoples' Organisation (ENPO), Eastern Naga Students' Federation (ENSF), Khiamniungan Tribal Council (KTC), Chang Khulei Setshang (CKS), Confederation of Chang Students' Union (CCSU), Chang Baptist Lashong Thangyen (CBLT), Eleutheros Christian Society (ECS), and Eastern Farming Association.

== Education ==
=== Schools ===
- Government Higher Secondary School
- St. John's High School
- Christ King School
- St. Joseph's School
- Thangjem High School
- Chaba School
- St. Xavier School
- St. Anthony School
- Holy Angel School
- Little Flower School
- Akum Imlong School
- Loyem Memorial High School
- Baptist Thangyen School
- Montessori Kids Care School
- Assam Rifles School
- National Institute of Open Schooling
- Holy Cross School Saksi
- Eklavya Model Residential School Saksi
- 3rd Battalion N.A.P School Saksi
- Tulip Residential Academy, 3rd NAP
- Trinity Academy, Tuensang

=== Colleges ===
- Sao Chang College
- Loyem Memorial College
- District Institute of Teachers' Education
- Imlong Theological College Saksi
- Oriental Theological College Yangli
- IGNOU Study Center

== Public utilities ==
Tuensang has a functional 100-bed Civil Hospital which has been upgraded to Regional Diagnostic Center (RDC) but is yet to be operationalised. It has an Agriculture Science Center known as KVK, an undertaking of the Government of India, Badminton Stadium, Town Hall and a Public Ground. The "Longpang Project," a program managed by Eleutheros Christian Society (ECS) in collaboration with government and private agencies, near Hakchang Village, has one health center which runs the only rehabilitation center in the district that takes care of AIDS patients and drug addicts.

== Transportation ==
The National Highways 155 passes through the district, linking Mokokchung (NH-61 junction) and Jessami (NH-150 junction) via Tuensang Town, covering a distance of 342 km. Recently the ongoing work on NH-155 came under severe criticisms from the public led by Eastern Naga Students' Federation for alleged poor workmanship, non-adherence to contract norms by the contractors, and lackadaisical attitude of the Nagaland Public Works Department.
