= Patsho Khiamniungan =

Sino-Tibetan language spoken in India

- pɑ³³tsʰɒ⁵⁵
- Pronunciation: Khiamniungan Naga pronunciation: [/pɑ³³tsʰɒ⁵⁵ kʰiɑm³³ɲu⁵⁵ŋn⁵⁵/]
- Native to: India
- Region: Noklak District, Nagaland
- Ethnicity: Khiamniungan Naga
- Native speakers: 120,000 approx. in Myanmar and 61,983 approx (2011)
- Language family: Sino-Tibetan: Brahmaputran; Konyak; Konyak–Chang; Khiamniungic; Khiamniungan; South Khiamniungan Naga; Patsho Khiamniungan

Language codes
- ISO 639-3: kix
- Glottolog: pats1234
- Patsho-speaking region

Patsho Khiamniungan or Khiamniungan is a Sino-Tibetan language spoken in Noklak district in the state of Nagaland, India. It serves as the predominant spoken variety across most Khiamniungan villages.

== Alphabet ==
The Patsho Khiamniungan alphabet consists of the following letters:

Patsho Khiamniungan Alphabet
All caps	A	Ch	E	H	I	J	K	KH	L	M	N	NG	NY	O	P	PH	S	SH	T	TH	TS	TSH	U	Ü	V	W	Y
Capital letters	A	Ch	E	H	I	J	K	Kh	L	M	N	Ng	Ny	O	P	Ph	S	Sh	T	Th	Ts	Tsh	U	Ü	V	w	Y
Small letters	a	ch	e	h	i	j	k	kh	l	m	n	ng	ny	o	p	ph	s	sh	t	th	ts	tsh	u	ü	v	w	y
IPA	a a̯	tʃʰ	e ɛ ɛ̯	h	i i̯ ɪ̯ ɪ	tʃ	k	kʰ	l	m	n	ŋ	ɲ	o o̯ ɔ̯ ɔ	p	pʰ	ʃ	ʃʰ	t	tʰ	ts	tsʰ	u ʊ u̯ ʊ̯	ə ɜ̯	v	w	j

This makes for 27 letters in Patsho Khiamniungan.

== Background ==
Patsho denotes both an indigenous Tibeto-Burman language of the Kuki-Chin-Naga cluster and its associated ethnolinguistic community, primarily centered in eastern Nagaland, India. The term exhibits referential polysemy: it functions as a toponym for Patsho Village—a high-population settlement in Noklak District serving as the community’s cultural heartland; a demonym for the village-originating ethnic group; and a glossonym for their native tongue. While the village anchors Patsho identity geographically and demographically, the label extends secondarily to diaspora populations maintaining linguistic and cultural ties to this nucleus.

== Typology ==
Patsho Khiamniungan is a Sino-Tibetan, compound of two words. Patsho is a village in Nagaland and Khiamniungan refers to one of the major tribes in Nagaland.

== Phonology ==
The phonological inventory of Patsho Khiamniungan is as follows:

Consonants
	labial/ labiodental	dental	palatal/ palato-alveolar	velar	glottal
stop, unasiprated	p	t		k	ʔ
stop, aspirated	pʰ	tʰ		kʰ	
affricate, unaspirated		ts	tʃ		
affricate, aspirated		tsʰ	tʃʰ		
nasal	m	n	ɲ	ŋ	
fricative	(v)	s	ʃ		
approximant	w	l	j		h

=== Vowels ===
Vowels
a	e	i
o	u	ü

=== Phonemic tones ===
There are four phonemic tones in Patsho,

- high level /55/
- mid level /33/
- high falling /52/
- low /31/

=== Monophthongs ===
	Front	Central	Back
Close	i [ɪ],		u [u], [ʊ],
Mid	e [e], [ɛ],		o [o], [ɔ]
Open	a [ɑ],		ü [ə],

=== Diphthongs ===
Patsho Khiamniungan has the following diphthongs:

Starting with a	Starting with e	Starting with i	Starting with o	Starting with u
ai (/ai/, /ɑːi/ or /ai/)	ei (/eɪ/, /ɛi/ or /ɛɪ/)	ie (/iɛ/)	ou (/ou/)	ui (/ui/)
au (/au/)	eu (/ɛu/, /eʊ/)	iu (/ɪʊ/ or /iu/)	oi (/oi/)	ua (/uɑ/)

=== Triphthongs ===
Patsho Khiamniungan has the following triphthongs:

- iai, as in hiai,
- iau as in hiauh, kiau,
- uai, as in huai,kuai,
- üie, as in khǖîe
- uau, as in liuau,
- uou, as in Tiuou,
- oua, as in touap,

== Grammar ==
=== Case marking ===
- èi sōih-à jǖ-shíu-shī-ê.

1sg.ABS go.away-INF NEG-be.able-RSMPT-IRR

‘I won't be able to go away again.’

(AC4-20170109_KIX1-002)

- ngǖ-ōh yôh nǜ hâkūtî vâuh tèu-nyê.

1SG-ERG pig DEM large rear keep-REAL

I am rearing a large pig

(AC4-20050127_KIX1_001)

- nyǖ-ōh ātsòu èi jūa-ê tə)náihtǖ,

2SG-ERG really 1SG.ABS call-IRR COND

nyǖ-ōh ā-jāmsǖkōuh mèi-kǖ ā-hīe.

2SG-ERG 2SG.POSS-household good-SIM IMP-make

If you really plan to call me (to marry), then you set your

==== Conjugation ====
The verbs are not conjugated as in languages such as English and French by changing the desinence of words, but the tense (in a sentence) is clarified by the aspect and the addition of some particles, such as

- -e (Irrealis mood suffix -encoding a hypothetical or predicted situation. ),

For example: Ei phu-e/I will come

- nye (Realis mood - used to encode actualized events and states),

For example: Ei khu nye/I went

- -shī (resumptive aspect-nominal suffix),

For example: Lü khushi/go again(lü-imperative prefix/mood)(authoritative command)

- nyü (Prohibitive mood),

For example: Nyü khu/Don't go

- ie (nominal suffix. reciprocal suffix),

For example: Nyü vei-ie/Don't fight

==== Pluralisation ====
Nouns are pluralized by suffixing -hoi, for example:

Noun	Plurals	Meaning
Khèunyòh Mīetshōu Jāmkèi	Khèunyòhhōi; Mīetshōuhói; Jāmkèihōi	khēunyòh – human hoi-beings or group/mīetshōuhói – kids or children/jāmkèihōi- vehicles

==== Negation ====
For declarative sentences, negation is achieved by adding the particle jü (not) in the beginning or middle of a sentence. For example,

Sentence	Negation	
Làmnyù shî jē Lamnyu is coming	Làmnyù jǖshî Lamnyu did not come	
Sǖmīeh nòng òh lǖvòk nǜ tsīe-īe jé Three divides six	Sǖmīeh nòng òh lǖvòk nǜ jǖtsīe-īe jé Three does not divide six	
Làmnyù shî jē Lamnyu is coming	jǖshî Làmnyù tō Lamnyu is not coming	-

=== Replication and transfer(cognitive schemas) ===
(1).

- “Standard” Nagamese (Indo-Aryan):

kana hik-i-bole song learn-EP-INF6

‘to learn a song’

- Patsho Khiamniungan (Konyakian):

tsūihāng līam-ā song search-INF

‘to learn a song’

- Nagamese of Patsho Khiamniungan speakersː

kana pisar-i-bole song search-EP-INF

‘to learn a song

(2)

- Mongsen Ao (Indo-Burmic):

tāŋ%āɹ tʃū nə) tə)-pāʔ khə) tə)-jā nə)t other DIST AGT RL-father CONJ RL-mother two tāŋ tʃū nə) wā-ə+ɹ, SIDE DIST ALL go-SEQ

‘Others went to the mother and father,…’

(lit. to the mother and father's side), (Coupe 2017, p. 290)

- Patsho Khiamniungan (Konyakian):

lōhō mīe-nyù nǖ tōŋ-lè khù-shī-nyè. again girl-F DEM SIDE-LOC go-RPET-REAL

‘Again he went to the girl.’ (lit. … to the girl's side’)

== Syntax ==
Patsho Khiamniungan is a tonal, agglutinative and SOV language with postpositions. Adjectives, numerals and demonstratives comes after the nouns they modify, whilst relative clauses may be either externally or internally headed. Interrogative such as ateitsoh? appears after the noun or subject but the word mou? usually comes at the end, transforming the sentence into question.

- Example of interrogative?

Khèunyòh ātēitsǖh kì jē kòu nī?
How many of you lives here?

Nyǜ-òh Khǖnū hàu chái nǘ kìuhvà môu?
Did you give the money to Khünu?

- Example of numeral

Jǖsǖ jāmkhèu kò, khèunyòh mǖngōu jé.
There are five siblings in our family.

- Example of noun

Jām nòng lǖ/lē hàkǜtî.
hàkǜtî lē, jām nō.
This house is very big.

Āté lǘ nô hàkǜtî nò?
hàkǜtî nǜ ātéi lǘ nô?
Where is the big/large one?

Mīeshēu Làmnyù lāhkǖtî jē.
lāhkǖtî jē Làmnyù tō.
Miss Lamnyu is very tall.

- Example of demonstrative

Demonstratives seems to appear either before noun or after, shown by the example given below.

Jǖnòu jē nòng nī.
Nòng nī Jǖnòu jē.
This is my sister.

== Language development ==
It has undergone systematic orthographic development using the Latin script, resulting in published standardized writing conventions. This orthography serves as a foundation for pedagogical resources (e.g., primers, grammatical descriptions) and a lexicographic corpus (notably a descriptive dictionary), collectively constituting a language documentation and revitalization framework.

== Writing system ==
The Patsho Khiamniungan orthography employs a Latin-based script comprising twenty-seven graphemes. This system exhibits shallow orthographic depth, with grapheme-phoneme correspondences maintained through both monographic and multigraphic representations. Crucially, multigraphs function as single orthographic units despite comprising multiple glyphs: Basic Latin characters (e.g., t,s,h) represent distinct phonemes as monographs. The trigraph <tsh>, constitutes a single complex grapheme, representing a unitary phoneme (likely a voiceless alveolar affricate with aspiration /tsʰ/). In Khiamniungan Naga, the phonemic value of the letter h varies by position. It is not realized as a glottal when it occurs medially or elsewhere within the body of a word. However, word-final h consistently represents a glottal articulation.

== Sample texts ==
The following is a sample text in Patsho Khiamniungan of Article 1 of the Universal Declaration of Human Rights: or

Patsho Khiamniungan	English
Khèunyòh tshòu ápèm môngthàhkǖ kīhìe-à nǜhè āví nǖ kòu tshàh nyē. Āshèuh nòng ālìanghìe à shīukô nǜhè ātshǖmûajǖn nǖ kòu òk kìuh nyè. Nòngtèiphìe, tsāk héi tsāk ājūjīe ā-îekǜ nǜhè têisǜnîu tǜ kīhìe à āpōutíng nòi nyē.	All human beings are born free and equal in dignity and rights. They are endowed with reason and conscience. Therefore, they should act towards one another in a spirit of brotherhood.

== Basic vocabulary ==
Patsho Khiamniungan	English
Thēumêi	Thank You
Āmêi hǜnī?	How are you?
Āmêi.	I am fine.
Khìam	Water
Tshīh	(cooked) rice
Ngòuh nyèih	fish (meat)
Vèu nyèih	chicken (meat)
Yōh nyèih	pork (meat)
Jâng nyèih	beef (meat)
Ūo nyèih	mutton (meat)
Kīe nyèih-kìe/sāngô)	dish (meat/vegetable)
Sāng-ô (kīesāngô)	vegetable
Nāgā chǖ-ùm	lentils
Tsēm	salt
Lūtsôutsòh (Chauchau ko)	less
Pǖ-ìuh	chilli
Jūjīelīankó āshūa kìuhshī	Please give again (serve again).
Têitsòh	enough
Khìam nǜ āshêu kìuh.	Please give water.
Tsīh nü ākhém kíuh.	Please give food (rice).
Jūjīelīangkó kîemāu nǖhéikǖ ākīuh.	Please give (side dish) vegetable / meat.
ātéi yèuh jē?	What do you want?
Atéi?	What?
Āvàih? Ātéi nāi-òh?	When?
Ātéi lé?	Where?
Ātéi ālì?	How?
Āshēu āmēi.	Good Night.
Shīemông lǜ āléu óh phù jè?	How do I go to Shiemong?
Nòngnī ātēitsǜh mâi nò?	What is the price of this?
Mêikǖ lǜ-īu.	Happy journey.
mônglīngkǖ lǖnôi.	Stay happy.

=== Numbers in Patsho ===
Numerals	Hauvi	Tone(Shangliak)	IPA
0	wa	wà	wa³¹
1	tsak	tsāk	tsak³³
2	lümih	lǖmīeh	lə³³.mɪʔ³³
3	sümieh	sǖmīeh	sə³³.mɪəʔ³³
4	pülie	pǖlīe	pə³³.lɪə³³
5	müngou	mǖngōu	mə³³.ŋɒu³³
6	lüvok	lǖvòk	lə³³.vɒk³³
7	tshünyieh	tshūnyìeh	tsʰə³³.ɲɪɛʔ³³
8	püjeih	pǖjèih	pə³³.tʃɛʔ³³
9	lükau	lǖkàu	lə³³.kɒu³³
10	tshie	tshìe	tsʰɪɛ³³
20	khei	khèi	kʰɛɪ³¹
30	ausam	āusám	ɑu³³sɑm⁵⁵
40	aupülie	àupǜlīe	au̯³¹pə³¹liɛ̯³³
50	aumüngou	àumǜngōu	au̯³¹məŋ³¹ou̯³³
60	aulüvok	àulǜvòk	au̯³¹lə³¹vok³²
70	autshienyieh	àutshǜnyìeh	au̯³¹tsʰə³¹ɲiɛ̯ʔ³²
80	aupüjeh	àupǜjèih	au̯³¹pə³¹tʃɛi̯ʔ³²
90	aulükau	àulǜkàu	au̯³¹lə³¹lau̯³¹
100	tsum tsak	tsūm tsāk	tsum³³.tsak³³
200	tsum lümieh	tsūm lǖmīeh	tsum³³.lə³³ mɪʔ³³
300	tsum sümieh	tsūm sǖmīeh	tsum³³.sə³³ mɪəʔ³³
400	tsum pülie	tsūm pǖlīe	tsum³³.pə³³.lɪə³³
500	tsum müngou	tsūm mǖngōu	tsum³³.mə³³.ŋɒu³³
600	tsum lüvok	tsūm lǖvòk	tsum³³.lə³³.vɒk³³
700	tsum tshünyieh	tsūm tshūnyìeh	tsum³³.tsʰə³³.ɲɪɛʔ³³
800	tsum püjeih	tsūm pǖjèih	tsum³³. pə³³.tʃɛʔ³³
900	tsum lükau	tsūm lǖkàu	tsum³³.lə³³.kɒu³³
1000	ka tsak	ká tsāk	ka⁵⁵.tsak³³
10,000	ka tshie	ká tshīe	ka⁵⁵.tsʰɪɛ³³
100,000	tsang tsak	tsāng tsāk	tsaŋ³³.tsak³³
10000000	pei tsak	péi tsāk	pei⁵⁵.tsak³³
1000000000	iuh tsak	ìuh tsāk	iuʔ³¹.tsak³³
100000000000	em tsak	ēm tsāk	em³³.tsak³³

== See also ==
- Khiamniungan language
- Khiamniungan people
- Patsho
- Nütsah
- Phie
- Pou
- Mount Khülio-King
