= Noklak district =

Coordinates: 26.2167°N 94.9919°E

- District of Nagaland
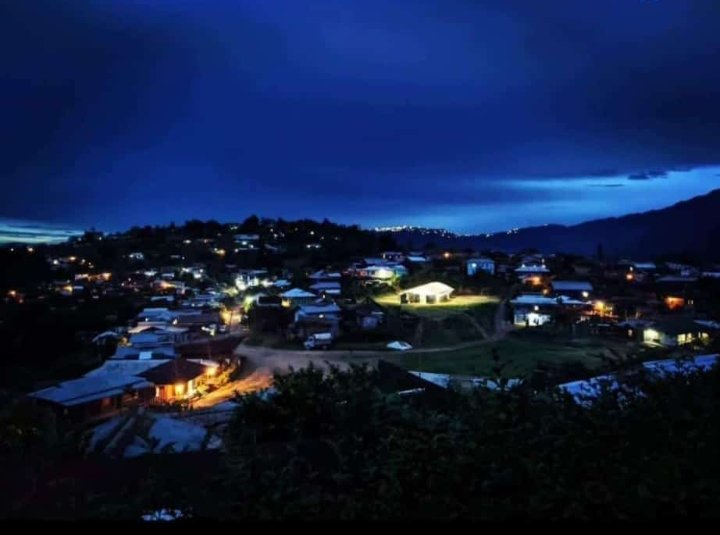
- Patsho village
- Nickname: The Frontier District
- Noklak District in Nagaland
- Country: India
- State: Nagaland
- Headquarters: Noklak

Government
  - Lok Sabha Constituency: Nagaland
  - MP: Tokheho Yepthomi, NDPP
  - Deputy Commissioner: Hiazu Meru (NCS)
  - Assembly constituencies: 3 constituencies

Area
  - Total: 1,152 km^{2} (445 sq mi)

Population (2011)
  - Total: 59,300
  - Density: 51.5/km^{2} (133/sq mi)
- Time zone: UTC+05:30 (IST)
- Website: noklak.nic.in

Noklak district is the 12th district of the Indian state of Nagaland. It was established on January 20, 2021. Noklak, the eponymous town, is the headquarters of the district.

== History ==
Noklak district was created on 21 December 2017 as the 12th district of Nagaland. The new district has the same boundaries as the former Noklak sub-division of Tuensang district. Noklak sub-division contained the five admin circles of Noklak, Thonoknyu, Nokhu, Panso and Chingmei.

Demands for upgrading the ADC office in Noklak town had been made by the Eastern Nagaland Peoples' Organisation (ENPO) in 2008.

== Geography ==
Noklak district covers an area of 1,152 km^{2}. Noklak district is a hilly region, with broad leaved forests. It is bordered by Mon district to the north, Tuensang and Shamator districts to the west, Kiphire district to the south and the Naga SAZ of Sagaing Region of Myanmar to the east. The climate is sub-tropical with a monsoon season.

== Administration ==
The district covers five taluks (administrative circles), which are Noklak, Thonoknyu, Nokhu, Panso and Chingmei. While a subdivision of Tuensang, an Additional Deputy Commissioner (ADC) office was located in Noklak circle, a Sub-Divisional Officer (SDO) was located in Thonoknyu circle, and Extra Assistant Commissioner EAC headquarters were located in Nokhu, Panso and Chingmei circles.

There are also police stations in Noklak and Panso Headquarters and a police outpost at Thonoknyu.

Noklak district contains three rural development blocks (RD blocks), which are Noklak, covering Noklak, Nokhu, and Chingmei taluks, Panso RDB covering Panso taluk and Thonoknyu RDB covering Thonoknyu taluk.

The district has two seats in the state legislature.

Dr. Pritpal Kaur, IPS assumed charge as the first Superintendent of Police of Noklak District which is Nagaland's youngest district and the last district that borders Myanmar.

== Demographics ==
According to the 2011 census of India, the present population of Noklak district is 59,300. Nokhu, Noklak, Panso, Chingmei and Thonoknyu subdivisions are parts of the present Noklak district. Noklak district has a sex ratio of 922 females per 1000 males. Scheduled Tribes make up 57,868 (97.59%) of the population.

Christianity is the religion of 99.07% of the inhabitants. Other religions followed are Hinduism by 0.4% of the population, Islam by 0.3%, Buddhism by 0.2%, and a few Sikhs.

At the time of the 2011 census, 90.59% of the population spoke Khiamniungan, 6.18% Chang and 1.69% Tikhir as their first language.

=== Towns and villages ===
As of 2011, the 2011 census the erstwhile sub-division held 39 villages, spread over four administrative circles as follows:

Circle	Population	Area km^{2}	Villages	Source
Noklak	19,507	164.92	Noklak HQ (7,674), Noklak Village (4,205), New Pangsha (2,575), Nokyan (1,542), Old Pangsha (1,121), Wansoi (924), Pang (674), Dan (636), Kusong (467), Nokyan B (363).	
Thonoknyu	18,600	491.36	Sanglao (3,881), Peshu (3,447), Chipur (2,973), Thonoknyu Hq (1,485), Pang (1,174), Kenjong (1,035), Thonoknyu Vill. (923), Chilliso (839), Thoktsur (757), Wui (756), New Sanglao (331), Thongsonyu (296), Thongtsou (239), Jejeiking (238), Peshu Nokya (226).	
Nokhu	6,291	218.94	Choklangan (2,027), Nokhu (1,875), Langnok (1,307), Aniashu (568), Nokhu Hq. (306), Kingpao (148), Kenking (60).	
Panso	11,036	148.33	Pathso Nokeng (2,880), Pathso (2,117), Lengnyu (1,255), Yokao (1,083), Panso Hq (1,063), Kingniu (1,026), Tsuwao (901), Ekhao (390), Tsangkoi (213), Lumoking (108).	
Chingmei	3,866	128.79	Chingmei (1,685), Chendang Saddle (801), Waoshu (512), Yimpang (387), Taknyu (309), Chingmei Hq. (172)	
Total	59,300	1,152		

== Transportation ==
=== Air ===
The nearest airport is Jorhat Airport in Assam located 250 kilometres from district headquarters Noklak. There is a helipad in Noklak as well.

=== Rail ===
The nearest railway stations are Amguri railway station and Jorhat Town railway station located 206 kilometres and 243 kilometres from Noklak respectively.

=== Road ===
The district is connected with roads. The Noklak Road passes through the district alongside other intra-district roads. The NH 202 and NH 702B are the nearest highways to the district. Both the highways pass through Tuensang.

== See also ==
- Patsho
- Noklak
- Tuensang
- Nagaland
