= Noklak =

- Town
- Location in Nagaland, India
- Coordinates: 26.2054795°N 95.0150685°E
- Country: India
- State: Nagaland
- District: Noklak

Government
  - Body: Nagar Palika

Population (2011)
  - Total: 7,674

Languages
  - Official: English
- Time zone: UTC+5:30 (IST)
- Vehicle registration: NL
- Website: nagaland.gov.in

Noklak is the headquarters of the Noklak district. The district was officially inaugurated by the Nagaland's Chief Minister, Neiphiu Rio, on January 20, 2021, and is located in the easternmost part of India. Noklak district is the headquarters of the Khiamniungan Nagas in the Indian state of Nagaland.

Noklak is one of the most popular tourist attractions owing to its gamut of tribal festivities. This North-Eastern village offers a great view of the mountains and vales of the Himalayan Range. It has recently become quite popular amidst tourists and is filled with tribesmen and their cultures and ancient traditions. This village is quite modernized on one hand and global education has reached the corners of Noklak which helps the tribesmen learn the global language of English and communicate with the tourists fluently. The Khiamniungan tribe are the prime inhabitants of this village and they are widely known for their cane work, handicrafts and artefacts.

== History ==
Noklak district was created on 21 December 2017 as the 12th district of Nagaland. The new district has the same boundaries as the former Noklak sub-division of Tuensang district. Noklak sub-division contained the five admin circles of Noklak, Thonoknyu, Nokhu, Panso and Chingmei.

Demands for upgrading the ADC office in Noklak town had been made by the Eastern Nagaland Peoples' Organisation in 2008.

== Demographics ==
As per the 2021 Aadhar estimates, Noklak District population in 2021 is 24,189. According to 2011 census of India, Total Noklak population is 19,507 people are living in this Subdivision, of which 10,066 are male and 9,441 are female. Population of Noklak in 2020 is 23,408 Literate people are 11,979 out of 6,360 are male and 5,619 are female. Total workers are 9,785 depends on multi skills out of which 5,086 are men and 4,699 are women. Total 6,143 Cultivators are depended on agriculture farming out of 2,876 are cultivated by men and 3,267 are women. 50 people works in agricultural land as a labour in Noklak, men are 27 and 23 are women.

== Administration ==
The head of the administration is the office of Deputy Commissioner and Superintendent of Police.
