= Khiamniungan folk dances =

- Langnyu Khiamjangje: Performs during Miu & Tsoukum Festivals
- Jāmhàng: Feast of merit Dance
- Hòi-ìe-tsûi: Performs during Tsoukum
- Shāpāutāithíu: Welcome Dance or Warm reception dance
- Khèulàk: Performs on the eve of war
- Nòknàp-ìe-tsùikūap: Peace Treaty Reception Dance
- Shīkūoh: Vigorious male dance
- Tsūichōng/hūonèu dance: Pre-war dance
- ī-lī-tsùihāng: war dance or victory dance
- Khāuhtsāusîe dance: Performs during Khāuhtsāusîe festival

Short version of Patsho folk dance at Shiemong Circus.

Hangtui- Khiamniungan women folk dance at Shiemong Circus.

Tsuikuap (i.e. folk dance) of the Khiamniungan is not just singing and dancing but deeply rooted to cultural identity and contains deep meaning. It is done fully dressed with traditional clothing like Ahangküha, spears, Dao, shield etc.

== List of Khiamniungan folk dances ==
Langnyu-Khiamjangje (Langnyu-Khiamtsangshe) dance is a traditional folk dance performed by the Khiamniungan Naga tribe of Nagaland during two of their most important festivals i.e. Miu and Tsoukum, which are co-related to each other.

Jamhang(Jamhang Tsouthong) Dance: The ‘Jamhang’ is a 'Feast of Merit' dance of ‘Khiamniungan’ tribe of Nagaland. It is also one of the major tribal dances of north east India.

Hoi-ie-tsui (Ho-e-tsui) : post-harvesting feast usually performs during Tsoukum festival in the month of October each year.

Shapautaithiu Dance : Traditional welcome dance to any social occasions. This dance is perform moving backward while the Shapau(Chief guest) is following them facing the dance group.

Kheulak: On the eve of every fight, a group of six warriors, donned with combat armour and weapons would perform a dance-like ritual called kheulak at the anterior of the main Morung. They do this as a vow or pledge to kill the enemies in war by keeping the Dao(Naga national Sword) on the ground in front of them and jump with temerity and courageous behavior.

Noknap-ie-tsuikuap (Noknapizuinuap) (Peace Treaty Reception Dance)The peace treaty between villages is usually carried out in the month of January when the village folks are free from jhum cultivation. The ceremony is done with the mutual desire of villages to end hostilities and bring about friendship and peaceful coexistence.

Shikuoh (War Dance): A fearless male dance replication of war with fighting tools wandering around shouting giving out battle cry to keep the village safe from enemy's attack.

Tsuichong/huoneu There is also a Pre-war Dance called Tsouchong. This dance is performed by every able-bodied man, preparing to go for war. Here, their movements depict the fierce behavior of tigers, bears and other wild animals when roused to anger. Giving out high pitched shouts and yells, they psych themselves up for the battle ahead.

I-li-tsuihang (ElieZuihang): which means victory Dance. This dance signifies victory and strength. During the head hunting days, cutting of an enemy's head was considered an important trophy of war and proof of bravery. On returning to the village after a successful war raid, the enemy's head is taken to the morung and the I-li-tsuihang dance is performed with vigor, thereby their resolve to strengthen and defend their village is renewed.

Khāutsāuhsîe Dance (Dance of Merry Making)This dance is performed during the khāutsāuhsîe Sümai (Khaozaosie-Hok-Ah) festival as an expression of gratitude to the Almighty God (Kōuh-ô) for all the blessings bestowed upon the people. The festival is celebrated in the month of January before the new agricultural cycle begins. The food grains stored in the granaries are used in rituals to thank the Gods and also for feasting. "The song accompanying the dance translates as Come great Barbet bird, let us rejoice together. The mountains are clad in snow which signifies the abundant blessings bestowed upon us."

== See also ==
- Khiamniungan people
- Tsoukum
- Patsho
