= Phie =

Log drum of Nagaland, India

A Phie (/pʰiɛ̯³³/) or sometime spelled Phi before the introduction of Khiamniungan alphabet is a traditional log drum, an integral part of the cultural heritage of the Khiamniungans in Northeastern state of Nagaland, India. These log drums are massive, hollowed-out wooden carvings large enough to accommodate several men sitting inside in a row. Historically, such large xylophones or percussion instruments were not found among other Naga tribes during earlier times.

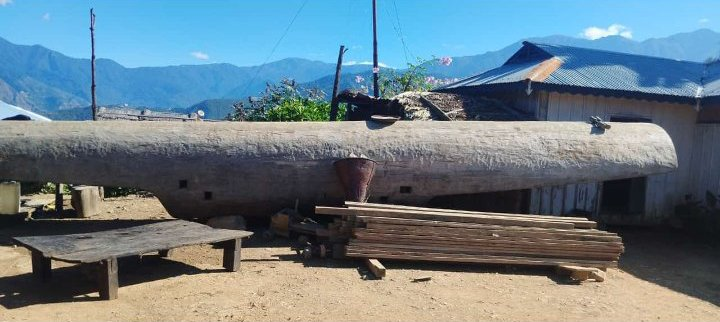
Phie(Logdrum) keeping outside the Pou

== Construction ==
The making of a Phie typically took place far from the village, requiring significant effort, skill, and months of labor to complete. Once finished, the entire male population of the village would transport the log drum to the Pou, a community space, where it would be placed against the wall.

== Significance ==
In traditional Khiamniungan society, the Phie served as a communication tool. The log drum was beaten in specific rhythms to convey various messages, such as signaling danger, announcing rare or significant events, or warning the presence of enemies. Additionally, the Phie played a role in maintaining vigilance among those engaged in communal duties.

== See also ==
- Nütsah
- Pou
- Tsüngkotepsü
- Naga shawl
