= Nütsah =

Traditional shawl created and woven by Khiamniungans

A Nütsah (/nə³³.tsɑʔ³³/) is a traditional shawl created and woven by Khiamniungans of Noklak district in north-eastern India.The Nütsah, traditionally, could only be worn by the wealthy and warriors who had successfully taken the heads of enemy warriors. In modern times, the right to wear the Nütsah is associated with any male individual in the family as a demonstration of cultural acceptance, signifying ancestral fierceness and a distinctive symbol of the Khiamniungan Naga people.

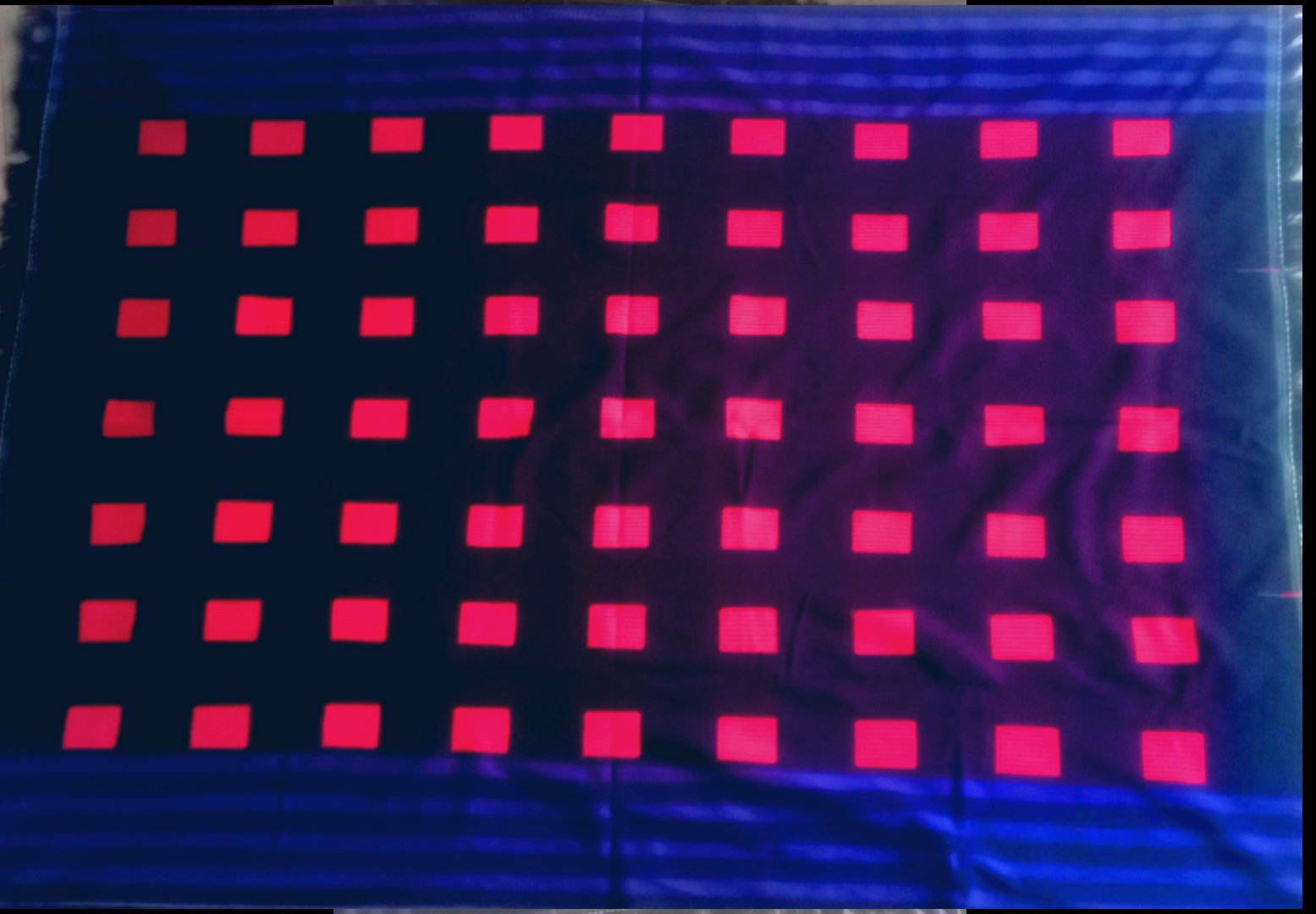
The Nütsah, one of the most important traditional clothing of the Khiamniungans. In fact, it was a part of social ranking in the past

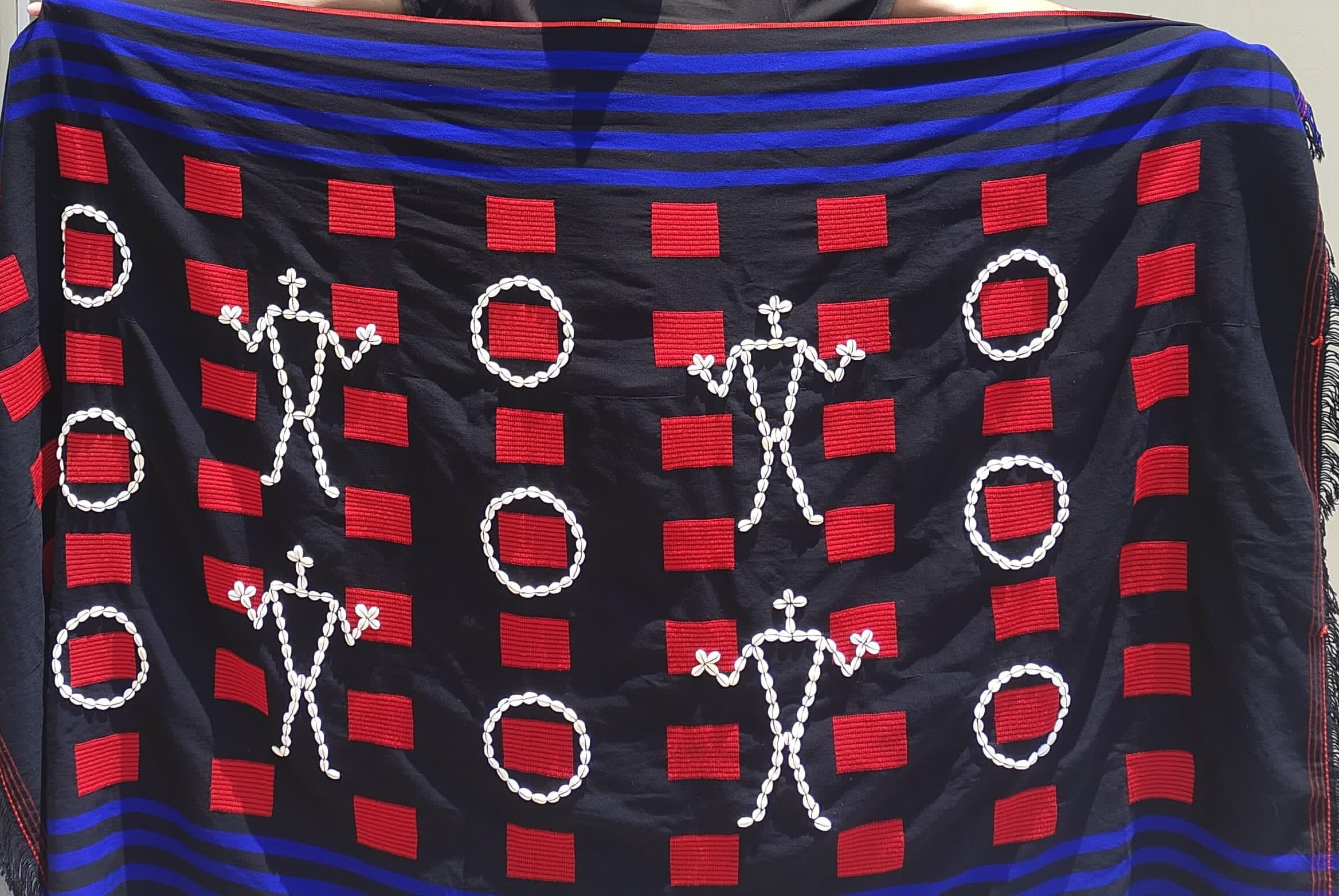
This Shawl which is quite similar to Nütsah is locally called Shiehtsapnie. The only difference is that it has cowrie shells in the form of circular and human figure.

== History ==
In pre-colonial Khiamniungan society, shawls were used to classify the social status of male groups. This prestige symbol is given to higher social status who had earned it by his courageous war-performance putting down many enemies. The Nütsah was considered as the highest-ranking male shawl in ancient Khiamniungan society.

== Design and symbolism ==
The background of the Nütsah is black with intricate design of red square spread across with orange line woven at the edge of all four corners. The Khiamniungan Naga Shawl that has circles of cowrie shells is called Shiehtsap nie. But the exact same shawl without cowrie shells is called Nütsah. The shells was attached as a symbol of feasts of merit which the owner has hosted, depicting the shining stars in the sky during a nightly raid, or the moon and thus female fertility. The huge stylized human figure on the Nütsah indicates the owner's accomplishment in headhunting war. In those days such shawls could only be worn by distinguished accomplished warriors and wealthy men in the society. The red square that has 9x7 red blocks depicts fierce bloody war champion and the blue lines is a symbol of peaceful dominant disposition of all mankind.

== Craft ==
In the traditional Khiamniungan society, a Nütsah was only woven by womenfolk who were practically skilled. It is a time-consuming ordeal and requires sincere devotion and attention to complete the task.

== Cultural impact ==
All other Naga ethnic groups are well known for their shawls, and the Nütsah is the epitome of renowned champion over unique and intricate design. Regardless of ethnic origin, in modern times it can be worn by anyone either indigenous or foreign in consonance with cultural exchanges. But the shawls with cowrie-shell decorations are reserved for distinguished members of society. It is mainly used by cultural troops performing traditional head-hunting dances especially during festivals and events.

== See also ==
- Naga shawl
- Phie
