= Loramhoushü =

- Type: wrap-around skirt
- Place of origin: Naga Hills

Loramhoushü is a traditional shawl of the Angami Nagas. It is a wrap-around skirt worn by women.

== Description ==
The Loramhoushü is typically a white shawl with broad horizontal bands that has black, green and red stripes.

== Weaving ==
Loramhoushü is handwoven on a backstrap loom (loin loom), usually by women. It is woven in narrow strips that are later stitched together.

== See also ==
- Naga shawl
- Lohepfhe
