= Lohepfhe =

- Place of origin: Naga Hills

Lohepfhe also known as Lohekhwe or Lohükhü is a traditional shawl of the Angami Nagas and Chakhesang Nagas. It is traditionally worn by men and is one of the most distinctive Angami and Chakhesang textiles and serves as an important marker of cultural identity.

== Description ==
The Lohepfhe is typically a black shawl with broad horizontal bands of red and green (historically yellow) near the borders.

== Materials and weaving ==
Lohepfhe is handwoven on a backstrap loom (loin loom), usually by women. Historically, it was made from hand-spun cotton and dyed using natural pigments such as indigo and plant-based yellow dyes. Modern versions may use cotton, wool or acrylic yarn.

The shawl is often woven in narrow strips that are later stitched together.

== Cultural significance ==
The Lohepfhe functions as an ethnic and cultural identifier for the Angami people. It is commonly worn during at weddings, formal and cultural events.

== See also ==
- Naga shawl
- Loramhoushü
