= Pou (Khiamniungan dormitory) =

Building with a large traditional log drum kept inside against side wall

The Pou (Morung or dormitory)(/pɒu³³/) is a building with a huge Phie kept inside against the side wall which was primarily the cornerstone and a pivotal institution of the Khiamniungan community throughout early times. Khiamniungans is a tribe that inhabits the easternmost corner of the Indian state of Nagaland.

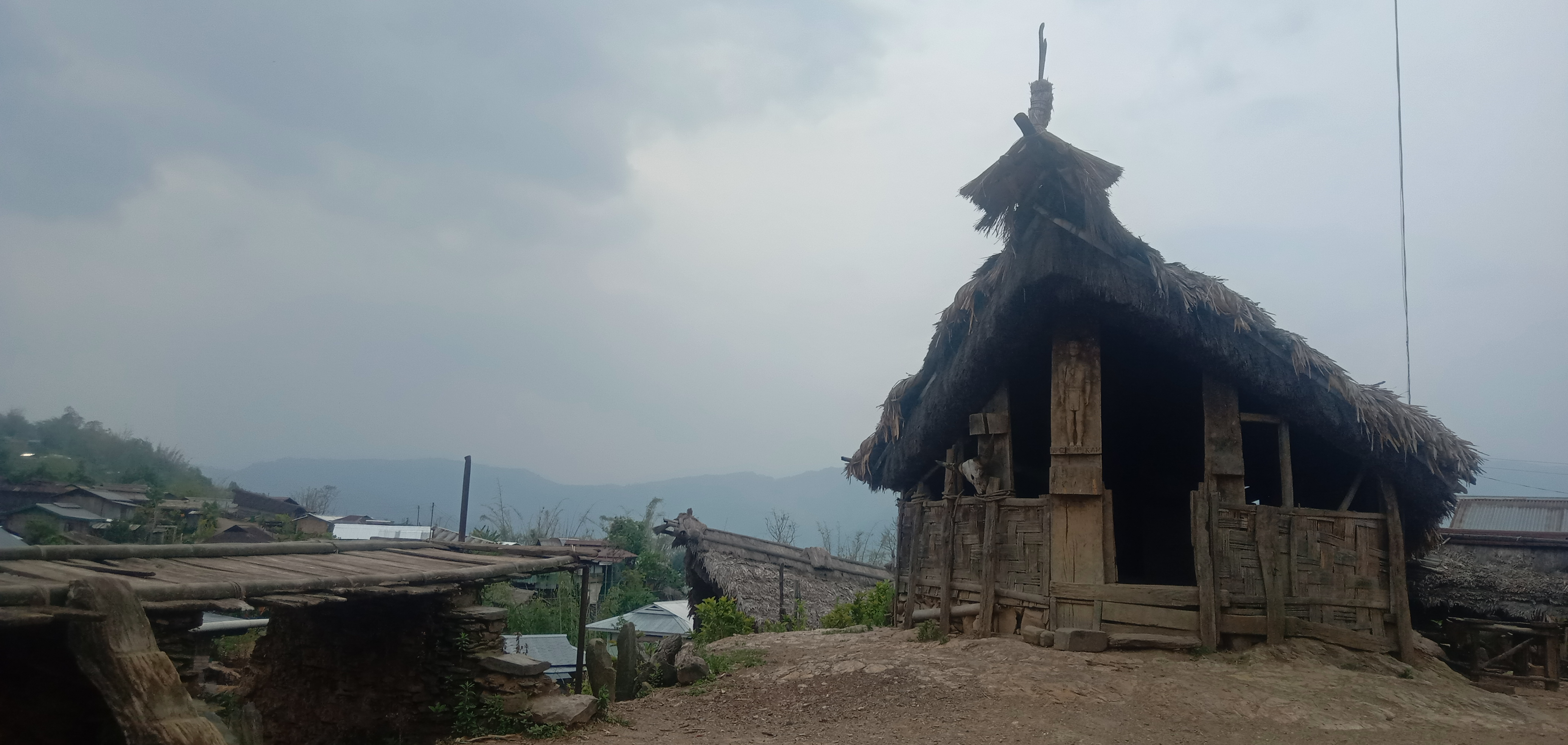
Pou, a youth dormitory.

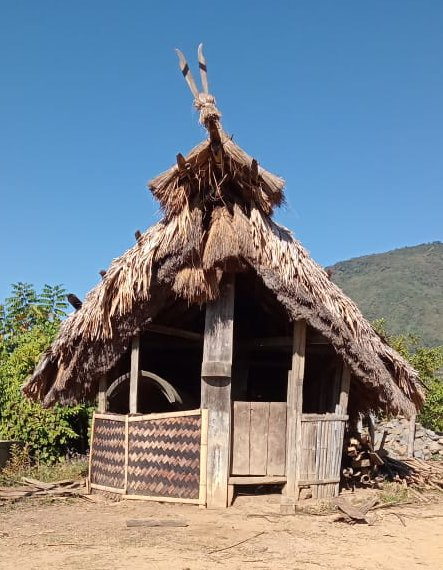
Pou, a youth dormitory

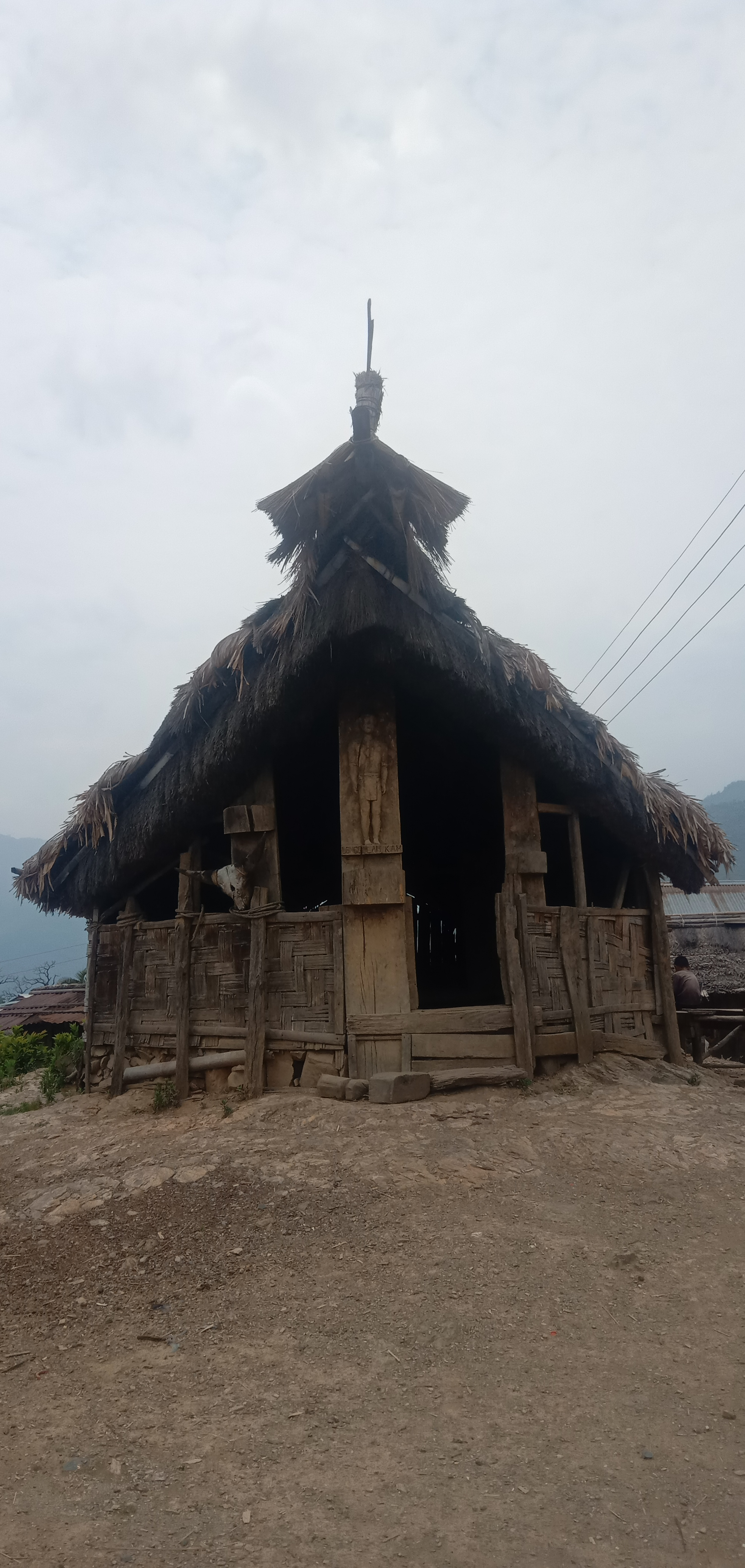
Pou - Khiamniungan dormitory

The Morungs are higher than houses and their roofs rise towards the front in a conical shape.

== History ==
Pou was an important educational and social institution for men in the tribal community, where elders foster patriotism, respect, unity, mutual aid. It was a center of social, religious and political activities. It was also a guard-house.

== Significance ==
Rituals were performed in and outside the Pou, one called Chamtsa. It is also a place where the neck and limbs of animals sacrificed during a festival are collected. During the festival, every male member in the village gathered at their respective khel at a Pou and Uochiu (raised platform in front of every dormitory) celebrating it with feasting and folk dancing.
