= Tsüngkotepsü =

Shawl and textile made in Nagaland

Tsüngkotepsü is a warrior shawl created by the Ao Nagas of Nagaland. Traditionally, the Tsüngkotepsü could only be worn by warriors who had successfully taken the heads of enemy warriors, In modern times, the right to wear the Tsüngkotepsü is associated with performing a mithun sacrifice, a demonstration of wealth and are a distinctive symbol of the Ao Nagas.

== History ==
In pre-colonial Ao society, shawls were used as a marker of social status. The Tsüngkotepsü was the highest-ranking male shawl.

== Design and symbolism ==
The shawl is black and red striped with a single white stripe in the middle containing depictions of animals and other symbols and a brighter red region at the bottom. There are symbols in the white region representing the sun, the moon and the stars, which represent the resulting fame of warriors who wear the shawl. There are also several animals depicted in the strip, which are symbolic of the physical power and the valour of the warrior: a hornbill, a culturally significant bird whose feathers are used for decorative purpose in ceremonial costumes, is often depicted, as are mithun, which represent the wealth of the warrior. (as only wealthier members of the tribe could afford to rear mithun). A spear, dao and cock are common motifs in the section depicting the animals.

The symbols in the white band are sometimes replaced with depictions of mithun, which also represent the wealth and success of the warrior, and there may be elephant and tiger pattern prints on the shawl to symbolise the strength of the warrior.

== Cultural impact ==
Various Naga ethnic groups are well-known for their shawls, and the Tsüngkotepsü is one of the most well-known examples.

=== Every Time You Tell a Story ===
In January 2015, the filmmakers Ruchika Negi and Amit Mahanti produced a documentary about the Tsüngkotepsü titled Every Time You Tell a Story, which aims to document and preserve the cultural tradition surrounding the shawl. The film was screened in March 2017 by the India Foundation for the Arts. The documentary claims to "offer an interpretation of history, a way of understanding the shifts that this shawl-making tradition has experienced when confronted with the certitudes of history – colonialism, new religion and assimilation in the Indian State."

== See also ==
- Naga shawl
