= Ahangküha =

Traditional headgear in Nagaland

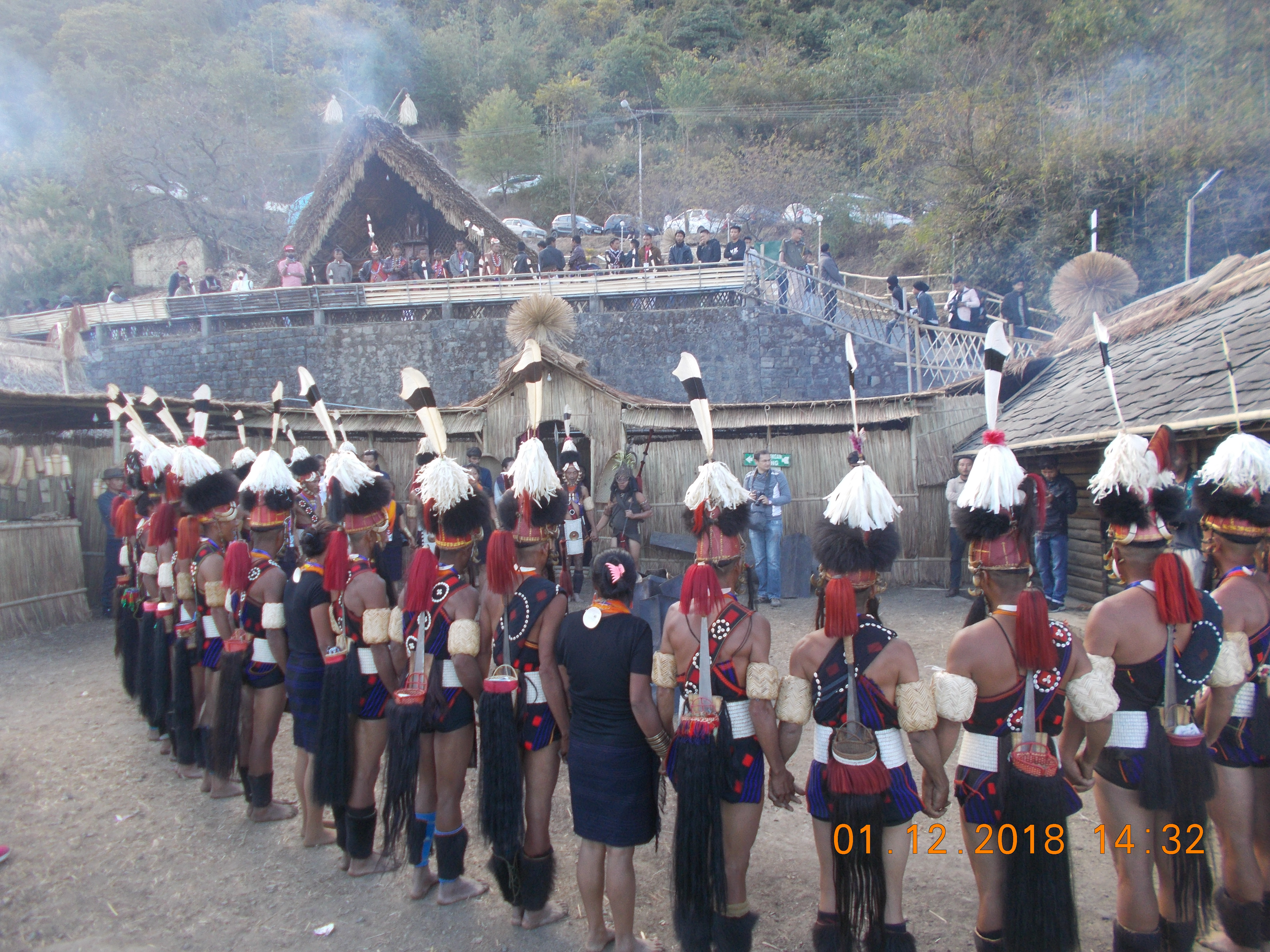
- Type: Headgear
- Place of origin: Nagaland

Ahangküha is a traditional headgear of the Khiamniungans in Nagaland. It is only worn during folkdancing of the regular annual tribal and village festivals.

== History ==
In the olden days such conical hats, leggings (Hokthie), gauntlet etc. were made by the Khiamniungans and traded with other neighbouring communities.

== Craft ==
The frame of the hat is fine cane usually in red colour with red goats' hair and hornbill feathers on top frequently with a chain of tigers' claws that hangs around the chin. Some are decorated with double transparent flat horns on both sides. These are made from mithan's horn.

== Significance ==
The hats are traditionally made using more than twelve materials collected from the wild, each material having historical significance. Authentic headgear is crafted from materials such as tiger claws;wild boar teeth; hornbill feathers, which signifys wealth; and wild goat hair, and bear hair, which collectively signifies immense bravery and victory over enemies. However, now people making the headgear have difficulty in sourcing the raw materials and need to replace them with synthetic ones.

Short version of Patsho folk dance at Shiemong where headgear can be clearly seen

== Gallery ==
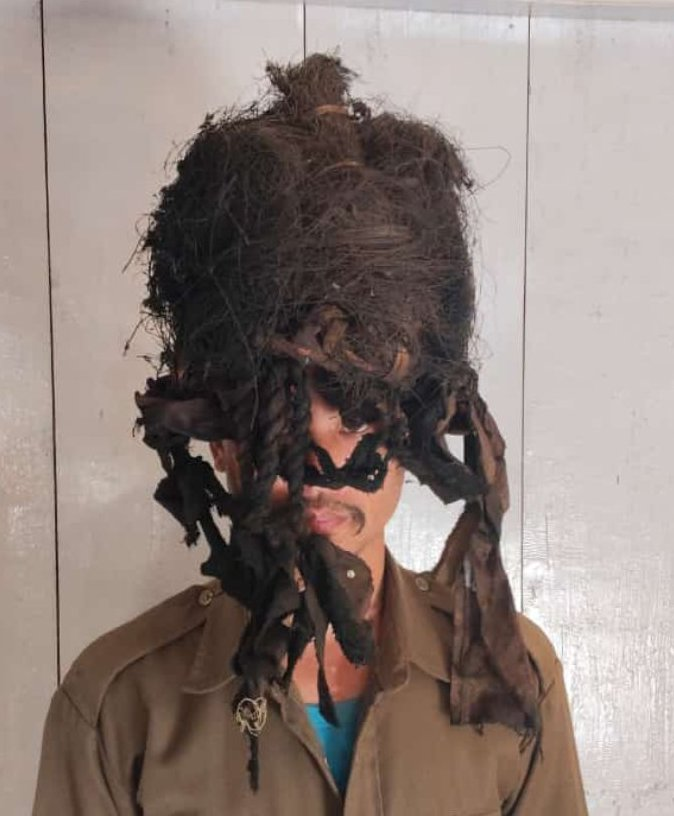

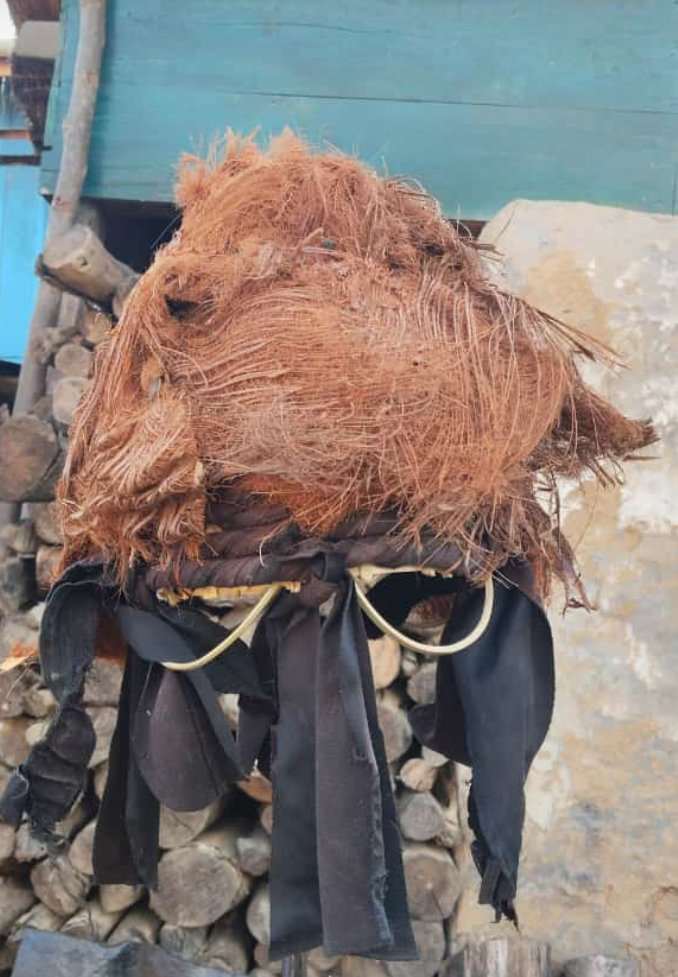

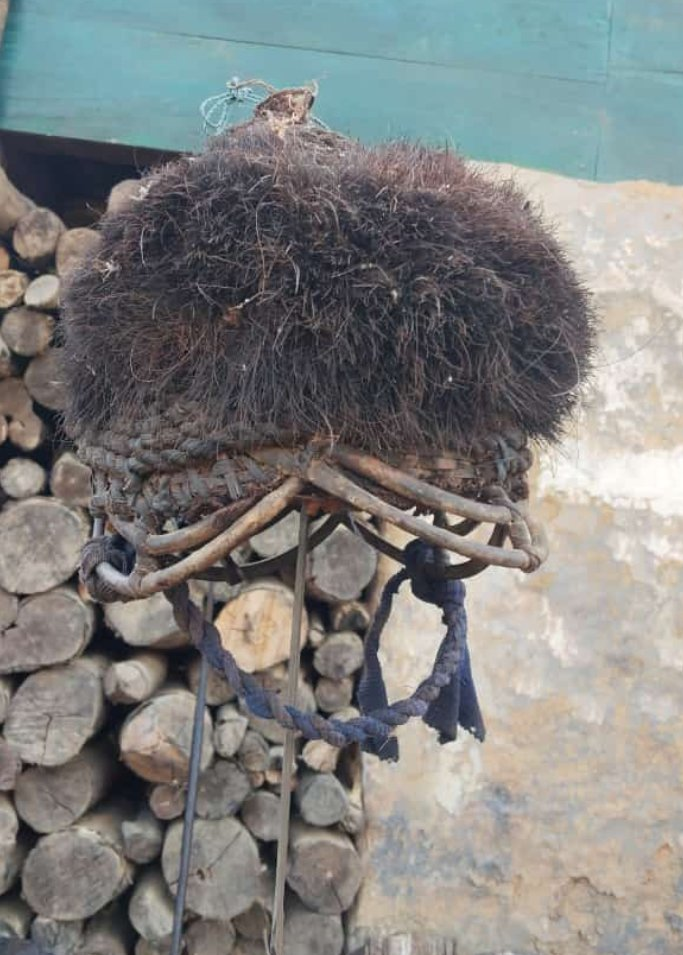
