= Tsoukum =

Khiamniungan festival

Tsokum (orTsukhum) is a post-sowing or pre-harvest festival of the Khiamniungans of Noklak district, in the Indian state of Nagaland. It is celebrated in September each year. This is mainly observed to give thanks to the Almighty Deity for blessing abundant crops and safeguarding the family.

== Sümai ==
Sümai was the festival of dedication to commence the harvest in the jhum field. People harvested their crops after thanking God (Kouh-o) for rich crops during Tsoukum Festival. Today, it is celebrated in the first week of October. During this festival, rituals are performed to invoke bountiful harvest. The community enjoyed sharing of food, meat, and rice beer.

Ampau the village priest announces the date of commencement of Tsoukum festival. The first day of the fest is Sümai-Tsimthau (Sümai Jemthao). Beer is brewed by local women. The second day is called Sümai-Jangkum (Sümai Jangkom), which refers to Mithun searching, dragging and cutting for fest continues that completes on third day. The fourth day is Paipu (Paipiu), collection and bringing of a ceremonial and ritual tree called ‘Memei Pai’ is done on this day. The fifth day is the most significant. The sixth day is called, Janglau (Janglao), The seventh day is Janglau Onou. Tsoukum Sümai concludes on the eighth day, called Emliamliam (Emyamyam).
