= Khiamniungan people =

Naga ethnic group in Myanmar and India

Khiamniungan Naga
Total population
- 120,000 approx. in Myanmar and 61,647 (2011), Nagaland

Languages
- Khiamniungan language

Religion
- 99.07% Christianity

Related ethnic groups
- Naga people

Khiamniungan Nagas are a transnational Naga tribe inhabiting northwestern Myanmar and northeastern India.

== Distribution ==
They inhabit Noklak District in the state of Nagaland, India, and Lahe Township, Htanparkway Sub-Township, Leyshi Township of the Naga Self-Administered Zone and Hkhamti District of the Sagaing Region of Myanmar.

== Etymology ==
The name "Khiamniungan" is derived from the words "Khiam", meaning "Water"; "Niu", meaning "Great"; and "Ngan", meaning "Source". Thus, the term "Khiamniungan" means "Source of great water/river." The name derives from the two largest rivers flowing through the Khiamniungan region: the Zungki River and the Chindwin River in Myanmar.

== Origin ==
The origin of the Khiamniungan people remains uncertain because there are no written records. However, the Khiamniungan people trace their earliest origin to a place called "Khiamniungan Nokthang", which is located below Lengnyu Village–Tsuwao Village, Panso Circle, Noklak District.

== Migration ==
After residing in Khiamniungan Nokthang for generations, the Khiamniungan people gradually migrated in different directions to establish several villages and hamlets. There were four waves of migration:

- Patsho–Peshu group: This group migrated to a place called "Lumoking" and then continued to establish the Patsho Range and the Peshu Range.
- Thang–Wolam group: Likewise, another group migrated to Nokhu Thangsoun and gradually moved north to establish the Thang Range and the Wolam Range.
- Nokhu group: Like the Patsho–Peshu group, the Nokhu group first settled at Lumoking, then moved to Shajaijai, also called Langiu–Mong, before moving to a place known as "Shedkhan", where they established the Nokhu Range.
- Lahe–Leyshi–Hkhamti group: Finally, the last group migrated from Nokhu because of overpopulation, moving eastward toward Lahe, Leshi, and Hkamti. This expansion extended to the northern bank of Jǖhōknyù, or Chuhoongan (the Chindwin River), and beyond in Myanmar.

== History ==
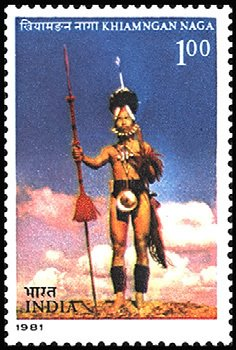
A 1981 India Post stamp of the Khiamniungan Naga.

During the British Raj, the Khiamniungans were referred to as "Kalyo Kenyu" or "Kalyo Kengyu", particularly in the works of anthropologists such as Christoph von Fürer-Haimendorf. Unlike several other Naga tribes, the advent of Christianity had little impact on the Khiamniungan for a long time due to their remote location. The first Khiamniungan to convert to Christianity was Khaming in 1947. Thereafter, a number of Khiamniungans converted to Christianity. Following the introduction of the new education system, social system, modernization, and Christianity, there have been drastic changes in their social life.

== Society ==
The traditional Khiamniungan village had eight important people:

1. Nōkpàu (Village chief/war leader)
2. Pǖtshī or Petche (peace maker, elder)
3. Āmpāu, Müyo, meya (priest)
4. Mūolī-îe (doctor)
5. Ie or Ain (priestess and oracle)
6. Shūalānghái or sonlang (blacksmith)
7. Pāuthéu or Paothai (story teller)
8. Ainloom (the keeper of the supposedly magical stone; the stone is said to warn of any impending disaster, such as a fire or a raid, by moving out of its basket or by creating a sound through striking another object)

By the early 1990s, only the Petche, the Sonlang, and the Ainloom remained relevant, others being remembered mainly as part of books and oral tradition.

== Culture ==
=== Social institution ===
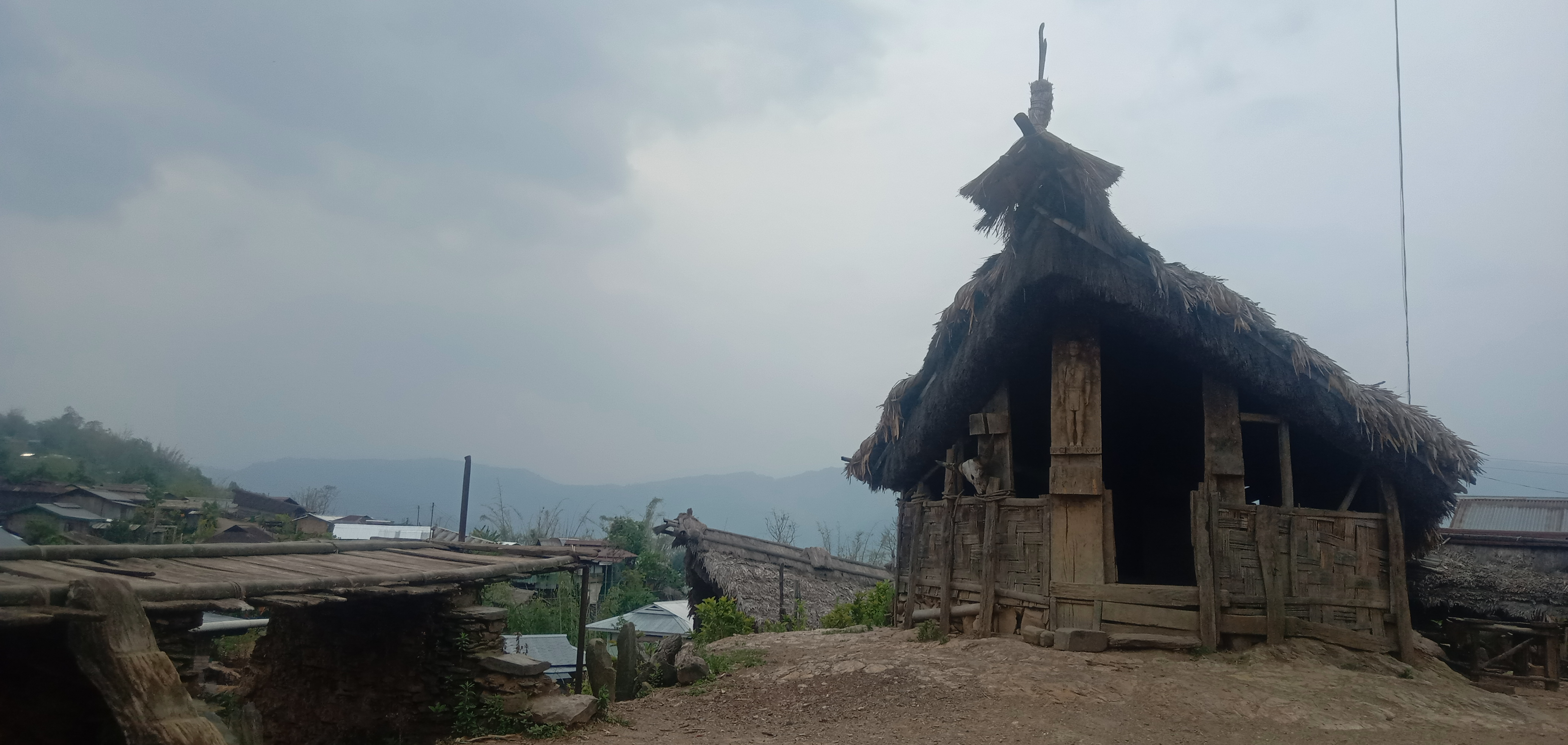
Pou, a dormitory.

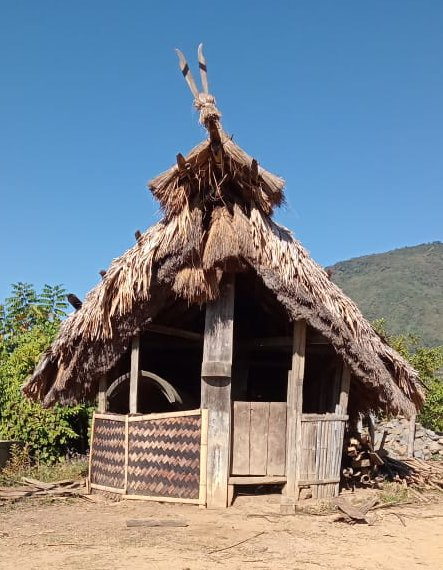
Pou, a dormitory

One of the most important social institutions in the past was the Pou (/pɒu³³/), a grand building with a huge Phie (/pʰie³³/) kept inside against the side wall, which was a cornerstone and pivotal institution of the community in earlier times.

=== Traditional attire ===
The traditional Khiamniungan attire consists of bright red and bright deep blue-colored dresses. The ornaments are made of cowries and conch shells. The most notable ones amongst them are Nütsah(/nə³³.tsɑʔ³³/) and Shietsapnie.

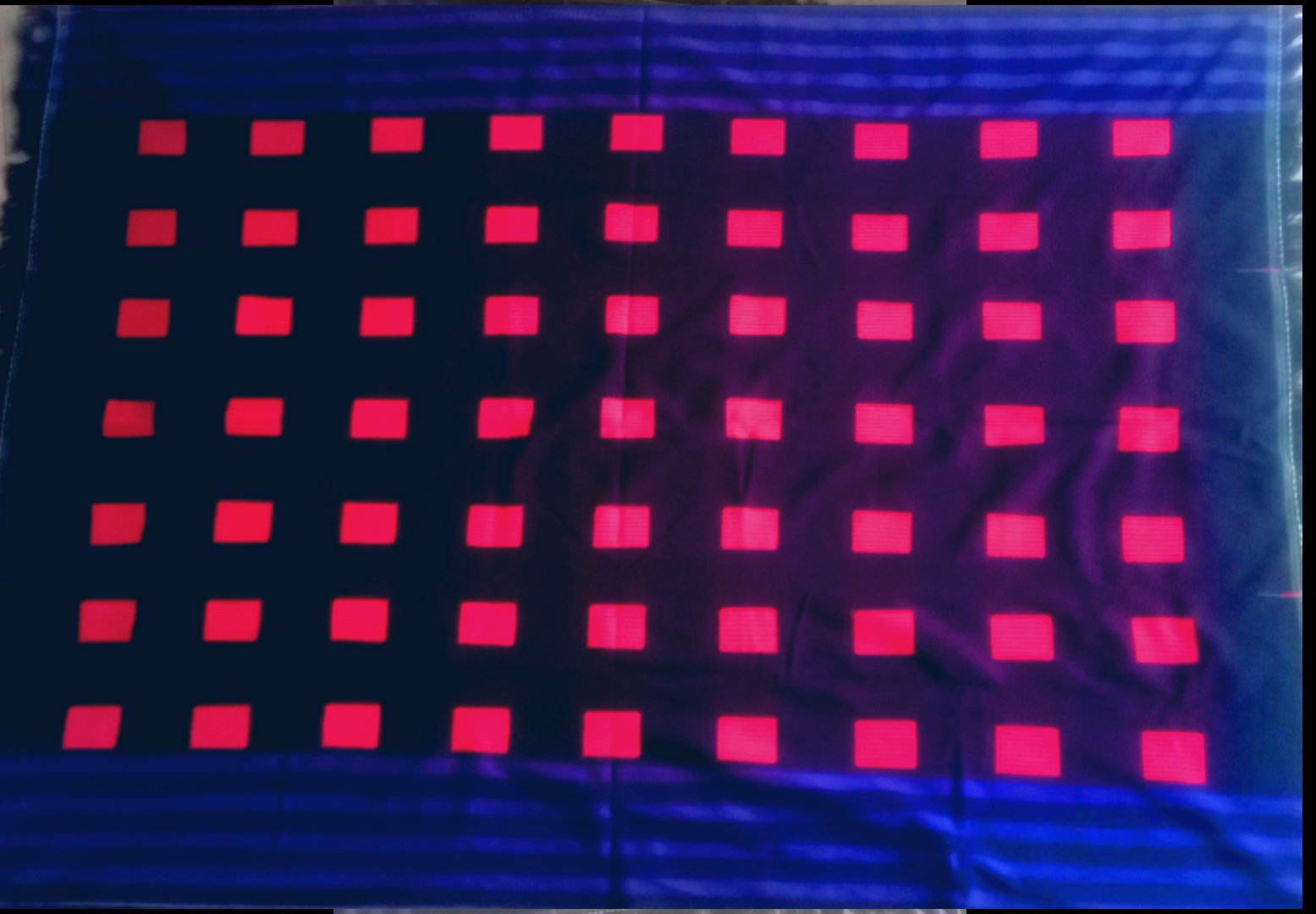
The Nütsah, one of the most important traditional clothing items of the Khiamniungans, was a part of social ranking in the past.

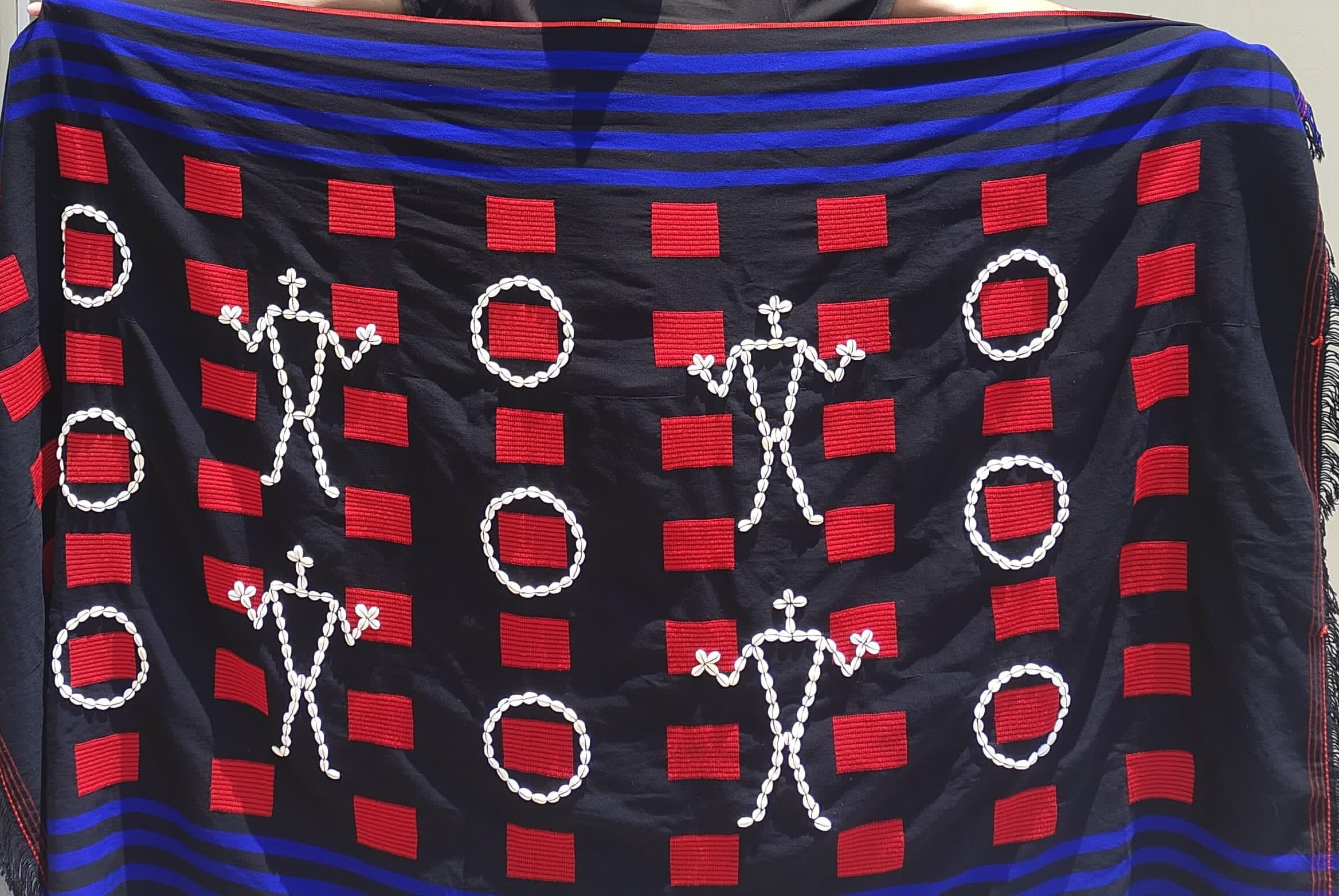
This shawl, which is quite similar to Nütsah, is locally called Shiehtsapnie. The only difference is that it has cowrie shells in the form of a circle and a human figure.

=== Traditional Instruments ===
The ethnic musical instruments include drums made of gourds and bamboo flutes.

=== Language ===
Most of the Khiamniungans in India are acquainted with Patsho Khiamniungan (/pɑ³³.tsʰɒ⁵⁵ kʰiɑm³³.ɲu⁵⁵.ŋn⁵⁵/), which is also one of the main languages in their geographical region.

=== Khaozaosey-Hok-Ah ===
The Khaozaosey-Hok-Ah or Khautsauhsie festival is celebrated annually in the third week of January. The word khaozao means "bamboo cup with a straw pipe", sey means "brew of local wine", hok means "legs", and ah means "to rest".

The festival is about rest and celebration with a local brew and signifies restoration of peace between villagers.

=== Miu Sumai ===
Miu is observed on 5 May every year. The festival is celebrated by the entire community with enthusiasm.

Significance

- The sowing of seeds involves offering prayers, rituals, and ceremonies to appease the gods for the protection of crops.
- The festival marks the end of the merrymaking season and the beginning of the agricultural season.
- To build a cordial relationship and forge a close-knit relationship between the maternal uncle and his sister's offspring—nephews and nieces.

=== Tsoukum Sumai ===
Tsoukum is the week-long harvest festival celebrated in October. The festival includes dancing, singing, cleaning, repairing roads, and outdoor cooking and eating. It is celebrated to offer prayers and invoke God's blessing for a bountiful harvest.

=== Seisei-ie ===
Wordplay or puns are among the unique cultural practices of the Khiamniungans since the inception of the villages. Traditionally, it was performed between villages as a competition, unlike today's practice of performing for entertainment purposes.

== See also ==
- Noklak
- Nagaland
- India
