= Naga shawl =

Type of shawl

Naga shawls are traditional shawls with a distinctive pattern made by various Naga ethnic groups from Nagaland and its neighbouring areas in Northeast India. Naga shawls embody specific traditional connotations that symbolize status, identity, and achievement. Beyond being a piece of cloth, Naga shawls convey rich traditional narratives. These textiles serve as vehicles of communication, perpetually transmitted from one generation to the next, fostering cultural continuity within Naga society. Particularly noteworthy is their significance within the Naga community, which is devoid of script or written historical records.

The Naga shawl or Chakhesang Shawls is registered under the Geographical indications (GI) of Nagaland by Government of India.

== List of Naga shawls ==
=== Angami Naga ===
==== Lohepfhe ====
Lohepfhe also known as Lohekhwe or Lohükhü is a traditional shawl of the Angami Nagas.

==== Loramhoushü ====
Loramhoushü is a traditional is a wrap-around skirt worn by Angami women.

=== Ao Naga ===
==== Tsüngkotepsü ====
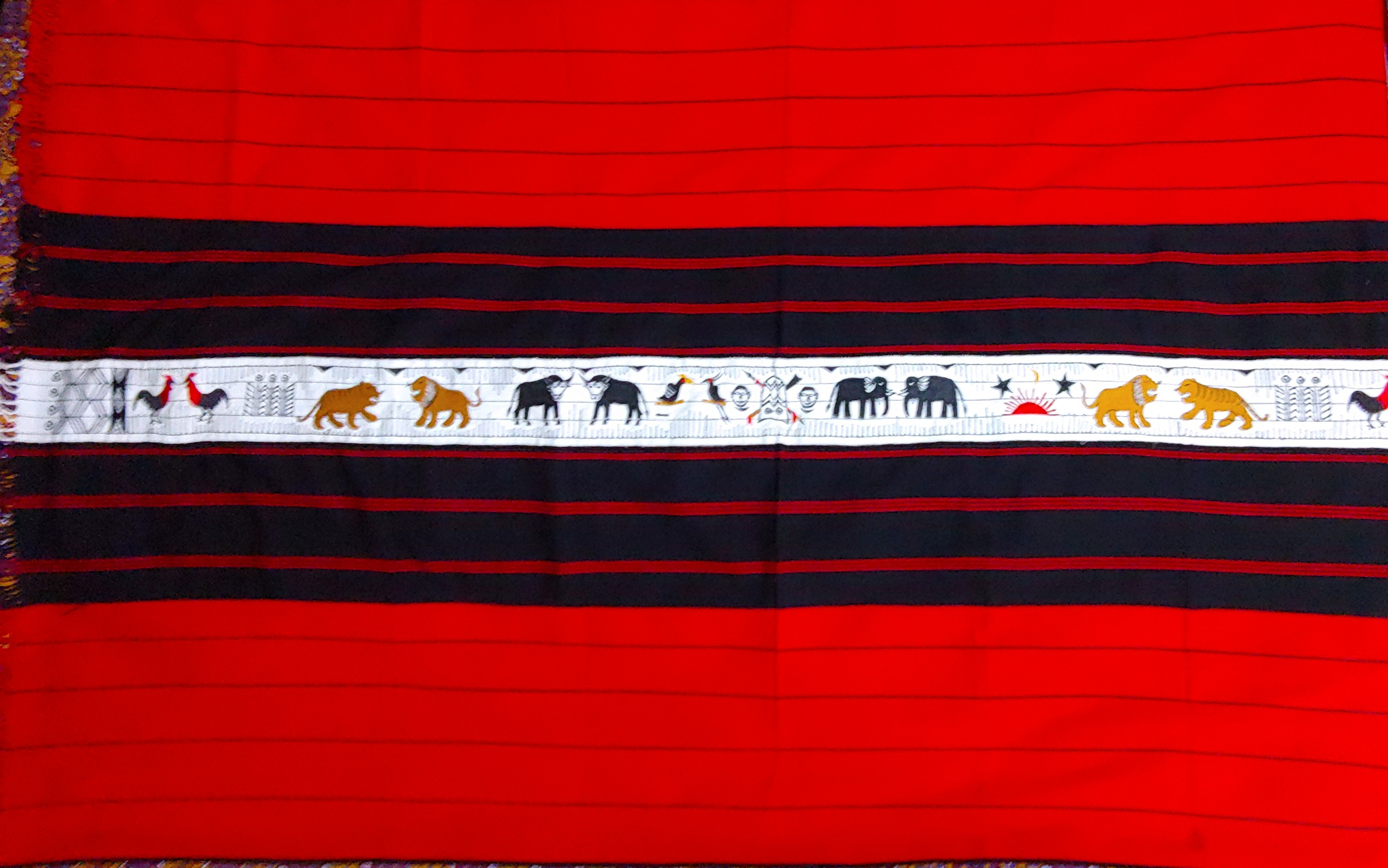
Tsüngkotepsü

The Tsüngkotepsü is a warrior shawl of the Ao Nagas of Nagaland. Traditionally, the Tsüngkotepsü can only be worn by warriors who had successfully taken the heads of enemy warriors, In modern times, the right to wear the Tsüngkotepsü is associated with performing a mithun sacrifice, a demonstration of wealth and are a distinctive symbol of the Ao Nagas.

=== Chakhesang Naga ===
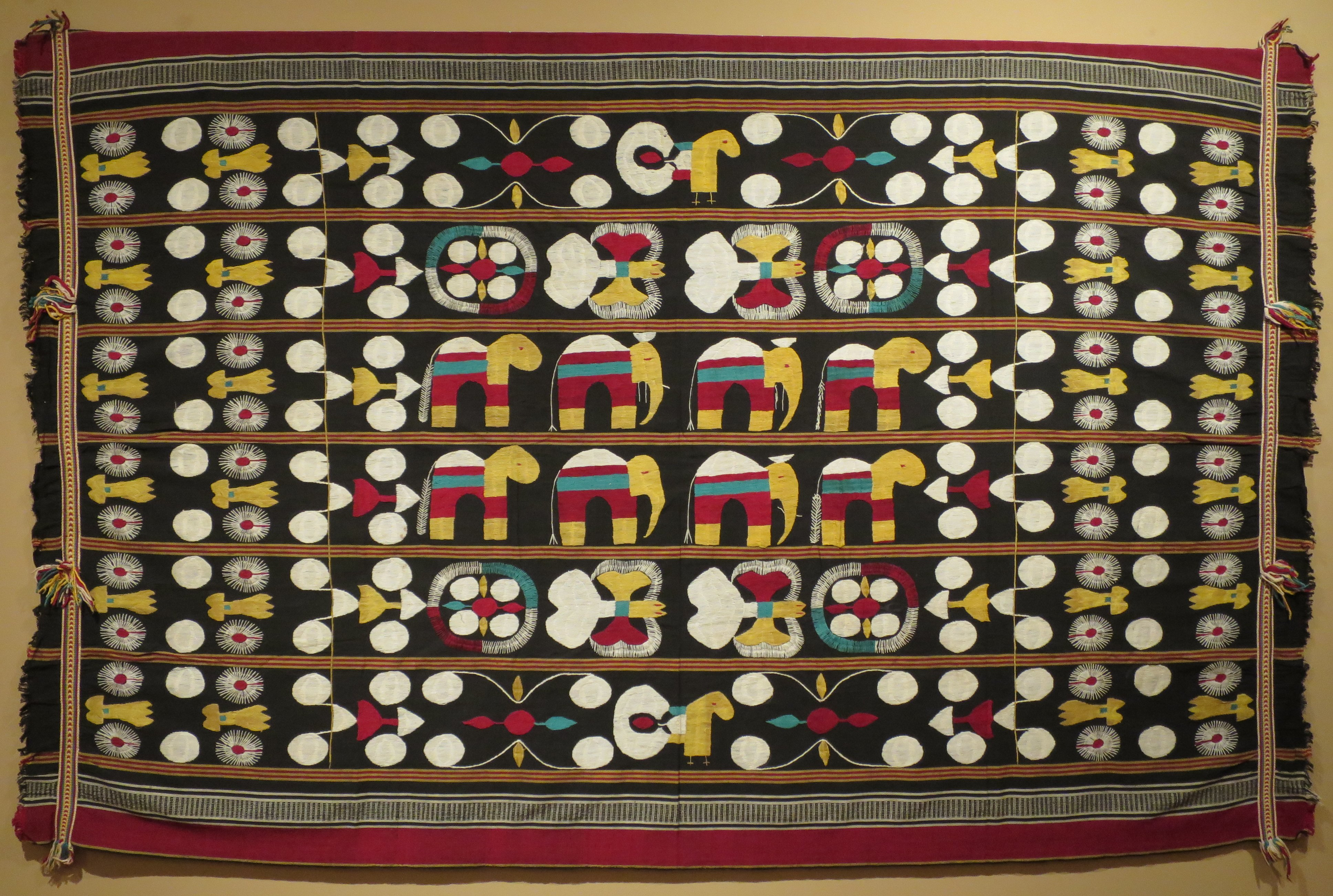
Chipikhwü

The Chakhesang Naga shawl has the Geographical Indication Tag. It was the third from Nagaland to be granted the GI registration after Naga King Chilli and Naga Tree Tomato. While the ‘Chakhesang Shawl’ is listed under the category of ‘Handicrafts’, the other two is registered under ‘Agricultural’ product under Geographical Indications of Goods (Registration & Protection) Act, 1999.

=== Khiamniungan Naga ===
==== Nütsah ====
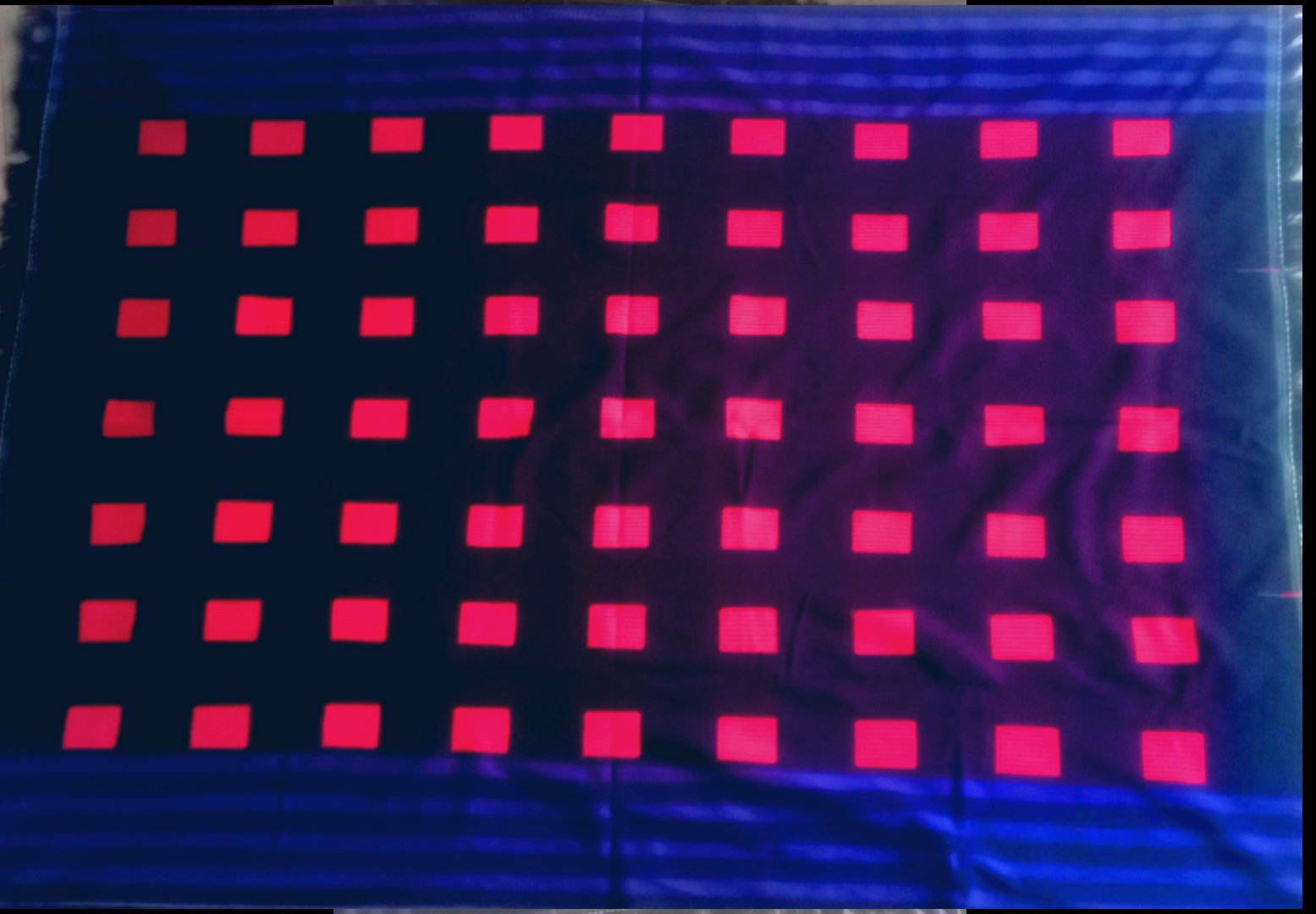
The Nütsah, one of the most important traditional clothing of the Khiamniungans. In fact, it was a part of social ranking in the past

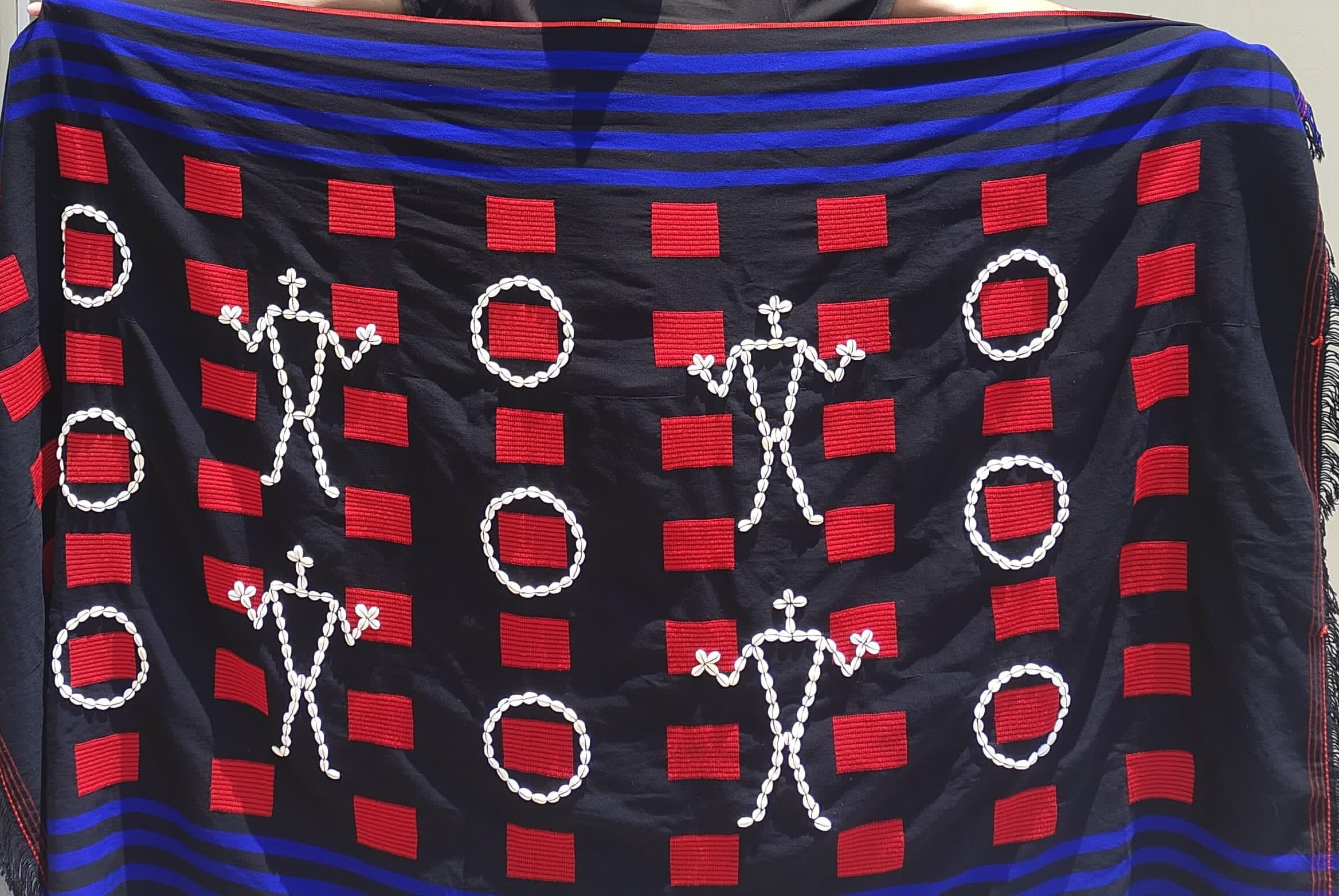
This Shawl which is quite similar to Nütsah is locally called Shiehtsapnie. The only difference is that it has cowrie shells in the form of circular and human figure.

A Nütsah (/nə³³.tsɑʔ³³/) is a traditional shawl created and woven by Khiamniungans of Noklak district in north-eastern India. The Khiamniungan Naga Shawl that has circles of cowrie shells is called Shiehtsap nie. But the exact same shawl without cowrie shells is called Nütsah. The shell was attached as a symbol of feasts of merit which the owner has hosted, depicting the shining stars in the sky during a nightly raid, or the moon and thus female fertility. The huge stylized human figure on the Nütsah indicates the owner's accomplishment in headhunting war. In those days such shawls could only be worn by distinguished accomplished warriors and wealthy men in the society. The red square that has 9x7 red blocks depicts fierce bloody war champion and the blue lines are a symbol of peaceful dominant disposition of all mankind.
