= Social rank theory =

Psychological theory

Social rank theory provides an evolutionary paradigm that locates affiliative and ranking structures at the core of many psychological disorders. In this context, displays of submission signal to dominant individuals that subordinate group members are not a threat to their rank within the social hierarchy. This helps to achieve social cohesion. According to social rank theory, anxiety and depression are natural experiences that are common to all mammalian species. It is the pathological exaggeration of anxiety and depression that contributes to psychological disorders.

== Social rank in group living ==
Three hundred million years ago proto-mammals individually competed for resources such as food, territory, and sexual partners. Over time, some species began to live in groups, which brought the evolutionary advantages of increased protection from predators and adversaries, increased access to resources, and better reproductive success. With the adoption of group living emerged two psychological systems which functioned to preserve the new social order: a social rank system and a safety system.

Upon adopting group living practices, competition between individuals shifted from struggles for territory to social rank, as dominant individuals have better access to limited resources than their subordinates. Dominant positions can also equate to high status as well as the authority to administer punishments and rewards within the group. Ranking benefits the group through the implementation of a social framework that lowers the overall energy expenditure of the group where conspecifics are competing for the same resources. For instance, the acknowledgement of differences in rank curbs aggressive behavior. Ranking also functions as a channel through which social control and resources are allocated. Thus, the purpose of the social rank system is to remain attuned to the social hierarchy to better compete for rank, and consequently expand resource acquisition.

Conversely, the safety system views the social world not as a competitive space, but instead as a cooperative space where others may extend reassurances and assistance. Thus, the safety system searches for opportunities to cooperate and connect with potential allies. Evaluations of sameness and difference are crucial to making in-group/out-group distinctions. One's level of belonging within the group is often based on the ability to conform to group mores and standards and has been found to be a predictor of group acceptance, popularity, and rank. It has been suggested that the ingroup/outgroup distinctions may have emerged from kin selection, as hunter-gatherer groups were often genetically related. Within humans, the sense of group belonging has evolved to become fundamental to physical and mental health and security, having important implications for self-esteem and self-identity. Because networks and alliances have become so important in humans, our internal evaluative algorithms, for making both judgments of rank and belonging, have become linked.

== Social ranking behavior ==
Studies demonstrate that primates adhere to two main forms of group living characterized by opposing interactional styles: agonic and hedonic. The agonic mode of interaction is typical of hierarchical societies, in which group members concentrate on defending against threats to status. Agonic behavior is focused around aggression as well as the inhibition of aggression, often through either submission or appeasement. On the other hand, the hedonic mode of interaction is characteristic of egalitarian societies, where cooperative and affiliative behavior is common. Hedonic behavior is more affectional and is distinguished by reassurance and reconciliation. Both modes of interaction can be found in all societies, to varying degrees.

=== Agonistic interactions ===
==== Ritualistic agonistic behavior ====
Agonistic competition spans back as far as 300 million years, and thus is deeply ingrained into the genome. Extensive observational evidence of reptiles and birds reveal that when they compete for breeding territory, individuals engage in a specific manner of interactional display, known as ritualistic agonistic behavior (RAB). Opponents confront one another and display various power signals which may include standing tall, maintaining eye contact, or puffing themselves up. This type of behavior can also be found in humans, especially in the context of a physical contest.

RAB functions as a means of evaluating the strength, fighting capability, and resource holding potential (RHP) of one's opponent. If one determines that their own RHP is inferior to that of their adversary and will likely lose the altercation, they may take flight and escape unscathed. On the other hand, if one determines that their own RHP is stronger than that of their opponent, they are free to initiate the altercation. Thus, an accurate internal evaluative algorithm is crucial not only for evading or prolonging potentially fatal fights, but also for provoking winning situations which may improve one's social rank.

==== Involuntary subordinate strategy ====
After assessing one's opponent, territorial species usually react with either a fight or flight response. However, in a "blocked escape" scenario, where territory is limited or escape is impossible, this pattern diverges. Upon losing dominance, defeated individuals undergo a change in physical demeanor known as the yielding subroutine of RAB or the involuntary subordinate strategy (ISS). For example, an early study of farmyard fowls found that despite an absence of physical injury, defeated birds seemed to be paralyzed. Furthermore, with their wings and head lowered to the ground, the birds seemed to experience depressive mood. Similarly, another study demonstrated that defeated lizards lost their characteristic bright colors, then died shortly after. Given the proximity to and dependency on conspecifics, group-living animals are perpetually faced with blocked escape scenarios, as a flight response to in-group confrontation would result in both diminished breeding chances as well as heightened threat of predation.

ISS impedes the capability of the subordinate individual to attempt a comeback and signals to their opponent that they are not longer a threat. Thus, ISS is adaptive in that it ensures that when the subordinate individual goes down, they stay down. Meanwhile, it also indicates to the dominant individual that their opponent has truly yielded, so altercation need not continue.

==== Submissive behaviors ====
Among group-living species, regular fighting is prevented through the inhibition and control of RAB. Within these groups, subordinates are largely responsible for acknowledging dominant individuals through overt acts of submission. Individuals who believe themselves to be in a subordinate role must be able to prevent the provocation of an attack by a dominant conspecific, or, if an attack is elicited, swiftly terminate the attack. Subordinate individuals are able to accomplish this through submissive involuntary body language, which can include screaming, sideways glances, the fear grin, lowering the eyes, crouching to appear smaller, etc.

Another avenue through which subordinates communicate their submission is through the mobilization of internal inhibition. Like the submissive postures and gestures listed above, internal inhibition is involuntary. This inhibitory process is characterized by the suppression of exploratory behavior and an inability to take initiative, both of which may be the consequences of attempts to avoid the aggressive attention of dominant individuals. Internal inhibition stimulates high states of arousal, and thus, increased levels of tension in subordinates. Internal inhibition can also lead to the loss of energy, depressed mood, retarded movements, reduced information processing capacity, sleep disturbance, poor appetite, loss of confidence, all of which are characteristic of depression. In submitting to dominant individuals and constraining their own reproductive and resource seeking behaviors, subordinates regulate levels of aggression within the group. It is in this context that external and internal inhibitive behaviors are adaptive.

=== Hedonistic interactions ===
Within the last ten million years, hedonistic forms of social competition have emerged. In hedonistic interactions individuals actively attract conspecifics in order to elevate social status. Status is achieved through the demonstration of constructive qualities such as beauty, intelligence, talents, and special abilities. Social approval of these qualities raises self-esteem, while disapproval can result in lowered self-esteem, loss of status, and reduced attractiveness to potential mates. In other words, the knowledge that one is valued by conspecifics signals reassurance and orients individuals towards affiliation as opposed to agonistic interactions. Hedonistic interactions are also characterized by the formation of alliances and coalitions, which offer another avenue through which to improve status. In building networks of alliances, individuals dedicate a lot of effort towards ensuring that one's self-presentation properly conforms to group mores and standards. As a result, a great deal of social life entails the seeking group approval which acts to both confirm rank and impart a sense of belonging.

==== Mate selection ====
Social dominance by means of attractiveness or heritage has been shown to be essential in determining reproductive success. For instance, it is not strength and aggression, but attractiveness that forms the basis of human mate selection. Human females tend to be drawn towards mates who are able to protect and invest in children. Thus, for women, attractiveness is associated with status. On the other hand, human males are often drawn towards biologically healthy mates which is manifested by natural beauty and youth.

==== Social investment ====
The dominance hierarchy is also an attention hierarchy in that well integrated individuals evoke and secure higher levels of positive social attention than less integrated individuals. Not only does positive attention lower defensive arousal, but positive attention from higher ranking individuals heightens mood. Social attention also functions as a means through which individuals can elicit investment from others. Conspecifics may be coaxed into investing in socially attractive individuals, who can then access more resources, form more alliances, secure mates, and affirm group membership. The measure of one's ability to secure attention and elicit investment is known as social attention holding potential (SAHP). With elevated social status, leadership roles, and access to more resources, those with high SAHP benefit from increased evolutionary fitness. On the other hand, individuals with low levels of SAHP tend to display the submissive behaviors characteristic of ISS such as inhibition, withdrawal, and lack of confidence. Estimates of rank and social attractiveness can be internalized. These internal estimates have implications for one's biological state. For instance, depressive brain state patterns may reflect either a primitive defeat-like state which involves loss of feeling and social withdrawal; or a more submissive pattern with various efforts to elicit investment from others; or some combination of the two.

== Psychological application ==
Social rank theory predicts that success within agonistic and hedonistic interactions can have the following effects on human psychopathology:

Interaction Type	Result on Psychopathology
Successful Affiliation	Social adjustment and mental health
Failure in Affiliation	Schizoid personality disorder, schizotypal or schizophreniform illness and an introverted, inner-directed mode of personality adjustment
Submission	Low self-esteem, feelings of shame and humiliation, dependent personality disorder, anxiety, depression, masochism, and a liability to be victimized or abused
Dominance	High self-esteem, Type A personality, hypomania, sadism, and a liability to victimize and abuse others

== See also ==
- Evolutionary Approaches to Depression
