= List of Naga languages =

Naga languages
- (geographic / cultural)
- Geographic distribution: India, Myanmar, China?
- Ethnicity: Naga people
- Linguistic classification: Sino-Tibetan: Tibeto-Burman; Naga languages
- Subdivisions: Angami–Pochuri; Central Naga (Ao); Northern Naga (Konyak); Southern Naga; Tangkhul-Maring (?); Western Naga (Zemeic)

Language codes
- Glottolog: None

This list of Naga languages includes various Sino-Tibetan languages spoken by the Naga peoples. Most of the native languages are classified under Naga languages, whereas Northern Naga languages fall under Sal languages. Both Sal languages and Kuki-Chin-Naga languages are classified as a Central Tibeto-Burman languages.

== Angami-Pochuri ==
- Angami languages are:
  - Angami
  - Chokri (Chokri Chakhesang)
  - Kuzhami (Kuzhami Chakhesang)
  - Mao (Sopvoma)
  - Poula (Poumai)
- Pochuri languages are:
  - Pochuri
  - Ntenyi (Northern Rengma)
  - Rengma
- Sumi languages are:
  - Sümi or Sema

== Central Naga ==
- Ao language
  - Chungli Ao
  - Mongsen Ao
  - Changki Ao
  - Dordar (Yacham)
  - Longla
- Lotha (Lhota)
- Sangtam ('Thukumi')
  - Kizare
  - Pirr (Northern Sangtam)
  - Phelongre
  - Thukumi (Central Sangtam)
  - Photsimi
  - Purr (Southern Sangtam)
- Yimchingric
  - Yimkhiungrü ('Yachumi')
    - Tikhir
    - Chirr
    - Phanungru
    - Langa
  - Para
  - Makuric
    - Makury
    - Long Phuri

Koki is a "Naga" languages spoken in and around Leshi Township, Myanmar that could possibly classify as Tangkhulic languages or Ao languages.

== Northern Naga ==
=== Konyak–Chang ===
- Konyak
- Chang
- Wancho
- Phom
- Khiamniungic
  - Khiamniungan
  - Leinong
  - Makyam
  - Ponyo

=== Tangsa–Nocte ===
- Tangsa (Tase)
  - Muklom
  - Pangwa Naga
  - Ponthai
  - Tikhak
- Nocte
  - Bote Naga
  - Hakhi Naga
  - Hakhun
  - Hame Naga
  - Hasik Naga
  - Hathim Naga
  - Khapa
  - Laju (Ollo Naga)
  - Lama Naga
- Tutsa

The Singpho language is sometimes included due to its proximity to Tangshang Naga.

== Southern Naga ==
- Anal
- Chiru
- Chothe
- Kharam
- Koireng
- Kom
- Lamkang
- Monsang
- Moyon
- Purum
- Sorbung (Tangkhul)
- Tarao

== Tangkhul-Maring ==
- Tangkhulic languages include:
  - Tangkhul
  - Somra
  - Akyaung Ari
  - Kachai
  - Huishu
  - Tusom
- Maringic languages
  - Maring
  - Uipo

== Western Naga ==
- Zeme proper
- Mzieme (Northern Zeme)
- Liangmai
- Rongmei
- Inpui (Puiron)
- Khoirao (Thangal)
- Maram

== See also ==
- Nagamese Creole
