= Naga languages =

Naga
- (geographic / cultural)
- Geographic distribution: India, Myanmar
- Ethnicity: Nagas
- Linguistic classification: Sino-Tibetan: Central Tibeto-Burman?; Kuki-Chin–Naga?; Naga
- Subdivisions: Angami–Ao; Tangkhul–Maring; Zemeic (Western)

Language codes
- Glottolog: naga1409

The Naga languages are a geographic and ethnic grouping of Sino-Tibetan languages, spoken mostly by Naga peoples.

The Northern Naga or Konyak languages do not fall within the group, in spite of being spoken by Naga groups; instead, these form part of the Sal languages within Sino-Tibetan, while the Southern Naga or Northwestern Kuki-Chin languages form a branch within the Kuki-Chin languages.

== Classification ==
=== Angami–Ao ===
==== Angami–Pochuri ====
- Angami-Pochuri languages
  - Angami
    - Angami
    - Chokri (Chokri Chakhesang)
    - Kuzhami (Kuzhami Chakhesang)
    - Mao (Sopvoma)
    - Poula (Poumai)
  - Pochuri
    - Pochuri
    - Ntenyi (Northern Rengma)
    - Rengma
    - Sümi (Sema)

==== Central Naga (Ao) ====
- Central Naga languages
  - Ao language
    - Chungli Ao
    - Mongsen Ao
    - Changki
    - Dordar (Yacham)
    - Longla
  - Patsho Khiamniungan
  - Lotha (Lhota)
  - Sangtam ('Thukumi')
    - Kizare
    - Pirr (Northern Sangtam)
    - Phelongre
    - Thukumi (Central Sangtam)
    - Photsimi
    - Purr (Southern Sangtam)
  - Yimchingric
    - Yimkhiungrü ('Yachumi')
      - Tikhir
      - Chirr
      - Phanungru
      - Langa
    - Para
    - Makuric
      - Makury
      - Long Phuri

=== Tangkhul–Maring ===
- Tangkhul–Maring languages
  - Tangkhulic
    - Tangkhul
    - Somra
    - Akyaung Ari
    - Kachai
    - Huishu
    - Tusom
  - Maringic
    - Khoibu
    - Maring

=== Western Naga (Zemeic) ===
- Western Naga (Zemeic) languages
  - Zeme proper
  - Mzieme (Northern Zeme)
  - Liangmai
  - Rongmei
  - Inpui (Puiron)
  - Khoirao (Thangal)
  - Maram

=== Koki ===
Koki is a "Naga" language spoken in and around Leshi Township, Myanmar that could possibly be classified as a Tangkhulic language or Ao language.

== See also ==
- Nagamese Creole
