= List of endangered languages in India =

Language Endangerment Status by UNESCO Atlas of the World's Languages in Danger category

Extinct (EX)
- Extinct (EX): (lists)

Endangered
- Critically Endangered (CR); Severely Endangered (SE); Definitely Endangered (DE); Vulnerable (VU): (list); (list); (list); (list)

Safe
- Safe (NE): no list
- Other categories
- Revived (RE); Constructed (CL): (list); (list)
- Related topics: Atlas of the World's Languages in Danger; Endangered Languages Project; Ethnologue; Unclassified language; List of languages by total number of speakers
- UNESCO Atlas of the World's; Languages in Danger categories

An endangered language is a language that is at a risk of falling out of use, generally because it has few surviving speakers. If it loses all of its native speakers, it becomes an extinct language. UNESCO defines four levels of language endangerment between "safe" (not endangered) and "extinct":

- Vulnerable
- Definitely endangered
- Severely endangered
- Critically endangered

A light-hearted interview about Mandeali where Ishan Kashyap Hazarika is asking questions in Hindi and the interviewee is answering, largely, in Mandeali, shot at the Hidimba Devi Temple, Manali, India

== List ==
The following table lists the 192 languages of India that are classified as vulnerable or endangered.

India
Language	Status	Comments	ISO 639-3	Speakers
A'tong language	Severely endangered		aot	(undated figure of 10,000, 4,600 in India)
Adi language	Vulnerable	Also spoken in: China	adi	150,000 total for the various languages (2011 census)
Aimol language	Critically endangered		aim	6,000 (2001 census)
Aiton language	Severely endangered		aio	1,500 (2006)
Anal language	Vulnerable		anm	120,000 (2011 census)
Angami language	Vulnerable		njm	150,000 (2011 census)
Angika language	Vulnerable	Also spoken in: Nepal	anp	(740,000 cited 1997–2011)
Ao language	Vulnerable		ngo	227,000 speakers(2011 census)
Apatani language	Vulnerable		apt	
Asur language	Definitely endangered		asr	
Badaga language	Definitely endangered		bfq	
Baghati language	Critically endangered		bfz	
Balti language	Vulnerable	Also spoken in: Pakistan	bft	
Bangani language	Critically endangered		gbm	
Bangni language	Vulnerable			
Bawm language	Definitely endangered	Also spoken in: Bangladesh	bgr	
Bellari language	Critically endangered		brw	
Bhadravahi language	Definitely endangered	Also spoken in: Pakistan	bhd	
Bhalesi language	Definitely endangered		bhd	
Bharmauri language	Definitely endangered		gbk	
Bhumij language	Vulnerable		bhu	
Halbi language	Vulnerable		bij	
Biete language	Definitely endangered		biu	
Birhor language	Critically endangered		biy	
Bishnupriya Manipuri language	Vulnerable	Also spoken in: Bangladesh	bpy	
Bodo language	Vulnerable		brx	
Bokar language	Vulnerable	Also spoken in: China	adi	
Bori language	Definitely endangered	Also spoken in: China	adi	
Brokskat language	Definitely endangered		bkk	
Bunan language	Definitely endangered		bfu	
Byangsi language	Definitely endangered	Also spoken in: Nepal	bee	
Chambeali language	Definitely endangered		cdh	
Chang language	Vulnerable		nbc	
Chokri language	Vulnerable		nri	
Churahi language	Definitely endangered		cdj	
Dakpa language	Definitely endangered	Also spoken in: Bhutan	dka	
Darma language	Definitely endangered	Also spoken in: Nepal	drd	
Deori language	Definitely endangered		der	
Dimasa language	Vulnerable		dis	
Gadaba language	Critically endangered		gdb, gau	
Galo language	Vulnerable		adl	
Gangte language	Definitely endangered		gnb	
Garhwali language	Vulnerable		gbm	
Geta? language	Severely endangered		gaq	
Gondi language	Vulnerable		gon	
Gorum language	Definitely endangered		pcj	
Gutob language	Vulnerable		gbj	
Handuri language	Critically endangered		hii	
Hill Miri language	Definitely endangered		mrg	
Hmar language	Vulnerable		hmr	
Ho language	Vulnerable		hoc	
Hrangkhol language	Vulnerable		hra	
Hruso language	Definitely endangered	Also known as: Aka	hru	
Idu language	Definitely endangered	Also spoken in: China	clk	
Irula language	Vulnerable		iru	
Jad language	Definitely endangered	Also spoken in: Pakistan	jda	
Jangshung language	Definitely endangered		jna, scu, ssk	
Jarawa language	Critically endangered		ang	
Jaunsari language	Definitely endangered		jns	
Juang language	Definitely endangered		jun	
Kabui language	Vulnerable		nkf	
Kachari language	Definitely endangered		xac	
Kanashi language	Definitely endangered		xns	
Kangdi language	Definitely endangered		xnr	
Karbi language	Vulnerable		mjw	
Khamba language	Definitely endangered	Also spoken in: China	kbg	
Khampti language	Vulnerable	Also spoken in: Myanmar		
Kharia language	Vulnerable		khr	
Khasali language	Definitely endangered			
Kheza language	Vulnerable		nkh	
Khiamngan language	Vulnerable		nky	
Khoirao language	Vulnerable		nki	
Khowa language	Definitely endangered		bgg	
Kinnauri language	Definitely endangered		kns, kfk, cif, tpq	
Koch language	Definitely endangered	Also spoken in Bangladesh, Nepal	kdq	
Koda language	Vulnerable		cdz	
Kodagu language	Definitely endangered		kfa	
Koireng language	Critically endangered		nkd	
Kokborok language	Vulnerable	Also spoken in: Bangladesh	trp	
Kolami language	Definitely endangered		kfb	
Kom language	Definitely endangered		kmm	
Konda language	Definitely endangered		kfc	
Konyak language	Vulnerable		nbe	
Koraga language	Critically endangered		kfd	
Korku language	Vulnerable		kfq	
Koro language	Definitely endangered			
Korwa language	Vulnerable		kfp	
Kota language	Critically endangered		kfe	
Kui language	Vulnerable		kxu	
Kului language	Definitely endangered		kfx	
Kumaoni language	Vulnerable	Also spoken in: Nepal	kfy	
Kundal Shahi language	Definitely endangered	Also spoken in: Pakistan		
Kurru language	Definitely endangered		yeu	
Kuruba language	Critically endangered		kfi	
Kurukh language	Vulnerable		kru	
Kutchi language	Vulnerable	Also spoken in: Pakistan	kfr	
Kuvi language	Definitely endangered		kxv	
Ladakhi language	Vulnerable	Also spoken in: China	cna, lbj, tkk	
Lamgang language	Critically endangered		lmk	
Lamongse language	Critically endangered		nik	
Langrong language	Critically endangered			
Lepcha language	Definitely endangered	Also spoken in: Bhutan, Nepal	lep	
Lotha language	Vulnerable		njh	
Liangmai language	Vulnerable		njn	
Limbu language	Definitely endangered	Also spoken in: Nepal	lif	
Lishpa language	Definitely endangered			
Luro language	Critically endangered		tef	
Mahasui language	Definitely endangered		bfz	
Malto language	Definitely endangered		kmj	
Manchad language	Vulnerable		lae	
Manda language	Critically endangered		mha	
Mandeali language	Definitely endangered		mjl	
Mao language	Vulnerable		nbi	
Mara language	Definitely endangered		mrh	
Maram language	Vulnerable		nma	
Maring language	Vulnerable		nng	
Miji language	Definitely endangered			
Miju language	Vulnerable	Also spoken in: China	mxj	
Milang language	Definitely endangered		adi	
Minyong language	Vulnerable		adi	
Mising language	Definitely endangered		mrg	
Mizo language	Vulnerable	Also spoken in: Myanmar	lus	
Motuo Menba language	Definitely endangered	Also spoken in: China	tsj	
Moyon language	Definitely endangered		nmo	
Mra language	Critically endangered	Also spoken in: China		
Mundari language	Vulnerable		muw	
Muot language	Critically endangered		ncb	
Mzieme language	Vulnerable		nme	
Na language	Critically endangered	Also spoken in: China		
Nahali language	Definitely endangered		nlx	
Naiki language	Critically endangered		nit	
Nihali language	Critically endangered		nll	
Nocte language	Vulnerable		njb	
Nruanghmei language	Vulnerable		nbu	
Nyishi language	Vulnerable		dap	
Onge language	Critically endangered		oon	
Padam language	Vulnerable			
Padri language	Vulnerable		bhd	
Paite language	Vulnerable		pck, smt	
Pangvali language	Critically endangered		pgg	
Parji language	Critically endangered		pci	
Pasi dialect of Adi	Definitely endangered		adi	
Pengo language	Critically endangered		peg	
Phom language	Vulnerable		nph	
Pochuri language	Vulnerable		npo	
Pu language	Critically endangered		caq	
Purik language	Vulnerable	Also spoken in: Pakistan	prx	
Purum language	Critically endangered			
Rabha language	Vulnerable		rah	
Remo language	Severely endangered		bfw	
Rengma language	Vulnerable		nnl, nre	
Rongpo language	Vulnerable		rnp	
Sanenyo language	Critically endangered		crv	
Sangtam language	Vulnerable		nsa	
Sentinelese language	Critically endangered		std	
Sherdukpen language	Vulnerable		sdp	
Sherpa language	Vulnerable	Also spoken in: China, Nepal	xsr	
Shompen language	Critically endangered		sil	
Simi language	Vulnerable		nsm	
Singpho language	Definitely endangered		sgp	
Sirmaudi language	Critically endangered		srx	
Sora language	Vulnerable		srb	
Spiti language	Vulnerable	Also spoken in: Pakistan	spt	
Sulung language	Definitely endangered	Also spoken in: China	suv	
Sylheti language	Endangered	Also spoken in: Bangladesh	suv	
Tagin language	Vulnerable			
Tai Nora language	Critically endangered			
Tai Phake language	Severely endangered		phk	
Tai Rong language	Critically endangered			
Takahanyilang language	Critically endangered		nik	
Tamang language	Vulnerable	Also spoken in: Nepal	taj, tge, tmk, tsf, tdg	
Tangam language	Critically endangered		adi	
Tangkhul language	Vulnerable		nmf	
Tangsa language	Vulnerable		nst	
Tarao language	Critically endangered		tro	
Taruang language	Vulnerable	Also spoken in: China, Myanmar	mhu	
Tawang language	Vulnerable	Also spoken in: Bhutan, China	twm	
Thado language	Vulnerable		tcz	
Tinan language	Definitely endangered	Also spoken in: China	lbf	
Tiwa language	Definitely endangered		lax	
Toda language	Critically endangered		tcx	
Toto language	Critically endangered		txo	
Tshangla language	Vulnerable	Also spoken in: Bhutan, China	tsj	
Tulu language	Vulnerable		tcy	
Turi language	Definitely endangered		trd	
Saurashtra language	Vulnerable		trd	
Wancho language	Vulnerable		nnp	
Yimchungru language	Vulnerable		yim	
Zakhring language	Definitely endangered	Also spoken in: China	zkr	
Zangskari language	Definitely endangered		zau	
Zeme language	Vulnerable		nzm	
