= Bible translations into the languages of India =

Collections of Holy Scriptures, in 62 languages

Languages spoken in the Indian subcontinent belong to several language families, the major ones being the Indo-Aryan languages spoken by 75% of Indians and the Dravidian languages spoken by 20% of Indians. Other languages belong to the Austroasiatic, Sino-Tibetan, Tai-Kadai, and a few other minor language families and isolates. India has the world's second-highest number of languages (780), after Papua New Guinea (839). The first known translation of any Christian Scripture in an Indian language was done to Konkani in 1667 AD by Ignazio Arcamone, an Italian Jesuit.

== North Indian languages ==
- Bible translations into Hindi and Urdu
- Bible translations into Konkani
- Bible translations into Marathi
- Bible translations into Nepali
- Bible translations into Sanskrit

=== Gujarati ===
A Gujarati translation of the Bible had been issued by the Serampore Mission Press in 1820, and William Carey had contributed to it. James Skinner and William Fyvie of the London Missionary Society continued the work. These were all superseded by J. V. S. Taylor's 1862 "Old Version" which remains the standard version today. The first Gujarati translation was undertaken by the Serampore Mission Press in 1820. Then in 1861 Rev. J. V. S. Taylor translated the Bible into Gujarati.

In collaboration with Church centric bible translation, Free Bibles India has published a Gujarati translation online.

In 2016, the New Testament of New World Translation of the Holy Scriptures was released by Jehovah's Witnesses in Gujarati. with mobile versions released through JW Library application in App stores.

=== Punjabi ===
The British and Foreign Bible Society produced translations in Western Punjabi in Persian script and Roman script, and Eastern Punjabi in Gurmukhi script.

The Western Punjabi Persian script New Testament of 1912 was revised in 1952 and some books of the Old Testament were published in Persian script. Some books were also published in Roman script.

In collaboration with Church centric bible translation, Free Bibles India has published an Eastern Punjabi translation online in Gurmukhi script.

In 2011, the New Testament of New World Translation of the Holy Scriptures was released by Jehovah's Witnesses in Punjabi. It was published online (also offline in PDF format) with mobile versions released through JW Library application in App stores.

=== Bhili ===
The New Testament in the Bhili language, titled 'Sarvoccha Parameshwar', was published in 2012 by P.T. Thomas. He began working on the translation in the early 1990s, while living in Jhabua. As of 2024, the translation of the Old Testament and the complete Bhili Bible is in its final stages of preparation for publication.

== East Indian languages ==
=== Oriya ===
In collaboration with Church centric bible translation, Free Bibles India has published an Oriya translation online.

=== Assamese ===
Nathan Brown, a Baptist, translated Bible into Assamese (1848) and Shan (1830s).

In collaboration with Church centric bible translation, Free Bibles India has published an Assamese translation online.

Since May 2023, Assamese বাইবেলৰ কিতাপবোৰ books of the Bible have been made available for free by Jehovah's Witnesses.

=== Bengali ===
William Carey translated Bible into Bengali Bible into Bengali.

In collaboration with Church centric bible translation, Free Bibles India has published a Bengali translation online.

Since July 2020, the Bengali-language পবিত্র বাইবেল—নতুন জগৎ অনুবাদ New World Translation of the Bible has been made available for free by Jehovah's Witnesses.

== Northeast Indian languages ==
The first translation of the Bible into any of the languages of Northeast India was in Assamese (1883) followed by Khasi version, published in 1891. Translations into many other languages have appeared since then with the most prominent and largest languages such as Garo (1924), Mizo (1959), Bodo (1981), Meitei (1984), Kokborok (2013) and Nyishi (2016).

The list of languages with year of Bible translations are listed in table below.

| State | Language version and date of publication |
|---|---|
| Arunachal Pradesh | Nyishi (2016), Wancho Naga (2002-NT), Adi (2008-NT), Nocte Naga (2010), Apatani (2014), Tangsa Naga (2015) |
| Assam | Assamese (1883), Karbi (1954), Hmar (1920-Mark, 1960-NT, 1968), Rengma Naga (1976), Bodo Kachari (1981), Tiwa Kachari (1987), Rabha Kachari (2000-NT), Mising Kachari (2001-NT), Dimasa Kachari (2005-NT), Hrangkhol Hmar (2008), Biate Hmar (2016) |
| Manipur | Meiteilon (1984), Tangkhul (1936), Hmar (1920-Mark, 1960-NT, 1968), Kuki/Thadou (1971), Paite/Zomi(1971), Zou (1983, 1992), Maring Naga (1988), Rongmei Naga (1989), Gangte (1991), Thangal/Koirao Naga (1999), Liangmei Naha (2001), Lamkang (2002), Anāl (2006), Vaiphei (2006), Moyon (2008), Chiru (2009), Monsang (2009, 2016), Poumei Naga (2009), Zeme Naga (2009), Inpui (2011), Aimol (2016), Chothe (2016), Kom (2016) |
| Meghalaya | Khasi (1891), Garo (1924) |
| Mizoram | Pangkho (1954), Mara (Lakher) (1956), Lushei/Mizo (1959), Hmar (1920-Mark, 1960-NT, 1968), Lai Hakha (1978), Bawmzo (1989), Paihte/Tedim (1994), Paite (2004), Lai Falam (2005), Chakma (2012), Galte/Ralte (2012) |
| Nagaland | Ao (1967), Angami (1970), Rengma (1976), Pochury (1994), Lotha (2000), Konyak (1992), Southern Rengma (1999), Chang (2002), Sema (2004), Phom (2005), Liangmei (2001), Zeme (2009), |
| Tripura | Ranglong (2003-NT), Hrangkhol (2008), Kaubru (2011), Kokborok (2013), Darlong (2014) |

== Dravidian languages ==
- Bible translations into Tamil
- Bible translations into Telugu
- Bible translations into Kannada
- Bible translations into Malayalam
- Bible translation into Tulu

=== Paniya ===
Paniya is a Southern Dravidian language mainly found in scheduled castes in Kerala and Tamil Nadu. Indian Bible Translators (IBT) have translated and published the New Testament in the Paniya language(2016). Thambi Durai and Elizabeth are the translators in Paniya for Indian Bible Translators. Currently IBT is carrying out the translation of Old Testament in Paniya.

Stephen Daniel translated the portions of the Bible into the Paniya language. Theyyam Mancheyaathaayina Kathe, the Translation of the New Testament in the Paniya language was pioneered and presented by Mathews Vergis to the Paniya tribe on 30 December 2008. The Paniyas have historically worked as agricultural laborers. People who natively speak Paniyas are mainly found in the borders of Kerala and Mysore, with a dwindling population of about approximately 120,000. Initially only the Gospel of Luke was translated and presented to the tribe. The Paniya language has no script of its own which is why Mathews Vergis used the Malayalam script to publish the Bible in their language.

=== Jennu Kuruba Language ===
Vasa Nyama, the Translation of the New Testament in the Jennu Kuruba language was published by Mathews Vergis to the Jennu Kuruba tribe on 10 September 2015. People of the Jennu Kuruba tribe are traditionally honey gatherers and are found in forests in Southern central India. Since the forests are getting slaughtered and synthetic honey is replacing natural honey, the tribe is decaying and the people are getting scattered.

Initially only the Gospel of Mark was translated and presented to the tribe. Mathews Vergis completed and presented the entire New Testament because of the earnest and eagerness of the Jennu Kuruba people, though few in number. The Jennu Kuruba language has no script of its own and hence Mathews Vergis used the Kannada script to present the Bible in their language. This is the first piece of literature in print ever since the existence of this tribe.

=== Benjara ===
Navo Karar, the translation of the New Testament in the Benjara language of the Benjara ethnic tribe was published by Mathews Vergis on 12 August 2015. The people of the Benjara tribe migrated from Afghanistan and settled in Rajasthan, India long ago. They were salt merchants and suppliers of bullocks. Being nomadic in nature, they spread to different parts of India, namely Karnataka, Andhra Pradesh, Telangana, and Maharashtra. In Karnataka they are known as Lambanis and in other places as Lambadis. Among these states, the state of Karnataka has about a million Lambanis – the highest in India. The Benjara language has no script and the people are familiar with the language of the home states. Thus Kannada script is used to present the Bible to the Lambanis to understand the Bible in their language. This is the first piece of literature to be printed in the Benjara language.

=== Kulu ===
Markana Nalla Shuddhi, the translation of the 'Gospel according to Mark' in the Kulu Language spoken by the ethnic Korama and Koracha tribes of South India, was pioneered by Mathews Vergis and was presented to the tribe on 28 December 2015. Though the language is spoken by around 200,000 of people belonging to the Koracha and Korama tribes, it failed to find a place in the dictionary of Indian tribal languages along with scores of other tribal languages recorded in the Census taken by the Government of India a decade and half ago. It was the request of the people of the Koracha and Korama tribes that propelled Mathews Vergis to pioneer the translation of the Gospel according to Mark into the Kulu language. Incidentally this is the first piece of literature in print ever since the existence of the Koracha and Korama tribes on earth.

=== Tulu ===
Parts of The New Testament were translated into the Tulu language of Karnataka in Kannada script in 1842 and the complete New Testament in 1847 by the Basel Missionaries in Mangalore.

== See also ==
- List of Bible translations by language
- Bible Society of India
- Bible translations into the languages of Northeast India
