= Bible translations into the languages of Northeast India =

The first translation of the Bible into any of the languages of Northeast India was an Assamese version, published in 1813 with title as Dharmapustak. Translations into many other languages have appeared since then. A new version of the Assamese Bible was released in February 2022 by John Moolachira, the archbishop of Guwahati. A Bodo version of the Bible, called Gwthar Baibel, is also available.

== By state ==
State	Language version and date of publication
Arunachal Pradesh	Nyishi (2016), Wancho Naga (2002-NT), Adi (2008-NT), Nocte Naga (2010), Apatani (2012-NT), Tangsa Naga (2015)
Assam	Assamese (1883), Karbi (1954), Hmar (1920-Mark, 1960-NT, 1968), Rengma Naga (1976), Bodo Kachari (1981), Tiwa Kachari (1987), Rabha Kachari (2000-NT), Mising Kachari (2001-NT), Dimasa Kachari (2005-NT), Hrangkhol Hmar (2008), Biate Hmar (2016)
Manipur	Meiteilon (1984), Tangkhul (1936), Hmar (1920-Mark, 1960-NT, 1968), Kuki/Thadou (1971), Paite/Zomi(1971), Zou (1983, 1992), Maring Naga (1988), Rongmei Naga (1989), Gangte (1991), Thangal/Koirao Naga (1999), Liangmei Naha (2001), Lamkang (2002), Anāl (2006), Vaiphei (2006), Moyon (2008), Chiru (2009), Monsang (2009, 2016), Poumei Naga (2009), Zeme Naga (2009), Inpui (2011), Aimol (2016), Chothe (2016), Kom (2016)
Meghalaya	Khasi (1891), Garo (1924)
Mizoram	Pangkho (1954), Mara (Lakher) (1956), Lushei/Mizo (1959), Hmar (1920-Mark, 1960-NT, 1968), Lai Hakha (1978), Bawmzo (1989), Paihte/Tedim (1994), Paite (2004), Lai Falam (2005), Chakma (2012), Galte/Ralte (2012)
Nagaland	Ao (1967), Angami (1970), Rengma (1976), Pochury (1994), Lotha (1967) 2000), Konyak (1992), Southern Rengma (1999), Chang (2002), Sema (2004), Phom (2005) 199, Liangmei (2001), Zeme (2009)
Tripura	Ranglong Hmar (2003), Hrangkhol Hmar (2008), Kaubru (2011), Kokborok (2013), Darlong Hmar (2014)

== By date of publication ==
- 1891 - Khasi
- 1924 - Garo
- 1936 - Tangkhul
- 1956 - Mara
- 1959 - Mizo
- 1964 - Ao
- 1970 - Angami
- 1971 - Kuki
- 1981 - Bodo
- 1983 - Zou
- 1984 - Meitei
- 1992 - Zou
- 2012 - Chakma
- 2013 - Kokborok
- 2016 - Nyishi

== See also ==
- Bible translations into the languages of India
- List of Bible translations by language
- Bible Society of India
- List of Christian denominations in North East India
