= AIR FM Tragopan =

Kohima; India
- Broadcast area: Nagaland
- Frequency: 103 MHz
- Branding: This is All India Radio FM Tragopan - One Zero Three Megahertz

Programming
- Languages: English, Nagamese & Hindi
- Format: Music & News Radio

Ownership
- Owner: All India Radio
- Operator: AIR Kohima

History
- First air date: 2 October 2017

FM Tragopan (AIR FM Tragopan 103 MHz) is a radio channel broadcast from All India Radio Kohima station. It was launched on 2 October 2017, and is available on 103 MHz frequency in Kohima. It also available on DD Free Dish.

The FM was named after the Nagaland's state bird Blyth's Tragopan, an endangered species mostly found in Nagaland.

== Content ==
AIR FM Tragopan broadcasts FM programmes from 6:30 am to 9:30 pm. The main languages of programming are English, Nagamese and Hindi. It broadcasts music shows playing Bollywood and Western music. It also showcases Naga music and entertainment programmes.

For the news segment AIR FM Tragopan has 16 bulletins: 14 local dialect bulletins and 2 regional bulletins in Nagamese and English. The local dialect bulletins are in Sangtam, Yimchungrü, Konyak, Khiamniungan, Phom, Chang, Zeliang, Kuki, Rengma, Sumi, Lotha, Chakhesang, Ao and Angami languages.

Between 12:00 pm to 03:00 pm, the station relays programmes of AIR FM Rainbow India, Dopahar Samachar and Mid-day News. FM Tragopan also broadcasts Mann Ki Baat and its Nagamese translation on every last Sunday of the month at 11:00 am and 11.30 am respectively.
