= List of languages by number of native speakers in India =

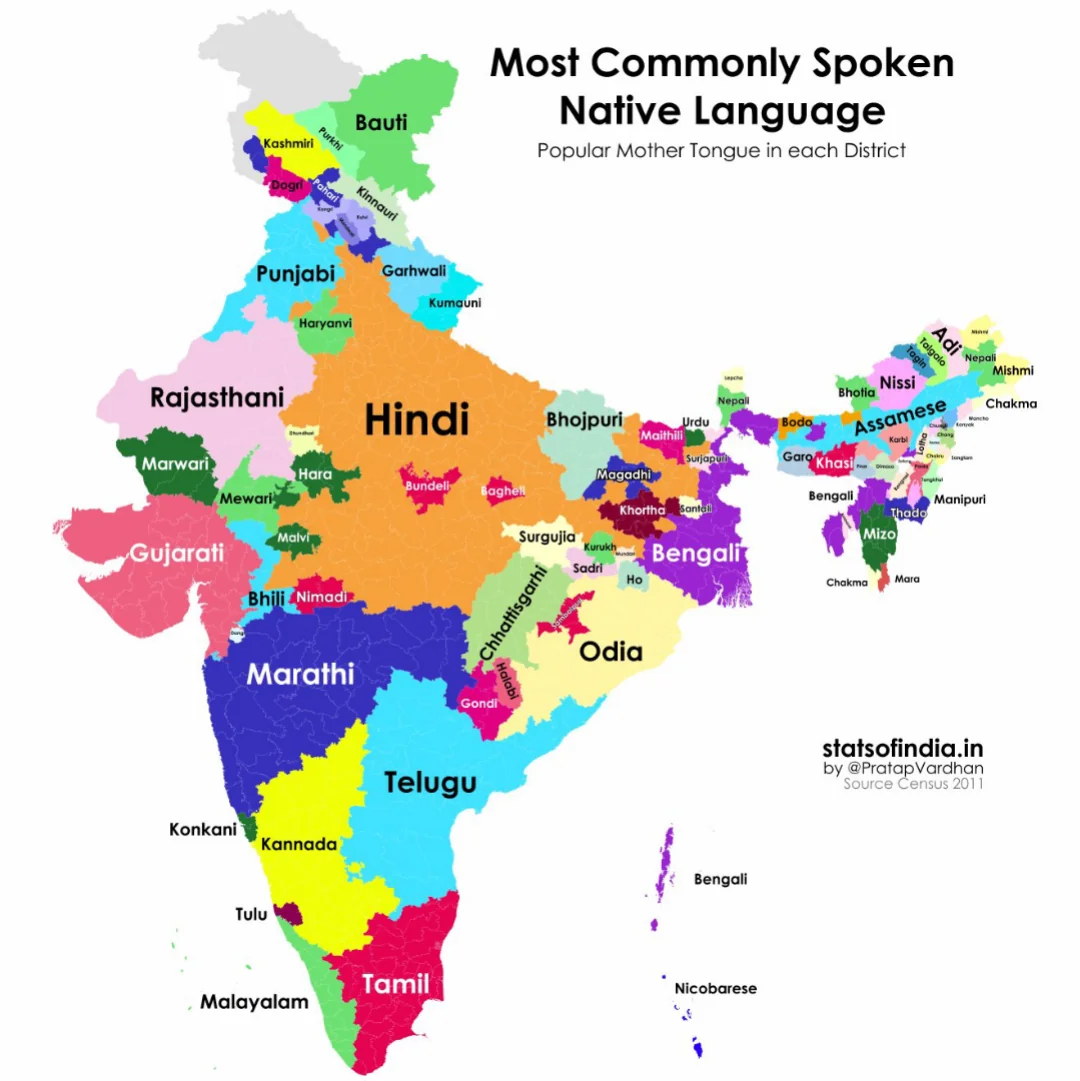
States and union territories of India by the spoken first language (Note: Some languages may be over- or under-represented as the census data used is at a state-level. For example, while Urdu has 52 million speakers (2001), in no state is it a majority language.)

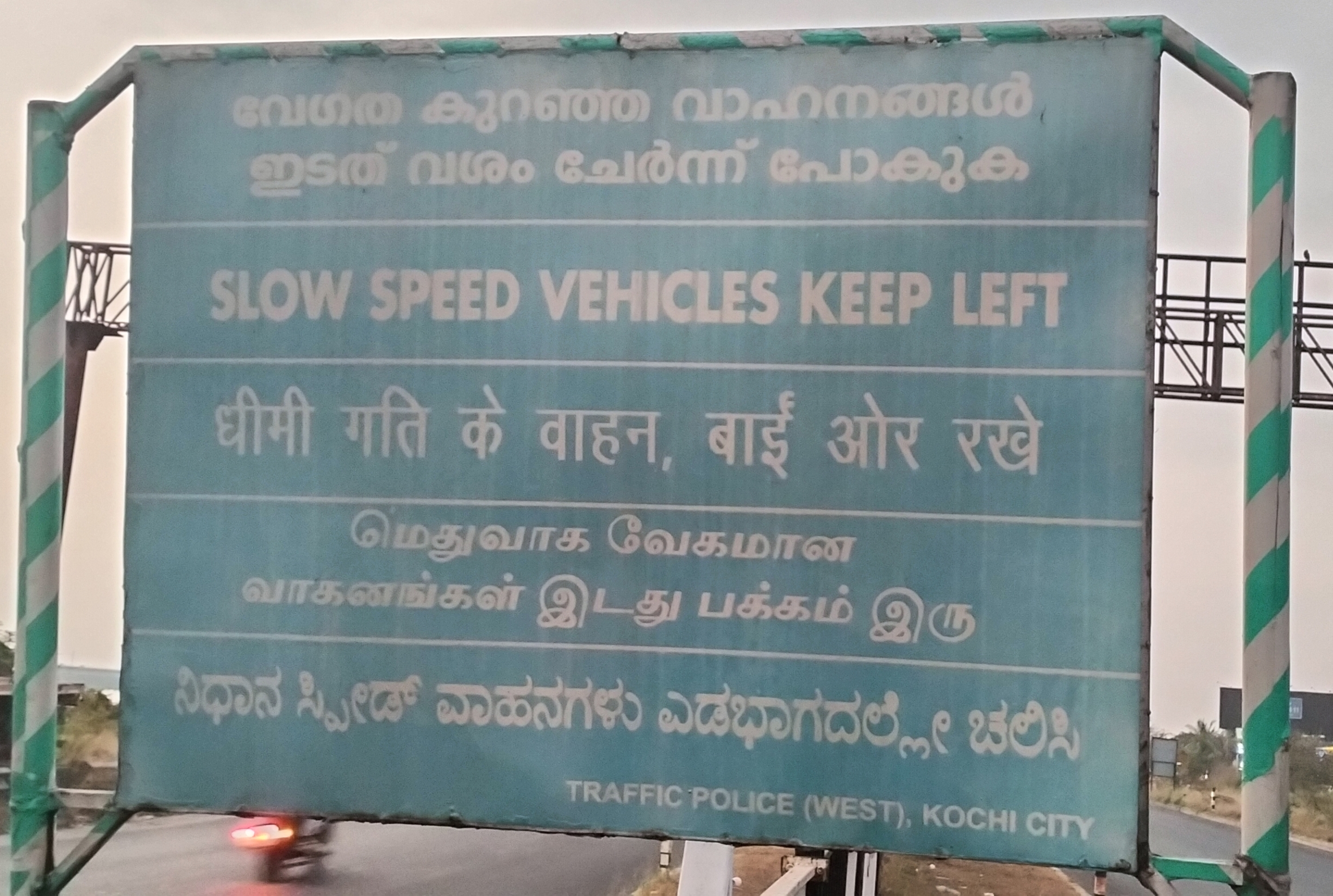
A pentalingual highway sign in Kochi written in Malayalam, English, Hindi, Tamil and Kannada

The Republic of India is home to several hundred languages. Most Indians speak a language belonging to the families of the Indo-Aryan branch of Indo-European (c. 77%), the Dravidian (c. 20.61%), the Austroasiatic (precisely Munda and Khasic) (c. 1.2%), or the Sino-Tibetan (precisely Tibeto-Burman) (c. 0.8%), with some languages of the Himalayas still unclassified. The SIL Ethnologue lists 424 living languages in India.

== Overview ==
India has not had a national language since its independence in 1947. However, Rule 1976 (As Amended, 1987) of the Constitution of India, mandates English as the "Official Languages" required "for Official Purpose of the Union." Business in the Indian parliament is transacted in either Hindi or in English. English is allowed for official purposes such as parliamentary proceedings, judiciary, communications between the Central Government and a State Government.

States within India have the liberty and powers to select their own official language(s) through legislation. In addition to the two Official Languages, the constitution recognises 22 regional languages, named in a specific list as "Scheduled Languages". (Hindi is but English is not.) India's Constitution includes provisions detailing the languages used for the official purposes of the union, the languages used for the official purposes of each state and union territory and the languages used for communication between the union and the states.

Hindi is the most widely spoken language, mostly prevalent in the northern parts of India. The Indian census takes the widest possible definition of "Hindi" as a broad variety of the "Hindi Belt". According to 2001 Census, 53.6% of the Indian population declared that they speak Hindi as either their first or second language, in which 41% of them have declared it as their native language. 12% of Indians declared that they can speak English as a second language.

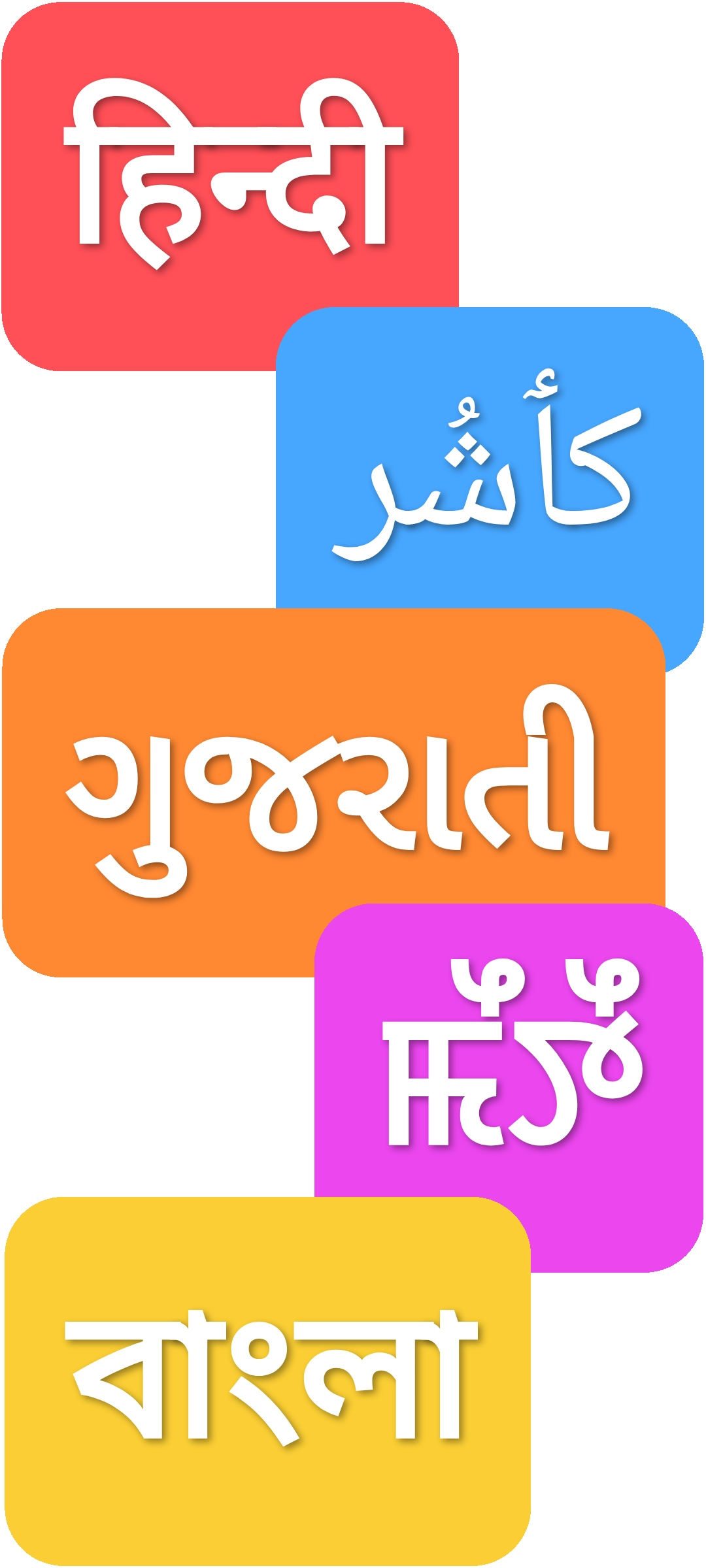
Fastest growing languages of India — Hindi (first), Kashmiri (second), Gujarati & Meitei/Manipuri (third), Bengali (fourth) — based on 2011 census of India

Hindi is the fastest growing language of India, followed by Kashmiri in the second place, with Meitei (officially called "Manipuri") as well as Gujarati, in the third place, and Bengali in the fourth place, according to the 2011 census of India.

Thirteen languages account for more than 1% of Indian population each, and between themselves for over 95%; all of them are "scheduled languages of the constitution". Scheduled languages spoken by fewer than 1% of Indians are Santali (0.63%), Kashmiri (0.54%), Nepali (0.28%), Sindhi (0.25%), Konkani (0.24%), Dogri (0.22%), Meitei (0.14%), Bodo (0.13%) and Sanskrit (In the 2011 census of India, 24,821 people reported Sanskrit as their native language). The largest language that is not "scheduled" is Bhili (0.95%), followed by Gondi (0.27%), Khandeshi (0.21%), Tulu (0.17%) and Kurukh (0.10%).

As per 2011 census, 26% of Indians are bilingual and 7% are trilingual.

India has a Greenberg's diversity index of 0.914—i.e. two people selected at random from the country will have different native languages in 91.4% of cases.

As per the 2011 Census of India, languages by highest number of speakers are as follows: Hindi, Bengali, Marathi, Telugu, Tamil, Gujarati, Urdu, Kannada, Odia, Malayalam.

== List of languages by number of native speakers ==
Ordered by number of speakers as first language.

=== More than one million speakers ===
The 2011 census recorded 31 individual languages as having more than 1 million native speakers (0.1% of total population). The languages in bold, for all tables, are the 22 scheduled languages.

The first table is restricted to only speaking populations for the 22 scheduled languages and English. In this table, only 2 languages, namely Sanskrit and English, have less than 1 million native speakers.

First, second, and third languages by number of speakers in India (2011 Census)
	First language speakers		Second language speakers	Third language speakers	Total speakers	
Language	Figure	% of total population	Second language speakers	Third language speakers	Figure	% of total population
**Hindi** (Note: Hindi does not merely refer to "Modern Standard Hindi" (which is based on Dehlavi dialect of Kauravi), but also broadly many "Hindi languages", which includes Western Hindi (apart from Urdu), Eastern Hindi, Bihari languages except for Maithili, the Rajasthani languages, and the Pahari languages apart from Nepali and (in 2001) Dogri, whether or not the included varieties were reported as "Hindi" or under their individual names during census.)	528,347,193	43.63%	138,909,608	24,307,234	691,564,035	57.11%
**Bengali**	97,237,669	8.03%	9,095,810	1,138,764	107,472,243	8.88%
**Marathi**	83,026,680	6.86%	13,001,079	3,031,027	99,058,786	8.18%
**Telugu**	81,127,740	6.70%	12,167,609	1,206,254	94,501,603	7.80%
**Tamil**	69,026,881	5.70%	6,668,000	900,985	76,595,866	6.33%
**Gujarati**	55,492,554	4.58%	4,017,825	778,930	60,289,309	4.98%
**Urdu** (Note: Although linguistically, Modern Standard Hindi and Urdu are classified together as a single language called Hindustani, the government classifies them as separate languages instead of different standard registers of the same language due to socio-political reasons.)	50,772,631	4.19%	11,348,978	1,117,836	63,239,445	5.22%
**Kannada**	43,706,512	3.61%	13,609,709	1,434,578	58,750,799	4.85%
**Odia**	37,521,324	3.10%	4,670,796	397,213	42,589,333	3.52%
**Malayalam**	34,838,819	2.88%	581,591	218,932	35,639,342	2.94%
**Punjabi**	33,124,726	2.74%	2,237,126	719,901	36,081,753	2.98%
**Assamese**	15,311,351	1.26%	7,583,346	734,379	23,629,076	1.95%
**Maithili**	13,583,464	1.12%	651,987	48,843	14,284,294	1.18%
**Santali**	7,368,192	0.61%	278,448	76,663	7,723,303	0.64%
**Kashmiri**	6,797,587	0.56%	127,039	70,197	6,994,823	0.58%
**Nepali**	2,926,168	0.24%	366,648	143,798	3,436,614	0.28%
**Sindhi**	2,772,264	0.23%	281,177	48,591	3,102,032	0.26%
**Dogri**	2,596,767	0.21%	126,334	40,883	2,763,984	0.23%
**Konkani**	2,256,502	0.19%	238,345	87,134	2,581,981	0.21%
**Meitei**	1,761,079	0.15%	384,357	101,690	2,247,126	0.19%
**Bodo**	1,482,929	0.12%	57,583	20,132	1,560,644	0.13%
**English**	259,678	0.02%	82,717,239	45,562,173	128,539,090	10.62%
**Sanskrit**	24,821	0.002%	1,134,362	1,963,640	3,122,823	0.26%

Table: Population ordered by number of native speakers
Rank	Language	1991 census of India (total: 838,583,988)		2001 census of India (total: 1,028,610,328)		2011 Census of India (total: 1,210,854,977)		Encarta 2007 estimate Worldwide total
		Speakers	Percentage	Speakers	Percentage	Speakers	Percentage	Speakers
1	**Hindi**	329,518,087	39.29%	422,048,642	41.1%	**528,347,193**	**43.63%**	366 million
2	**Bengali**	69,595,738	8.30%	83,193,311	8.09%	**97,237,669**	**8.03%**	207 million
3	**Marathi**	62,481,681	7.45%	71,936,894	6.99%	**83,026,680**	**6.86%**	68.0 million
4	**Telugu**	66,017,615	7.87%	74,002,856	7.19%	**81,127,740**	**6.70%**	69.7 million
5	**Tamil**	53,006,368	6.32%	60,793,814	5.91%	**69,026,881**	**5.70%**	66.0 million
6	**Gujarati**	40,673,814	4.85%	46,091,617	4.48%	**55,492,554**	**4.58%**	46.1 million
7	**Urdu**	43,406,932	5.18%	51,536,111	5.01%	**50,772,631**	**4.19%**	60.3 million
8	**Kannada**	32,753,676	3.91%	37,924,011	3.69%	**43,706,512**	**3.61%**	35.3 million
9	**Odia**	28,061,313	3.35%	33,017,446	3.21%	**37,521,324**	**3.10%**	32.3 million
10	**Malayalam**	30,377,176	3.62%	33,066,392	3.21%	**34,838,819**	**2.88%**	35.7 million
11	**Punjabi**	23,378,744	2.79%	29,102,477	2.83%	**33,124,726**	**2.74%**	57.1 million
12	**Assamese**	13,079,696	1.56%	13,168,484	1.28%	**15,311,351**	**1.26%**	15.4 million
13	**Maithili**	7,766,921	0.926%	12,179,122	1.18%	**13,583,464**	**1.12%**	24.2 million
14	Bhili/Bhilodi			9,582,957	0.93%	10,413,637	0.86%	
15	**Santali**	5,216,325	0.622%	6,469,600	0.63%	**7,368,192**	**0.61%**	
16	**Kashmiri**			5,527,698	0.54%	**6,797,587**	**0.56%**	
17	Gondi			2,713,790	0.26%	2,984,453	0.25%	
18	**Nepali**	2,076,645	0.248%	2,871,749	0.28%	**2,926,168**	**0.24%**	16.1 million
19	**Sindhi**	2,122,848	0.253%	2,535,485	0.25%	**2,772,264**	**0.23%**	19.7 million
20	**Dogri**			2,282,589	0.22%	**2,596,767**	**0.21%**	
21	**Konkani**	1,760,607	0.210%	2,489,015	0.24%	**2,256,502**	**0.19%**	
22	Kurukh			1,751,489	0.17%	1,988,350	0.16%	
23	Khandeshi			2,075,258	0.21%	1,860,236	0.15%	
24	Tulu			1,722,768	0.17%	1,846,427	0.15%	
25	**Meitei** (Manipuri)	1,270,216	0.151%	1,466,705^{*}	0.14%	**1,761,079**	**0.15%**	
26	**Bodo**	1,221,881	0.146%	1,350,478	0.13%	**1,482,929**	**0.12%**	
27	Khasi			1,128,575	0.11%	1,431,344	0.12%	
28	Ho			1,042,724	0.101%	1,421,418	0.12%	
29	Garo			1,061,352	0.103%	1,145,323	0.09%	
30	Mundari			889,479	0.086%	1,128,228	0.09%	
31	Tripuri			854,023	0.083%	1,011,294	0.08%	

* Excludes figures of Paomata, Mao-Maram and Purul sub-divisions of Senapati district of Manipur for 2001.
** The percentage of speakers of each language for 2001 has been worked out on the total population of India excluding the population of Mao-Maram, Paomata and Purul subdivisions of Senapati district of Manipur due to cancellation of census results.

=== 100,000 to one million speakers ===
Rank	Language	2001 census	
Rank	Language	Speakers	Percentage
32	Kui	916,222	0.089%
33	Lushai/Mizo	674,756	0.066%
34	Halabi	593,443	0.058%
35	Korku	574,481	0.056%
36	Miri/Mishing	551,224	0.054%
37	Munda	469,357	0.046%
38	Karbi/Mikir	419,534	0.041%
39	Koya	362,070	0.035%
40	Ao	261,387	0.025%
41	Savara	252,519	0.025%
42	Konyak	248,109	0.024%
43	Kharia	239,608	0.023%
44	English	226,449	0.022%
45	Malto	224,926	0.022%
46	Nissi/Dafla	211,485	0.021%
47	Adi	198,462	0.019%
48	Thado	190,595	0.019%
49	Chakma	176,458	0.017%
50	Lotha	170,001	0.017%
51	Coorgi/Kodagu	166,187	0.016%
52	Rabha	164,770	0.016%
53	Tangkhul	142,035	0.014%
54	Kisan	141,088	0.014%
55	Angami	132,225	0.013%
56	Phom	122,508	0.012%
57	Kolami	121,855	0.012%
58	Khond/Kondh	118,597	0.012%
59	Dimasa	111,961	0.011%
60	Ladakhi	104,618	0.010%
61	Sema	103,529	0.010%

== List of mother tongues by number of speakers ==
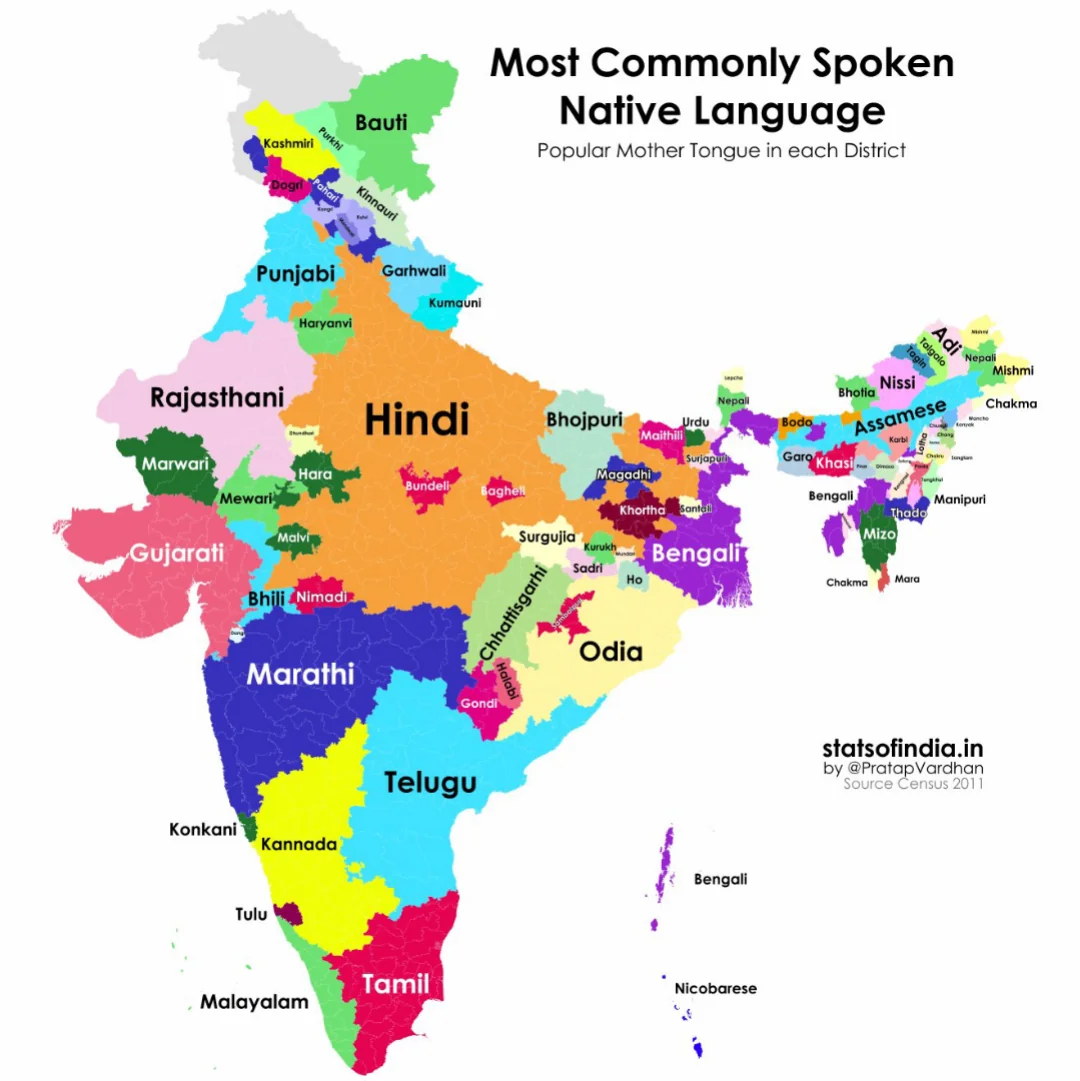
Most commonly spoken native language in India by district, 2011 census

Each of the languages of the 2001 census subsumes one or more mother tongues. Speaker numbers are available for these mother tongues and they are also included in the speaker numbers for their respective language. For example, the language Telugu (with a total of 81,127,740 speakers) includes the mother tongues of Telugu (with 80,912,459 speakers), Vadari (198,020 speakers) and "Others" (17,261 speakers). The General Notes from the 2001 census define "mother tongue" as "the language spoken in childhood by the person's mother to the person. If the mother died in infancy, the language mainly spoken in the person's home in childhood will be the mother tongue."

The following table lists those mother tongues that have more than one million speakers according to the 2011 census:

Mother tongues with more than one million speakers
Rank	Mother tongue	2011 census		Included in language
Rank	Mother tongue	Speakers	Percentage	Included in language
1	Hindi	322,200,000	26.6%	
2	Bengali	96,180,000	7.94%	
3	Marathi	82,800,000	6.84%	
4	Telugu	80,910,000	6.68%	
5	Tamil	68,890,000	5.69%	
6	Gujarati	55,040,000	4.55%	
7	Urdu	50,730,000	4.19%	
8	Bhojpuri	50,580,000	4.18%	Hindi
9	Kannada	43,510,000	3.59%	
10	Malayalam	34,780,000	2.87%	
11	Odia	34,060,000	2.81%	
12	Punjabi	31,140,000	2.57%	
13	Rajasthani	25,810,000	2.13%	Hindi
14	Chhattisgarhi	16,250,000	1.34%	Hindi
15	Assamese	14,820,000	1.22%	
16	Maithili	13,350,000	1.10%	
17	Magahi	12,710,000	1.05%	Hindi
18	Haryanvi	9,807,000	0.810%	Hindi
19	Khortha/Khotta	8,039,000	0.664%	Hindi
20	Marwari	7,832,000	0.647%	Hindi
21	Santali	6,973,000	0.576%	
22	Kashmiri	6,554,000	0.541%	
23	Bundeli/Bundel khandi	5,626,000	0.465%	Hindi
24	Malvi	5,213,000	0.430%	Hindi
25	Sadan/Sadri	4,346,000	0.359%	Hindi
26	Mewari	4,212,000	0.348%	Hindi
27	Awadhi	3,851,000	0.318%	Hindi
28	Wagdi	3,394,000	0.280%	Bhili/Bhilodi
29	Lamani/Lambadi	3,277,000	0.271%	Hindi
30	Pahari (Note: "Pahari" as ambiguous, but in the census returns the language name most commonly comes from the Western Pahari area.)	3,254,000	0.269%	Hindi
31	Bhili/Bhilodi	3,207,000	0.265%	
32	Hara/Harauti	2,944,000	0.243%	Hindi
33	Nepali	2,926,000	0.242%	
34	Gondi	2,857,000	0.236%	
35	Bagheli/Baghel Khandi	2,679,000	0.221%	Hindi
36	Sambalpuri	2,630,000	0.217%	Odia
37	Dogri	2,597,000	0.214%	
38	Garhwali	2,482,000	0.205%	Hindi
39	Nimadi	2,309,000	0.191%	Hindi
40	Surjapuri	2,256,000	0.186%	Hindi
41	Konkani	2,147,000	0.177%	
42	Kumauni	2,081,000	0.172%	Hindi
43	Kurukh/Oraon	1,977,000	0.163%	
44	Tulu	1,842,000	0.152%	
45	Manipuri	1,761,000	0.145%	
46	Surgujia	1,738,000	0.144%	Hindi
47	Sindhi	1,679,000	0.139%	
48	Bagri	1,657,000	0.137%	Punjabi
49	Ahirani	1,636,000	0.135%	Khandeshi
50	Banjari	1,581,000	0.131%	Hindi
51	Brajbhasha	1,556,000	0.129%	Hindi
52	Dhundhari	1,476,000	0.122%	Hindi
53	Bodo/Boro	1,455,000	0.120%	Bodo
54	Ho	1,411,000	0.117%	
55	Gojri/Gujjari/Gujar	1,228,000	0.101%	Hindi
56	Mundari	1,128,000	0.093%	
57	Garo	1,125,000	0.093%	
58	Kangri	1,117,000	0.092%	Hindi
59	Khasi	1,038,000	0.086%	
60	Kachchhi	1,031,000	0.085%	Sindhi
61	Mahasu Pahari	1,000,000	0.081%	

== See also ==
- Languages with official status in India
- List of endangered languages in India
