= Kongai language =

Tangkhulic language of Manipur, India

Kongai
- Native to: India
- Region: Manipur
- Ethnicity: Tangkhul Naga
- Language family: Sino-Tibetan: Tibeto-Burman; Central Tibeto-Burman (?); Kuki-Chin–Naga; Tangkhul–Maring; Tangkhulic; Kongai

Language codes
- ISO 639-3: None (mis)
- Glottolog: kong1298

Kongai is a Tangkhulic language of Ukhrul District, Manipur, India.
