= Chingjaroi =

Chingjaroi Asinei
- village
- Location in Manipur, India Chingjaroi (India)
- Coordinates: 25°23′34″N 94°24′33″E
- Country: India
- State: Manipur
- District: Ukhrul

Population
  - Total: 6,653

Language(s)
  - Official: Tangkhul language
  - Regional: Tangkhul, Asineidi (Chingjaroi language), Poula and khezha among the elders
- Time zone: UTC+5:30 (IST)
- PIN: 795142
- Vehicle registration: MN
- Nearest city: Ukhrul, Kohima
- Literacy: 80%
- Lok Sabha constituency: Outer Manipur
- Vidhan Sabha constituency: Chingai
- Website: manipur.gov.in

Chingjaroi originally known Asinei /Asewnei or Swemi alternatively called Zingchui/Zingjui by the Tangkhul, Shomai by the Poumai and khotsami by the Chakhesangs is a large village located in northern Ukhrul district, Manipur state, India and bordered mainly by villages like Jessami, Tasom, Chingai, Marem, Peh, Phaibung and Laii (Gaziphema)originally. Later villages like Namrei, Razai khunou and Kharasom came to settle in the land of chingjaroi and became its neighboring villages. The village consists of three sister villages, namely, Chingjaroi Khullen, Chingjaroi Khunou and Chingjaroi Christian Village. Chingjaroi Khullen the nearest from the National Highway 150 is approximately 84 kilometers from Ukhrul district headquarters.

== People And Culture ==
The people of the village belong to the Naga Tribe. Farming is the main occupation of the village with other occupations including weaving of basket and shawls and animals husbandry.

The people speak Asineidi/Amashadi language which falls under the Angami-Pochuri languages of the Naga-Kuki-Chin language group. The people of the village are multilingual and the younger generation can speak and understand Tangkhul, Aseineidi, English and Nagamese and Manipuri to some extent. The elder generation can also speak Poula and Khezha.

Because of its unique location and history the village has a unique cultural blend of the Poumai naga, Tangkhul naga and Chakhesang naga tribes.

The village celebrates the festival of Khamor angkhui every year in the month of April. It is a five-day-long festival marked with merrymaking, including exhibition of cultural folk dance and songs, age-old traditional bread making and feasting.the festival was originally called ‘Ankamah Angkhui’. ‘Ankamah’ means ancient and ‘Angkhui’ means festival. Neighbouring Poumai Tribe called it ‘Shomai Daoni/Daonii’, meaning Chingjaroi ancient festival.

Chingjaroi is popular for its eye-catching scenic beauty of tourists' interests, including the Chingjui peak, Akhüro ( Tiger's den ), Japan Kafülokatiu, waterfalls, lovers point, the beautiful terrace fields around the village and many others. It also offers visitors a picture perfect view of scenic poumai region, the Leiniye river and its valley and a glance of Neighbouring Nagaland's mount Saramati and villages under Phek district.

== Total population ==
As per 2015 census, Chingjaroi Khullen village has population of 1825 of which 927 are males while 898 are females as per Population Census 2011.

In Chingjaroi Khullen village population of children with age 0-6 is 272 which makes up 14.90% of total population of village. Average sex ratio of Chingjaroi Khullen village is 969 which is lower than Manipur state average of 985. Child sex ratio for the Chingjaroi Khullen as per census is 1142, higher than Manipur average of 930.

According to 2015 census report, the total population of Chingjaroi Christian Village (CV) is 1280 of 214 households, of which 618 are male and 662 are female. Children in age group 0–6 was 158. The average sex ratio of Chingjaroi CV is 1071 females per 1000 males which is slightly higher than the state average of 985. The literacy rate of the village is 83.42%.

2011 census report records the total population of Chingjaroi Khunou as 548 with 98 households, of which 272 are male and 276 are female. The literacy rate of Chingjaroi Khunou is 68.93%.

Chingjaroi as a whole is flanked by Phaibung in the west, Jessami in the north, Peh in the south and Tusom in the east.
