= Tangkhulic languages =

Group of Sino-Tibetan languages

Tangkhulic
- Geographic distribution: Ukhrul District, Manipur, India; Naga Self-Administered Zone, Myanmar
- Ethnicity: Tangkhul
- Linguistic classification: Sino-Tibetan: Central Tibeto-Burman?; Kuki-Chin–Naga?; Naga?; Tangkhul–Maring; Tangkhulic

Language codes
- Glottolog: sino1246

The Tangkhulic and Tangkhul languages are a group of Sino-Tibetan languages spoken mostly in northeastern Manipur, India. Conventionally classified as "Naga," they are not clearly related to other Naga languages, and (with Maringic) are conservatively classified as an independent Tangkhul–Maring branch of Tibeto-Burman, pending further research.

The Maringic languages appear to be closely related to the Tangkhulic family, but not part of it.

== Languages ==
Tangkhulic languages include:

- Tangkhul (Indian Tangkhul)
- Somra (Burmese Tangkhul)
- Akyaung Ari
- Kachai
- Huishu
- Tusom
- Suansu
- Challow
- Kongai

The Tangkhulic languages are not particularly close to each other. Suansu, Challow, and Kongai were only documented starting from 2019.

Brown's "Southern Tangkhul" (Southern Luhupa?) is a Kuki-Chin rather than Tangkhulic language. It has strong links with the recently discovered Sorbung language, which is also not Tangkhulic despite being spoken by ethnic Tangkhul. some northern villages (Chingjaroi, Jessami, Soraphung Razai) in Tangkhul area have language more closely related to the Angami-Pochuri language group.

Koki, Long Phuri, Makuri, and Para are "Naga" languages spoken in and around Leshi Township, Myanmar. These four languages could possibly classify as Tangkhulic languages or Ao languages.

== Classification ==
Mortensen (2003:5) classifies the Tangkhulic languages as follows.

- Tangkhulic
  - Northern: Huishu
  - North-Central: Champhung
  - East-Central
    - Eastern
      - Kachai
      - Phadāng
    - Central
      - Standard Tangkhul
      - Ukhrul
  - Southern
    - Brown's 'Central Tangkhul'
    - South-Central
      - Khangoi
      - Brown's 'Northern Tangkhul'

== Reconstruction ==
Proto-Tangkhulic, the reconstructed ancestral proto-language of the Tangkhulic languages, has been reconstructed by Mortensen (2012).

Mortensen (2003:5-7) lists the following phonological innovations (sound changes) from Proto-Tibeto-Burman (PTB) to Proto-Tangkhulic.

- PTB *s- > *th-; PTB *ts-, *sy- > *s-
- PTB *dz-, *dzy-, *tsy- > *ts-
- PTB *ky-, *gy- > *ʃ-
- PTB *kr-, *tsy- > *c-
- Neutralization of vowel length distinctions in non-low vowels
- Dissimilation of aspiration in prefixes

Proto-Tangkhulic also has the nominalizing prefix *kV-.

Proto-Tangkhulic lexical innovations are:

- *war ‘mushroom’ (found exclusively in Tangkhulic)
- *kɔ.phuŋ ‘mountain’ (found exclusively in Tangkhulic)
- *kɔ.mi ‘to give’ (found exclusively in Tangkhulic)
- *khaj ‘fish’ (also found in some Zeme and Angami languages)
- *pan ‘hand’ (also found in some Zeme languages)
- *pej ‘foot’ (also found in some Zeme and Angami languages)
