= Challow language =

Tangkhulic language of Manipur, India

Challow
- Native to: India
- Region: Manipur
- Ethnicity: Tangkhul Naga
- Language family: Sino-Tibetan: Tibeto-Burman; Central Tibeto-Burman (?); Kuki-Chin–Naga; Tangkhul–Maring; Tangkhulic; Challow

Language codes
- ISO 639-3: None (mis)
- Glottolog: chal1279

Challow is a Tangkhulic language of Ukhrul District, Manipur, India.

== Typology ==
Challow is a tonal language with SOV word order, agglutinative morphology, and ergative-absolutive alignment.
