= Naga Morich =

Variety of chili pepper

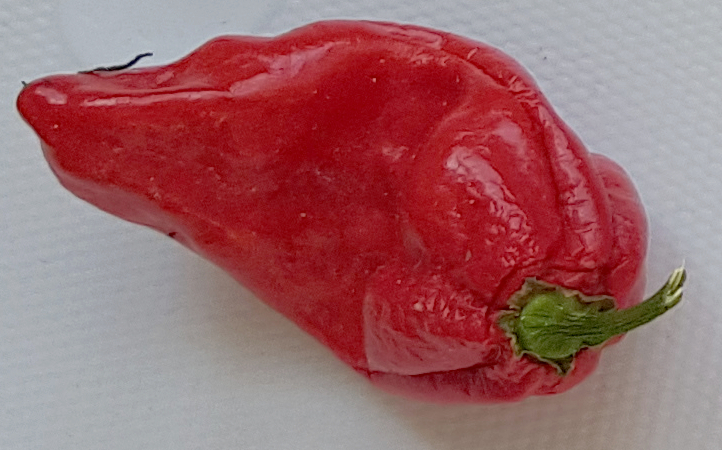

- Heat: Exceptionally hot
- Scoville scale: SR: >800,000 SHU

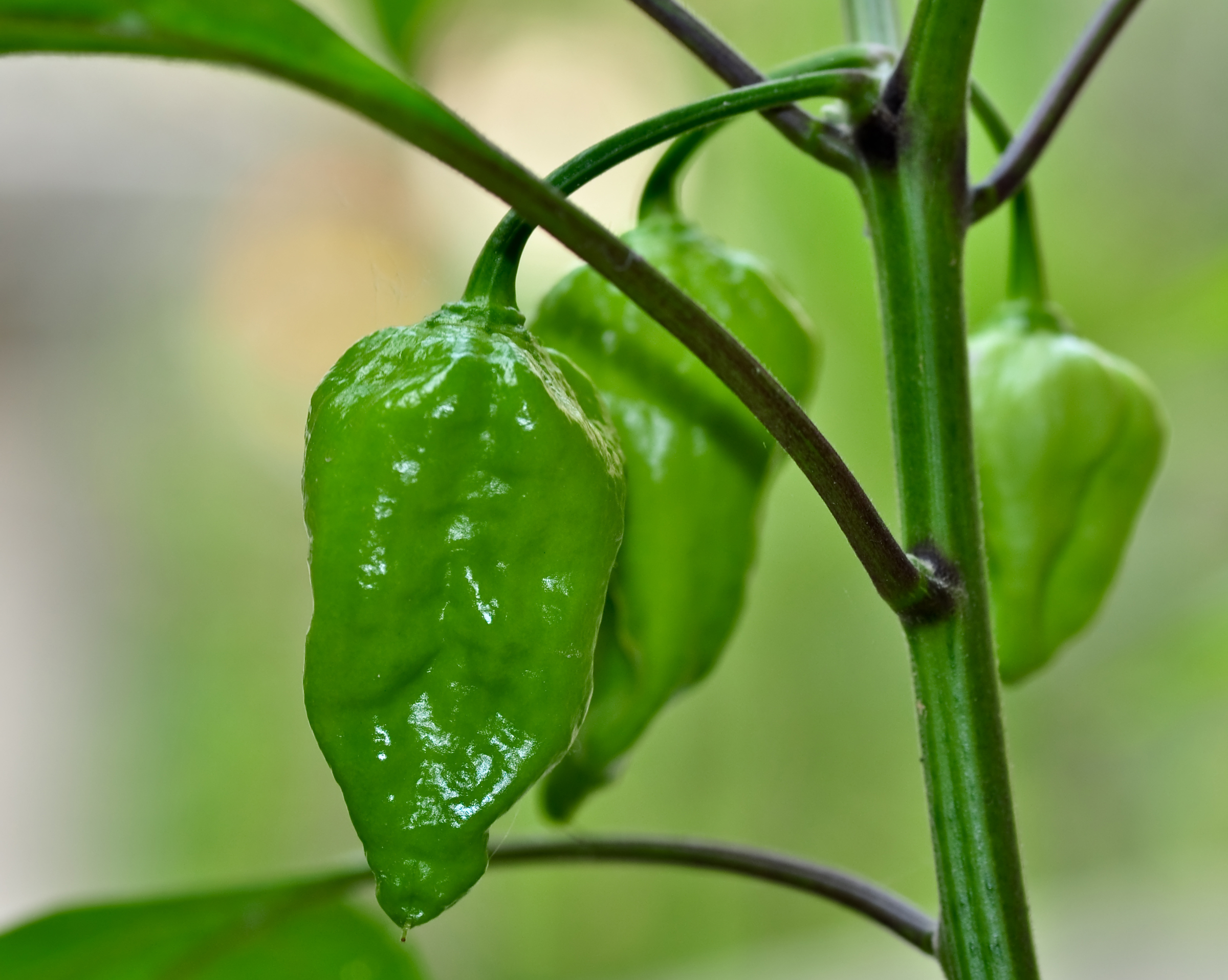
Unripe peppers on plant

The Naga Morich is a chili pepper originally grown primarily in Nagaland Northeast India and later farmed in Bangladesh . It is also one of the hottest known naturally occurring chilli peppers and measures 800,000 SHU on Scoville scale.

Morich is the word for chilli pepper in Bengali (মরিচ), Nepali, Hindi (मिर्च) and the languages of Nagaland and Manipur. In Nagaland the pepper is known as chaiberachi in the Zeliangrong dialect and chudi chusi in the Angami dialect, both meaning "king of chillies".

"Naga Mircha" was registered under the Geographical Indications (GI) of Nagaland by Government of India from 2007.

== Plant characteristics ==
The Naga Morich is a small-medium shrub with large leaves, with small five-petaled flowers, and blisteringly hot fruit. It differs from the Bhut Jolokia and Bih Jolokia, in that it is slightly smaller with a pimply ribbed texture as opposed to the smoother flesh of the other two varieties.

== Use ==
In Nagaland, the pepper has culinary, medicinal, and cultural uses.

== Distribution ==
The Naga is a species found in Bangladesh and Northeastern India, more specifically in Nagaland, Manipur and Assam.

They are also grown in the United States, United Kingdom (as subspecies Dorset Naga) and Australia for the production of hot sauces, and in Finland, where it is mainly sold fresh in supermarkets.

== Cultivars ==
The pepper has been used to create multiple superhot cultivars. American breeder Ed Currie used the Naga Morich to create the hybrid Carolina Reaper chili pepper cultivar in the race to grow the hottest chili pepper. It was also used in the creation of the Dorset Naga and the Naga Viper.

== See also ==
- Ghost pepper, another superhot naturally occurring chili
