= Suansu language =

Tangkhulic language of Manipur, India

Suansu
- Native to: India
- Region: Manipur
- Ethnicity: Tangkhul Naga
- Native speakers: 2000 (2023)
- Language family: Sino-Tibetan: Tibeto-Burman; Central Tibeto-Burman (?); Kuki-Chin–Naga; Tangkhulic (?); Suansu

Language codes
- ISO 639-3: None (mis)
- Glottolog: suan1234

Suansu is a Sino-Tibetan language of Manipur, India, first reported in 2019. It is spoken by approximately 2,000 people in several villages of Ukhrul District, Manipur.

== Classification ==
The classification of Suansu within the Kuki-Chin–Naga languages is uncertain. It may be a Tangkhulic language.

== Resources ==
- Lexibank data (GitHub)
- Lexibank data (Zenodo)
