= Makury language =

Naga language spoken in India and Myanmar

Makury
- Makury Naga
- Native to: India; Myanmar
- Region: Nagaland
- Ethnicity: Makury Naga
- Native speakers: 65,000 (2014-16)
- Language family: Sino-Tibetan: (Tibeto-Burman); Ao? Tangkhulic?; Makury

Language codes
- ISO 639-3: jmn
- Glottolog: maku1273

Makury, or Makury Naga (sometimes spelled Makuri), is a Naga language of India and Myanmar. Shi (2009:3) and Saul (2005:25) suggest that Makury may be an Ao language. The Makury dialects share 93% lexical similarity.

== Classification ==
Makury is not close to other Naga languages that fall under Konyak-[Tangshang] and Angami-Zeme. Makury falls under the proposed Ao-Tangkhul linguistic group of southern Naga languages and is close to Naga languages that fall under said language group.Longpfxrx (Longphuri) Naga and para (jaijairai)Naga tribes. In Eastern Nagaland and Myanmar, the Makury, Somra Tangkhul and Para are closer than the other tribes in the north in terms of language (Makury Tribal Council). Makury shares 30%–37% lexical similarity with Long Phuri Naga, and 17%–19% with Para Naga

Hsiu (2021) classifies Makury as a sister of the Central Naga (Ao) languages.

== Geographical distribution ==
Makury is spoken in Leshi Township, Homalin Township, and Lahe Township in Hkamti District, Sagaing Region, Myanmar. There are about 40,000 speakers in Myanmar, and about 25,000 in India.

== Dialects ==
Ethnologue lists the following dialects of Makury.

- Mëkheotlë
- Sengphüvlë
- Aralë
- Jilë

Jongphüvlë (listed as Kyaungphuri in Ethnologue) is a Makury clan name (Makury Tribal Council).

Shi (2009:5) lists the following dialects of Makury.

- Phuvle, Makheotle
- Sengphuvle, Muvle, Jeile
