= Kachai-Padang language =

Sino-Tibetan language spoken in India

Kaachai-Phadāng
- Native to: India
- Region: Manipur
- Ethnicity: Tangkhul Naga
- Native speakers: 3,000 in Kachai village (2003)
- Language family: Sino-Tibetan: Tibeto-Burman; Central Tibeto-Burman (?); Kuki-Chin–Naga; Tangkhul–Maring; Tangkhulic; Kaachai-Phadāng

Language codes
- ISO 639-3: –
- Glottolog: phad1238

The language of the neighboring villages of Kaachai and Phadāng (Phalee) in Manipur, India, constitute a Tangkhulic language. It is spoken by about 3,000 people in Kachai village, west-central Ukhrul District. Phadāng (Phalee) is only attested from 1859.
