= NJH =

NJH or njh may refer to:

- NJH, the Telegraph code for Nanjing railway station, Jiangsu, China
- njh, the ISO 639-3 code for Lotha language, Nagaland, India
