= Somra language =

Sino-Tibetan language spoken in Burma

Somra
- Tangkhul
- Native to: Myanmar
- Ethnicity: Tangkhul Naga
- Native speakers: 4,000 (2004)
- Language family: Sino-Tibetan: Tibeto-Burman; Central Tibeto-Burman (?); Kuki-Chin–Naga; Tangkhul–Maring; Tangkhulic; Somra

Language codes
- ISO 639-3: ntx
- Glottolog: None

Somra (after its literary dialect), also known as Burmese Tangkhul (Tangkhul Naga), is a Sino-Tibetan language spoken in Myanmar. The two ethnic Tangkhul languages are related, but are not mutually intelligible, being only 30% lexically similar. Somra is closer to Akyaung Ari.

Somra is spoken in Somra tract, Leshi Township and Homalin Township of Sagaing Division, Myanmar.
