= Huishu language =

Tangkhulic language spoken in India

Huishu
- Native to: India
- Region: Manipur
- Ethnicity: Tangkhul Naga
- Language family: Sino-Tibetan: Tibeto-Burman; Central Tibeto-Burman (?); Kuki-Chin–Naga; Tangkhul–Maring; Tangkhulic; Huishu

Language codes
- ISO 639-3: None (mis)
- Glottolog: nort3286

Huishu is a Tangkhulic language spoken in Huishu village, Ukhrul District, Manipur, India (Mortensen 2004).
