= Khangoi language =

Sino-Tibetan language of India

Khangoi
- Southern Tangkhulic
- Region: Manipur or Nagaland
- Ethnicity: Tangkhul Naga
- Language family: Sino-Tibetan: Tangkhulic; Khangoi

Language codes
- ISO 639-3: nmf (included)
- Glottolog: khan1277

Khangoi (Khunggoi) is a Sino-Tibetan language of the Tangkhulic branch. The dialect of the namesake Khangoi village is quite similar to what Brown (1837) labeled 'Northern' and 'Central' Tangkhul, labels which don't match current geographical descriptions.
