= Champhung language =

Tangkhulic language of India

Champhung
- Native to: India
- Region: Manipur
- Ethnicity: Tangkhul Naga
- Language family: Sino-Tibetan: Tangkhulic; Champhung

Language codes
- ISO 639-3: None (mis)
- Glottolog: nort3287

Champhung is a Tangkhulic language known only from a wordlist provided by Brown (1837).
