= NQY =

NQY, or nqy, may refer to:

- NQY, the IATA code for Newquay Airport, the main commercial airport for Cornwall, England
- nqy, the ISO 639-3 code for the Akyaung Ari language
- NQY, the National Rail code for Newquay railway station, Cornwall, England
