= Challow =

Challow may refer to:

- Challow, a rice dish in Afghan cuisine
- West Challow, Oxfordshire, England
- East Challow, Oxfordshire, England
- Challow railway station, former railway station
- Challow language, a Sino-Tibetan language of Manipur, India

== See also ==
- Challow Novices' Hurdle, British horse race
