= Haoreima =

Meitei goddess of Tangkhul tribal origin

- diseases, illnesses, souls and spirits
- Member of Meitei deities
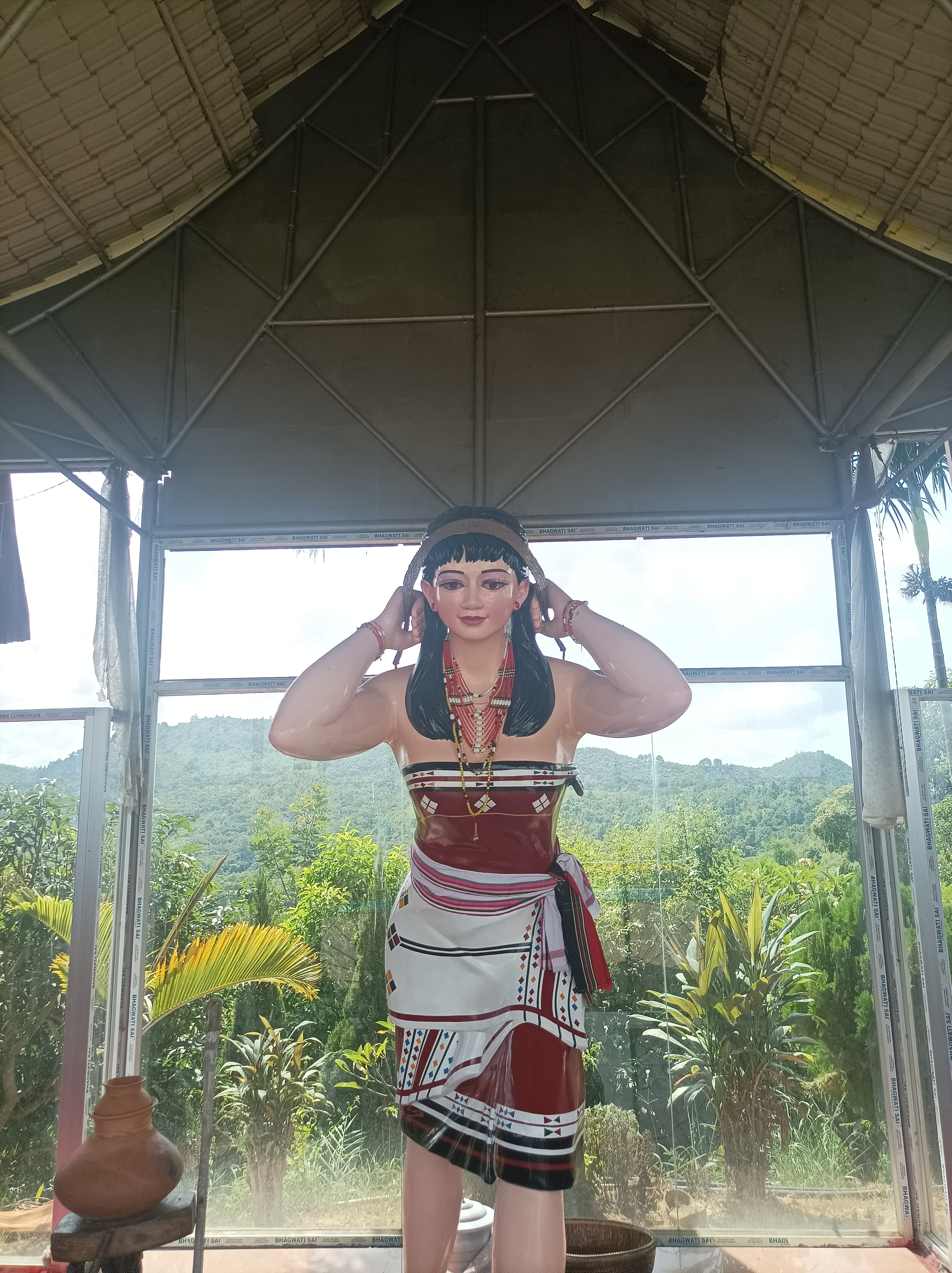
- A sculpture of Haoreima in Tangkhul costume, in a shrine in the Kakching Garden, Kakching district, Manipur
- Other names: Haoma Liklang Saphabi, Haorang Leisang Saphabi, Lara Lasangnu, Luirala, Haoleima, Haoleipi, Haoreibi, Haonupi, Haonubi, Hauleima, Haureima, Hauleipi, Haureibi, Haunupi, Haunubi
- Affiliation: Meitei mythology (Manipuri mythology) and traditional Meitei religion (Sanamahism)
- Major cult centre: Kakching
- Abode: Kakching
- Symbol: Basket
- Gender: Female
- Region: Manipur
- Ethnic group: affiliated to Meitei people; originated from the Tangkhul people.

Genealogy
- Died: Kakching

Haoreima (Meitei: ꯍꯥꯎꯔꯩꯃ, lit. 'tribal lady') or Haoleima (Old Manipuri: ꯍꯥꯎꯂꯩꯃ) is a goddess of tragic love and separation in Meitei mythology and Sanamahism, the indigenous religion of Manipur. According to some legends, she was a woman from the hills, who died unable to meet her lover, and turned into a tortured spirit. She is regarded as an incarnation of Goddess Panthoibi. She is also identified with the goddess Nongthang Leima.

== Identities ==
She is also worshipped as goddess Ireima, an incarnation of the goddess Panthoibi. She is one of the most revered Meitei goddesses although originated from the Tangkhul people, she is not a goddess but rather a historical figure, daughter of a tribal village chief. As well as being the goddess of tragic love and separation is also regarded as the goddess of diseases, souls and spirits.

== Deification ==
Haoreima was the daughter of Khelemba, a Tangkhul chief of Chingdai village. She was already married to Khamlangba, a Tangkhul chief of Chingshong village. Despite marrying Khamlangba, she had a secret love affair with King Meidingu Tabungba, also known as Tabung Saphaba (1359-1394 CE). Her lover had an untimely death. Traumatized by his death, Haoreima went to the Kanglei Pungmayol (in modern day Imphal). Later, after her death, she is worshipped as a goddess.

== See also ==
- Nongthang Leima
