= Yawpami =

Yawpami Lapin, Matong or Rawparmee
- Village
- Location in Burma
- Coordinates: 25°37′37″N 95°01′31″E
- Country: Burma
- Region: Sagaing Region
- District: Naga Self-Administered Zone
- Township: Leshi
- Elevation: 1,200 m (4,100 ft)
- Time zone: UTC+6.30 (MST)

Yawpami is a village in Leshi Township in the Naga Self-Administered Zone in Sagaing Region of northwestern Burma. It lies 15 km to the northeast of Amimi and about 30 km southwest of Salem.
