= Englan =

- Village
- Location in Nagaland, India Englan (India)
- Coordinates: 26°10′23″N 94°15′3″E
- Country: India
- State: Nagaland

Languages
  - Official: English
- Time zone: UTC+5:30 (IST)
- Vehicle registration: NL
- Website: nagaland.gov.in

Englan is a subdivision in the district of Wokha, in the Nagaland state of India. Its name literally means The Path of the Sun. It is one of the main centers of the district and is an active center of the Lotha language and culture.
