= Kuki-Chin–Naga languages =

Geographic language cluster

Kuki-Chin–Naga
- (geographic / cultural)
- Geographic distribution: South Asia and Southeast Asia
- Linguistic classification: Sino-Tibetan: Central Tibeto-Burman; Kuki-Chin–Naga
- Subdivisions: Kuki-Chin; Naga; Meitei; Karbi

Language codes
- Glottolog: kuki1245

The Kuki-Chin–Naga languages are a geographic clustering of languages of the Sino-Tibetan family in James Matisoff's classification used by Ethnologue, which groups it under the non-monophyletic "Tibeto-Burman". Their genealogical relationship both to each other and to the rest of Sino-Tibetan is unresolved, but Matisoff lumps them together as a convenience pending further research.

The languages are spoken by the ethnically related Naga people of Nagaland, the Chin people of Myanmar, and the Kuki people. The larger among these languages have communities of several tens of thousands of native speakers, and a few have more than 100,000, such as Mizo (674,756 in India as of 2001), Thadou (350,000) or Lotha language (179,000).

"Kuki" and "Chin" are essentially synonyms, whereas the Naga speak languages belonging to several Sino-Tibetan branches.

== Languages ==
The established branches are:

- Kuki-Chin
  - Northwestern Kuki- ("Old Kuki")
  - Northern Kuki-Chin (also called Northeastern)
  - Central Kuki-Chin
  - Maraic
  - Khomic
  - Southern Kuki-Chin
- Naga
  - Ao, in north-central Nagaland
  - Angami–Pochuri, in southern Nagaland
  - Tangkhul-Maring, in eastern Manipur
  - Zemeic, in northwestern Manipur
- Meitei, the official language of Manipur
- Karbi, in Karbi Anglong, Central Assam

The Konyak languages of Nagaland, also spoken by ethnic Naga, are not grouped within Kuki-Chin–Naga, but rather within Brahmaputran (Sal).

Ethnologue adds Koki, Long Phuri, Makuri, and Para, all unclassified, and all distant from other Naga languages they have been compared to. Koki is perhaps closest to (or one of) the Tangkhulic languages, and the other three may belong together.

== Classification ==
Scott DeLancey (2015) considers Kuki-Chin–Naga to be part of a wider Central Tibeto-Burman group.

The following is a preliminary internal classification of the Kuki-Chin–Naga languages by Hsiu (2021).

- Northern Kuki-Chin-Naga linguistic area (linkage)
  - Greater Central Naga
    - Makury
    - Long Phuri
    - Para (Jejara)
    - Central Naga
      - Lotha
      - Sangtam
      - Yimchungrü
      - Ao
  - Angami-Pochuri
    - Angamic-Sumic
      - Angamic
        - Angami, Chokri
        - Khezha
        - Mao
        - Poumai
      - Sumic
        - Sumi
        - Rengma
    - Pochuric
      - Meluri
      - Ntenyi
- Southern Kuki-Chin-Naga branch
  - Greater Zeme ("Western Naga")
    - Zeme, Mzieme
    - Lianglad
    - Nruanghlat
    - Maram
    - Khoirao
    - Puiron
  - Greater Tangkhulic
    - Akyaung Ari
    - Tangkhulic
  - Maring, Khoibu (Uipo)
  - Kokak
  - Suansu (?)
  - Southern Naga
  - Kuki-Chin
    - Northern
    - Central
    - Maraic
    - Southern
    - Khomic
