= Tusom language =

Tangkhulic language of Manipur, India

Tusom
- Native to: India
- Region: Manipur
- Ethnicity: Tangkhul Naga
- Language family: Sino-Tibetan: Tibeto-Burman; Central Tibeto-Burman (?); Kuki-Chin–Naga; Tangkhul–Maring; Tangkhulic; Tusom
- Dialects: East Tusom

Language codes
- ISO 639-3: –

Tusom is a Tangkhulic language of Manipur, India. Dialects include East Tusom (Mortensen 2013). Tusom was first mentioned in the literature by David Mortensen in the 2000s.

== Sources ==
- Mortensen, David R. and James A. Miller (2013). “A reconstruction of Proto-Tangkhulic rhymes.” Linguistics of the Tibeto-Burman Area 36(1): 1-32.
- Mortensen, David R. (2012). Database of Tangkhulic Languages. (unpublished ms. contributed to STEDT).
- Mortensen, David R. and James A. Miller (2009). “Proto-Tangkhul Onsets in Comparative Perspective.” International Conference on Sino-Tibetan Languages and Linguistics 42, Chiangmai, November 4.
- Mortensen, David R. (2003). “Comparative Tangkhul.” Unpublished Qualifying Paper, UC Berkeley.
- Mortensen, David. 2014. The Tangkhulic Tongues - How I Started Working on Endangered Languages.
