= T. Senka Ao =

Indian journalist (born 1945)

T. Senka Ao (born 6 June 1945) is a journalist from the Indian state of Nagaland. Senka Ao is best known for his work as the Editor-in-Chief of the "Ao Milen", the first newspaper in Nagaland established in 1933 and the first newspaper ever to be published in the local Ao language. During the period of his editorship, Senka Ao created the "Alokba" character famous for his witty commentary on social and current issues. Senka Ao has contributed several articles to various publications and has authored nine books in the Ao language. Two of his books Kongro Lijen (The Abode of the Maidens) and Kishi Tezulen (Off the Doorway) are in the process of translation into English. Senka Ao's books have been included in the syllabus of the Ao language in ICSE and ISC Board New Delhi, and up to class 10 under Nagaland Board of School Education. He is an examiner of Arrangtet Examination which is the highest Ao language degree.

Senka Ao has a played key roles in the efforts to bring peace and harmony between warring groups during many crises and feuds. He has served as a member of the Peace Committee constituted to solve the issues involving Aos and Sumis in 1981 and also as a member of Peace Committee 1985 during the confrontation between Assam and Nagaland at Merapani. He was actively involved in the formation of the Joint People Forum with representatives from both Nagaland and Assam in collaboration with the District Administration for the resolution of the contentious issues between Nagaland and Assam. In recognition of his many social activities, he was elected as a member of the Mokokchung Town Committee and as a member of the All India Radio Campaign Committee in Mokokchung in 1972.

== Early life ==
Senka Ao was born in Mokokchung Town in Nagaland on June 6, 1945. He completed matriculation from Government High School, Mokokchung and graduated in 1969 from St Anthony's College, Shillong, then under Gauhati University. He had been a very active participant in public life since his student's days holding several positions in various students' organisations. He was the Joint Secretary in the Voluntary Adult Education Campaign in Mokokchung District (1975–1979) and was the founder of the Model Night School at Mokokchung in 1972.

== Recognitions ==
- Recipient of Nagaland Governor's Award in Literature in the year 2016.
- In the year 2022, Govt of India conferred the Padma Shri award, the third highest award in the Padma series of awards, on T Senka Ao for his distinguished service in the field of literature and education. The award is in recognition of his service as a "Tribal Ao Author, Teacher and Journalist - preserving Nagaland's Ao language through his writings over decades".
