= Para Naga =

Jejara Naga

Languages
- Para language

Related ethnic groups
- Tangkhul Naga, Makury Naga

The Para people, also known as the Para Naga, are a Tibeto-Burmese ethnic group inhabiting mostly in the Naga Self-Administered Zone in Myanmar. They are one of the major Naga peoples of Myanmar and mostly inhabit the area around Lay Shi Township.
