= Koki language =

Sino-Tibetan language of Burma

Koki
- Koki Naga
- Native to: Burma
- Native speakers: 2,000 (2004)
- Language family: Sino-Tibetan: Tangkhulic? Ao?; Koki

Language codes
- ISO 639-3: nxk
- Glottolog: koka1245

Koki (Konke, Kokak), or Koki Naga, is an unclassified Sino-Tibetan language spoken in Burma. Speakers are included under the wider Naga ethnicity. It has been documented in Shintani (2018).

== Classification ==
Koki is currently unclassified within Tibeto-Burman. Ethnologue (21st edition) notes that Koki shares 19%–32% lexical similarity with Tangkhul Naga in Myanmar, 23% with Akyaung Ari Naga, and 22%–24% with Jejara Naga.

== Distribution ==
It is spoken in 10 villages of southern Leshi Township, Hkamti District, Sagaing Region, Myanmar.

== Sources ==
- Barkman, Tiffany. 2014. A descriptive grammar of Jejara (Para Naga). MA thesis, Chiang Mai: Payap University.
