= Long Phuri language =

Sino-Tibetan language spoken in Burma

Long Phuri
- Long Phuri Naga
- Native to: Burma
- Native speakers: 1,000 (2004)
- Language family: Sino-Tibetan: (Tibeto-Burman); Ao? Tangkhulic?; Long Phuri

Language codes
- ISO 639-3: lpn
- Glottolog: long1375

Long Phuri, or Long Phuri Naga (Amimi Naga, Longpfuri, Longpfuru, Mimi), is an unclassified Naga language of Burma. Long Phuri is spoken in 6 villages of Leshi Township, Hkamti District, Sagaing Region, Myanmar.

It is not close to other Naga languages which it has been compared to, though Long Phuri Naga, Makuri Naga, and Para Naga may be closest to each other. Hsiu (2021) classifies Long Phuri as a sister of the Central Naga (Ao) languages. Long Phuri shares 30%–37% lexical similarity with Makuri Naga, and 23%–25% with Para Naga.
