= Ntenyi language =

Pochuri language of Nagaland, India

Ntenyi
- Northern Rengma
- Native to: India
- Region: Nagaland
- Ethnicity: Rengma Naga
- Native speakers: (13,000 cited 1997)
- Language family: Sino-Tibetan: Central Tibeto-Burman?; Kuki-Chin–Naga?; Angami–Pochuri; Pochuri; Ntenyi

Language codes
- ISO 639-3: nnl
- Glottolog: nort2725
- ELP: Northern Rengma Naga

Ntenyi, or Northern Rengma, is a cluster of Angami–Pochuri languages spoken in Nagaland, India. It is spoken in northern Rengma, Kohima district, Nagaland.
