= Sorbung language =

Sino-Tibetan language spoken in India

Sorbung
- Region: Manipur
- Ethnicity: Tangkhul Naga
- Native speakers: 300 (2011)
- Language family: Sino-Tibetan: Kuki-Chin?; Sorbung

Language codes
- ISO 639-3: None (mis)
- Glottolog: sorb1250

Sorbung is a Sino-Tibetan language spoken in Manipur, northeastern India. Although the speakers are ethnically Tangkhul, it appears to be a non-Tangkhulic Kuki-Chin language, as it shows strong links with what was called 'Southern Tangkhul' in Brown (1837), which was also a non-Tangkhulic language spoke by ethnic Tangkhul.

Sorbung is spoken by about 300 people of Sorbung village, Ukhrul District, Manipur, northeastern India. Sorbung speakers consider themselves to be ethnic Tangkhul. A language that is unambiguously Tangkhulic is spoken in nearby Tusom village. Kuki (Thadou) and Maring are also spoken in neighboring villages.

== See also ==
- Southern Luhupa language
