= Akyaung Ari language =

Tangkhulic language of Myanmar

Akyaung Ari
- Native to: Myanmar
- Ethnicity: Tangkhul Naga
- Native speakers: 1,000 (2004)
- Language family: Sino-Tibetan: Tibeto-Burman; Central Tibeto-Burman (?); Kuki-Chin–Naga; Tangkhul–Maring; Tangkhulic; Akyaung Ari

Language codes
- ISO 639-3: nqy
- Glottolog: None

Akyaung Ari, or Ngachan, is a Tangkhulic language spoken in Myanmar. It is most closely related to Somra. It is spoken in Heinkut, Jagram, and Ngachan villages of Leshi Township, Sagaing Division, Myanmar. Ngachan shares 52% lexical similarity with Tanghkul Naga of Somra, 23% with Tangkhul Naga of Ukhrul in India, and 23% with Koki Naga.
