= Mzieme language =

Sino-Tibetan language of India

Mzieme
- Northern Zeme
- Native to: India
- Region: Nagaland
- Ethnicity: Zeme Naga
- Native speakers: (29,000 cited 1997)
- Language family: Sino-Tibetan: Tibeto-Burman; Central Tibeto-Burman languages (?); Kuki-Chin-Naga; Zemeic; Mzieme

Language codes
- ISO 639-3: nme
- Glottolog: mzie1235
- ELP: Mzieme Naga

Mzieme is a Sino-Tibetan language spoken in India. It has been called Northern Zeme due to its lack of official recognition, but is not particularly close to Zeme.

Mzieme is spoken to the northeast of Zeme in Peren district, southeastern Nagaland, as well as in Senapati district, Manipur.
