= Rengma language =

Angami–Pochuri language of Nagaland, India

Rengma
- Southern Rengma
- Native to: India
- Region: Nagaland
- Ethnicity: Rengma Naga
- Native speakers: (21,000 cited 1997); 65,300 total Rengma (2011 census)
- Language family: Sino-Tibetan: Central Tibeto-Burman?; Kuki-Chin–Naga?; Naga?; Angami–Ao?; Angami–Pochuri; Pochuri? Rengma–Sümi?; Rengma

Language codes
- ISO 639-3: nre
- Glottolog: sout2732
- ELP: Southern Rengma Naga

Rengma, or Southern Rengma, is an Angami–Pochuri language spoken in Nagaland, India.

== Names ==
Alternate names and dialect names of Rengma include Injang, Moiyui, Mon, Mozhumi, Nzong, Nzonyu, Rengma, Rengma Naga, Southern Rengma, Unza and Western Rengma (Ethnologue).

== Dialects ==
Ethnologue reports the following dialects of Rengma.

- Keteneneyu
- Azonyu (Nzonyu, Southern Rengma)

Tseminyu is the principal dialect main center. Southern Rengma and Northern Rengma are reportedly inherently unintelligible.

== Geographical distribution ==
Ethnologue reports the following locations for Rengma.

- Tseminyü District, west-central Nagaland
- 15 villages of Karbi Anglong District, Assam
- Manipur
