= Inpui language =

Sino-Tibetan language spoken in India

Inpui
- Kabui, Puiron
- Inpui chong
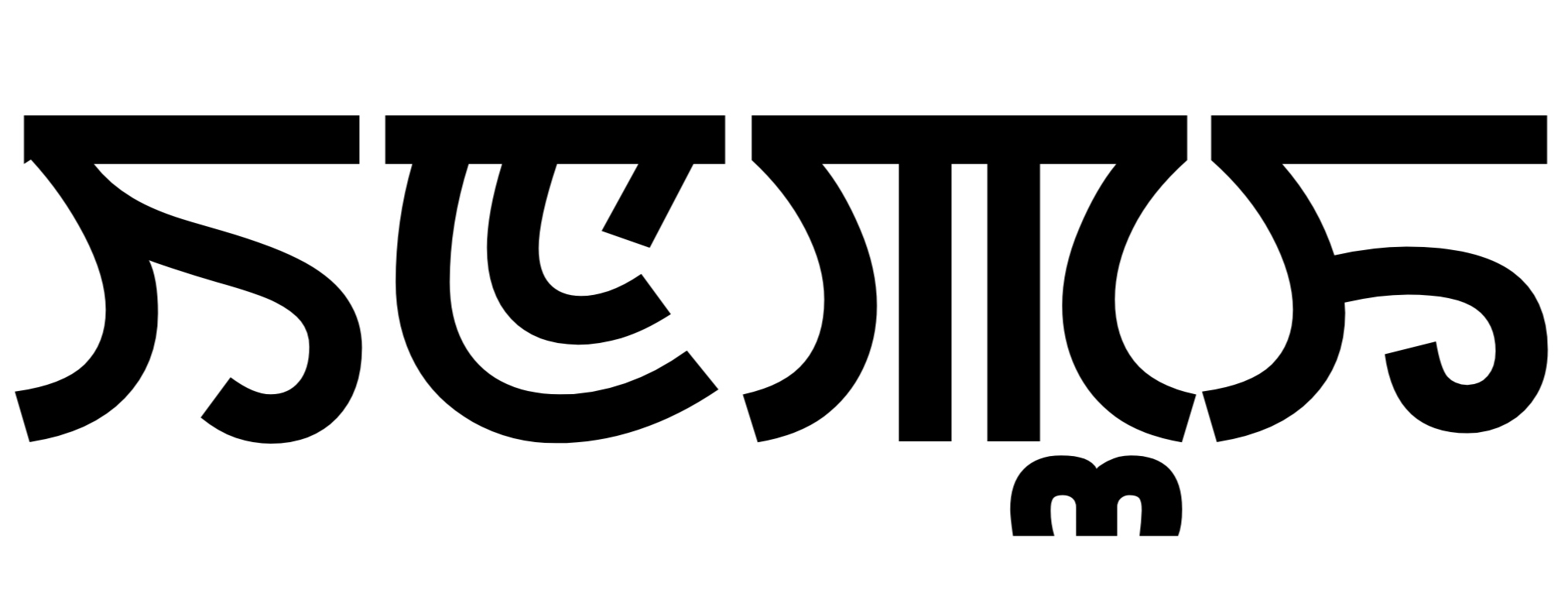
- Inpui written in Meitei script
- Native to: India
- Region: Manipur, Nagaland, Assam
- Ethnicity: Inpui Naga
- Native speakers: (29,000 cited 2001 census)
- Language family: Sino-Tibetan: Tibeto-Burman; Central Tibeto-Burman (?); Kuki-Chin-Naga; Zemeic; Inpui

Language codes
- ISO 639-3: nkf
- Glottolog: inpu1234
- ELP: Puiron

Inpui or Puiron is a Naga language spoken in different villages of Senapati district, Tamenglong district, Noney District, and Imphal district in Manipur, and in some areas in Nagaland, India. Speakers of Inpui and Rongmei are subsumed under single ethnic group Kabui. But the two major ethnic groups have different languages and identity. Even though they are considered to be cognate ethnic group. The speakers of this language use Meitei language as their second language (L2) according to the Ethnologue.

== Language varieties ==
Kabui was originally called Inpui, but Rongmei in Imphal valley also used the name Kabui. Rongmei in the hills did not use the name.

Inpui chong and Rongmei are sometimes considered to be the same language, despite being mutually unintelligible and only 68% lexically similar. The Inpui-speaking people are mainly concentrated in the Tamenglong district of Manipur, especially in the Haochong areas, which is a cluster of about 10 villages.

Inpui speakers also reside in Tamenglong headquarters, Noney areas, Makuilongdi and Senapati headquarters in Senapati district and three Inpui villages namely Changangei, Yurembam and Tamphagei in Imphal valley. The Inpui-speaking people are also found in the Peren and Dimapur district of Nagaland. The most similar dialect with Inpui among the ethnic groups living in Manipur is the Kom dialect.
