= Tangkhul–Maring languages =

Tangkhul–Maring
- Geographic distribution: Nagaland
- Linguistic classification: Sino-Tibetan: Central Tibeto-Burman?; Kuki-Chin–Naga?; Naga?; Tangkhul–Maring
- Subdivisions: Tangkhulic; Maringic

Language codes
- Glottolog: tang1335

The Tangkhul–Maring languages are a putative small family of Sino-Tibetan languages spoken in eastern Manipur of northeast India and Southwestern Sagaing in Myanmar. Conventionally classified as "Naga", they are not clearly related to other Naga languages, and are conservatively classified as an independent branch of Sino-Tibetan, pending further research.

== Languages ==
Tangkhulic languages include:

- Tangkhul
- Somra
- Akyaung Ari
- Kachai
- Huishu
- Tusom

The Maringic languages are:

- Maring
- Uipo
