= Para language =

Naga language spoken in Burma and India

Para
- Jejara
- Jaijairai
- Pronunciation: [dʑɨ́dʑɨ̀ɹɨ̀]
- Native to: Burma
- Ethnicity: Para Naga
- Native speakers: 1,500 (2004)
- Language family: Sino-Tibetan: (Tibeto-Burman); Ao? Tangkhulic?; Para

Language codes
- ISO 639-3: pzn
- Glottolog: para1302
- ELP: Para

Para or Para Naga (autonym: Jejara; also called Bara, Parasar), is an unclassified Naga language of India and Burma. It is not close to other Naga languages which it has been compared to, though Para Naga, Long Phuri Naga, and Makuri Naga may be closest to each other, with Para the most distinct. Barkman (2014) notes that Para Naga could possibly be an Ao or Tangkhulic language. Saul (2005) classifies Para Naga as an Ao language. Hsiu (2021) classifies Para as a sister of the Central Naga (Ao) languages.

Para is spoken in 7 villages of Leshi Township, Hkamti District, Sagaing Region, Myanmar.

The Para Naga varieties share 83%–93% lexical similarity. Para is 23%–25% lexically similar to Long Phuri Naga and 17%–19% to Makuri Naga.
