= Sangtam language =

Naga language spoken in northeast India

Sangtam
- Thukumi, Sangtam Naga
- Lophomi
- Native to: Nagaland, India
- Region: East-central Nagaland, Tuensang and Khiphire districts
- Ethnicity: Sangtam
- Native speakers: 76,000 (2011 census)
- Language family: Sino-Tibetan: Tibeto-Burman; Central Tibeto-Burman (?); Kuki-Chin–Naga; Central Naga; Sangtam

Language codes
- ISO 639-3: nsa
- Glottolog: sang1321

Sangtam, also called Thukumi, Isachanure, or Lophomi, is a Naga language spoken in northeast India. It is spoken in Kiphire District and in the Longkhim-Chare circle in Tuensang district, Nagaland, India.

== Dialects ==
Ethnologue lists the following dialects of Sangtam.

- Kizare
- Pirr (Northern Sangtam)
- Phelongre
- Thukumi (Central Sangtam)
- Photsimi
- Purr (Southern Sangtam)

The standardized dialect of Sangtam is based on the Tsadanger village speech variety.

== Phonology ==
Sangtam is unusual in having two stops with bilabial trilled release, /t̪͡ʙ̥, t̪͡ʙ̥ʰ/, which contrast with each other phonemically.

Consonants
		Labial	Dental/ Alveolar	Retroflex	Palatal	Velar	Glottal
Nasal		m	n		ɲ	ŋ (Note: The velar nasal /ŋ/ is in free variation with a null realization [∅] syllable-finally when preceded by a nasalized vowel.)	
Plosive	plain	p	t̪	ʈʵ	c	k (Note: The unaspirated velar plosive /k/ is realized as a glottal stop [ʔ] in coda position.)	
Plosive	aspirated	pʰ	t̪ʰ	ʈʰʵ	cʰ	kʰ	
Affricate	plain	t̪͡ʙ̥ (Note: The trill in unaspirated /t̪͡ʙ̥/ is typically voiced as [t̪͡ʙ] when word-medial.)	t̪͡s		t͡ʃ		
Affricate	aspirated	t̪͡ʙ̥ʰ	t̪͡sʰ		t͡ʃʰ		
Fricative	voiceless	(f)	s		ʃ	x	h
Fricative	voiced	v	z				
Approximant			l	ɻ	j		

Vowels
	Front	Back
Close	i	u
Close-mid	e	o
Open/ Open-mid	a	ʌ

All vowels can have high, mid, or low tone.
