= Lotha language =

Sino-Tibetan language spoken in India

Lotha
- Native to: India
- Region: Wokha district, Nagaland
- Ethnicity: Lotha Naga
- Native speakers: 179,000 (2011 census)
- Language family: Sino-Tibetan: Central Tibeto-Burman?; Kuki-Chin–Naga?; Naga?; Angami–Ao?; Central Naga; Lotha

Language codes
- ISO 639-3: njh
- Glottolog: loth1237
- ELP: Lotha Naga

The Lotha language is a Sino-Tibetan language spoken by approximately 179,000 people in Wokha district of west-central Nagaland, India. It is centered in the small district of Wokha (capital Wokha). This district has more than 114 villages such as Pangti, Maraju (Merapani), Englan, Baghty (Pakti) and others, where the language is widely spoken and studied.

== Names ==
Alternate names include Chizima, Choimi, Hlota, Kyong, Lhota, Lotha, Lutha, Miklai, Tsindir, and Tsontsii (Ethnologue).

== Dialects ==
Ethnologue lists the following dialects of Lotha.

- Live
- Tsontsü
- Ndreng
- Kyong
- Kyo
- Kyon
- Kyou

In the Linguistic Survey of India, linguist George Abraham Grierson analyzed various branches of languages in India and categorized various Naga languages into three groups: Western Naga, Eastern Naga, and Central Naga. Lotha falls into the Central Naga group, which also includes the languages Ao, Sangtam, and Yimkhiungrü.

== Phonology ==
=== Consonants ===
		Labial	Dental/ Alveolar	Palatal	Velar	Glottal
Plosive	voiceless	p	t		k	ʔ
Plosive	aspirated	pʰ	tʰ		kʰ	
Affricate	voiceless	p͡f	t͡s	t͡ʃ		
Affricate	vd./aspirated	p͡v	t͡sʰ	t͡ʃʰ		
Fricative	voiceless	f	s	ʃ		h
Fricative	voiced	v	z	ʒ		
Nasal	voiced	m	n	ɲ	ŋ	
Nasal	aspirated	mʰ	nʰ	ɲʰ	ŋʰ	
Lateral	voiced		l			
Lateral	aspirated		lʰ			
Trill	voiced		r			
Trill	aspirated		rʰ			
Approximant	voiced	w		j		
Approximant	aspirated			jʰ		

- /v/ when followed by /o/ can also be heard as [w] in free variation.
- The pronunciation of the trills /r, rʰ/ may vary as approximants [ɹ, ɹʰ] or a retroflex fricative [ʐ] among speakers.
- /j/ only occurs as phonemically aspirated as /jʰ/ among other dialects.
- Plosives /p, k/ can be heard as unreleased [p̚, k̚] in word-final position.

=== Vowels ===
	Front	Central	Back
Close	i		u
Mid	e	ə	o
Open		a	

- When /u/ follows a labial consonant or /k, kʰ/, the consonant is then affricated and /u/ is realized as unrounded [ɯ]. The result is then from /ku, kʰu, pu, pʰu/ to [kvɯ, kfɯ, pvɯ, pfɯ].
- /i/ may also tend to centralize and lower as [ɨ, ə] in open syllables when following sibilant sounds (/ʃi/ ~ [ʃɨ~ʃə]).
- /ə/ may also range in pronunciation to a back sound [ɯ].
- /i, u/ can also be heard shortened as [ɪ, ʊ] within the first syllable.

== Orthography and literature ==
Lotha is written in the Latin script, introduced by the British and American missionaries in the late 19th century. It is a medium of education up to the post-graduate level in the state of Nagaland. It is also the language in which the church sermons are preached. The Bible has been translated into the Lotha language, adding significantly to its vocabulary, which had an influence of Assamese and Hindi.

== Grammar ==
There have been two grammatical sketches of Lotha published to date. The first of these was an outline grammar by W. E. Witter originally published in 1888. A revised edition of Witter's grammar with updated usage examples contributed by Francis Kikon was published in 1999. Independently, K. P. Acharya published another grammar of Lotha in 1983.

=== Noun morphology ===
==== O-prefixed nouns ====
Some Lotha nouns have a prefix o- that is omitted when the noun is modified by a pronoun. For example, oki "house" yields a ki "my house" and ni ki "your house" when modified by the pronouns a "I" and ni "you" respectively.

==== Case marking ====
Lotha possesses case marking for noun phrases, marked by a case marker following a noun phrase. However, the accusative case, nouns modifying others in a genitive relationship, and indirect objects do not take any case markers.

Nouns and pronouns that serve as a subject are marked for the nominative case with following particle na, regardless of whether the verb is transitive or intransitive. Alternatives to this particle include yio in the first person and no in the second person.

Na (albeit with different tone) is also the instrumental marker. Witter's grammar calls this marker "ablative" instead of instrumental.

Acharya gives three allative case markers, with -i and -lo for inanimate nouns, and -thingi for animate nouns.

For the ablative case, it is expressed by stacking the instrumental marker na after the appropriate allative marker.

=== Verb morphology ===
Lotha verbs are marked for tense, aspect, and the imperative mood, but are not marked for person nor number.

Lotha marks for three tenses with suffixes, namely the present (-(a)la), past (-cho), and future (-v).

Aspect markers such as -thak- (perfect), -van- (imperfective) intervene between the verb root and the tense markers.

Verbs are negated by prefixing the marker n- (or ün) to the verb.

The imperative mood is marked by the suffixes -ta or -a.

=== Pronouns ===
Basic personal pronouns in Lotha are as follows:

Lotha personal pronouns
Person	Singular	Plural
1st	a	e
2nd	ni	nte
3rd	ombo "he" ompvü "she"	onte

=== Syntax ===
Lotha's basic word order is subject–object–verb. Typically a sentence consists of a subject and a predicate, although the subject is omitted in imperative sentences.

Lotha is also a zero copula language, so that if one wishes to say that a noun phrase is identical to another noun phrase, or takes on the quality marked by an adjective, no verb is used.

Lotha interrogative sentences come in two forms, yes/no questions and wh-questions. Yes/no questions are formed by appending a question particle at the end of the sentence, either alo or la. Wh-questions, on the other hand, are formed with a wh-word preceding the verb.

== Lotha Yi Tsüngon ==
Various Lotha Naga groups have started observing May 1 as its language day, Lotha Yi Tsüngon. In 2025 simultaneous events were organised by the Kohima Lotha Hoho, Lotha Hoho Dimapur, and Lotha Academy (Wokha) where an anthology of Lotha prose, Lotha Motsüran Ekhvürhyucho was released.
