= Tangkhul language =

Sino-Tibetan language spoken in India

Tangkhul
- Luhupa
- Native to: India
- Region: Manipur, Nagaland
- Ethnicity: Tangkhul people
- Native speakers: (140,000 cited 2001)
- Language family: Sino-Tibetan: Tibeto-Burman; Central Tibeto-Burman (?); Kuki-Chin–Naga; Tangkhul–Maring; Tangkhulic; Tangkhul
- Dialects: Ukhrul; Kupome (Luhupa); Phadang
- Writing system: Latin script

Language codes
- ISO 639-3: nmf
- Glottolog: tang1336
- ELP: Tangkhul Naga

Tangkhul is a Sino-Tibetan language of the Tangkhulic branch, spoken in different villages of Ukhrul district, Manipur, India.

Tangkhul became a written language for the first time in the year 1897, when William Pettigrew compiled "Tangkhul Primer and Catechism", during his Christian missionary activities.

The Department of Language Planning and Implementation of the Government of Manipur offers a sum of ₹5,000 (equivalent to ₹8,500 or US$88 in 2023), to every individual who learns Tangkhul language, under certain terms and conditions.

Tangkhul shares 93%–94% lexical similarity with the Somra variety of Tangkhul, 31% with Tangkhul Naga spoken in India, 51%–52% with Akyaung Ari Naga, and 29%–32% with Koki Naga.

== Phonology ==
=== Consonants ===
		Labial	Dental/ Alveolar	Palatal	Velar	Glottal
Nasal		m	n		ŋ	
Plosive/ Affricate	voiceless	p	t	tʃ	k	ʔ
Plosive/ Affricate	aspirated	pʰ	tʰ		kʰ	
Fricative	voiceless	f	s			h
Fricative	nasalized		s̃			
Fricative	voiced		z			
Rhotic			r			
Approximant		ʋ	l	j	w	

- Stop sounds /p t tʃ k/ may have voiced allophones [b d dʒ ɡ] in free variation.
- /m/ may be heard as [ɱ] when preceding /f/ or /ʋ/.
- /r/ can be heard as [r] or [ɾ] in free variation.

=== Vowels ===
	Front	Central	Back
Close	i	ɨ	u
Mid	e	ə	o
Open	a		

- /i e a u/ can have allophone sounds of [ɪ ɛ ɐ ɯ] in free variation.
