= Leshi Township =

- Township
- Location in Naga SAZ

- Location in Sagaing Region

- Location in Burma
- Coordinates: 25°27′N 94°57′E
- Country: Burma
- Region: Sagaing Region
- District: Naga Self-Administered Zone
- Capital: Leshi
- Time zone: UTC+6.30 (MST)

Leshi Township or Layshi Township (Burmese: လေရှီးမြို့နယ်) is a mountainous township located within the Naga Self-Administered Zone of Sagaing Region, Myanmar. It is also part of the Naga Self-Administered Zone. The principal town is Leshi.

There is a major road under construction down from Lashi to the Chindwin River at Tamanthi in Homalin Township.

In 2010, a portion of Hkamti Township in the Naga Hills, including the Naga village of Yawpami, was transferred to Leshi Township, to facilitate the creation of the Naga Self-Administered Zone.

== Communities ==
Among the towns and villages in Leshi Township are Amimi (Ahmimi), Heirnkut (Heinkwet), Kholar, Naungkatiat (Naungkantlant), Ngacham (Ngakyan), Pansat (Panset), Sainolin (Saungnoelin), Saungkin (Sonkin), Somra (Sumnarar), Tsera and Yawpami (Rawparmee).

== Languages ==
Various Ao languages and Tangkhulic languages are spoken in Leshi Township.

- Somra language
- Akyaung Ari language
- Kuki language
- Long Phuri language
- Makury language
- Para language
