= Angami–Pochuri languages =

Family of Sino-Tibetan languages

Angami–Pochuri
- Geographic distribution: Nagaland
- Linguistic classification: Sino-Tibetan: Central Tibeto-Burman?; Kuki-Chin–Naga?; Naga?; Angami–Ao?; Angami–Pochuri
- Subdivisions: Angami; Pochuri; Rengma–Sümi?

Language codes
- Glottolog: anga1286

The Angami–Pochuri languages are a small family of Sino-Tibetan languages spoken in southern Nagaland and Northern Manipur of northeast India. Conventionally classified as "Naga", they are not clearly related to other Naga languages, and are conservatively classified as an independent branch of Sino-Tibetan, pending further research.

== Languages ==
- Angami–Pochuri
  - Angami languages
    - Angami
    - Chokri (Chokri Chakhesang)
    - Kuzhami
    - Sopvoma (Mao)
    - Poula (Poumai)
  - Pochuri languages
    - Pochuri
    - Ntenyi (Northern Rengma)
    - Rengma
    - Sümi (Sema)

Rengma–Simi might form a third branch according to Burling (2003).
