= Zemeic languages =

Sino-Tibetan language spoken in India

Zemeic
- Zeliangrong; Western Naga
- Geographic distribution: India
- Linguistic classification: Sino-Tibetan: Tibeto-Burman; Central Tibeto-Burman (?); Kuki-Chin-Naga; Zemeic

Language codes
- Glottolog: zeme1241

The Zemeic, Zeliangrong or Western Naga are a languages branch of Sino-Tibetan languages spoken mostly in Indian state of Nagaland, Assam and Manipur in northeast India. It may have close relationship with other Naga languages pending further research. The corresponding ethnic group is the Zeliangrong people. There were 63,529 Zemeic-speaking people in Nagaland state of India in 2011.

Ethnologue gives the name Western Naga for the Zemeic languages.

== Languages ==
The Zemeic languages are:

- Zeme
- Lianglad
- Ruanglat
- Mzieme (Northern Zeme)
- Puiron
- Khoirao (Thangal)
- Maram

The Zeme and Rongmei language clusters are close enough to sometimes be considered dialects of a single Zeliang language.

Van Driem (2011) lists the varieties, from south to north, as:

Mzieme, Khoirao, Maram, Puiron, Zeme (also known as Empeo Naga, Kacha Naga, Kochu Naga), Nruanghmei (also known as Rongmei, Kabui), Liangmai (also known as Kwoireng)

(Inpui and Puimei, which are sometimes listed, are not distinct.)
