= Pochuri language =

Sino-Tibetan language spoken in India

Pochuri
- Native to: India
- Region: Nagaland
- Ethnicity: Pochuri Naga
- Native speakers: 21,654 (2011 census)
- Language family: Sino-Tibetan: Angami–Pochuri; Pochuri
- Dialects: Pochuri; Maluri

Language codes
- ISO 639-3: npo
- Glottolog: poch1243
- ELP: Pochuri Naga

Pochuri, or Pochuri Naga, is a Naga language spoken in Nagaland, India.

According to Ethnologue, Pochuri is spoken in 27 villages of Meluri subdivision, Phek district, southeastern Nagaland. There are also some speakers in Ukhrul district, Manipur (Ethnologue).

Maluri (Meluri), which is often considered a dialect of Pochuri, may be a distinct language.
