= Central Naga languages =

Sino-Tibetan language family of India

Central Naga
- Ao
- Geographic distribution: Nagaland, India
- Ethnicity: Ao Naga, Lotha Naga, Sangtam Naga, Yimkhiung Naga
- Linguistic classification: Sino-Tibetan: Tibeto-Burman; Central Tibeto-Burman (?); Kuki–Chin–Naga; Central Naga
- Proto-language: Proto-Central Naga
- Subdivisions: Chungli Ao; Mongsen Ao; Changki Ao; Sangtam ('Thukumi'); Yimkhiungrü ('Yachumi'); Lotha (Lhota)

Language codes
- Glottolog: aoic1235

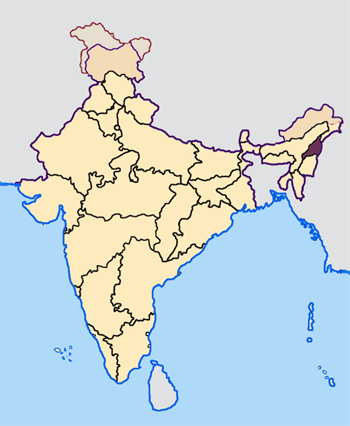
Nagaland in India

The Central Naga or Ao languages are a small family of Sino-Tibetan languages spoken by various Naga peoples of Nagaland in northeast India. Conventionally classified as "Naga", they are not clearly related to other Naga languages, and are conservatively classified as an independent branch of Sino-Tibetan, pending further research. There are around 607,000 speakers of the languages in total.

Coupe (2012) considers the Angami–Pochuri languages to be most closely related to Ao as part of a wider Angami–Ao group.

== Languages ==
The following languages are widely accepted as Central Naga languages:

- Ao language
  - Chungli Ao
  - Mongsen Ao
  - Changki Ao
- Sangtam ('Thukumi')
- Yimkhiungrü ('Yachumi')
- Lotha (Lhota)

There are also various undescribed Ao varieties including Yacham and Tengsa, which may turn out to be separate languages (see Mongsen Ao).

The following "Naga" languages spoken in and around Leshi Township, Myanmar are classified as Ao languages ("Ao-Yimkhiungrü") by Saul (2005).

- Koki
- Makury
- Long Phuri
- Para

Hsiu (2021) places Makury, Long Phuri, and Para into a Greater Central Naga branch, but excludes Koki (Kokak).

- Greater Central Naga
  - Makury
  - Long Phuri
  - Para (Jejara)
  - Central Naga
    - Lotha
    - Sangtam
    - Yimchungrü
    - Ao

Bruhn (2014:370) also surmises that Makury may be an Ao language.

Bruhn (2014) uses the term Central Naga to refer to all of the languages above, and uses the Ao to refer to only two languages, namely Chungli Ao and Mongsen Ao. The internal structure of Bruhn's Central Naga group is as follows.

Central Naga

- Lotha
- Sangtam
- Yimkhiungrü
- Ao
  - Chungli Ao
  - Mongsen Ao

Coupe (2023) suggests that Wui, a recently described divergent language of eastern Nagaland, is likely a divergent Aoic (i.e., Central Naga) language.

== Reconstruction ==
Proto-Central Naga, the proto-language of this family, has been reconstructed by Bruhn (2014).

Bruhn (2014:363) identifies the following four sound changes from Proto-Tibeto-Burman (PTB) to Proto-Central Naga (PCN) as sound changes that are characteristic of the Central Naga branch.

1. PTB *-a(ː)w, *-əw, *-ow, *-u > PCN *-u(ʔ) ‘back diphthong merger’
2. PTB *-r > PCN *-n ‘*r-coda nasalization’
3. PTB *-s > PCN *-t ‘*s-coda occlusivization’
4. PTB *-i(ː)l, *‑al, *‑uːl > PCN *‑ə(ʔ) ‘*l-rime erosion’

=== Reflexes of consonants ===
The following reflexes of initial consonants are known:

Central Naga reflexes of initial consonants
Initial consonant		Ao		Lotha	Sangtam	Yimchungrü
Initial consonant		Chungli	Mongsen	Lotha	Sangtam	Yimchungrü
Plosives	*p	p	p	p	p	p
Plosives	*t	t	t	t	t	t
Plosives	*k	k	k	k	k	k
Plosives	*ph	p	pʰ	pʰ	pʰ	pʰ
Plosives	*th	t	tʰ	tʰ	tʰ	tʰ
Plosives	*kh	k	kʰ	kʰ	kʰ	kʰ
Sibilants	*s	s	s	th	s	s
Sibilants	*z	z	z	z	z	z
Sibilants	*ʃ	s	s	s	ʃ	ʃ
Sibilants	*ʒ	j	z	z	?	?
Affricates	*ts	tʃ	tʃ	ts	ts	ts
Affricates	*tʃ	tʃ	tʃ	tʃ	tʃ	tʃ
Affricates	*tsh	s	tʃʰ	tsʰ	tsʰ	tsʰ
Affricates	*tʃh	s	tʃʰ	tʃʰ	tʃʰ	tʃ
Other fricatives	*ɣ	h	h	h	v	h
Other fricatives	*h	(lost)	h	h	h	h
Liquids and glides	*l	l	l	l	l	l
Liquids and glides	*hl	l	l̥	?	?	l
Liquids and glides	*r	ɹ	ɹ	r	r	r
Liquids and glides	*hr	ɹ	ɹ̥	r̥	r, ɣ	r, r̥
Liquids and glides	*w	(lost)	w	v	v	(lost)
Liquids and glides	*hw	w	ʍ	h	h	h
Liquids and glides	*j	j	j	j	j	j
Liquids and glides	*hj	(lost)	j̥	j	ʃ	h?

== See also ==
- Ao Naga
- Lotha Naga
- Sangtam Naga
- T Senka Ao
- Yimkhiung Naga
