= Khoirao language =

Sino-Tibetan language of India

Khoirao
- Thangal Naga
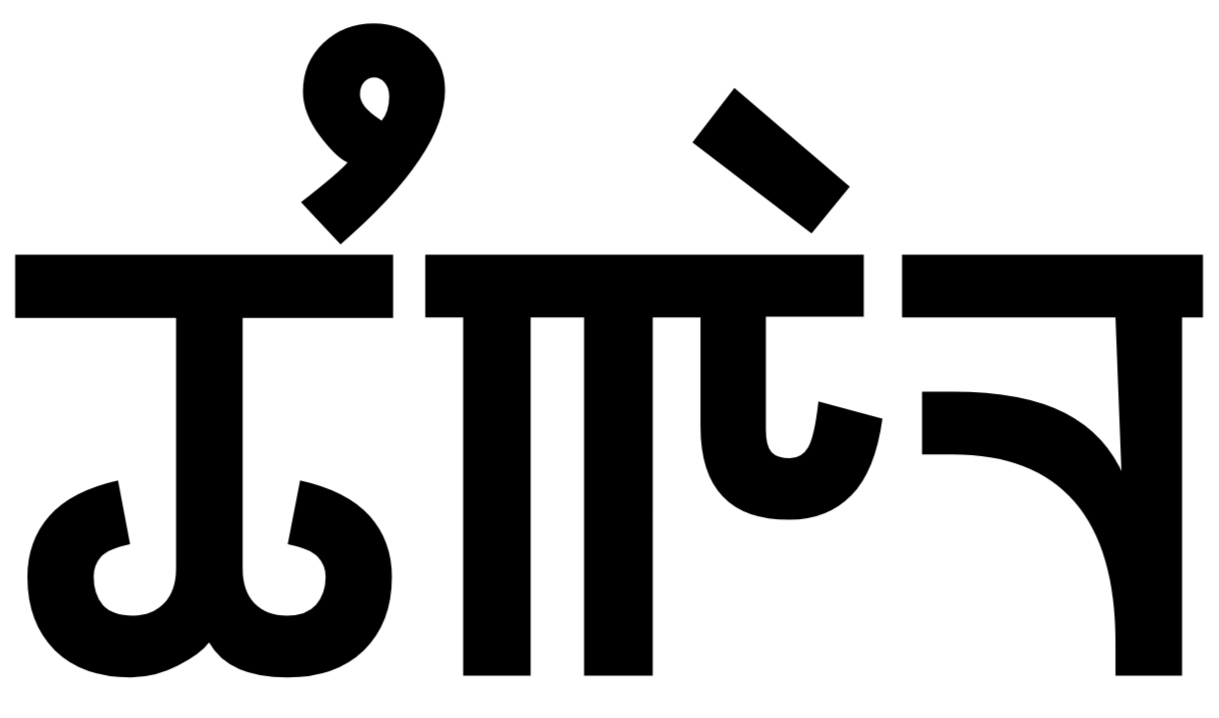
- Thangal written in Meitei script
- Region: Manipur, Assam
- Ethnicity: Thangal people
- Native speakers: (24,000 cited 2001)
- Language family: Sino-Tibetan: Zemeic languages; Khoirao

Language codes
- ISO 639-3: nki
- Glottolog: than1255
- ELP: Thangal Naga

Khoirao, also known as Thangal, is a Sino-Tibetan language spoken in Manipur, India. It belongs to the Zemeic branch.

The speakers of this language use Meitei language as their second language (L2) according to the Ethnologue.

== Geographical distribution ==
Khoirao is spoken in the East and West Sadar hills subdivisions, Senapati district, northern Manipur, in the villages of Mapao Thangal, Thangal Surung, Makeng Thangal, Tumnoupokpi, Yaikongpao, T-Khullen, Ningthoubam, Mayangkhang, and Angkailongdi. Most villages located are east of the Barak valley.
