= Angami language =

Sino-Tibetan language native to the Naga Hills

Angami
- Native to: India
- Region: Nagaland
- Ethnicity: Angami Naga
- Native speakers: 150,000 (2011 census)
- Language family: Sino-Tibetan: Tibeto-Burman; Central Tibeto-Burman (?); Kuki-Chin–Naga; Angami–Pochuri; Angami
- Writing system: Latin

Language codes
- ISO 639-3: njm
- Glottolog: anga1288
- Angami is classified as Vulnerable by the UNESCO Language Vitality and Endangerment framework

Angami, also called Tenyidie, is a Naga language spoken in the Naga Hills in the northeastern part of India, in Kohima district, Nagaland. In 2011, there is an estimate of 153,000 first language (L1) Angami speakers. Under the UNESCO's Language Vitality and Endangerment framework, Angami is at the level of "vulnerable", meaning that it is still spoken by most children, but "may be restricted to certain domains".

== Documentation ==
A wealth of Angami grammars, lexicons are available in Tenyidie and in English. However, these collections often conflict in their analysis of the phonemic or syntactic nature of the language. This is due to the difference at the time of the documentation, and the choice of informants from varying dialect. Especially in the earlier language documentations (1870s–1960s), mostly by Christian missionary; their informants' meta-data were not specified and any dialect of Angami were assumed to be the "standard" of Angami within the Nagaland region. The Angami-English Phrasebook and Angami-English-Hindi dictionary available online.

=== Text collection ===
The complete Tenyidie bible was published in 1970. However, only the translated chapter of Genesis from the bible was posted on the internet under The Rosetta Project. Also, Christian devotional materials such as The Bible...Basically® in Tenyidie are also available online.

Another source of text is largely from the ethnic folktales (e.g. Angami Naga folklore by Sekhose, 1970) and especially from song lyrics written in Tenyidie. Other than Christian songs written by the Angami church community (e.g. Shieshülie songbook by Baptist Revival Church), the rising rock music culture started to stir in the Nagaland as the music events and societies like the Hornbill National Rock Contest

The next largest source of Tenyidie is the educational materials used in the Kohima schools and university. Although much of these texts are in printed forms, a query on the web does retrieve some Indian exams papers that contain test questions on Tenyidie.

== See also ==
- Angami Naga
- Tibetic languages
