= Sümi language =

Sino-Tibetan language spoken in India

Sümi
- Sümi (Naga)
- Pronunciation: [sɨ˧ mi˩]
- Native to: India
- Region: Nagaland
- Ethnicity: Sümi Naga
- Native speakers: 240,000 approx.(2011)
- Language family: Sino-Tibetan: Angami–Pochuri; Sümi

Language codes
- ISO 639-3: nsm
- Glottolog: sumi1235
- ELP: Sumi Naga

Sümi, also Sema, is a Sino-Tibetan language spoken in Nagaland, India. It is spoken by the Sümi Naga people. It differs from every other Naga languages due to the presence of guttural sounds.

According to the 2011 Census of India, the Sümi Naga had a Scheduled Tribe population of 236,313 in Nagaland.

== Geographical distribution ==
Sümi is spoken in central and southern Nagaland, mainly in Zünheboto District. There are also good number of speakers in parts of Niuland, Dimapur, Chümoukedima and Kiphire District(s), as well as in 7 villages of Tinsukia District, Assam (Ethnologue).

== Dialects ==
Ethnologue lists the following dialects of Sümi.

- Dayang (Western Sümi)
- Lazami
- Jimomi
- Zumomi

== Phonology ==
The transcriptions in this section use the International Phonetic Alphabet.

=== Vowels ===
Monophthongs of Sema, from Teo (2012:368)

The vowels of Sümi are as follows:

	Front	Central	Back
Close	i	ɨ	u
Mid	e		o
Open		a	

Notes:

- The close front and the close central vowels have been variously described as near-close [i̞, ɨ̞] and close [i, ɨ]. The close back vowel has only been described as close [u].
  - In the word-medial position, /ɨ/ can be realized as mid [ə].
- The mid vowels /e, o/ can be realized as either close-mid [e, o] or open-mid [ɛ, ɔ].
  - Teo (2012) describes the close-mid allophone of /o/ as slightly advanced [o̟].
- /a/ has been variously described as near-open [ɐ] and open [ä].
  - After uvular stops, /a/ can be realized as open back unrounded [ɑ].

=== Consonants ===
The consonants of Sümi are as follows:

		Labial	Alveolar	Palatal	Velar	Uvular	Glottal
Nasal	plain	m	n		ŋ		
Nasal	aspirated	mʱ	nʱ				
Plosive	voiceless	p	t		k	q	
Plosive	aspirated	pʰ	tʰ		kʰ	qʰ	
Plosive	voiced	b	d		ɡ		
Affricate	voiceless		tʃ ~ ts				
Affricate	aspirated		tʃʰ ~ tsʰ				
Fricative	voiceless	f	ʃ ~ s		x		h
Fricative	voiced	v ~ w	ʒ ~ z		ɣ		
Approximant		v ~ w	ɹ	j			
Lateral	plain		l				
Lateral	aspirated		lʱ				

==== Allophones ====
1. /ʃ~s, ʒ~z/ are realized [t͡ɕ~ɕ~t͜ʃ, d͡ʑ~ʑ~d͡ʒ] before /i, e/

== Bibliography ==
- Sreedhar, Mangadan Veetil (1976), Sema phonetic reader, Mysore: Central Institute of Indian Languages
- Sreedhar, Mangadan Veetil (1980), A Sema Grammar, Mysore: Central Institute of Indian Languages
- Teo, Amos B. (2012), "Sumi (Sema)", Journal of the International Phonetic Association, 42 (3): 365–373, doi:10.1017/S0025100312000254
- Teo, Amos B. (2014), A phonological and phonetic description of Sumi, a Tibeto-Burman language of Nagaland, Canberra: Asia-Pacific Linguistics, ISBN 978-1-922185-10-5
