= Tangkhul people =

Ethnic group of South Asia

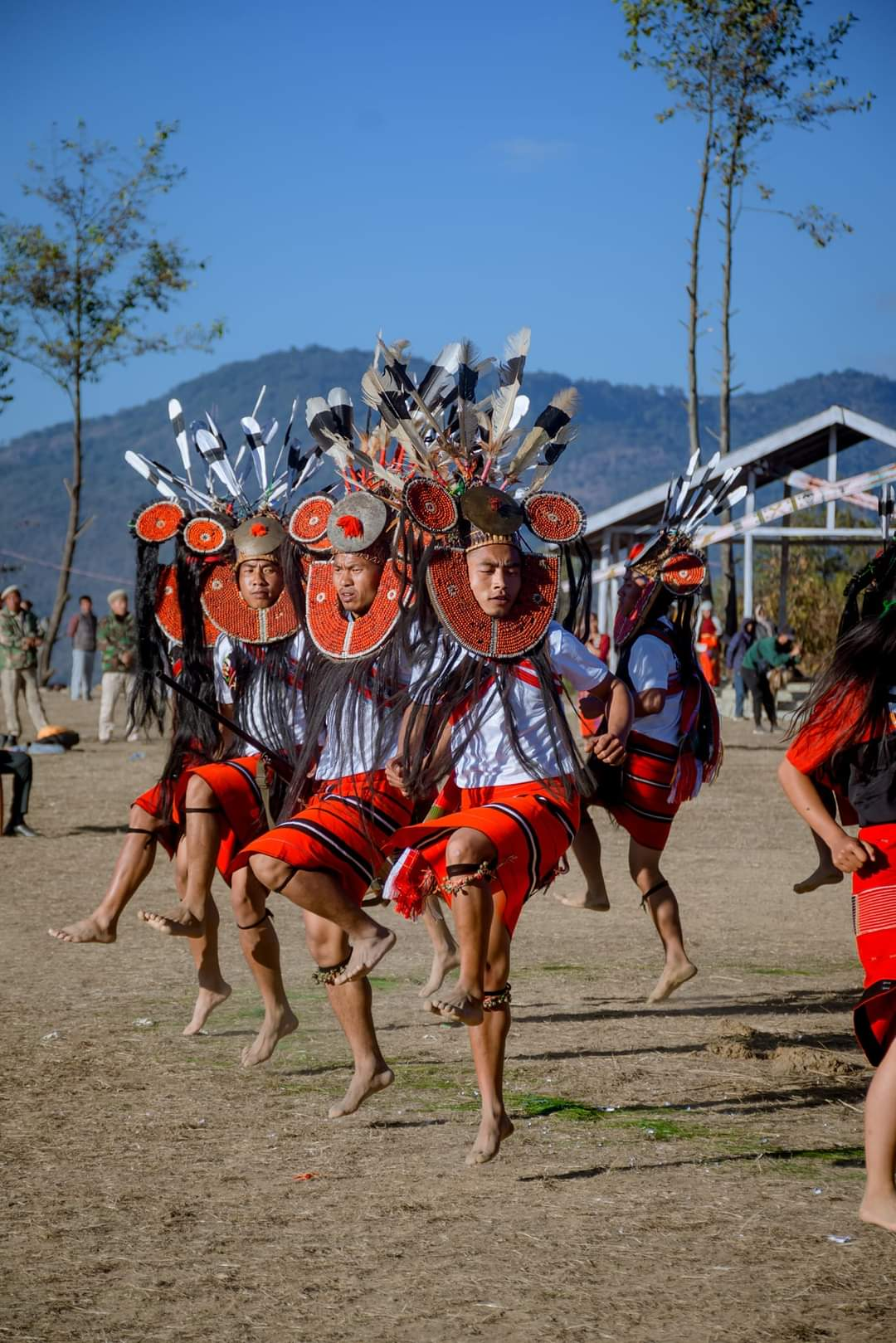
- Tangkhul men performing a folk dance in traditional attire

Total population
- 178,568 (2011 census)

Regions with significant populations

Languages
- Tangkhulic languages, Sorbung, Falam

Religion
- Christianity, Animism

Related ethnic groups
- Tenyimis and other Naga Ethnic Groups, Meitei

The Tangkhuls, also known as the Tangkhul Nagas, are a Naga ethnic group living in Ukhrul District, occupying the Ukhrul district and Kamjong district in the Northeast Indian state of Manipur, and in parts of neighbouring Myanmar. Despite this international border, many Tangkhul have continued to regard themselves as "one nation". The name "Tangkhul" is originated from the Meitei language words, "Tang" meaning "scarce" and "Khul" meaning "village" respectively. According to another theory of origin, the term "Tangkhul" is derived from "Thankhul", meaning "Than village" in Meitei language.

== Relationship with the Meiteis ==
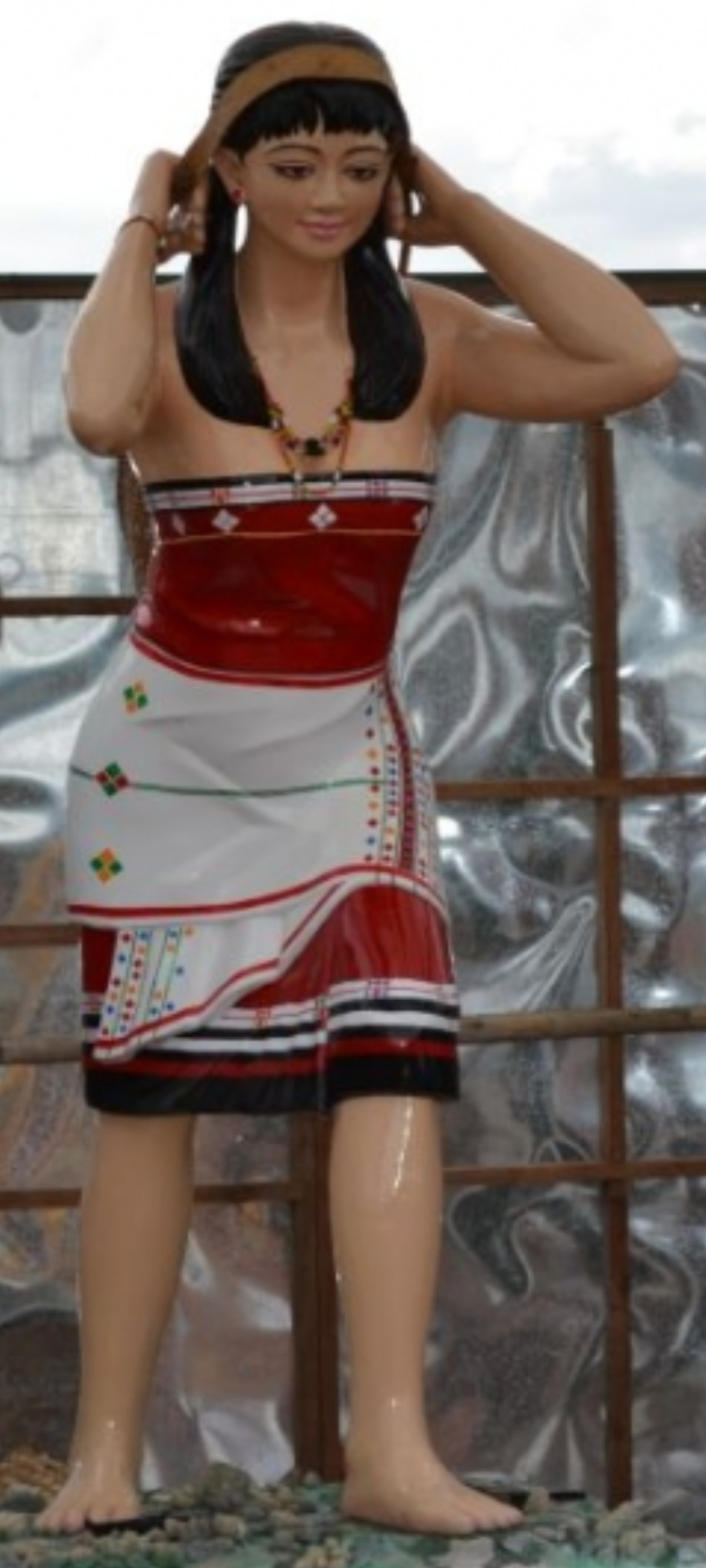
Statue of Haoreima, a Meitei goddess of Tangkhul origin, installed in the Kakching Garden of Kakching district, Manipur

Haoreima, the Meitei goddess of tragic love and separation, was actually a deified person of the Tangkhul origin. She was a daughter of Khelemba, a Tangkhul chief of Chingdai village, and was married to Khamlangba, (Note: He is eponymous with Meitei God Khamlangba, because "Khamlangba" is a popular male given name in Kangleipak (Manipur).) a Tangkhul chief of Chingshong village. Despite marrying Khamlangba, she had a secret love affair with Meitei king Meidingu Tabungba, also called Tabung Saphaba (1359-1394 CE). However, the Meitei king had an untimely death, which shocked Lady Haoreima. Afterwards, she went to the Kanglei Pungmayol (in modern-day Imphal). Later, she also died, following her lover's path and was eventually venerated as the Meitei goddess of tragic love and separation. She is also identified as goddess Ireima, an incarnation of goddess Panthoibi of the Meitei pantheon.

== Tangkhul Naga Long ==
Tangkhul Naga Long, founded in 1929, is the apex body of the Tangkhul Naga community in Manipur. It is made up of chiefs and leaders of different Tangkhul villages. It represents Tangkhul aspirations and puts forward demands to the government on behalf of the Tangkhul people.

In 2022, its president Hopkinson A. Shimray resigned to enter electoral politics. Its current president is Sword Vashum.

== See also ==
- Bible translations into the languages of Northeast India

== Notable people ==
- Rishang Keishing
- Darlando Khathing
- Ralengnao Khathing
- Rewben Mashangva
- Wungngayam Muirang
- Thuingaleng Muivah
- Min Naing
- Hormipam Ruivah
- Hangmila Shaiza
- Yangmaso Shaiza
- Rungsung Suisa
