= Central Tibeto-Burman languages =

Proposed branch of the Sino-Tibetan language family

Central Tibeto-Burman
- Central Trans-Himalayan
- (proposed)
- Geographic distribution: China, Myanmar, India, Bangladesh
- Linguistic classification: Sino-Tibetan: Tibeto-Burman; Central Tibeto-Burman
- Subdivisions: Sal; Kuki-Chin-Naga; Meitei; Meyor; Nungish?

Language codes
- Glottolog: None

Central Tibeto-Burman or Central Trans-Himalayan is a proposed branch of the Sino-Tibetan language family proposed by Scott DeLancey (2015) on the basis of shared morphological evidence.

DeLancey (2018) considers Central Tibeto-Burman to be a linkage rather than a branch with a clearly nested internal structure.

DeLancey's Central Tibeto-Burman group includes many languages in Matisoff's (2015: 1123–1127) proposed Northeast Indian areal group, which includes Tani, Deng (Digaro), “Kuki-Chin–Naga”, Meitei, Mikir, Mru, and Sal.

== Languages ==
DeLancey considers there to be strong morphological evidence for the following Tibeto-Burman branches being part of Central Tibeto-Burman.

- Sal: Jinghpaw, Bodo–Garo
- Lushai-Naga
- Meitei
- Meyor

Jinghpaw and Konyak are likely part of a wider Sal (Brahmaputran) language grouping that also includes the Bodo–Garo and Dhimal branches. DeLancey accepts this grouping and calls it Bodo-Konyak-Jinghpaw (BKJ). DeLancey (2015) notes that Bodo–Garo languages do not have much of the conservative morphology present in Jinghpaw, since Bodo–Garo has undergone extensive creolization during the Kamarupan period.

The Kuki-Chin branch is often considered to be part of a wider Kuki-Chin–Naga grouping that also includes the Ao, Angami–Pochuri, Tangkhulic, and Zemeic branches. DeLancey (2015) suggests that some or all of the "Naga" branches, namely Ao, Angami–Pochuri, Tangkhulic, and Zeme, may also belong to Central Tibeto-Burman.

DeLancey (2015) also considers the possibility of the Nungish branch being part of Central Tibeto-Burman. However, James Matisoff (2013) considers similarities between Jingpho and Nungish to be due to contact. Thus, Nungish is not particularly closely related to Jingpho, and is not a Sal language. On the other hand, Matisoff (2013) notes that Lolo-Burmese, particularly Burmish, appears to be more closely related to Nungish than to Jingpho.

Taking all of these language branches into account results in Central Tibeto-Burman consisting of the Meyor, Sal, and Kuki-Chin–Naga groupings, and possibly Nungish. Question marks (?) signify uncertain or unconfirmed membership of a language group within Central Tibeto-Burman.

Central Tibeto-Burman

- Nungish?
- Meyor–Miju
- Sal (Bodo-Konyak-Jinghpaw)
  - Bodo–Garo
  - Konyak
  - Kachin–Luic
  - Dhimal?
- Kuki-Chin–Naga
  - Kuki-Chin
  - Ao?
  - Angami–Pochuri?
  - Tangkhulic?
  - Zemeic?

== Evidence ==
DeLancey (2015) lists the following morphological features shared by different Central Tibeto-Burman subgroups.

Jinghpaw and Nocte-Tangsa

- Cislocative r- verbal operator
- Perfective glottalization

Jinghpaw and Northwest Kuki-Chin (Monsang-Moyon)

- Change-of-state s- prefix on agreement words
- Plural m- prefix on agreement words
- Copula ni as a verbal operator

Furthermore, Monsang-Moyon (Northwest Kuki-Chin), Nocte-Tangsa, and Meyor all share a k- copula.
