= List of districts of Nagaland =

Districts of Nagaland
- Location: Nagaland
- Number: 17 Districts
- Government: Government of Nagaland

The seventeen districts of Nagaland

The Indian state of Nagaland, has 17 administrative districts: Chümoukedima, Dimapur, Kiphire, Kohima, Longleng, Meluri, Mokokchung, Mon, Niuland, Noklak, Peren, Phek, Shamator, Tuensang, Tseminyü, Wokha and Zünheboto.

There is ongoing demand for several new districts, especially from the relatively inaccessible remote hilly sub-districts of the larger districts farther away from the existing district headquarters.

== Administration ==
=== Commissioner’s Divisions headed by the Divisional commissioner ===
In Nagaland, there is no intermediate administrative tier—such as the Commissioner's Divisions found in Haryana, Uttar Pradesh, or West Bengal—functioning between the Nagaland Legislative Assembly and individual district administrations headed by the District Commissioner. Instead of multiple regional heads, Nagaland utilizes a single State Commissioner who centralizes the supervisory and judicial functions that would typically be split among several Divisional Commissioners in larger states.

==== Civil law authority of the State Commissioner ====
Under the state's unique customary law framework protected by Article 371A of the Constitution of India, the Commissioner serves as the apex appellate and supervisory authority for a hybrid legal system where Naga customary traditions govern civil and criminal justice. This role is distinct because the Commissioner oversees the Dobhashi Courts and Village Councils, ensuring that traditional tribal adjudication for land disputes and social matters is harmonized with the Rules for Administration of Justice and Police in Nagaland, 1937, effectively acting as the final executive-judicial bridge for the entire state.

- Wide-ranging authority of the State Commissioner in civil and customary tribal court cases: The division of jurisdiction between customary courts and the formal judiciary is defined by the nature of the offense and the identity of the parties involved. Customary courts, which include Village Councils and Dobhashi Courts, possess nearly unlimited jurisdiction over civil disputes, particularly those involving land ownership, inheritance, and tribal social practices under the Nagaland Village and Tribal Councils Act, 1978.
- Very limited authority of the State Commissioner only in the petty criminal cases: In criminal matters, however, their authority is strictly limited to "trifle" or petty offenses. Serious and heinous crimes must be reported to the Deputy Commissioner and tried only by formal statutory courts to ensure compliance with the Bharatiya Nyaya Sanhita.

==== Territorial multi-district tribal authorities ====
In Nagaland, territorial and tribal authorities are structured through a hierarchy of customary and statutory bodies that operate from the village level to the regional state level. Traditional governance is legally anchored in the Nagaland Village and Tribal Councils Act, 1978, which recognizes a hierarchy consisting of Village Councils for local administration and justice, Village Development Boards (VDBs) for implementing developmental schemes, and individual Apex Tribal Councils (such as the Naga Hoho or tribal Sendens) that manage customary laws for the state's 17 officially recognized major ethnic groups. These groups include 15 Naga tribes and the 2 non-Naga tribes as follows:

- 15 Naga tribes: These groups include 15 Naga tribes, Angami, Ao, Chakhesang, Chang, Khiamniungan, Konyak, Lotha, Phom, Pochury, Rengma, Sangtam, Sumi, Tikhir, Yimkhiung, and Zeliang (Zeliangrong).
- 2 non- Naga tribes: These groups include 2 non-Naga tribes, Kuki and Kachari tribes.

==== Frontier Nagaland Territorial Authority - territorial multi-district tribal authority for the Eastern Nagaland ====
On 5 February 2026, the Frontier Nagaland Territorial Authority (FNTA) via a tripartite agreement between the Government of India, the Government of Nagaland, and the Eastern Nagaland Peoples' Organisation (ENPO) was created covering 8 tribes and 6 eastern-most districts of Nagaland on India–Myanmar border. The FNTA provides legislative, executive, and financial autonomy over 46 subjects for six eastern-most districts on India–Myanmar border, (listed north to south) Mon, Longleng, Tuensang, Noklak, Shamator, and Kiphire — representing eight tribes including the Konyak, Sangtam, Chang, Khiamniungan, Yimkhiung, Tikhir, Phom, and Sumi.

=== Districts headed by the District Commissioner ===
A district of an Indian state is an administrative geographical unit, headed by a district magistrate or a deputy commissioner, an officer belonging to the Indian Administrative Service. The district magistrate or the deputy commissioner is assisted by a number of officials belonging to different wings of the administrative services of the state.

A superintendent of police, an officer belonging to the Indian Police Service is entrusted with the responsibility of maintaining law and order and related issues at the district level.

== History ==
On 1 December 1957, the Naga Hills District of Assam and Tuensang Frontier Division of the North-East Frontier Agency (now Arunachal Pradesh) were joined to form the centrally governed Naga Hills Tuensang Area. At that point the previous subdivisions became Kohima District, Mokokchung District and Tuensang District. February 1961 saw the renaming of Naga Hills Tuensang Area to "Nagaland", and in December 1963 Nagaland became the 16th state of India.

19 December 1973 saw the new districts of Wokha District and Zünheboto District carved out of Mokokchung District, Mon District carved from Tuensang District, and Phek District created out of Kohima District.

On 2 December 1997, Dimapur District was carved out from Kohima District and was inaugurated in April 1998.

Three more districts were added on 24 October 2003: Kiphire District, Longleng District and Peren District. Kiphire and Longleng Districts were carved out from Tuensang District, Peren District was carved from Kohima District.

Noklak District was created on 20 January 2021, previously having been a sub-district of Tuensang District.

On 18 December 2021, three new districts were created: Chümoukedima District and Niuland District carved from Dimapur District and Tseminyü District carved from Kohima District.

On 19 January 2022, Shamator District carved from Tuensang was created as the 16th district of Nagaland.

In 2024, Meluri sub-division of the Phek district was upgraded to form Meluri district.

== Districts ==
=== List of districts ===
The seventeen districts of Nagaland, and their headquarters, 2011 census populations, areas and elevations (of the seat) are:

Sl No	District	Headquarter	Area (km^{2})	Elevation (m)	Population total	Population rural	Population urban	Date created	Map
1	Chümoukedima District	Chümoukedima	610	171	125,400	81,884	43,516	2021	
2	Dimapur District	Dimapur	70	145	170,000	0	170,000	1997	
3	Kiphire District	Kiphire	1,130	896	74,004	57,517	16,487	2004	
4	Kohima District	Kohima	1,207	1,444	267,988	146,900	121,088	1957	
5	Longleng District	Longleng	885	1,100	50,484	42,871	7,613	2004	
6	Meluri District	Meluri	1,011	n/a	22,558	n/a	n/a	2024	
7	Mokokchung District	Mokokchung	1,719	1,325	194,622	138,897	55,725	1957	
8	Mon District	Mon	1,786	655	250,260	215,816	34,444	1973	
9	Niuland District	Niuland	440	154	11,876	11,876	0	2021	
10	Noklak District	Noklak	1,152		59,300	59,300	0	2017	
11	Peren District	Peren	2,300	1,445	95,219	81,429	13,790	2004	
12	Phek District	Phek	2,026	1,524	163,418	138,843	24,575	1973	
13	Shamator District	Shamator	410	n/a	12,726	n/a	n/a	2022	
14	Tseminyü District	Tseminyü	256	1,261	63,629	60,766	2863	2021	
15	Tuensang District	Tuensang	2,536	1,371	137,296	100,522	36,774	1957	
16	Wokha District	Wokha	1,628	1,313	166,343	131,339	35,004	1973	
17	Zünheboto District	Zünheboto	1,255	1,852	140,757	113,160	27,597	1973	

=== Subdivisions ===
District (DC headquarter)	Sub-districts (ADC headquarters)	Sub-divisions (SDO headquarters)	Circles (EAC headquarters)
Chümoukedima District	Medziphema	Chümoukedima, Dhansiripar	Seithekema
Dimapur District	–	Kuhuboto	–
Kiphire District	Pungro, Seyochung	–	Amahator, Khonsa, Kiusam, Longmatra, Sitimi
Kohima District	Chiephobozou	Jakhama, Sechü Zubza	Botsa, Kezocha
Longleng District	Tamlu	–	Bora Namsang, Sakshi, Yachem, Yongnyah
Mokokchung District	Mangkolemba, Tuli	Changtongya, Tzürangkong	Alongkima, Chuchuyimlang, Kobulong, Longchem, Merangmen, Ongpangkong
Mon District	Aboi, Naginimora, Tizit, Tobu	Angjangyang, Chen, Monyakshu, Phomching, Wakching	Hunta, Longching, Longshen, Mopung, Shangnyu
Niuland District	–	–	Aghunaqa, Nihokhu
Noklak District	–	Thonoknyu	Nokhu, Panso
Peren District	Tening, Jalukie	Athibung	Kebai–Khelma, Ngwalwa, Nsong
Phek District	Chozuba, Meluri, Pfütsero	Chizami	Sakraba, Sekrüzu, Phokungri, Khezhakeno, Chetheba, Khuza, Zuketsa, Phor, Lephory, Razeba
Shamator District	–	Chessore	Mangko, Tsurangto
Tuensang District	Longkhim	Noksen	Chare, Chingmei, Ngoungchung, Sangsangnyu, Sotokur
Tseminyü District	–	–	Tsogin
Wokha District	Bhandari, Sanis	Ralan	Aitepyong, Baghty, Champang, Chukitong, Englan, Lotsü, Süngro, Wozhüro
Zünheboto District	Aghunato, Akuluto, Atoizu, Pughoboto, Satakha	Suruhuto	Akuhaito, Asuto, Ghathashi, Hoshepu, Saptiqa, Satoi, V. K

== Demands for new districts ==
Several sub-districts and local demand committees in Nagaland have proposed the creation of new administrative districts. These demands are primarily driven by the need to bridge significant geographical distances to current district headquarters, improve public service delivery, and address localized administrative requirements.

List of Proposed Districts in Nagaland Grouped by Current District
Proposed District	Expected Area of Jurisdiction	Rationale for Creation
Proposed from Mon
Aboi	Central part of the existing Mon district.	Proposed by the Aboi District Demand Committee (ADDC) based on population size and existing government infrastructure, with renewed demands following the creation of other districts in 2021.
Tobu	Southern part of the existing Mon district, including Tobu and Moka.	Sought by the Tobu District Demand Committee (TDDC) to reduce travel distances to the district headquarters, as some villages are located 190 km away near the Myanmar border.
Proposed from Noklak
Thuonoknyu	Southern part of the existing Noklak district.	Aimed at improving administrative services for the local Khiamniungan and Tikhir populations and addressing developmental requirements in the area.
Proposed from Kiphire
Pungro	Southeastern part of the existing Kiphire district.	Demanded to address the geographic isolation of the border area near Mount Saramati and improve localized administrative reach.
Proposed from Mokokchung
Mangkolemba	Northwestern and western parts of the existing Mokokchung district.	Proposed by the District Demand Committee Mangkolemba (DDCM) to address road connectivity issues and eliminate the 80 km travel distance to Mokokchung town for administrative services.
Proposed from Wokha
Bhandari	Northwestern and western parts of the existing Wokha district.	Demanded to manage inter-state border administration with Assam and to facilitate local economic and agricultural development.
Proposed from Phek
Chozuba	Western part of the existing Phek district.	A longstanding local demand seeking to establish a decentralized administrative unit for the region.
Pfutsero	Southern part of the existing Phek district.	Proposed to decentralize administration and improve governance reach for southern populations.
Proposed from Peren
Tening	Southern part of the existing Peren district.	Sought to establish a more localized administration to manage land-use and developmental challenges in the area.

== See also ==
- List of villages in Nagaland
- Local government in Nagaland
