= List of people of Angami descent =

The following is a list of notable people belonging to Angami Naga people. This list also includes notable individuals from the Chakhesang Naga people (formerly known as the Eastern Angami people).

== Chakhesang ==
=== Chizami ===
- Melhite Kenye (1922–2022), Pastor and Agriculturist
- K. G. Kenye (b. 1960), Politician
- Seno Tsuhah, Social Activist

=== Dzülhami ===
- Chekrovolü Swüro (b. 1982), first Naga female Olympian
- Lhüthiprü Vasa, Member of Nagaland Legislative Assembly from 1964 to 1969 from the Naga Nationalist Organization Party

=== Kami ===
- Neiba Kronu (b. 1967), Politician

=== Phek ===
- Küzholuzo Nienü (b. 1966), Politician

=== Phüsachodu ===
- Chotisüh Sazo (b. 1962), Politician

=== Rünguzu ===
- Mülhüpra Vero (1934–2020), Politician

=== Thipüzu ===
- Zhokhoi Chüzho (b. 1984), Actor

=== Yorüba ===
- Vamuzo Phesao (1938–2000), Politician
- Sano Vamuzo (b. 1940), Social worker

== Chakhro Angami ==
=== Tsiepama ===
- Rokonicha Kuotsü (1946–2019), Politician

== Northern Angami ==
=== Kohima ===
- Neidonuo Angami, Social Worker; Shortlisted for the Nobel Peace Prize in 2000
- Easterine Kire, Writer
- Khrielie-ü Kire (1918–2013), Physician
- Khriehu Liezietsu, Politician from Northern Angami I constituency
- Shürhozelie Liezietsu, Chief Minister of Nagaland (22 February 2017 – 19 July 2017)
- Methaneilie Solo, Composer and Singer

=== Nerhema ===
- Neikezhakuo Kengurüse (1974–1999), Kargil Martyr and Mahavir Chakra Awardee
- Neiliezhü Üsou (1941–2009), Baptist Preacher, Church Musician and Public Figure

=== Tuophema ===
- Hekani J. Kense, Politician from Dimapur III constituency
- Neiphiu Rio, four-time Chief Minister of Nagaland and Member of Parliament of the Lok Sabha.
- Theja Rio, Filmmaker
- Zhaleo Rio, Politician from Ghaspani II constituency

== Southern Angami ==
=== Kigwema ===
- Sesino Yhoshü, Filmmaker
- Vikho-o Yhoshü (1952–2019), Politician

=== Viswema ===
- Viseyie Koso, The first Naga sportsman to represent India at an Asian Games (2010 Asian Games held in Guangzhou, Guangdong, China)
- Vizol Koso, The fourth Chief Minister of Nagaland and also the first Naga pilot (Royal Indian Air Force during World War II)
- Zale Neikha, Member of Nagaland Legislative Assembly from 2018 to 2023 from the Nationalist Democratic Progressive Party
- Viswesül Pusa, Member of Nagaland Legislative Assembly from 1993 to 2013 from the Indian National Congress Party
- Tseilhoutuo Rhütso, Present Member of Nagaland Legislative Assembly from Kohima Town Assembly constituency from the National People's Party
- Vizadel Sakhrie, The first Naga Medical Specialist
- Hovithal Sothu, Project Director at TAFMA
- Zaku Zachariah Tsükrü, Student and Public leader
- Kropol Vitsu, Present Member of Nagaland Legislative Assembly from the Bharatiya Janata Party

== Western Angami ==
=== Jotsoma ===
- Reivilie Angami (1923–1998), Recipient of Burma Star, Brigadier in the Naga National Council
- Thepfülo-u Nakhro (1913–1986), Chief Minister of Nagaland from 1966 to 1969.
- Kiyanilie Peseyie (1941–2017), Politician

=== Khonoma ===
- Kevichüsa Angami (1903–1990), Politician
- John Bosco Jasokie (1927–2005), Chief Minister of Nagaland (1975; 1980–1982).
- Andrea Kevichüsa, Actress and Model
- Chalie Kevichüsa (1943–1992), Journalist
- Razhukhrielie Kevichüsa (1941–2022), Bureaucrat and Musician
- Tubu Kevichüsa (1948–1996), General Secretary of the Naga National Council
- Salhoutuonuo Kruse, The first woman to be elected to the Nagaland Legislative Assembly
- Zapu Phizo (1904–1990), Leader of Naga National Council
- Theyiechüthie Sakhrie, General Secretary of the Naga National Council

== See also ==
- List of Naga people
