= Rüza =

Rüza is an Indigenous rainwater harvesting system practiced by the Angami Naga and Chakhesang Naga tribes in Nagaland.

== Terminology ==
Rüza is also popularly known an Zabo. In the local Chokri language, 'ruza,' means ‘impounding water or run-off water pond or tank for irrigation.’ However, researchers and reports have popularised its smaller system known as Zabo system.

== Practice ==
Kikrüma, a rainshadow village in Phek district, practices Rüza to overcome water scarcity and ensure good agricultural harvest. The village lies at an elevation of 1604.1 msl. It has a temperate highland, tropical climate and witnesses a dry winter. Its annual rainfall is around 461mm.

While the village ancestors lived by the river and cultivated near the riverbank, the population increase mandated shifting smaller hamlets to higher elevations. In addition, the Seidzü river and Khuza rivers, which flow to the south and north of the village respectively, are seasonal rivers and do not meet its water needs. The lack of permanent water source and scanty rainfall led to the development of the Rüza system around a hundred years ago. The village receives only 461.18mm rainfall annually while Nagaland state receives over 2000mm in just 150 days of rainfall.

The practice involves impounding run-off water in ponds, using gravity-based irrigation. These ponds, spreading to about 0.2 hectares, are located at a higher elevation and narrow drains connect them to the farms below. The runoff water is channelised through cattle yards too. This cleans the yards and carries manure to the fields below. The forest lands are the main catchment areas. The village residents cut channels in the forests to facilitate the rainwater to the ponds.

In 2023, there were over 200 harvesting ponds in Kikruma and each is shared by multiple farmers to irrigate the adjoining fields. The system was practiced by over 950 households in the village. 26 hectares of farmland was cultivated under the Ruza system. Poruba, the neighbouring Chakhesang village also now practice Rüza, which they call Zabii. Chozuba and Pfütsero also practice Ruza albeit in smaller scale.

=== Zabo ===
Zabo is a small pit dug within a paddy field, ideally used for rearing fish.

== Farming ==
The Zabo or Rüza system is an integrated form of farming comprising forestry, horticulture, agriculture, fishery and animal husbandry with well-founded soil and water conservation base. The main crop is rice, of which over 15 varieties are cultivated in Rüza-supported farms, both sticky and non-sticky varieties. The yield of paddy is about three to four tonnes per hectare.

Like most Indigenous farming practice in Nagaland, rice is grown along with other fruits and vegetables in the jhum fields. Those in Kikrüma include, mango, guava, banana, papaya, pomegranate, corn, potato, chayote, taro, cucumber, cabbage, garlic, tamarillo, ghost pepper, among others. Pulses and beans are also grown along.

Most farmers practice Rice polyculture, with paddy and fish together. Saplings of the common carp, Asian snakehead and snails, are kept in Zabo, dug amid the paddy fields. Post transplantation, the saplings move to the wet paddy fields for scavenging and to mature. On average 50-60 kilograms of fish are harvested per hectare.

Due to increasing water scarcity, some other villages in Phek district are also adopting Ruza on a smaller scale.

== Indigenous Knowledge ==
Children learn the traditional system by watching and helping their family from a very young age, especially during the farming season. School students are also enrolled to help with rice transplantation during their vacation, usually by the end of May.

== Government support ==
Lack of government and institutional support hinders the practice from being adopted by other villages and hamlets.

== Also see ==
Cheo-ozihi, rainwater harvesting practice at Kigwema.
