= Sakraba =

Coordinates: 25.617°N 94.361°E

Sakraba (also Sükraba) is a village of the Chakhesang tribe located in the Phek district of Nagaland in northeastern India. The village is 12 kilometers away from Pfütsero. The people of Sakraba speak the Chokri language. Ethnically, Sakraba is a Chokri village. It is bounded by the Zanübou range and Pholami village in the north, Gidemi village & Chizami Town in the east, Chizami village in the south and Porba village in the west. The endangered Tragopan bird is found in the Zanübou ranges. Apart from varieties of flora and fauna, medicinal plants like ginseng are also found here.

Sakraba has a total area of 22.5 km^{2} under its occupation. According to the 2006 census, it has a population of 1570, a population density of 69.78 per km^{2} and a literacy rate of 88.17%.

Agriculture is the main occupation of the people of this village. Terrace cultivation is practiced, and jhum cultivated on a small scale. Of late, people have taken an interest in horticulture, which has become one of the main sources of income. Of all horticultural practices, cardamom plantation is the most popular. The village produce high quality cardamom. The village was declared as the Cardamom village in 2015.

Sakraba village has its established customs and social mores. The village is administered by the village leader through collective leadership. In the administration, a set of rules and laws are conventionally followed till today in spite of the availability of written modern rules and acts being prescribed by the state government. There has a customary jail called Rabbit jail to punish anti-social activities.

The village has a zeal to preserve its rich traditional and cultural heritages such as native songs, traditional sports (particularly wrestling) and its festivals. The most important festival of Sakraba is Tükhanye, which is usually celebrated before monsoon. Other festivals include Sükrünye, Tülünye and Khilünye.

During the early 1960s when the Indo-Naga conflict reached its zenith, the common men suffered the most. At the initiative of the NBCC, a peace mission was formed comprising Mr. Jayaprakesh Narayan, Mr. Shankar Deva, Mr. Bimala Prasad Chaliha and Rev. Michael Scott (priest) (Mission South Africa, famous for international peacemaking). This mission led to the first Ceasefire between the Federal Government of Nagaland and the Indian government, which was signed at this village on 24 May 1964. In memory of this historical event, a building was built by the government of Nagaland in 1982 known as "Peace Memorial Building". In honor of this, a private school has been opened called "Peace Centre School" Sakraba.

Article contributed by CUNIEYI LOHE

LOCATION

Country	India
State	Nagaland
District	Phek
Pin	797107
