= Centre Chakhesang =

Indian sub-ethnic group

Coordinates: 25°37′32.29″N 94°11′57.46″E

Regions with significant populations
- Nagaland

The Centre Chakhesangs are a sub-ethnic group of the Chakhesang Naga inhabiting the Northeast Indian state of Nagaland. It comprises seven villages, namely Porba, Sakraba, Gidemi, Pholami, Upper Khomi, Middle Khomi, and Lower Khomi.
