= Khezhakeno =

Khezhakeno Kozabomi
- Village
- Location in Nagaland, India Khezhakeno (India)
- Coordinates: 25°30′51″N 94°12′30″E
- Country: India
- State: Nagaland
- District: Phek District
- Elevation: 1,660 m (5,450 ft)

Population (Census 2011)
  - Total: 3,810

Languages
  - Local: Kozale/ Khezha (Chakhesang)
- PIN: 797107

Khezhakeno is a village in the Phek District of the Indian state of Nagaland. It is a historical village of the Nagas and is located in the region 25.30°N 94.12°E at an elevation of 1660 meters above sea level and shares its border with the state of Manipur in the south. The village is 48 km from the state capital Kohima via NEC Viswema-Kidima-Zuketsa road and is 23 km away from its Sub-divisional headquarter Pfütsero. It falls under the Administrative Circle of Khezhakeno HQ headed by an Extra Assistant Commissioner.

The village is inhabited by Khezha people belonging to a sub-tribe of Chakhesang Naga. Its natives, however, refer to the village and themselves as Kozabomi, meaning ‘the native people of Koza’, which is derived from their chief's name ‘Koza’, who founded the village.

== History ==
Khezhakeno, also mentioned as Kezakenoma or Khezakenoma by some authors, was initially home to many Naga ethnic groups until the dispersal of these groups to different places. According to the history of Naga migration, a particular wave of Naga ethnic groups on crossing Burma (Myanmar), wandered through the valley of Imphal, Manipur, then moved northward and finally settled at the present site of Khezhakeno, Nagaland. This group stayed in and around Khezhakeno for a considerable period of time and finally dispersed to different regions for further settlement. Some Naga ethnic groups that are known to have dispersed from Khezhakeno are Angami, Chakhesang, Lotha, Sümi, Rengma and numerous other clans.

=== The legend of final migration and settlement ===
Traditional folklore as handed down from the ancestors speaks of the migrating group that on reaching a place (now at Shajouba, Manipur where a grand wild pear tree exist), they halted and sought for a divine intervention for their onward journey. As a result, the chief, accordingly thrust his walking stick into the ground for signs. Thereupon, the stick tilted toward the north-east direction and soon swallows began to hover over them before taking off toward the direction to where the stick pointed. The group followed the birds until it stopped and hovered over at a place (Khezhakeno) where a large-flat stone laid. All these signs and experiences convinced them of some divine guidance and sensing the land being highly suitable for wet cultivation and as well as for living, the group eventually settled at the site.

Here, they experienced many supernatural activities especially when before their very eyes they saw a frog with a stalk of paddy on its mouth hopped onto the large-flat stone and left it behind. Later on to their amazement the paddy was found to have increased to twofold. This large-flat stone, also popularly known as Tso Tawo or "the Spirit Stone", continued to play an important role in the livelihood of the early settlers as it was believed to have doubled the rice paddies at the end of the day when laid on it for drying in the sun. Although, its charm is said to have gone as it was burned and destroyed due to a disagreement that arose as to who should take turn to dry paddy, the remnants of this legendary Khezhakeno stone is still preserved in its original location even today.

=== The expansion of the village ===
Since the settlement, the village grew and became more populated which resulted in the emergence of six more villages around Khezhakeno (Kozabomi), namely; (1) Tephfulo, (2) Mobvolo (Movolomi), (3) Chichülomi, (4) Phfulo (Pfulomi), (5) Latsholo and (6) Chilhuomi (Chilomi). In due course of time, some of the villages got relocated to other region while some part conglomerated back to the original parent village.

== Demography ==
As per the Population Census of India 2011, the village with a total of 606 household has a population of 3281 persons of which 1643 are males and 1638 are females. The average Sex Ratio is 997 which is higher than Nagaland state average of 931 and the Child Sex Ratio is 980.

The literacy rate of the village is 76.30%, where Male literacy is at 84.77% and female literacy rate at 67.83%.

== Tourism ==
The village today has become a favourable destination for local tourists for its historical significance and as well as for its natural beauty such as the Loho Lake. The Village, with the initiative from the Government of Nagaland, has a tourist bungalow and under the Ministry of Culture, a Tribal Museum at Chida where the rich cultural and traditional artefacts of Chakhesang and the Nagas in general have been showcased.

== See also ==
- List of villages in Nagaland
