= Dzülhami =

- Village
- Location of Dzülhami
- Coordinates: 25.825649°N 94.393803°E
- Country: India
- Region: Northeast India
- State: Nagaland
- District: Phek District

Population (2011)
  - Total: 2,823
  - Dialect: Chokri
- Time zone: UTC+5:30 (IST)
- PIN: 797104
- Vehicle registration: NL-08
- Sex ratio: 973 ♂/♀
- Website: nagaland.nic.in

Dzülhami or simply Dzülha is a Chakhesang Naga village in the Phek District of the Indian state of Nagaland. It is located 87 km (54 mi) northeast of Kohima, the capital of Nagaland.

== Demographics ==
Dzülhami is situated in the Sekrüzu Circle of Phek District in Nagaland. As per the population Census 2011, there are total 707 families residing in Dzülhami. The total population of Dzülhami is 2,823.

== Notable people ==
- Chekrovolü Swüro, Sportsperson and 2013 Arjuna Award Winner
- Lhüthiprü Vasa (died. 1993), Politician and Member of the Nagaland Legislative Assembly

== See also ==
- List of villages in Nagaland
