= 2017 Nagaland Olympic Games =

1st Nagaland Olympic Games
- Host city: Dimapur; Chümoukedima
- Country: India
- Opening: 13 December 2017
- Closing: 19 December 2017
- Opened by: Padmanabha Acharya (Governor of Nagaland)
- Closed by: T. R. Zeliang (Chief Minister of Nagaland)
- Main venue: DDSC Stadium

The 1st Nagaland Olympic Games was a multi-sport event held from 13 to 19 December 2017 in Dimapur. The participating delegations included 11 delegations from all districts under Nagaland. A total of 1,380 athletes from the 11 Districts of Nagaland competed in 12 sports and disciplines.

Kohima led the final medal tally, followed by Dimapur in second place, and Phek in third place. The Games was co-hosted by Chümoukedima.

== Sports ==
There were a total of 12 sports at the 1st Nagaland Olympic & Paralympic Games.

- Archery
- Athletics
- Badminton
- Boxing
- Football
- Lawn tennis
- Sepak takraw
- Taekwondo
- Table tennis
- Volleyball
- Wrestling
- Wushu

== Medal table ==
Rank	Delegation	Gold	Silver	Bronze	Total
1	Kohima	23	22	34	79
2	Dimapur	23	16	12	51
3	Phek	19	14	18	51
4	Tuensang	13	5	8	26
5	Mokokchung	12	15	12	39
6	Longleng	4	6	7	17
7	Wokha	2	7	5	14
8	Peren	2	6	6	14
9	Zünheboto	1	4	1	6
10	Mon	1	2	4	7
11	Kiphire	0	1	4	5
Totals (11 entries)		100	98	111	309
