= Khomi =

Ethnic group in India

Khomi are a people found in Centre Chakhesang village in the Phek district of Nagaland, India.
