= Seno Tsuhah =

Seno Tsuhah is a primary school teacher and Indigenous social activist from the Chakhesang Naga community in Chizami, Nagaland. She is recognised in Northeast India for her work on gender justice and sustainable farming; she has been associated with the feminist organisation, North East Network (NEN), for over twenty years.

== Early life ==
Seno Tsuhah is part of the Chakhesang Naga community in Chizami, Nagaland. As part of Chizami Students' Union, she became involved in community activities. After her college studies, she returned to her native village, teaching at the primary school in a neighbouring village and joining the Chizami Women's Society (CWS). She met Monisha Behal in Pfütsero at one of the training programmes of the North East Network (NEN) in 1996 and officially joined NEN two years later. She worked as an activist for women's rights. After eight years of her efforts, Tsuhah managed to convince Chizami village council that women deserved equal wages in unskilled labour. In 2014, the council passed a resolution decreeing equal wages for women agricultural labourers on par with men. The following year, two women were selected to become members of the council. In the highly patriarchal Naga society, the Chizami village council continues to be one of very few that have women as active members.

== Indigenous farming ==
Tsuhah is an Indigenous food sovereignty activist. She set up an NEN centre in Chizami which collected fifteen varieties of millet. Tsuhah represented the Chakhesang Naga community at the 2009 United Nations Climate Change Conference in Copenhagen, Denmark. Tsuhah has asserted the role of indigenous women in local farming practices as well as preserving biodiversity. On the occasion of International Women's Day in 2017, she said "Let us acknowledge their [women's] work by using this platform to relook, rethink and restrategise to recognise the contributions of women and men farmers practicing ecological agriculture in our communities". Tsuhah also focuses on role of women in crop selection and seed preservation.

== Awards ==
In September 2020, Tsuhah received the 13th Peace Channel Award in Dimapur for her contributions towards women rights, good governance, natural resource management, and sustainable livelihood. In her acceptance speech, Tsuhah acknowledged the women with whom she has travelled throughout the years, especially women farmers, artisans, vendors, elders, and custodian knowledge holders. Two years later, the Naturenomics award was conferred by the Balipara Foundation in recognition of her pioneering work with Chizami Weaves. In her acceptance, she dedicated the award to the weavers who "become more active and participate in community works in their own village and through this work it has 'visible-lised' the contribution of women." She stated that the award acknowledges the work on sustainable livelihood through textile weaving.
