= Kuzhami language =

Sino-Tibetan language of Nagaland, India

Kuzhami
- Native to: India
- Region: Nagaland
- Ethnicity: Chakhesang Naga
- Native speakers: 41,625 (2011 census)
- Language family: Sino-Tibetan: Angami–Pochuri; Kuzhami

Language codes
- ISO 639-3: nkh
- Glottolog: khez1235
- ELP: Khezha Naga

Kuzha, or Khezha, is a major language of the Chakhesang Naga ethnic group of Phek District in the southern part of Nagaland, India. It is generally spoken by the Kuzhami people and is one of the three major languages of the Chakhesang Nagas. Khezha or Kuzhale is predominantly spoken in Pfütsero and Chizami region of Phek District. It is also spoken by few villages in the northern part of Ukhrul District in the state of Manipur. It also shares a high lexical similarity with the Mao Language and Poumai Language. This intelligibility has been however, reduced due to Chokri and Pochuric influences.
