= Phek Assembly constituency =

Legislative Assembly constituency in Nagaland State, India

Coordinates: 25.7°N 94.46°E

Phek
- Constituency No. 19 for the Nagaland Legislative Assembly

Constituency details
- Country: India
- Region: Northeast India
- State: Nagaland
- District: Phek
- Lok Sabha constituency: Nagaland
- Established: 1964
- Total electors: 22,122
- Reservation: ST

Member of Legislative Assembly
- 14th Nagaland Legislative Assembly
- Incumbent Küzholüzo Nienü
- Party: NPF
- Alliance: NDA
- Elected year: 2023

Phek is one of the 60 Legislative Assembly constituencies of Nagaland state in India.

It is part of Phek district and is reserved for candidates belonging to the Scheduled Tribes.

== Members of the Legislative Assembly ==
Year	Member	Party
1964	Lhüthiprü Vasa	Independent politician
1969	Yevehü Lohe	Independent politician
1974	Mülhüpra Vero	Nagaland Nationalist Organisation
1977	Vejoyi	United Democratic Alliance
1982	Vejoyi	Naga National Democratic Party
1987	Vejoyi	Naga National Democratic Party
1989	Zachilhü Vadeo	Indian National Congress
1993	Zachilhü Vadeo	Indian National Congress
1998	Zachilhü Vadeo	Indian National Congress
2003	Küzholuzo Nienü	Naga People's Front
2008	Küzholuzo Nienü	Naga People's Front
2013	Küzholuzo Nienü	Naga People's Front
2018	Küzholuzo Nienü	Naga People's Front
2023	Küzholuzo Nienü	Naga People's Front

== Election results ==
=== 2023 Assembly election ===
2023 Nagaland Legislative Assembly election: Phek
Party	Candidate	Votes	%	±%
NPF	Küzholuzo Nienü	9,489	48.92%	−13.48%
NDPP	Küpota Khesoh	9,441	48.67%	13.92%
INC	Zacilhu Ringa Vadeo	427	2.20%	0.37%
NOTA	Nota	39	0.20%	
Margin of victory		48	0.25%	−27.41%
Turnout		19,396	87.68%	3.05%
Registered electors		22,122		5.00%
NPF hold		Swing	-13.48%	

=== 2018 Assembly election ===
2018 Nagaland Legislative Assembly election: Phek
Party	Candidate	Votes	%	±%
NPF	Küzholuzo Nienü	11,127	62.41%	5.86%
NDPP	Küpota Khesoh	6,196	34.75%	
INC	Shezota Lohe	326	1.83%	−4.14%
NOTA	None of the Above	181	1.02%	
Margin of victory		4,931	27.66%	8.45%
Turnout		17,830	84.63%	−6.19%
Registered electors		21,068		−5.48%
NPF hold		Swing	5.86%	

=== 2013 Assembly election ===
2013 Nagaland Legislative Assembly election: Phek
Party	Candidate	Votes	%	±%
NPF	Küzholuzo Nienü	11,447	56.55%	0.20%
Independent	Vekho Swüro	7,559	37.34%	
INC	Küvezochi Hoshi	1,208	5.97%	−15.39%
Margin of victory		3,888	19.21%	−13.18%
Turnout		20,243	90.82%	12.67%
Registered electors		22,289		−10.11%
NPF hold		Swing	0.20%	

=== 2008 Assembly election ===
2008 Nagaland Legislative Assembly election: Phek
Party	Candidate	Votes	%	±%
NPF	Küzholuzo Nienü	10,919	56.35%	−2.77%
RJD	Dezoto Rhakho	4,643	23.96%	
INC	Küvezochi	4,138	21.35%	−19.53%
Margin of victory		6,276	32.39%	14.15%
Turnout		19,378	79.45%	−15.72%
Registered electors		24,795		51.40%
NPF hold		Swing	-2.77%	

=== 2003 Assembly election ===
2003 Nagaland Legislative Assembly election: Phek
Party	Candidate	Votes	%	±%
NPF	Küzholuzo Nienü	9,084	59.12%	
INC	Zachilhü Vadeo	6,282	40.88%	
Margin of victory		2,802	18.24%	
Turnout		15,366	93.87%	5.65%
Registered electors		16,377		11.30%
NPF gain from INC		Swing	6.59%	

=== 1998 Assembly election ===
1998 Nagaland Legislative Assembly election: Phek
Party	Candidate	Votes	%	±%
INC	Zachilhü Vadeo	Unopposed		
Registered electors		14,714		15.96%
INC hold		Swing		

=== 1993 Assembly election ===
1993 Nagaland Legislative Assembly election: Phek
Party	Candidate	Votes	%	±%
INC	Zachilhü Vadeo	5,836	52.53%	−2.90%
NPF	Küzholuzo Nienü	5,274	47.47%	2.90%
Margin of victory		562	5.06%	−5.79%
Turnout		11,110	88.22%	2.75%
Registered electors		12,689		43.93%
INC hold		Swing	-2.90%	

=== 1989 Assembly election ===
1989 Nagaland Legislative Assembly election: Phek
Party	Candidate	Votes	%	±%
INC	Zachilhü Vadeo	4,128	55.42%	8.33%
NPF	Vejoyi	3,320	44.58%	
Margin of victory		808	10.85%	8.41%
Turnout		7,448	85.47%	−0.43%
Registered electors		8,816		−0.08%
INC gain from NND		Swing	5.89%	

=== 1987 Assembly election ===
1987 Nagaland Legislative Assembly election: Phek
Party	Candidate	Votes	%	±%
NND	Vejoyi	3,653	49.54%	13.61%
INC	Zachilhü Vadeo	3,473	47.10%	20.64%
NPP	Nevozo	248	3.36%	
Margin of victory		180	2.44%	−1.62%
Turnout		7,374	85.90%	11.00%
Registered electors		8,823		−6.68%
NND hold		Swing	13.61%	

=== 1982 Assembly election ===
1982 Nagaland Legislative Assembly election: Phek
Party	Candidate	Votes	%	±%
NND	Vejoyi	2,485	35.93%	
Independent	Zachilhü Vadeo	2,204	31.86%	
INC	Küzhohusa	1,830	26.46%	
Independent	K. K. Chiso	398	5.75%	
Margin of victory		281	4.06%	−13.54%
Turnout		6,917	74.90%	−10.97%
Registered electors		9,455		49.75%
NND gain from UDA		Swing	-12.83%	

=== 1977 Assembly election ===
1977 Nagaland Legislative Assembly election: Phek
Party	Candidate	Votes	%	±%
UDA	Vejoyi	2,584	48.75%	12.49%
Independent	Zalhüzü Vasa	1,651	31.15%	
NCN	T. Vesatso	639	12.06%	
Independent	Phukhuve	426	8.04%	
Margin of victory		933	17.60%	11.67%
Turnout		5,300	85.87%	5.36%
Registered electors		6,314		−11.05%
UDA gain from NNO		Swing	6.56%	

=== 1974 Assembly election ===
1974 Nagaland Legislative Assembly election: Phek
Party	Candidate	Votes	%	±%
NNO	Mülhüpra Vero	2,339	42.20%	29.46%
UDA	Zalhüzü Vasa	2,010	36.26%	
Independent	K. K. Chiso	1,194	21.54%	
Margin of victory		329	5.94%	5.69%
Turnout		5,543	80.52%	0.32%
Registered electors		7,098		38.88%
NNO gain from Independent		Swing	19.93%	

=== 1969 Assembly election ===
1969 Nagaland Legislative Assembly election: Phek
Party	Candidate	Votes	%	±%
Independent	Yevehu Lohe	911	22.27%	
Independent	Lhüthiprü Vasa	901	22.02%	
Independent	Zachitso Chizo	890	21.76%	
NNO	Zachire	521	12.74%	
Independent	Vekhuhu Thevuo	476	11.64%	
UDF	Tazuhu	392	9.58%	
Margin of victory		10	0.24%	
Turnout		4,091	80.20%	80.20%
Registered electors		5,111		48.40%
Independent hold		Swing		

=== 1964 Assembly election ===
1964 Nagaland Legislative Assembly election: Phek
Party	Candidate	Votes	%	±%
Independent	Lhüthiprü Vasa	Unopposed		
Registered electors		3,444		
Independent win (new seat)				

== See also ==
- List of constituencies of the Nagaland Legislative Assembly
- Phek district
