= Melhite Kenye =

Indian pastor and Guinness World Record holder

- Born: 6 January 1922; Chizami, Naga Hills District, Assam Province, British India (Now in Phek District, Nagaland)
- Died: 22 February 2022 (aged 100); Chümoukedima, Nagaland, India
- Other name: Paddy Man
- Occupations: Pastor; agriculturist
- Known for: Discovering the world's tallest paddy plant
- Notable work: Melhite Kenye Lha (rice variety)
- Spouse: Kewetso-u Lasuh
- Awards: Governor's Gold Medal (2002)

Melhite Kenye (6 January 1922 – 22 February 2022) was an Indian Baptist pastor and agriculturist from Nagaland. He was recognized by Guinness World Records for discovering the world's tallest recorded paddy plant at Chümoukedima in 1998. The rice plant measured approximately 2.55 metres (8.5 feet).

== Early life ==
Melhite Kenye was born in 1922 in Chizami village under present-day Phek District of Nagaland. He was among the early Christian converts from his village and later moved to Dimapur in 1968.

== Career ==
Kenye served as pastor of the Dimapur Chakhesang Baptist Church and later the Town Baptist Church, Chümoukedima, for nearly four decades.

== Discovery of tallest paddy plant ==
On 1 October 1998, Kenye discovered an unusually tall rice plant in the Chümoukedima area of Nagaland. The plant measured about 2.55 metres (8½ feet), with 175 stalks and 510 grains per ear. The variety was later named Melhite Kenye Lha. On 12 December 2001, Guinness World Records officially recognized it as the tallest paddy plant recorded.

== Recognition ==
For his discovery, Kenye received the Governor's gold medal in 2002 from the Government of Nagaland.

== Death ==
Kenye died on 22 February 2022 in Chümoukedima at the age of 100.
