= Pholami =

Village in India

Pholami is a village in India with a resident population of around 3,000. The village lies on the foothills of Zanübu Range, surrounded by Rünguzu and Thüvopisü in the North, Khomi in the East, Chizami, Sumi and Gidemi in the South, K.Bawe and K.Basa in the Northwest, and Sakraba in the West. It is located in the heart of Chakhesang Naga occupied land in Phek District of Nagaland, India. It lies at an altitude of about 1,500–1,700 metres above the sea level.

== History ==
This village was founded by Kücho-o Getsa and Tachühnu Medeo who had emigrated from(Kalumi) and Phüsachodümi villages respectively. Presently, the village has been organised into three clans-Sühnu, Getsa and Tünyenu, formed by different sub-clans whose ancestors had also migrated to the newly founded village. Pholami derives its name from the word "Phola" which literally means an "abundance" or "overflow" of food grains and crops.

== Administration ==
The village is administered by the village leader headed by VCC(Village Council Chairman).

== Demographics ==
Agriculture is the main occupation of the people living here. According to 2023 Nagaland General Assembly Election, the village has total of 1,176 electoral votors.

== Language ==
The people here speak Chokri Language (a local language in Nagaland).

== Education ==
There are four government recognized schools in the village, out of which one is run by the local church Pholami Baptist Church and the other three are run by the Nagaland Government. Of the three Government schools, two are primary schools (up to class 6) and one is high school.
