= Nana: A Tale of Us =

2017 Nagamese film directed by Tiakümzük Aier

- Film poster
- Directed by: Tiakümzük Aier
- Written by: Limatula Longkümer
- Produced by: Aoyimti Youth Ministry
- Starring: Zhokhoi Chüzho; Mengu Süokhrie; Watipongla Kichü; Ariensa Longchar; Bokavi Swü
- Cinematography: MT Akum Aier
- Edited by: MT Akum Aier
- Music by: Akok Imsong; Atsa Lang Roths; Along Longchar
- Production companies: Dreamz Unlimited - Nagaland; Rain Drops Entertainment
- Release date: 18 July 2017
- Running time: 100 minutes
- Country: India
- Language: Nagamese
- Budget: ₹ 2.5 million (25 lakhs)

Nana: A Tale of Us is a 2017 Indian Nagamese drama film directed by Tiakümzük Aier and produced by Aoyimti Youth Ministry. The film stars Zhokhoi Chüzho, Mengu Süokhrie, Watipongla Kichü, Ariensa Longchar and Bokavi Swü.

With a production budget of ₹2.5 million or 25 lakhs, it was the most expensive Naga film to be produced at the time of its release. Upon its release on 18 July 2017, Nana: A Tale of Us achieved critical and commercial success in the state.

== Premise ==
Nana: A Tale of Us tells of community, love and forgiveness through the story of a family living in rural Nagaland. The film begins at the juncture of the impending State elections and quietly leads us through events that affect its characters to make certain life decisions.

== Cast ==
=== Main ===
- Zhokhoi Chüzho as Malay, Nana's father
- Mengu Süokhrie as Ano, Nana's mother
- Watipongla Kichü as Nana

=== Supporting ===
- Imkong Longchar as Ato, Nana's maternal Uncle
- Ariensa Longchar as Thiru
- Bokavi Swü as Dr. Ramok
- Imnasenla Aier as Miss Grace, Ato's love interest
- Chubatemjen as Mr. Thensa, Miss Grace's father
- Alfrit Chishi as Mad Man

== Production ==
=== Filming ===
The film took 11 months to complete. It took 15 days to shoot. The whole crew stayed at Impur Mission Centre and the major portion was shot at Süngratsü village. The rest was shot at Mopungchuket village and Mokokchung.

== Soundtrack ==
The background score is composed by Akok Imsong, Atsa Lang Roths and Along Longchar.

The song titled ‘Something New’ performed by Jonathan Yhome is the theme song of the film.

== Release ==
The trailer of the film was released on 9 April 2017 and the film was released on 18 July 2017. In February 2021, Aoyimti Youth Ministry released the film on the YouTube platform.

== Reception ==
=== Critical response ===
Film Critic Dr. Piyush said that the film is one of the Finest Films to come out of India this year.

== Awards and nominations ==
Year	Award	Category	Recipient	Result
2017	Edinburgh Festival of Indian Films and Documentaries	Golden Calton Best Director	Tiakümzük Aier	Won
2021	2021 Prag Cine Awards	Best Film North East	Nana: A Tale of Us	Won
2021	2021 Prag Cine Awards	Best Director North East	Tiakümzük Aier	Nominated
2021	2021 Prag Cine Awards	Best Actress North East	Mengu Süokhrie	Nominated
2021	2021 Prag Cine Awards	Best Actor North East	Zhokhoi Chüzho	Nominated
