= Gidemi =

- Location of Gidemi in Nagaland Gidemi (India)
- Coordinates: 25.621°N 94.387°E
- Country: India
- State: Nagaland
- District: Phek

Population (2011)
  - Total: 246

Languages
  - Official: English
- Time zone: UTC+5:30 (IST)
- Telephone code: 91 (0)370
- Vehicle registration: NL-

Gidemi is a village in Phek district, Nagaland. India
