= Mülhüpra Vero =

Indian politician (1934–2020)

Padma Shri Mülhüpra Vero
- Born: 1934; Rünguzu Village, Phek District, Nagaland
- Died: 24 January 2020 (aged 86); Walford, Dimapur, Nagaland
- Resting place: Rünguzu Junction
- Education: St. Edmund's College, Shillong (B.A.)
- Occupations: Politician, Social worker
- Spouse: Kerele Vero
- Children: 2
- Awards: Padma Shri

Mülhüpra Vero (1934–2020) was an Indian politician and the first Member of Parliament in India from among the Naga people. He was also the recipient of the Padma Shri, India's fourth highest civilian award, in 2006 for his contribution to the social work.

== Early life ==
In 1934, Mülhüpra was born in Rünguzu village in present-day Phek District.

He began his studies at the Middle School in Chozuba, and completed his matriculation at Government High School Kohima in 1956. He completed his BA at St. Edmund's College, Shillong in 1959.

== Political life ==
Vero was elected a member of the Rajya Sabha for two terms.

When the Official Languages (Amendment) Bill was tabled in the Rajya Sabha in December 1967, Vero demanded that English be continued for an indefinite period both at the centre and in states as Nagaland had already adopted English as its official language.

He was elected to the Nagaland Legislative Assembly twice: first from Phek (1974) on a Naga National Organisation ticket, and later from Chozuba (1979).

Vero was elected as the first President of the newly instituted Naga Hoho in 1997. At its first session, he said,

I know I am not a good man. But if the Nagas think I am good, I am very happy. And as I also know I am not a clever and able man in any field, I must tell you I will not be able to do anything good for the Nagas. But I promise I will not do anything bad for our people. I ask you and God to help me. Thank you.

As the president, he attended the Atlanta Peace conference. As part of the Naga Hoho, he facilitated the ceasefire between the Naga underground groups and the Government of India. He retained the position until 2004.

On 1 October 2015, the Government of Nagaland honoured him during the International Day of Older Persons celebrations.

== Death ==
Vero died on 24 January 2020 after a brief illness at his residence in Dimapur. He is survived by his wife, Kerele Vero, a son, a daughter, nine grandchildren, and a great-grandson.

Then Nagaland Governor, R. N. Ravi said, "the state has lost a dedicated and sincere public leader." Chingwang Konyak regarding Vero as a very good friend reminisced,

[we] both had been closely associated since the days of NNO in late 1960s and later in [Indian National] Congress party... I have numerous fond memories of us together as young men in our mid 30s – full of josh and enthusiasm to serve the people. I found him to be a jovial and kind-hearted person ready to sacrifice his personal comforts for the cause of the society.

The Naga Mothers' Association also conveyed their condolences with the words, "He was a man who had deep concern for the younger generation and understood and encouraged women leaders to create space within the Naga society."

The National Socialist Council of Nagaland (I-M) also conveyed their shock and bereavement at Vero's death. In their statement, they noted that Vero "left no stone unturned to show his love and concern for the Naga issue" and he appealed to "all the Naga national political groups to reconcile through the spirit of forgive and forget."

The 13th Nagaland Legislative Assembly began its fifth session with obituary references to Vero and Z. Obed.

In his eulogy, Niketu Iralu wrote,

The restoration of unity of the Naga family was Vero’s deepest longing. The trust and goodwill for one another his leadership started to generate made all Nagas believe afresh in the vision “Nagas are One”. He fought for it with conviction and a sense of urgency... Vivid memories of Vero’s shrewdness, humility, unfailing sense of humour and genuine goodwill for all stand out, as I try to reflect on what he gave to his people as a public leader. We have no doubt what he did and gave lives on in our search and unyielding struggle to become what we must become despite our shortcomings and failures.
