= Zhokhoi Chüzho =

Indian actor

- Born: Zhokhoi Chüzho; 1984 (age 41–42); Dimapur, Nagaland, India
- Occupations: Actor; social worker
- Years active: 2006–present

Zhokhoi Chüzho is an Indian actor from Nagaland. He is well known in Nagaland for starring in the 2017 film Nana: A Tale of Us which was a critical and commercial success in the state. His other roles are in the films Little boy (2019), Enter My World (2020) and Nani Teri Morni (2020).

Chüzho has served as the President of Rising Youth under the Rising People's Party (RPP) since April 2022.

== Life and career ==
Zhokhoi Chüzho was born in 1984 in Dimapur, Nagaland to a Chakhesang Naga family. He started his acting career with Nagamese, and has also worked in Doordarshan. After going through multiple auditions Chüzho got a chance in Bollywood.

== Selected filmography ==
Film
Year	Title	Role	Ref.
2016	Force 2		
2017	Nana: A Tale of Us	Malay	
2018	Happy Phirr Bhag Jayegi	Chinese professor	
2019	Little Boy	Jockey	
2019	Saaho	Octopus Gang Leader	
2020	Enter my world	Arep	
2020	Nani Teri Morni	Ranphan	
