= Nagaland State Transport =

Indian public transport corporation

- Type: State-owned
- Industry: Transport
- Founded: 1964
- Headquarters: General Manager's Office, Dimapur
- Area served: Nagaland; Northeast India
- Services: Bus service; Freight service; Rail service; Emergency relief service; Inland Water Transport
- Owner: Government of Nagaland
- Website: nst.nagaland.gov.in

Nagaland State Transport (or NST) (Note: also known as Nagaland State Transport Department; NGST) is a state-run transport department in the Indian state of Nagaland which manages the bus, helicopter, rail, and water transport in the state. Founded as the Nagaland State Transport (NST) in 1964, the NST was formally inaugurated as a government department on 8 November 1966. At the time of its rollout, NST was planned to be completed in five phases with the phase I covering routes such as Dimapur-Kohima-Mao, Amguri-Mokokchung etc and later phases to cover all of Nagaland. NST originally in 1964 started out with eight trucks, one bus and two buses. There are over 1050 employees at present working for the department. The department fleet capacity at present consists of 171 vehicles among which there are five new buses (inducted in 2024), two recovery vans, one dumper truck, one winger, and one mobile van.

On 18 September 2018, NST introduced city pink buses on a trial basis in Dimapur and Kohima. For the trials, 14 buses were obtained from Jawaharlal Nehru National Urban Renewal Mission out of which five were refurbished and renewed to make it operational. A month later, free bus travel was made available by NST for senior citizens aged 60 or above.

A report in May 2023 expressed concerns with the NSTs buses being stranded during Manipur conflict, which were carrying out rescue operation "Operation Kohima Calling" in the state. With most of the buses at the time being "over-aged", NSTs fleet strength was 177. At the time, out of the 213 routes and 519 scheduled services in Nagaland, only 123 routes and 220 scheduled services were operated by NST respectively.

In 2024, NST introduced free travel access to Persons With Disabilities (PwD) which covers journey from source to destination and vice-versa. A free travel pass was also provisioned for the PwD at Rs 50, and which is renewable after two years by paying Rs 20. Also in the same year between 25 to 30 October, a joint hydrographic survey was conducted by the Guwahati branch of Inland Waterways Authority of India and NST to assess the National Waterway-101 (NW-101) corridor in Northeast India.

Next year on 18 October 2025, the NST initiated the Regional Connectivity Scheme (UDAN-RCS) in the state. The project was also assisted by Pawan Hans.

On 5 May 2026, the NST signed a Memorandum of understanding (MoU) with Tata Motors according to which the former's fleet capacity will be expanded by 43 new buses. The deal signed was offered to the department at a cost of Rs ₹130,000,000 which is to be paid by yearly installments in a three-year period. The deal was signed in Kohima between the Additional Chief Engineer from NST, an officer from Nagaland's finance department, Deputy General Manager of Tata Motors, and the state's chief secretary. To ensure that the buses procured are friendly for PwD, the ex-commissioner for Nagaland's PwD urged the state's chief minister, Neiphiu Rio, to do so.

Two months later in July 2026 in areas within the state heavily affected by monsoon, the NST provided a helicopter to help with the relief efforts of Nagaland State Disaster Management Authority (NSDMA) and District Disaster Management Authorities (DDMA). Also in the same month, corruption allegations against NST were brought to light in which the recruited candidates reportedly were charged Rs 10,000 for "paperwork".

To ensure road safety of all passengers and drivers, a speed limit of 30 km/h (19 miles per hour) for buses driving on hills and 60 km/h (37 miles per hour) for plains is made necessary by the NST. Breathalyzer is issued to all stations and sub-stations of the department to monitor the risk of drunk driving. A life insurance is also covered by the NST in case of road accidents.

Intelligent transportation system was recently introduced by the NST which include GPS Vehicle tracking system to monitor bus transport, Passenger Information System, Digital display at all operating stations, and handheld ticket machines.

The Civil Works of Motor Vehicles Department (MVD), Nagaland, are managed by an Assistant Engineer from the Engineering Wing of NST.

Nagaland State Transport services between 2010 to 2014
Items	2010-11	2011-12	2012-13	2013-14
Length of routes covered by NST	12,677	12,700	12,455	12,455
Average number of daily commuters	4807	4887	4807	4912
Average quantity of daily luggage handled	13.50	13.85	11.01	12.15
Number of employees	1050	1050	1050	1050
Number of vehicles	227	249	223	212
Revenue earned (Rs in lakhs)	1155	1302	1137	1226
Gross capital investment (Rs in lakhs)	1155.45	662.65	625	65
