= Kapamüdzü =

Geographic feature in Nagaland

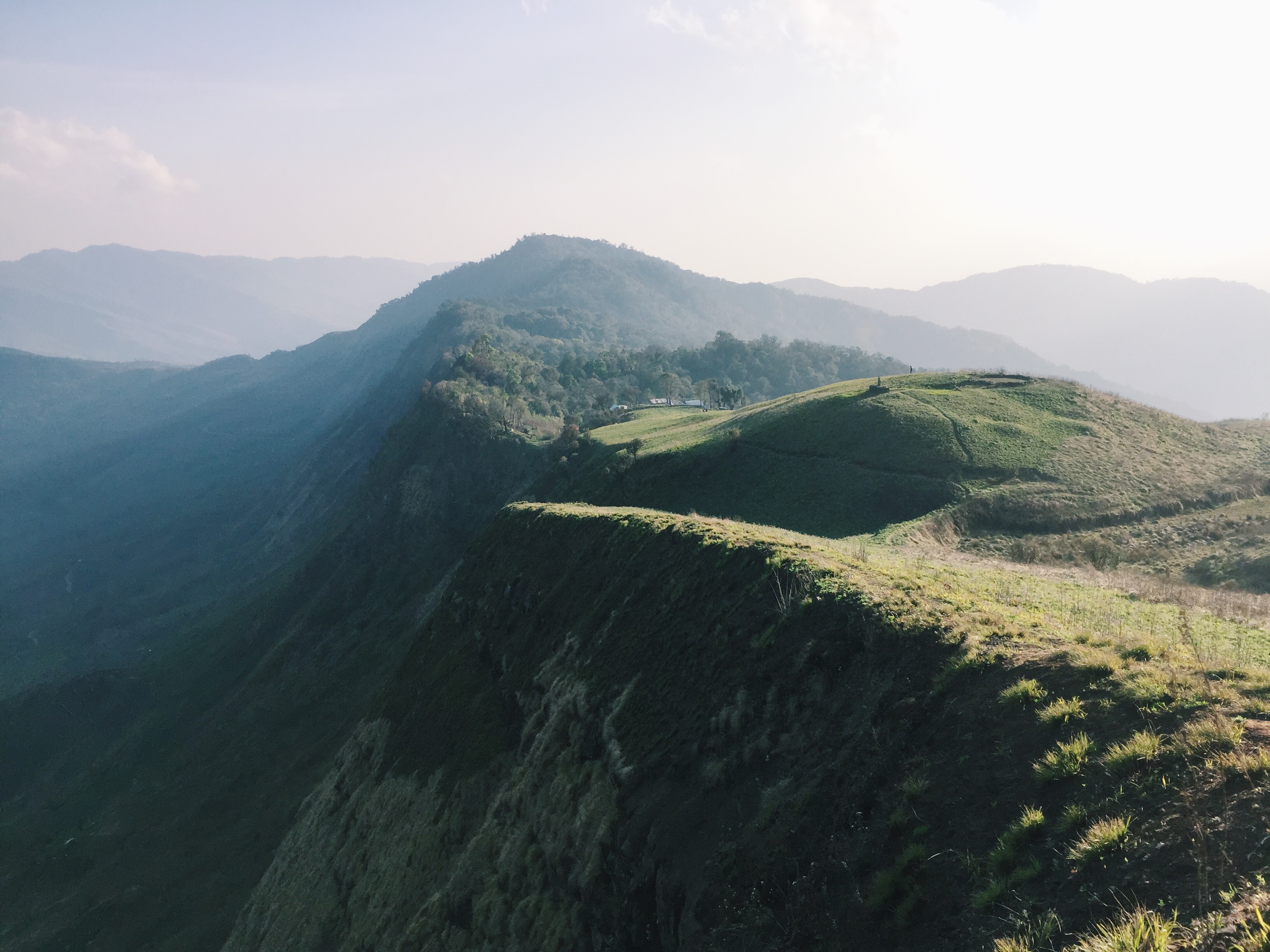

Highest point
- Elevation: 2,620 m (8,600 ft)
- Coordinates: 25.5325°N 94.2983°E

Geography
- Location within Nagaland Location within India Location within Asia Location within Earth
- Location: Zhavame, Phek District, Nagaland, India

Kapamüdzü is a mountain peak in the Phek District of the Indian state of Nagaland. Standing at an elevation of 2,620 m (8,596 ft), it is the fourth-highest peak in Nagaland and also the highest table mountain in the state.

== Gallery ==
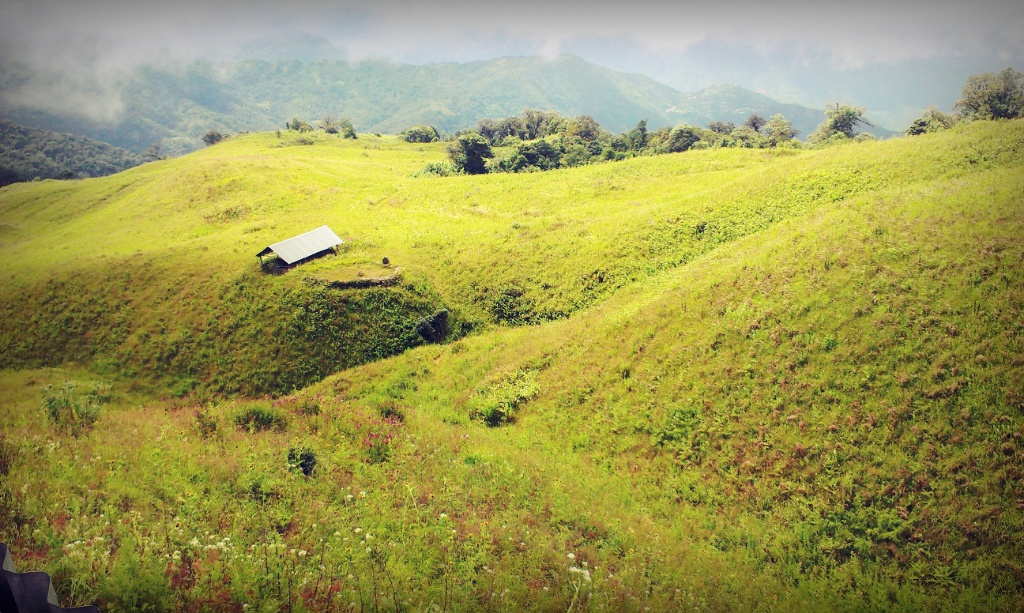
Landscapes around Kapamüdzü
