= Porba =

Porba is a village situated in the Phek District of the Indian state of Nagaland, 70 km away from the state capital, Kohima and 8 km from Pfütsero. According to the 2011 Census of India, the population was listed at 2,764. Other estimates put it much higher today, with recent estimates by community elders putting the current population closer to 6,500 people.

  - First settlers: Dzüdo had a son named Puyo-o who was born in Viswema. When Puyo-o was living in Phesachodu two sons were born to him: Zhovenü and Thürikha. Thürikha had four sons: Ren, Dzuyiemo, Mürora and Porüyi. Porüyi came and settled in the current location of the village thus it was named after him as PORBA erstwhile 'Porüba'. It is estimated that the current generation of people of the village is the twelfth generation since its inception. Thus, it is believed that the first settler came at around 1700-1730 AD.

Porba is a Christian village with three different denominations namely : Baptist, Christian Rivival and Catholic.

Most of its inhabitants practices paddy and terrace cultivation. Porba village is known for its popular "Fish Festival", locally known as "Khilü Nye", celebrated annually on 15 November.

Administratively, Porba village is geographically divided into three Khels and two Colonies. These are Basapümi Khel, Ciekömi Khel, Kösozumi Khel, Ciepi Colony, and Ngoritsükü (Medical Colony). The three Khels form the older part of the village.
