= Tzürangkong =

Tzürangkong Range

Geography
- Country: India
- State: Nagaland
- District: Mokokchung

Tzürangkong Range is one of the smallest ranges in Mokokchung District in the Indian state of Nagaland. It consists mainly of new villages formed from other older villages of other ranges. It is also the lowest range (also known as the Naga Foothills) and borders Assam, an Indian state. The range is first encountered by travellers along the Mokokchung-Mariani road at the Nagaland Gate (or the Tzütapela Gate, in Local Dialect). It consists of villages like Ao Senden, Ao Sungkhum, Chungtiayimsen (or New Chungtia), Watiyim, Longpayimsen, Moayimti, Medemyim, Longtho, etc. On penetrating deeper into the Hills, this range ultimately gives way to the Japukong and Changkikong ranges. Its nearest sub-district headquarters is the town of Mangkolemba.
