= Lhüthiprü Vasa =

Naga politician

Member of the Nagaland Legislative Assembly
- In office 1964–1969
- Preceded by: Office established
- Succeeded by: Yevehü Lohe
- Constituency: Phek

Personal details
- Born: Lhüthiprü Nütsolhü Vasa Dzülhami, Naga Hills District, Assam Province, British India (Now in Phek District, Nagaland)
- Died: Kohima, Nagaland, India
- Party: Independent
- Education: St. Edmund's College, Shillong (B.A.)

Lhüthiprü Vasa was an Indian politician from Nagaland, who was elected unopposed to the Nagaland Legislative Assembly from the Phek (constituency). He was an Independent candidate in the first Nagaland Legislative Assembly election during which he served under the P. Shilu Ao government.
