= Mangkolemba =

Mangkolemba Sub-division
- Sub-division
- Interactive map of Mangkolemba Sub-division
- Coordinates: 26°30′N 94°26′E
- Country: India
- State: Nagaland
- Seat: Mokokchung

Government

Area
  - Total: 845 km^{2} (326 sq mi)
  - Land: 817 km^{2} (315 sq mi)
  - Water: 28 km^{2} (11 sq mi)
- Elevation: 300 m (980 ft)

Population
  - Total: 42,000
  - Density: 51/km^{2} (130/sq mi)
- Time zone: UTC+05:30 (IST)
- Postal code: 798604
- ISO 3166 code: IN-NL-MK

Mangkolemba is a town and sub-division of Mokokchung District in the Indian state of Nagaland. It is also the largest sub-division under the state of Nagaland. The area of this sub-division is 817 km². Coal is found in many places of this area. It covers three ranges, namely, Jangpetkong, Japukong and Tzürangkong (covering about 50 villages).

== Mangkolemba Subdivision Administrative Units ==
1	Mangkolemba Subdivision (ADC Hq)
2	Alongkima Circle (EAC Hq)
3	Longchem Circle (EAC Hq)
4	Merangmen Circle (EAC Hq)
5	Tsurangkong Border Division (BM Hq)

Because of its large size and lack of development there has been a demand for the separate district of Mangkolemba.

Mangkolemba Town

Bounded by rivers and mountains, Mangkolemba town covers an area of about 2 km². The valley is noted for its rice production. Mangkolemba town has a population of about 6000 people and it has about 1300 households. The town is the sub-divisional Headquarters of the three ranges and the administrative units.
