= Loho Lake =

- Location of Loho Lake at the border between Nagaland and Manipur
- Location: Chida Post, Khezhakeno, India
- Coordinates: 25.496839°N 94.229177°E
- Type: Lake
- Basin countries: India
- Max. length: 185 m (607 ft)
- Max. width: 55 m (180 ft)
- Settlements: Khezhakeno

Loho Lake (lit. collection of water) also known as Chida Lake is a natural lake located at Chida Post, Khezhakeno, India. It lies about 4 kilometers from Khezhakeno and is located at the border of the Indian states of Nagaland and Manipur. Although, according to the map of the Survey of India, Loho Lake is located on the border, the area around the vicinity of the lake (Chida Post) is under the state of Nagaland.

== Access ==
=== Transportation ===
The Asian Highway 1 and the NH-2 pass through its foothills. The nearest airport is Dimapur Airport at Chümoukedima–Dimapur near the Assam border about 65 kilometres (40 miles) away from Khezhakeno.
