= Chekrovolü Swüro =

Indian archer

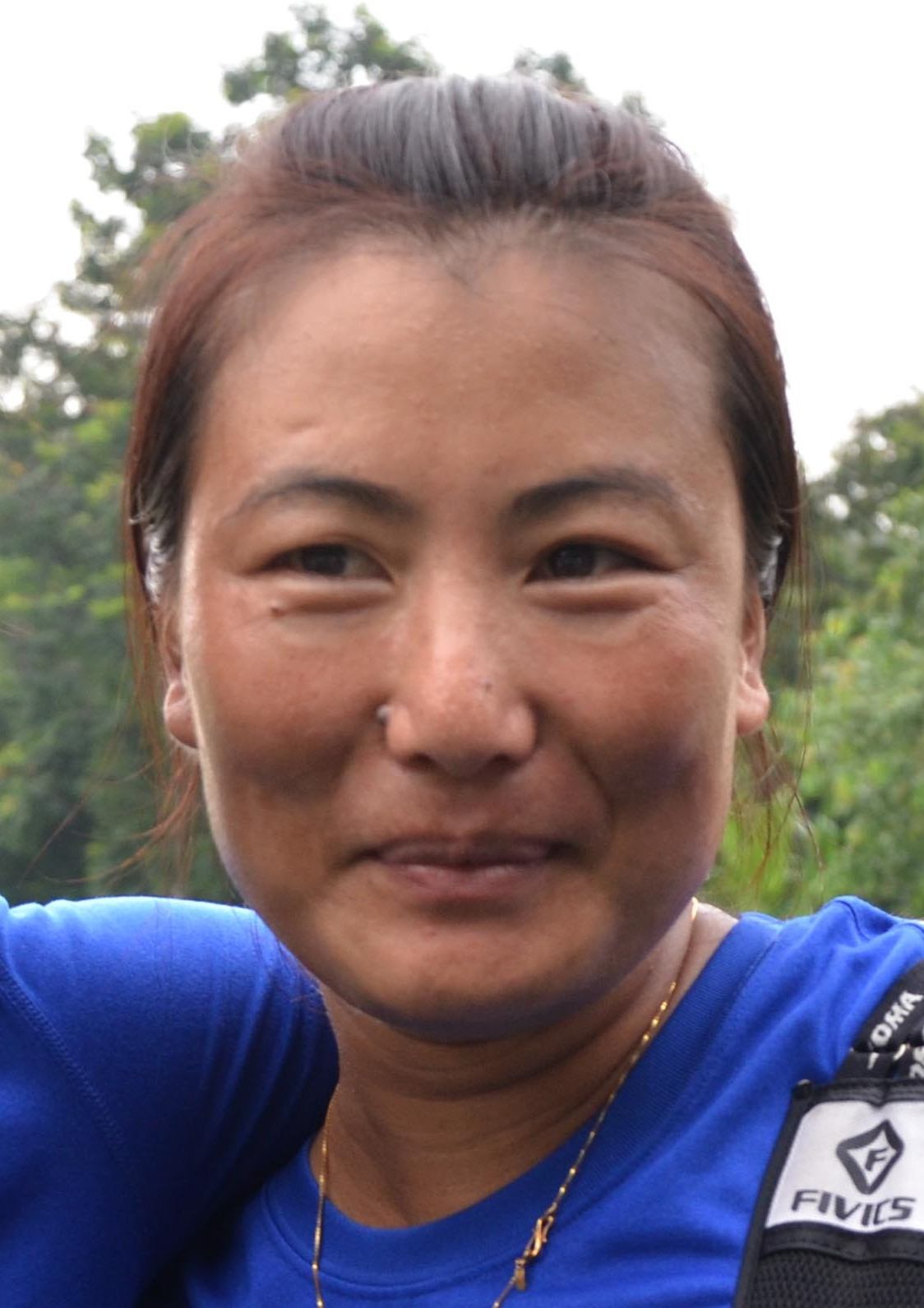
- Chekrovolü Swüro, in 2012

Personal information
- Nationality: Indian
- Born: 21 November 1982 (age 43) Dzülhami, Phek District, Nagaland, India

Sport
- Country: India
- Sport: Archery
Medal record
Women's recurve archery
Representing India
Asian Championships
Bronze medal – third place	2005 New Delhi	Team
Bronze medal – third place	2007 Xi'an	Team
Bronze medal – third place	2011 Tehran	Team

Chekrovolü Swüro (born 21 November 1982) is an Indian archer from Nagaland. She represented India in archery in the 2002 Asian Games and 2006 Asian Games held at Busan, South Korea, and Doha, Qatar, respectively. She was a member of the silver medal-winning team in the 2011 World Archery Championships, held at Turin, Italy. By winning a silver medal in the team event at the 2011 World Archery Championships in Turin, she qualified for the 2012 Summer Olympics in both women's individual and team archery.

== Personal life ==
Swüro lives in Chümoukedima, Nagaland. She serves as Deputy Superintendent of Police (DSP) in the Nagaland Armed Police (NAP). Her elder sister, Vesüzolü S. Vadeo, was a former national archer. She has been competing at the international level for more than a decade, during which she has won many medals. Swüro represented India at the 2012 London Olympic Games. She is the second Naga athlete to participate in the Olympics after a gap of 64 years.

== Awards and recognition ==
- Arjuna Award: 2013
- Dr. T. Ao Award: 2012

== Career in Archery ==
2001 12th Asian Archery Championship Hong Kong; Indv. Qtr Final
2002 2nd Asian Archery Championship, China; Indv. Qtr Final
2002 14th Asian Games, Busan, Korea; Indv. Qtr Final
2003 13th Asian Archery Championship, Myanmar; Team
2005 World Archery Championship Madrid, Spain; Team
2005 Asian Archery Championship New Delhi, India; Team Bronze
2006 Commonwealth Archery Champ. Jamshedpur, India; Team Gold
2006 Asian Games, Doha, Qatar; Participated
2007 15th Asian Archery Championship, China; Team Bronze
2007 World Cup Stage IV, Dover, Great Britain; Team Bronze
2007 World Archery Championship, Dover, Great Britain; Participated
2009 16th Asian Archery Championship, Bali, Indonesia, Team 4th Position
2011 World Cup Stage 2, Antalya, Turkey; Team Bronze
2011 World Archery Championship, Turin, Italy; Team Silver
2011 World cup Stage 3, Turin, Italy; Team Silver
2012 Summer Olympics in both women's individual and team archery; Participated

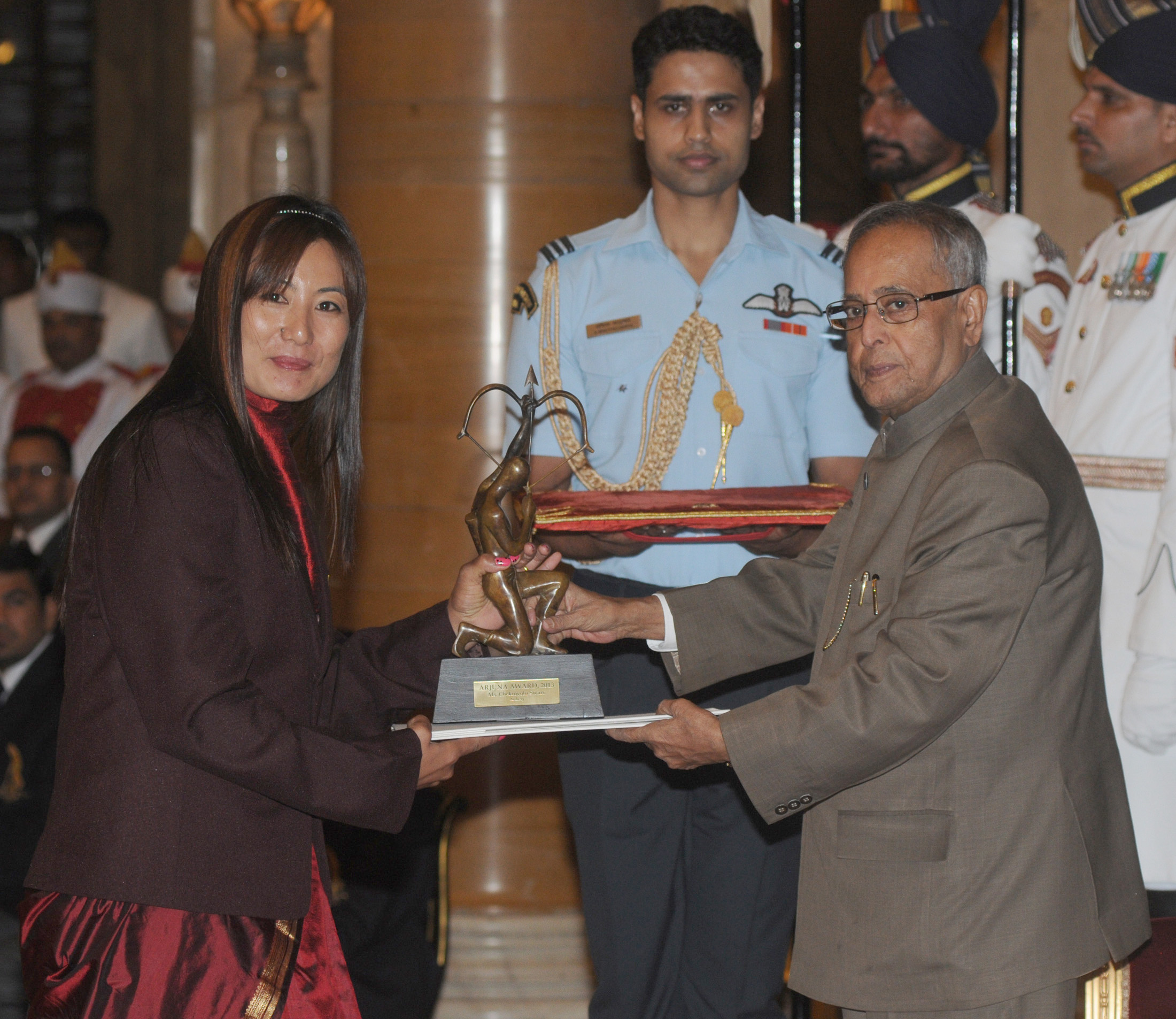
President of India, Pranab Mukherjee presenting the Arjuna Award to Swuro
