= Pfütsero =

- Town
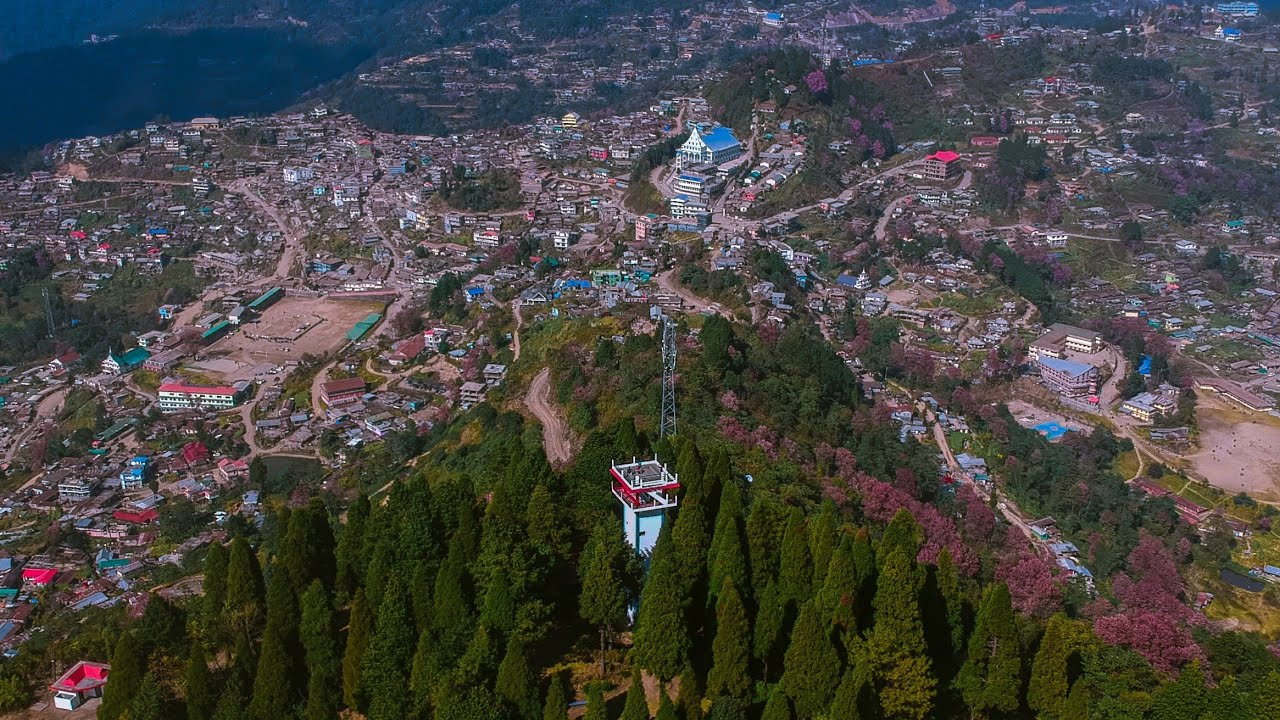
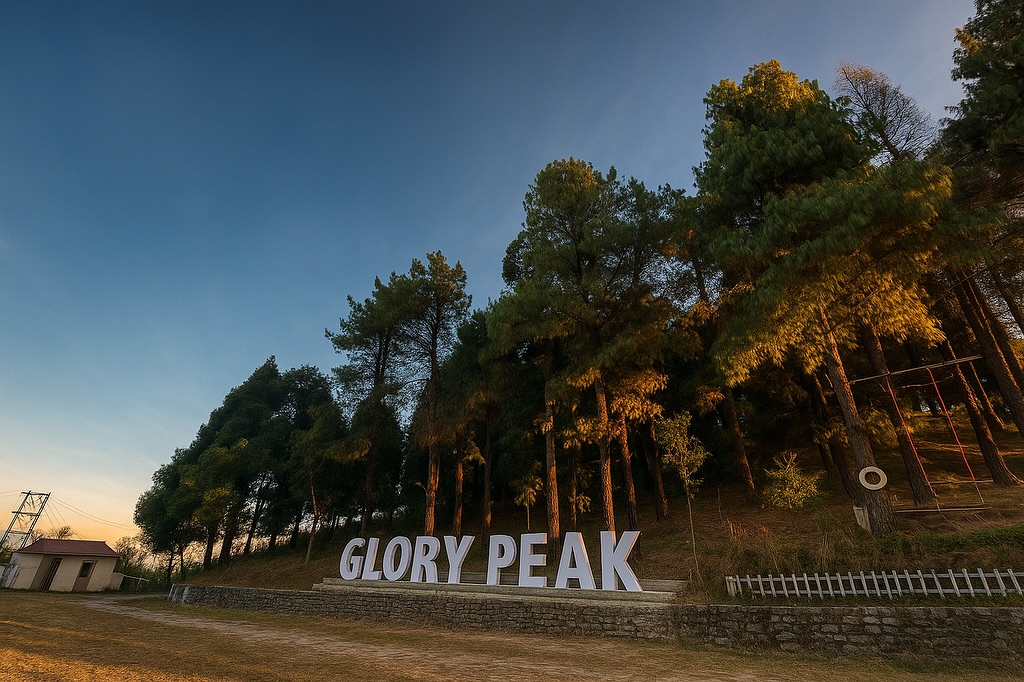
- Aerial view of Pfütsero from Glory Peak Glory Peak
- Interactive map of Pfütsero
- Coordinates: 25.571°N 94.301°E
- Country: India
- State: Nagaland
- District: Phek

Government
  - Type: Town Council
  - Body: Pfütsero Town Council
  - Chairperson: Mikha Kenye (IND)
  - Deputy Chairperson: Khazü Dukru (Naga People's Front)
- Elevation: 2,133 m (6,998 ft)

Population (2011)
  - Total: 10,371

Languages
  - Official: English
  - Major languages: Angami; Chokri; Khezha
- Time zone: UTC+5:30 (IST)
- PIN: 797107
- Telephone code: 91 - (0) 03865
- Vehicle registration: NL-08
- Nearest city: Kohima (70 km)
- Climate: temperate (Köppen)
- Avg. summer temperature: 23–27 °C (73–81 °F)
- Avg. winter temperature: 0–12 °C (32–54 °F)
- Website: pfutsero.nic.in

Pfütsero is a town in the Phek District of Nagaland state, India. It is inhabited mostly by Khezhas and Chokris. It is a commercially important town, with trade in fruit crops such as Kiwi, Avocado and Persimmon, shipped via National Highway 29.

== Demographics ==
As of the 2011 census, Pfütsero had a population of 10,371. The population is indigenous, primarily belonging to the Chakhesang Naga tribe, specifically the Khezha and Chokri-speaking communities.

== Tourism ==
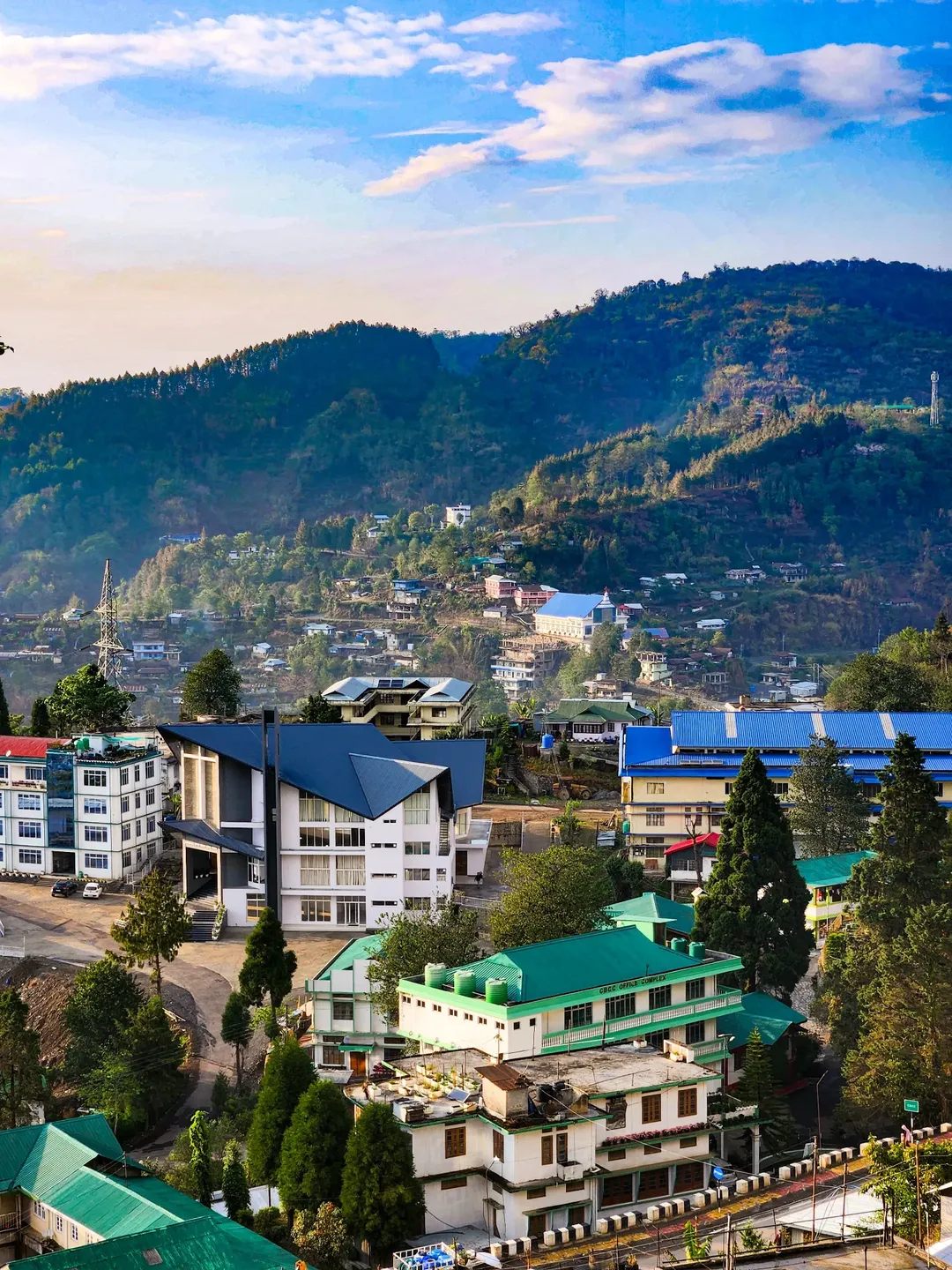
Mission Colony

=== Major landmarks and attractions ===
- Glory Peak: the highest point in the town, at over 2100 meters, offering views of Mount Saramati (Nagaland's highest peak) and the surrounding valleys. The peak is a popular spot for camping and sunrise photography.
- Cherry blossom season: In late autumn (usually November), Pfütsero is known for the blooming of Himalayan Cherry Blossoms, which line the town's avenues and hillsides.
- The surrounding hills provide numerous trekking trails, particularly toward the Kapamodzü Peak, known for its wildflowers and 360-degree views of the Manipur and Nagaland hills.

=== Festivals and events ===
- Tsükhenyie Festival: Celebrated in April, this festival marks the end of the leisure season and the beginning of the new farming year. It is a time of purification and traditional sports.
- Sükrünye Festival: Observed in January, this is the most important festival for the Chakhesang Nagas, focusing on the sanctification of the youth.
- Cosmos Zenith Festival: an annual autumnal celebration held in Pfutsero, typically during the first or second week of November, coinciding with the peak bloom of cosmos flowers across the region. The festival was initiated to promote eco-tourism and environmental conservation.

=== Climate ===
Due to its elevation, Pfütsero experiences sub-zero temperatures during peak winter (December–January), often leading to frost-covered landscapes, which are otherwise rare in the region.

== Transportation ==
National Highway 29 passes through Pfütsero, connecting the state capital to the city and its neighbors.

The state-run bus service, Nagaland State Transport (NST), operates daily routes between Kohima and Pfutsero, following a fixed schedule. Shared taxis are the most popular mode of transport, being faster than buses. Within Pfütsero, movement is largely on foot due to the town's compact nature.

Pfütsero does not have its own railway station or airport due to its high altitude. The Dimapur Railway Station is the primary rail link, located roughly 140 km away. Dimapur Airport (DMU) serves as the closest air link. Travelers typically fly into Dimapur and then hire a taxi or take a bus via Kohima to reach Pfutsero.
