= Pochury Naga =

Ethnic group

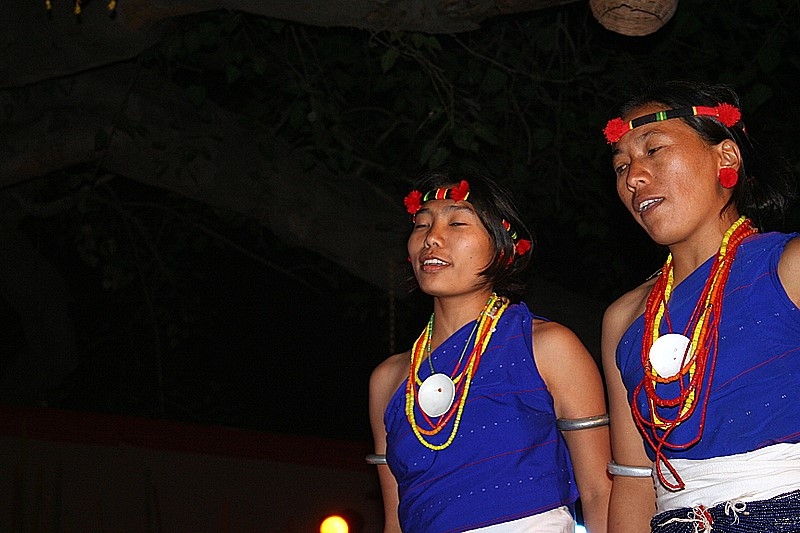
- Pochury women performing Khupielili Dance

Regions with significant populations
- India
- Nagaland: 21,948

Languages
- Pochuri

Religion
- Christianity, Animism

Related ethnic groups
- Other Naga peoples

The Pochurys are a Naga ethnic group inhabiting the Northeast Indian state of Nagaland. They are native to Meluri District.

== History ==
The Pochury identity is of relatively recent origin. It is a composite ethnic group formed by three Naga communities: Kupo, Kuchu and Khuri. The word Pochury is an acronym formed by the names of three native villages of these people: Sapo, Kuchu and Kwiry. According to the Pochuri legends, these villages fought battles against each other, but united into a single ethnic group after their elders negotiated peace. Besides the three main communities, migrants belonging to the Sangtam and Rengma people have also been absorbed in the Pochury group.

An anthropologist has drawn the ethnic lines within some ‘collective’ Naga groups in order to rescue the true ethnic characteristics and linguistic identities of some ethnic group such as Pochury, Puimei, and Zounuo-Keyhonuo. The Pochury was accorded recognition as a distinct ethnic group based on political mobilization which included citing a pioneering ethnographic work in early 1980s (Das, 1994)7. In this official report author reported that “term Pochury is an acronym formed by amalgamation of letters derived from three place-names, i.e., Sapo, Kechuri and Khury. The British described the Pochury as the Eastern Sangtam or Eastern Rengma interchangeably. As per this report the Pochury were distributed in twenty-four villages. Unlike most of the Naga ethnic groups the Pochury have some such clans which have pan-ethnic distribution. In the Meluri area the Pochury people had a monopoly over salt water, spinning, wooden work, leather work and stone work” (Das 1994).7

According to ethnic elders, the Pochuris are the earliest inhabitants of the region around Meluri. A local legend states that their ancestors lived in Yikhrii (Old Phor) a place near the present-day EAC office, Phor Town. The legend states that they sprang out of the soil the place called Zhiipfiikwi. Another legend states they emerged from the earth near the present-day Akhgwo village.

The British administration classified the three Pochury communities as subgroups of other Naga ethnic groups, describing them as "Eastern Sangtam" or "Eastern Rengma". After independence of India, the Pochurys campaigned to be recognized as a separate ethnic group. The Census of India recognized the Pochury as a separate Scheduled Tribe (Sts) for the first time in 1991.

The exonyms used by other ethnic groups for the Pochury include:

- Sozomi, used by Chakhru and Kheza Nagas
- Shantary, used by Sangtam Nagas
- Nyushury, used by Rengma Nagas

In 1947 Christianity was first introduced to Shatiiza Village by Evangelist R.Sarie from Chakesang community. In 1959, the first modern school was opened in Meluri. In 1965, the Pochury territory was linked by road to the big towns like Kohima and Dimapur. Subsequently, the Meluri village developed into a town. Electricity reached Meluri in 1975.

=== Historical society ===
Historically, the Pochurys were dependent on agriculture and animal husbandry. Hunting, forest produce and fishing were the major subsidiary occupations. The Pochurys mainly practised jhum cultivation (slash-and-burn). Limited terrace cultivation was practised by those living in the basins of Tizu and Chichi rivers. For cattle trading, mithun and other cattle were procured from Burma. The trade was based on barter system, which worked well because the different villages specialized in different areas. By the British period, an iron piece (ato) was being used as a currency; two atos could buy a mithun.

The staple food of the Pochury was (and is) rice. All Pochuries, including children, would drink rice beer in large quantities.

The Pochury society has been monogamous since the advent of Christianity. Earlier, both monogamy (kumunyule) and polygamy (amoso) were permitted, with polygamy limited to the rich men. Men with two wives often had two separate households. Both neolocal and patrilocal residences were common. The traditional dowry included a spade, a basket, a spear, personal clothes and food. The bride price custom was practised in all villages except Meluri, Lephori and Tuphruri; the bride price usually included cattle, such as mithun or buffalo.

The status of women was generally equal to that of men. However, in case of a divorce, the wife was granted only one-fourth of her own property, the rest being kept by the husband. In case the wife was involved in a serious crime such as theft or adultery, she had to relinquish all rights over her property. Adoption was allowed, and the adopted children had same rights as the natural heirs.

Each village was administered by a miizaluo (village council), comprising 6-7 elders from different clans. The senior offices were hereditary to clans, but not families. The village chief (kajiwa) came from the Tsuori clan. The office of the first reaper (Nyimzariku Shephie) was held by a woman.

Earlier, the newborn children were named after their ancestors by the elder relatives; now, biblical names are common. The traditional amotsikosi ceremony for the newborns also involved shaving of head. The akonakowe ceremony (ear piercing) was performed when the child reached the age of five. Adolescence rituals were common, but have been abandoned completely now.

Anale, the traditional Pochury religion, involved spirit worship. The important spirits included the sky-dwelling Mukhu-Mutha and Phierony. The village chief was also the seniormost priest, and performed all the important sacrifices. Sierhutho and Tassiatho, the eldest men from the Ngoru and Nyuwiri clans respectively, also had priest-like roles. The medicine men and sorcerers were also present in the society.

== Demographics ==
The Pochury people speak the Pochury language, which has seven different dialects. The dialects includes Miiluori, Phorii, Yisi, Apoksha, Phongkhungri, Samburi [Sangtam] and Kuki. Müluori language is the official language of Pochury people. But Pochury been rich in all aspects have a great language diversity even among its people based on their origin. Pochury language been the official language recognized by Government of Nagaland is known and spoken by its people.

The ethnic Pochury people comprises many clans:

1. Tsuori/Kajiri
2. Nyuthe
3. Nyusou
4. Nyuwi
5. Nguori
6. Phoji/Poji
7. Pojar
8. Katiry
9. Pfithu
10. Jurry
11. Trakha
12. Thurr
13. Thupitor
14. Jorror
15. Jourii
16. Pichurii
17. Leyri
18. Tsang
19. Thiiviiry
20. Liiziiri
21. Joshou (or Joshoury)
22. Thuer
23. Yitsiithu
24. Chugho
25. Achutsea
26. Apungho
27. Chupa

== Administration ==
The traditional village councils are now elected by the people. They retain several administrative powers, although their judicial powers have been curtailed by the government. The village councils elect area councils, which are responsible for welfare and development activities, and also settle inter-village disputes. The Village Development Board, with 5-6 members, supervises the execution of development schemes within a village, under the leadership of village council chairman.

== Economy ==
Agriculture and animal husbandry continue to the main occupations, but many Pochurys have taken up other jobs. Many farming families are now above the Subsistence level thanks to the modern equipment, scientific techniques, irrigation channels, government subsidies and new crops.

== Family life ==
Christmas has been an important festival since the conversion to Christianity. "Yeshii" [in phorii] commonly known "YEMSHI" is an annual traditional festival celebrated by all the Pochuri communities. A combination of their different festivals, it is celebrated on 5 October. Other major Pochuri festivals include Nazu (celebrated for ten days in February). the name Pochury is taken from the acronym "Pochuri" which is made up from Sapo (Po), Küchuri (Chu) and Khwiri (Ri or Ry).

At present, besides the above subgroups, Pochury comprises various clans such as; Meluri-Lephori group, Phor-Yisi group, Lüruri group and Akhegwo group. These groups of people are different from each other – linguistically, culturally and traditionally.

Due to the complexity in the nature of the ethnic group, coupled with non-availability of substantial written information about Pochury society, particularly on women related issues, all the writing has to be solely depends on interview with the elders of different groups and personal observation.

=== Status of women ===
Though Pochury comprises many groups, generally, the position of the Pochury women are not deemed as equals in the society. Traditionally, however, they share equal responsibilities with men in agricultural activities and domestic works.

Women are forbidden from participating in any decision making, war, hunting and fishing. Women are not even supposed to touch the weapons of a man. It was believed that a man would not kill any wild animal if his weapons were touched by a woman.

Among the Phor group of people, if a woman is divorced by her husband due to her adulterous act or thefts, no men from the village will marry her.

Among the Meluri-Lephori group, though women, irrespective of age may be present during wild animal kills or a fish catch sharing, will be ranked at the bottom. While menfolk follow an order from oldest to youngest, where the oldest get the biggest share followed down to the youngest.

After the death of her husband, a widow becomes the head of the family until her male children got married. Though a widow may head the family, she cannot sell her husband's properties without the consultation of her in-laws.

PROPOSAL

The marriage proposal is normally initiated by the boy's family but it is not rigid. In some cases even the girl's family or relatives can indirectly approach the boy's family. Marriage can only happen after the boy attain maturity and has learnt to shoulder responsibilities during the time spent in the "MORUNG" (Men's dormitory, which acts as a learning institution). Arranged marriage was also practice in case of the girl, but in most cases it was the boy who had to choose his bride. He discloses to his parents about his choice first. Then an intermediary or matchmaker, who plays an important role, takes the marriage proposal to the parents and it his responsibility to try and convince them to accept the proposal. Engagement is indicated through exchange of wine, which is again done through the intermediary. Marriage date was usually fixed for the month of February specially 28 February as a part of the Nazhu festival. For second to re-marriage there was no particular season, they were free to marry any time.

=== Engagement ===
The parent of the boy normally approaches the girl's family through a mediator. However, among the rich, the boy's father may directly approach the girl's family. Among the Yisi group it was either a boy grandparents or Amüjipa (clan's taster) will go and ask the hand of a girl in marriage to their boy. If the proposal is agreed upon by the girl and her parent, there will be an exchange of spade between the two families known as Pvimünüyü. The Akhegwo group has a practice that until the proposal was accepted by the girl's parent; they would not offer anything or comply with their request for drinks or light to light their way home, since proposals were made usually at night. After the acceptance, spades were exchange. Whereas, Phor group gifts the girl a bone necklace. Among the Lüruri group, instead of a gift to the girl, the girl family will send one of the younger brothers to the boy's house as an observer till the marriage.

=== Child engagement ===
Child engagement was also practiced by the Phor-Yisi, Lüruri and Akhegwo group of Pochury. This practice was restricted to close friend's children. In some cases, engagement was done even before birth.

=== Marriage ===
The age and rules for marriage were determined by economic status of the family, with the rich arranging marriages of their sons and daughters at the age of 17 and 15 respectively, while the poorer section of people having to wait until 25 and 20 respectively.

While choosing a bride, the family of a man does not look so much at the beauty of a girl. Their chief concern is her abilities. They first find out how she can work at home and in the fields and how quickly she can spin and weave cloth. It is also customary that Lüruri women will not find a partner if she is not tattooed (Tattoo to be included). The art of making earthen pot is another qualification that women should possess to attract a suitor. They believe that the wealth and welfare of the family greatly depends on the abilities and diligence of the wife.

The Yisi group has a tradition that during a negotiation for final dowry, the girl's and boy's relatives will feast at their respective houses. In some cases, the girl's family hosts thritüteü (drinks party) for the boy's relatives or sometimes, for the whole villagers. Only after the finalisation and payment of dowry, the girl will be escorted by the amüjipa (taster) along with her two friends to her husband's house. This escorting is known as küghalura. On reaching the groom's house, he ensures that the girl steps into her new home with her right foot (which signifies the establishment of goodwill and fortune with her new home). Her two friends will stay with her for two days. After the two days are over, she would prepare a special food for her departing friends and send them home.

In the Meluri-Lephori group, it is customary for the father to build a new house for his son before the marriage. All marriages are customarily performed during Nazu festival. Whereas, for the Akhegwo, Phor-Yisi and Lüruri group it was performed only after the harvest. All marriage ceremonies are conducted at night usually starting in the evening; sometimes the ceremonies lasted till midnight. During the first night, the newlywed couple is forbidden to sleep together. The bride will have to sleep with her friends at her new home while the bridegroom will sleep in the Awiekhu (Morung). It was also mandatory, in the Yisi group, for the bride to fetch either water or brine early the first morning at her new home after the marriage.

Marriage within the same clan is forbidden. If done so, they are either separated or the whole menfolk of the village have to perform a cleansing ritual which involves feasting in the outskirt of the village near a water source. The leftover meat or food items are forbidden to be brought home.

A girl to her new home (i.e. at her husband home) on the first day, at dawn she along with her friends will go and fetch either water from the pond or brine.

=== Elopement ===
If a young couples marry through elopement, their marriage can only be legalised by the village authority and the family concerned after performing ritual.

=== Dowry ===
Dowry was not common among the Meluri-Lephori group. Among the Yisi group, the price of a bride is very high. Right after the engagement 5 (five) coins are to be paid to the girl's family as kükhayü which means the reservation fee. A rich family also gives ashiphü which is a buffalo, a mithun or its equivalent in money to the girl's family. Another 50 pieces of coins known as pithayü achafü (second dowry) was given to the girl's family before marriage. Another dowry, münüyü, consisting of either an adult pig or five to ten pieces of coins was paid by the boy's parent. All dowries have to be clear before marriage ceremony.

=== Gifts from the bride's parents ===
It was mandatory for the bride's parent to give seeds, a dao, an axe, pots, baskets, necklaces, armlets, shawls etc. and necessary house wares.

Meluri-Lephori group has a tradition that during marriage, 2 (two) dhaks of firewood of a local tree species known as Mütuseü were gifted to the girl by her parent.

A cultivable plot of land known as Asuohzhuh by the Meluri, Phichü by the Phor-Yisi or Awayu by the Akhegwo was lent to the girl on marriage. This plot of land would be cultivated by her during her lifetime. This is returned to her parent after her death. Whereas, among the Meluri-Lephori group it has to be bought back by her brother's grandsons.

=== Divorce ===
Divorces were handled by the village authority. Cases of divorce are normally penalised by fine. Among the Phor group, if the wife commits adultery, her paramour has to pay a fine which consists of the best cultivable land.

If the wife or her parent desires that they be remarried, they have to send her back and a plot of land known as Tsikhiyo is given as reparation.

A divorced widow has the right to take back all the goods she brought with her during their marriage, including Asuohzhuh, Phichü or Awayu. Phichü is automatically retained by the husband if the divorce was on grounds of adultery or theft.

=== Widows ===
A widow, after the death of her husband, becomes the head of the family if her children are still unmarried and holds the responsibility of a husband.

If a widow has a male child and wishes to return to her parent or to remarry, she does not get any share of the movable properties of her late husband. Among the phor, if Ahdzii (party given after death) is done by the widow's relatives they can take the properties too. Among Yisi group, if a widow does not have a child or has only a girl child, their moveable properties will be divided into two equal shares between her husband's relatives and her parent. Whereas, among the Meluri-Lephori group, a widow gets only one third of the share. A girl child, unlike her brothers, does not receive any share after her father's death. She will be given only müxükhiya (consists of necessary seeds) which she would need once she gets married. All the properties passed down by the husband's forefathers will remain with the late husband's relatives.

A widow may head the family but she cannot accompany the menfolk to various activities like construction or repairing works. Therefore, she is exempt from paying any fines for being absent.

=== Widow remarriage ===
In Pochury society, widows may remarry if she wishes to but have to follow some specific terms and rituals. In a Phor-Yisi group, a widow or widower can remarry only after celebrating two major festivals of the village after his/her spouse's demise which is normally after a year or two. Whereas, in a Lüruri group, a widow or widower can remarry only after his/her spouse's memorial feast is held.

=== Childbirth ===
The birth of a child is always a pleasant occasion for every family. The post natal period accompanies gennas. The poor group has a tradition that after the birth of a child, both mother and child would remain indoors for eight days if it is a boy whereas six days in the case of a girl child. After these restricted days are over, a naming ceremony is held where the child is named after their forefathers.

Among the Yisi group, after the birth of a child, both parents would cook a meal and exchange it between themselves. It is also a tradition that a child be shaved within 10 – 30 days from the day of birth. Whereas the Akhegwo group performs this on the second day after birth. If a child is born at dawn before the cock crows, the child has to be shaved on the day of birth. During this ceremony, a feast used to be hosted by the maternal parents but they themselves are forbidden to partake in the feast. But they can join the feast during the ear-piercing ceremony.

The Meluri-Lephori girls keep shaving their heads until they reach a marriageable age. The age was decided by the clan elders.

=== Daughters ===
The birth of a girl child may not be favoured compared to a boy child in the patriarchal form of society but not unwelcome. Even the girl children were regarded both by society and family. She helps her mother with domestic work and the field.

During Nazu festival (festival celebrated by Meluri-Lephori group) young girls will go and wash at the well/pond. Right after their return, they would cook a special food and feast. Boys are forbidden to eat this food.

Once a woman is married off and settled, two of her brothers are entrusted to look into her well–being. They are required to give help and assistance during times of needs.

=== Inheritance ===
In a patriarchal form of society, all the properties were inherited by the male child. Since Pochury society is a patriarchal society, women do not have any right to inherit any property of their father, which was passed down by their father's forefathers. Even if there is no male child in the family, the relative of the man will inherit the entire property.

A rich parent gifts their girl child with both movable and immovable properties which are bought or earned by them.

=== Death ===
If a woman dies before her dowry has been fully paid, her mortal remains are claimed by her parents and buried at the family burial site.
