= Phek =

Phek Phekredze
- Town
- Interactive map of Phek
- Location in Nagaland, India Phek (India) Phek (Asia) Phek (Earth)
- Coordinates: 25.7096°N 94.4644°E
- Country: India
- State: Nagaland
- District: Phek District
- Elevation: 1,524 m (5,000 ft)

Population (2011)
  - Total: 14,204

Languages
  - Official: English
  - Major language: Chokri
- Time zone: UTC+5:30 (IST)
- Postal code: 797108
- Telephone code: 03865
- Vehicle registration: NL-08
- Website: nagaland.gov.in

Phek (Chokri: Phekredze), is a town located in the south-eastern part of the Indian state of Nagaland. It is the administrative seat of Phek District.

== Demographics ==
According to the 2011 census, Phek town had a population of 14,204, of which 44% were female, and of which the literacy rate was 98%. 1.8% were children aged 6 or less. Since the 2001 census the population of 12,863 had increased by 10%.

Christianity is the religion of 98% of the inhabitants. Hinduism is followed by 1.3% of the population, Islam by 0.2%, and Buddhism by 0.5%.

== Education ==
=== Colleges ===
- Phek Government College

=== Schools ===
- Christian Mission Higher Secondary School
- Holy Care School
- Phek Government Higher Secondary School
- Royal Foundation School
- Bishop Abraham memorial High school

== Head Office ==
Khuzama, Nagaland has a Dear Lottery Head Office , where people from different parts of the region come to get information and related assistance.
