= Küzholuzo Nienü =

Indian politician

Leader of Nagaland People's Front
- In office 2022–2025
- President: Apong Pongener
- Preceded by: T. R. Zeliang
- Succeeded by: Neiphiu Rio
- Constituency: Phek

Member of the Nagaland Legislative Assembly
- Incumbent
- Assumed office 2003
- Preceded by: Zachilhü Vadeo
- Constituency: Phek

Personal details
- Born: 10 October 1966 (age 59)
- Party: Naga People's Front (2003–)
- Spouse: Imlibenla Nienü (m. 2021)
- Parent: K. K. Chire (father)
- Education: North-Eastern Hill University

Küzholüzo Nienü (born 10 October 1966), popularly known as Azo Nienü, is an Indian politician from Nagaland. He has been elected to the Nagaland Legislative Assembly five times from the Phek constituency in 2003 and in every subsequent election.

Nienü has previously served as a minister in the Nagaland Legislative Assembly. He served as the leader of the Naga People's Front Legislature wing from 2022 till 2025 and was former co-chairman of the United Democratic Alliance government in the Nagaland Legislative Assembly.
