= Chozuba =

- Town and Administrative Circle
- Location of Chozuba in Nagaland Chozuba (India)
- Coordinates: 25.7262°N 94.3231°E
- Country: India
- State: Nagaland
- District: Phek District

Population (2011)
  - Total: 3,419

Languages
  - Official: English
  - Major language: Chokri
- Time zone: UTC+5:30 (IST)
- Vehicle registration: NL-08
- Sex ratio: 1042♂/♀

Chozuba is a town located in the southern part of the Indian state of Nagaland. It serves as an Administrative Circle in the Phek District of Nagaland and is located about 71 km east of the state capital Kohima.

== Administration ==
An Additional Deputy Commissioner's (ADC) office of Phek District is located at Chozuba. Under the division there are 7 (seven) villages.

- Chozuba Hq (3,543)
- Chozuba village (3,419)
- Yoruba (3,353)
- Thuvopisü (2,624)
- Rünguzumi Nagwu (1,193)
- Rünguzumi Nasa (335)
- Khusomi (265)
- Chozu Basa (104)

The Chozuba Town Council was inaugurated on 2 November 2016.

== Demographics ==
Chozuba Town is located in Chozuba Circle of Phek district, Nagaland with total 793 families residing. The Chozuba Town has population of (N) of which (N) are males while (N) are females as per Population Census 2011.

In Chozuba Town population of children with age 0-6 is 604 which makes up 17.67 % of total population of village. Average Sex Ratio of Chozuba Town is 1042 which is higher than Nagaland state average of 931.

== Education ==
Chozuba Town has higher literacy rate compared to Nagaland. In 2011, literacy rate of Chozuba village was 91.19 % compared to 79.55 % of Nagaland. In Chozuba Male literacy stands at 94.79 % while female literacy rate was 87.82 %.
