= Chakhesang people =

Major Naga ethnic group

Chakhesang
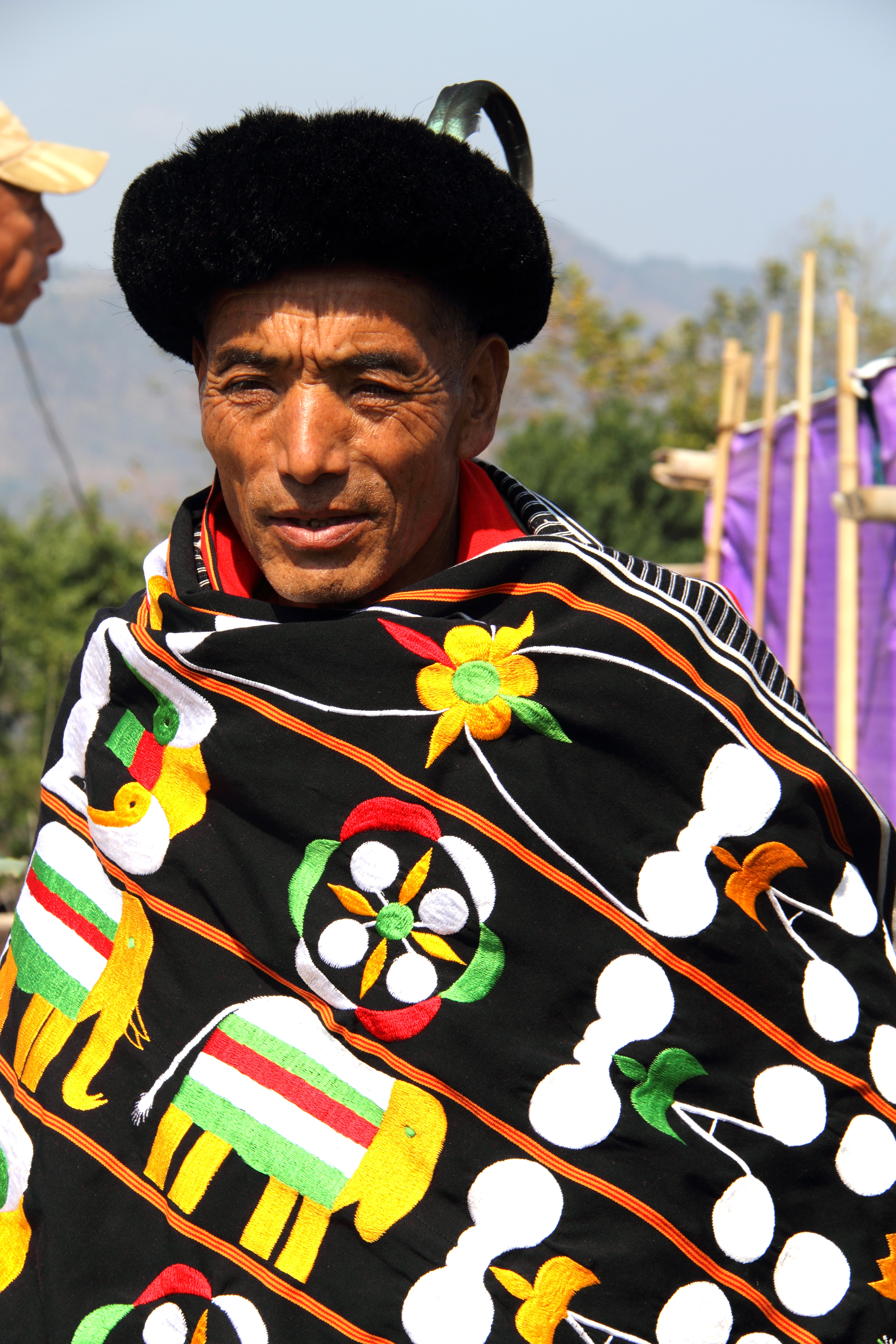

Total population
- 154,874 (2011)

Regions with significant populations

Languages
- Chokri, Kuzha, Sumi, and Poula

Religion
- Christianity

Related ethnic groups
- Tenyimi (Angami Naga · Mao Naga · Poumai Naga · Maram Naga · Rengma Naga · Zeme Naga)

The Chakhesangs are a major Naga ethnic group inhabiting the Northeast Indian state of Nagaland. Chakhesangs were previously known as the former Eastern Angami, now recognized as a separate ethnic group. The name "Chakhesang" was created as an acronym from the names of three ethnic groups: the Chakrü (Chokri), Khezha and Southern Sangtam (now separately known as Pochury).

Most of the villages fall within Phek District of Nagaland. Two Chakhesang villages (Jessami and Soraphung/Krowemi) are located in Ukhrul District of Manipur.

== Notable personalities ==
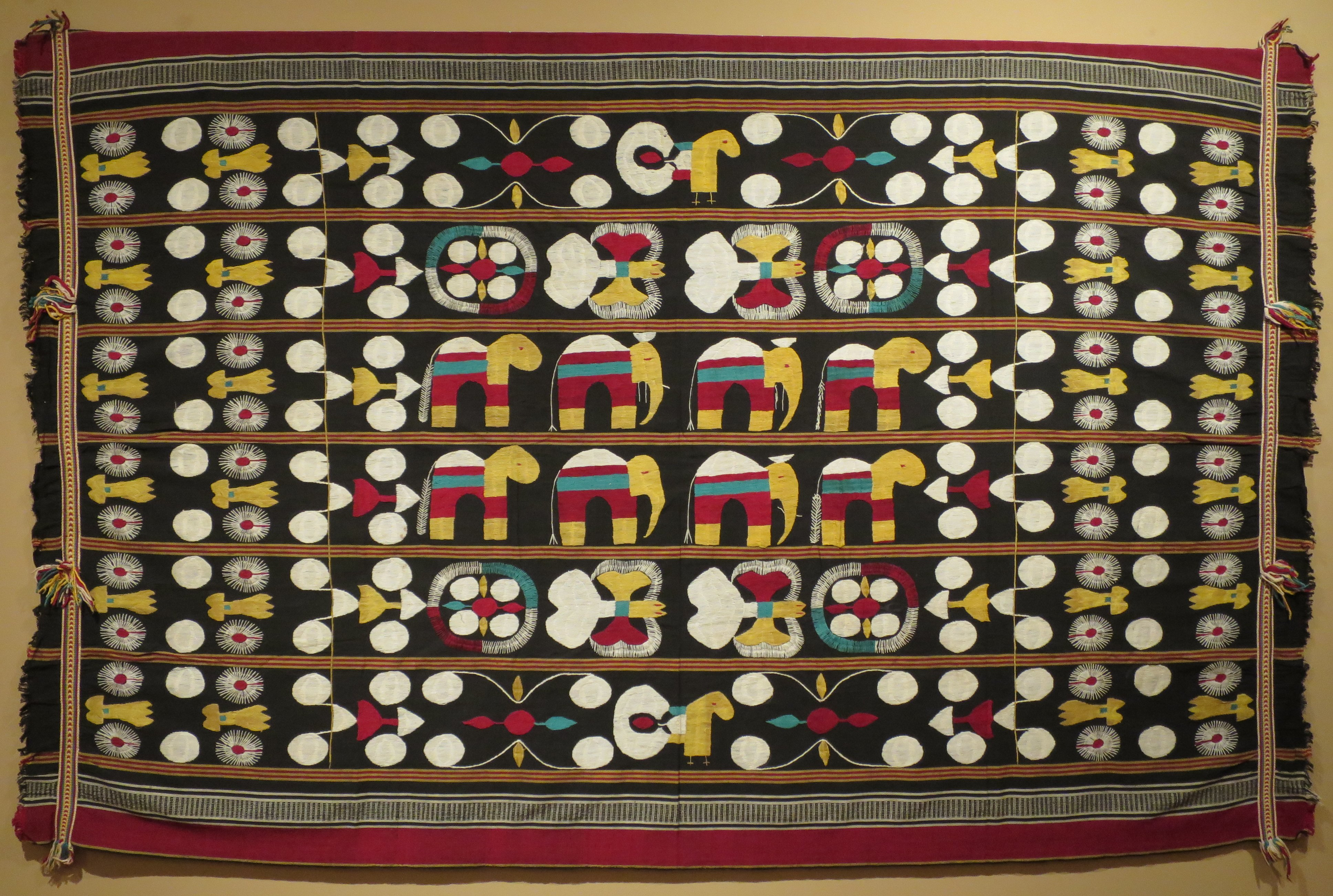
Chipikhwü, at the Honolulu Museum of Art. Miid-20th century acquisition.

The following is a list of prominent people belonging to the Chakhesang community.

=== Chokri ===
- Zhokhoi Chüzho (b. 1984), Actor
- Küzholuzo Nienü (b. 1966), Politician
- Vamüzo Phesao (1938–2000), Politician
- Chotisüh Sazo (b. 1962), Politician
- Chekrovolü Swüro (b. 1982), Archer
- Thenucho Tünyi (b. 1952), Politician
- Lhüthiprü Vasa (1934–1993), Politician
- Mülhüpra Vero (1934–2020), Politician

=== Khezha/Kuzhami ===
- K. G. Kenye (b. 1960), Politician
- Melhite Kenye (1922–2022), Pastor and Agriculturist
- Moko Koza (b. 1996), Rapper and songwriter
- Neiba Kronu (b. 1967), Politician
- Seno Tsuhah, Social activist

== See also ==
- Pochury Naga
