= Phek district =

- District of Nagaland
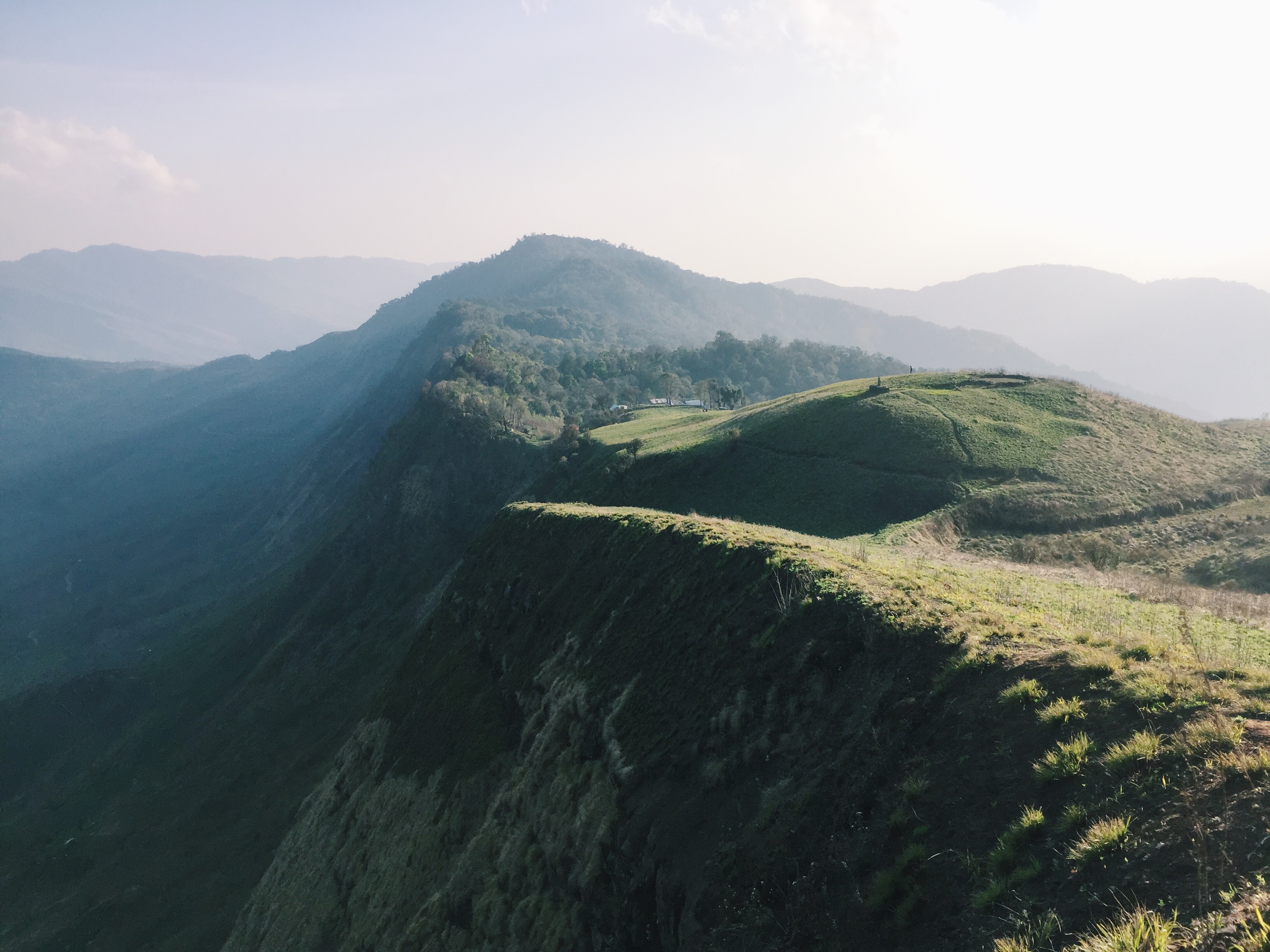
- Kapamüdzü Peak in Phek District
- Nickname: Land of Tradition
- Phek District in Nagaland
- Interactive map of Phek district
- Coordinates: 25.7°N 94.46°E
- Country: India
- State: Nagaland
- Headquarters: Phek

Government
  - Lok Sabha Constituency: Nagaland
  - Assembly constituencies: 5 constituencies
  - Deputy Commissioner: Kuko Mero

Area
  - Total: 2,026 km^{2} (782 sq mi)
- Elevation: 1,524 m (5,000 ft)

Population (2011)
  - Total: 163,418
  - Density: 80.66/km^{2} (208.9/sq mi)

Demographics
  - Literacy: 78.05%
  - Sex ratio: 951 ♀/ 1000 ♂

Languages
  - Official: English
  - Spoken: Chokri, Kheza, English, Nagamese, Pochuri
- Time zone: UTC+05:30 (IST)
- Vehicle registration: NL-08
- Major highways: NH 29; NH 202; NH 702A
- Website: phek.nic.in

Phek district (/ˈfɛk/ FEK) is a district in the Indian state of Nagaland. At 2,026 square kilometres (782 sq mi) and with 163,418 inhabitants, it is the seventh-most populous district in Nagaland and 596th most populous district in India. The district is home to 8.26% population of Nagaland. The town of Phek is the district headquarter, located 120 kilometres from Kohima, the capital of Nagaland and the largest urban centre is Pfütsero.

== History ==
Phek District was established in 1973 when it was carved out of the erstwhile Kohima District. The name Phek comes from the word Phekrekedze, meaning watchtower. The Government of Nagaland approved Phek as a full-fledged district on 19 December 1973. The district has 11 subdivisions, namely, Pfütsero, Phek Sadar, Chetheba, Chozuba, Chizami, Sekrüzu, Razieba, Sakraba, Zuketsa, Khuza, Khezhakeno. In 2024, Meluri sub-division was carved out of the district to form Meluri district.

== Geography ==
Phek District is a mountainous region rich in flora and fauna, with 70% of its land covered in evergreen forest. The highest mountain is Zanibu, with the summit over 2,400 m (7,900 ft) above mean sea level (AMSL). The district HQ town of Phek lies at the lowest altitude of the district at 1,524m above sea level, with the town of Pfütsero at the highest point 2,136m AMSL.

The largest rivers of the district are the Tizu, Lanyi, Arachu, and the three most important lakes are the Shilloi, Chida and Dzüdü. As of 2002, of its 89 recognized villages, twelve were not accessible by road at all, and of the rest, only 24 were accessible by "all-weather roads". Only 9 of the 89 villages were still to be connected to the water supply.

Avakhung International Border Checkpost, also known as Avankhu in Phek district of Nagaland, is an international border checkpost on the India–Myanmar barrier and a highway is being developed as part of the Bharatmala project (2017-2022).

=== Climate ===
The summers are moderately warm with the average temperature being 27 °C without exceeding 32 °C. Monsoon starts towards the end of May and is over by the end of September. Winters are cold, in comparison to the nearby plains of Assam, with the temperature dropping to 0 °C in the coldest months of January and February.

The average annual rainfall is 1,527 mm.

== Administration ==
The Deputy Commissioner's office is located in Phek. The current Deputy Commissioner of the district is Razouvolie Dozo. The district is split into 14 administrative circles, in which Additional Deputy Commissioner (ADC) headquarters are located in Pfütsero, Chozuba and Meluri. A Sub-Divisional Officer (SDO) is located in Chizami and Extra Assistant Commissioner (EAC) headquarters are located in Sakraba, Sekrüzu, Phokhungri, Khezhakeno, Chetheba, Khuza, Zuketsa, Phor, Lephory and Razeba.

== Demographics ==
Religion in Phek district (2011)
1. Christianity (96.8%)
2. Hinduism (2.18%)
3. Islam (0.58%)
4. Buddhism (0.21%)
5. Jainism (0.01%)
6. Sikhism (0.02%)
7. Other (0.12%)
8. Not stated (0.05%)

Historical population
Year	Pop.	±%
1901	17,826	—
1911	26,577	+49.1%
1921	27,425	+3.2%
1931	30,661	+11.8%
1941	30,511	−0.5%
1951	30,299	−0.7%
1961	33,656	+11.1%
1971	44,594	+32.5%
1981	70,618	+58.4%
1991	102,156	+44.7%
2001	148,195	+45.1%
2011	163,418	+10.3%

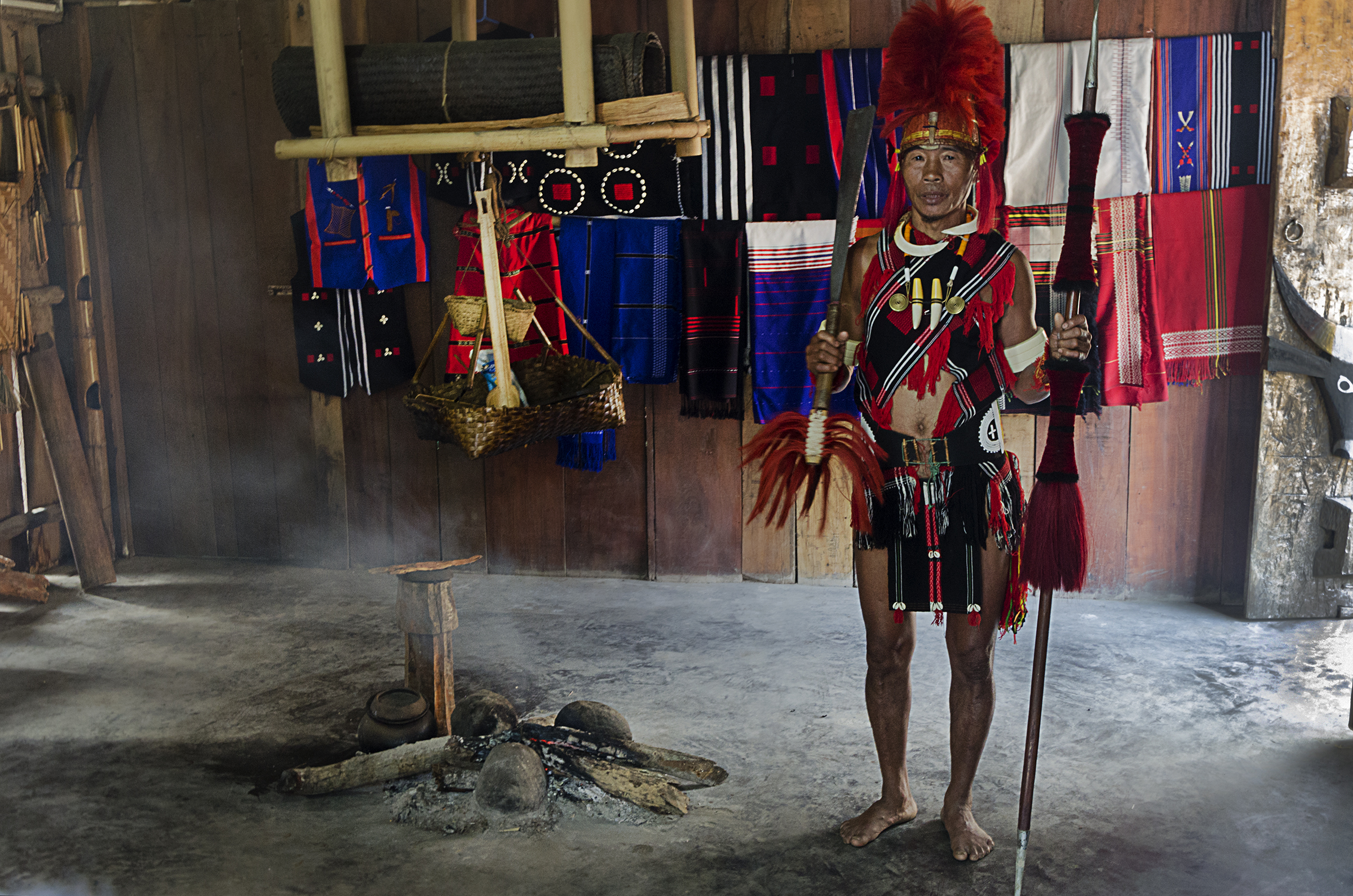
A man of the Pochury Tribe of Nagaland

Per the 2011 census, Phek district has a population of 163,418, roughly equal to the nation of Saint Lucia. This gives it a ranking of 596th in India (out of a total of 640). Phek has a sex ratio of 951 females for every 1000 males, and a literacy rate of 78.05%.

The district is the home of the Chakhesang and Pochury tribes.

=== Religion ===
Christianity is the religion of 97% of the inhabitants. Other religions followed are Hinduism by 2% of the population, Islam by 0.6%, Buddhism by 0.2%, and a few Jains and Sikhs.

=== Languages ===
The following Angami–Pochuri languages are spoken in Phek district.

- Chokri language
- Kuzhami language
- Pochuri language
- Poula language

=== Culture ===
The festivals of Sükhrünyie, Yemshe, Tsükhrünyie and Nazhü are celebrated in Phek District.

=== Towns and villages ===
As of 2011 the 2011 census, the district holds two towns, Phek and Pfütsero, and 117 villages, divided into fourteen admin circles as follows:

Circle	Towns	Villages
Chetheba		Chesezumi (3,470), Thenyizumi (3,275), Thipuzu (3,249), Chetheba Hq (1,915), Khulazu Basa (1,839), Khulazu Bawe (1,669), Rihuba (949), Chesezu Nasa (275), Phuyoba (240).
Chizami		Thetsümi (2,840), Chizami village (2,592), Mesülümi (2,037), Chizami Hq (1,283), Enhulümi (1,014), Sumi (508).
Chozuba	Chozuba (3,543)	Chozuba Village (3,419), Yorüba (3,353), Thüvopisü (2,624), Rünguzumi Nawe (1,193), Rünguzumi Nasa (335), Khüsomi (265), Sheza (104).
Khezhakeno		Khezakeno Village (3,281), Khezakeno Hq (529).
Khuza		Chiepoketa (1,007), Khuza Village (743), Mütsale (663), Tehephu (534), Khutsokhuno (501), Süthotsü (402), Khuza Hq (157).
Meluri	Meluri (5,191)	Meluri Village (2,723), Lephori (1,355), Akhegwo (1,196), Matikhrü (623), Reguri (592), Kanjang (539), Mollen (430), Khumiasu (407), New Akhegwo (305), Kukhegwo (288), Akhen (128), Akhegwo Junction (113).
Pfütsero	Pfütsero (10,371)	Kikrüma (7,298), Phüsachodü (7,275), Pfütseromi (3,378), Kami (1,239), Lekromi (950), R.D Block Kikrüma (571), Kade (147).
Phek Sadar	Phek (14,204)	Phek Village (2,744), Losami (2,246), Lozaphuhu (2,077), Kütsapo (2,050), Phek Old Town (924), Sohomi (558), Kizari (490), Kotisü (455), Phek Basa (434), Lanyezho (319), Tezatse (252), Chosaba (210), Satheri (194), Losami Junction (132), Sürhoba (118).
Phokhungri		Phokhungri Vill. (629), Sutsu (485), Laruri (472), New Thewati (457), Zipu (387), Phokhungri Hq (259), Mokie (214), Washelo (200), Old Thewati (187), Avankhu (186), Letsam (135).
Phor		Hutsu (1,007), Wezeho Town (783), Phor (732), Wezeho (699), Satuza (431), Yesisotha Centre (331), Wuzu (314), Kuzatu (195), Yesi (102), New Phor (523).
Razeba		Zhavame (3,208), Zelume (1,076), Tsüpfüme (1,070), Razeba Hq (780), Zavachu (371).
Sakraba		Porba (2,764), Middle Khomi (1,206), Pholami (1,159), Pholami (873), Sakraba (754), Sakraba Hq (735), Upper Khomi (730), Wibo (538), Gidemi (246), Lower Khomi (236).
Sekrüzu		Rüzazho (2,848), Dzülhami (2,823), Phugwi (1,527), Süthazu Nawe (1,478), Thürütsüswümi (1,010), Khütsami (621), Süthazu Nasa (462), Sekrüzu (394), New Rüzazho (203).
Zuketsa		Leshemi (1,877), Zapami (1,308), Lasumi (1,048), Zuketsa (555), Lowuza (456).

== Government and politics ==
The district has five Vidhan Sabha Constituencies, namely, Pfütsero, Chizami, Chozuba, Phek and Meluri. The last elections were held in 2018. The next legislative assembly election will be held in 2023.

As part of Lok Sabha, Phek district is part of the Nagaland Lok Sabha constituency. In the 2019 Indian general election, Tokheho Yepthomi of the NDPP won by 16,000 votes over his rival K.L. Chishi of the Indian National Congress. The next general election is in 2024.

== Economy ==
Terrace Cultivation in Pfutsero

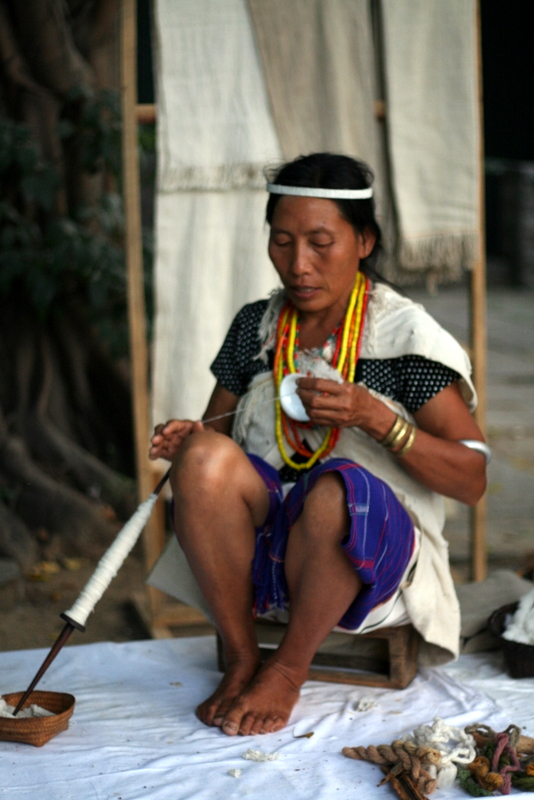
Cotton Processing by a woman of Pochury Tribe

Agriculture is the main occupation with Terrace Rice Cultivation (TRC) as the most predominant throughout Phek district. Shifting cultivation or Jhum Cultivation is a common practice. Important crops produced in the district include rice, maize and millet.

Manufacturing here includes production of salt in Meluri, fruit juice production, weaving, bamboo and wood carving.

== Health ==
The healthcare sector comprises one hospital, two community health centres and eight primary health centres.

== Education ==
The education sector comprises 116 primary schools, 46 middle schools, 18 high schools plus one higher secondary school, and three colleges. The literacy rate of the district is 78.05%.

=== Colleges ===
- Baptist Theological College, Pfütsero
- District Institute of Education and Training (DIET), Phek
- Pfütsero Government College, Pfütsero
- Phek Government College, Phek

== Tourism ==
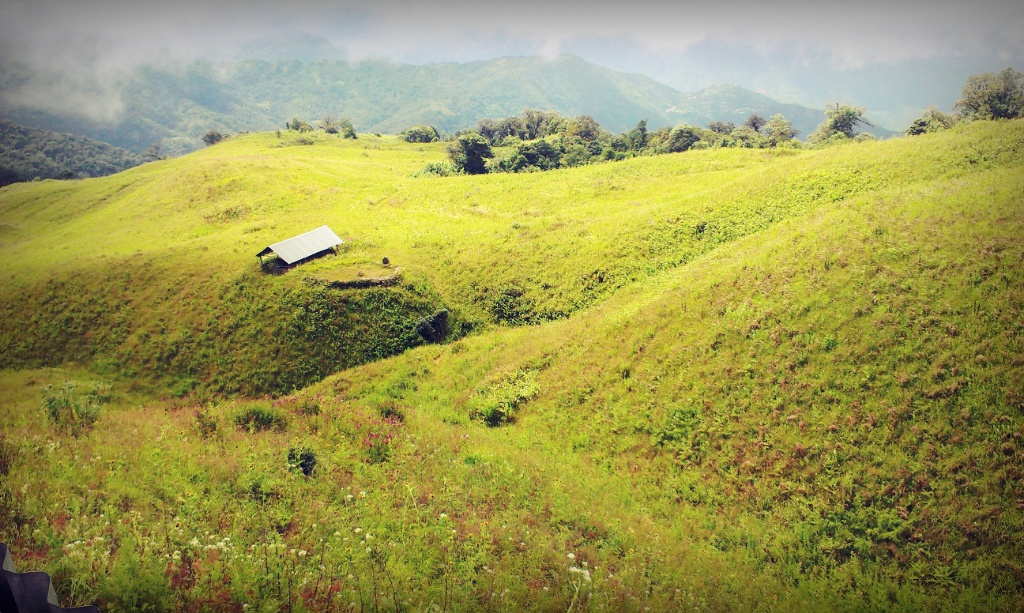
Kapamüdzü Peak

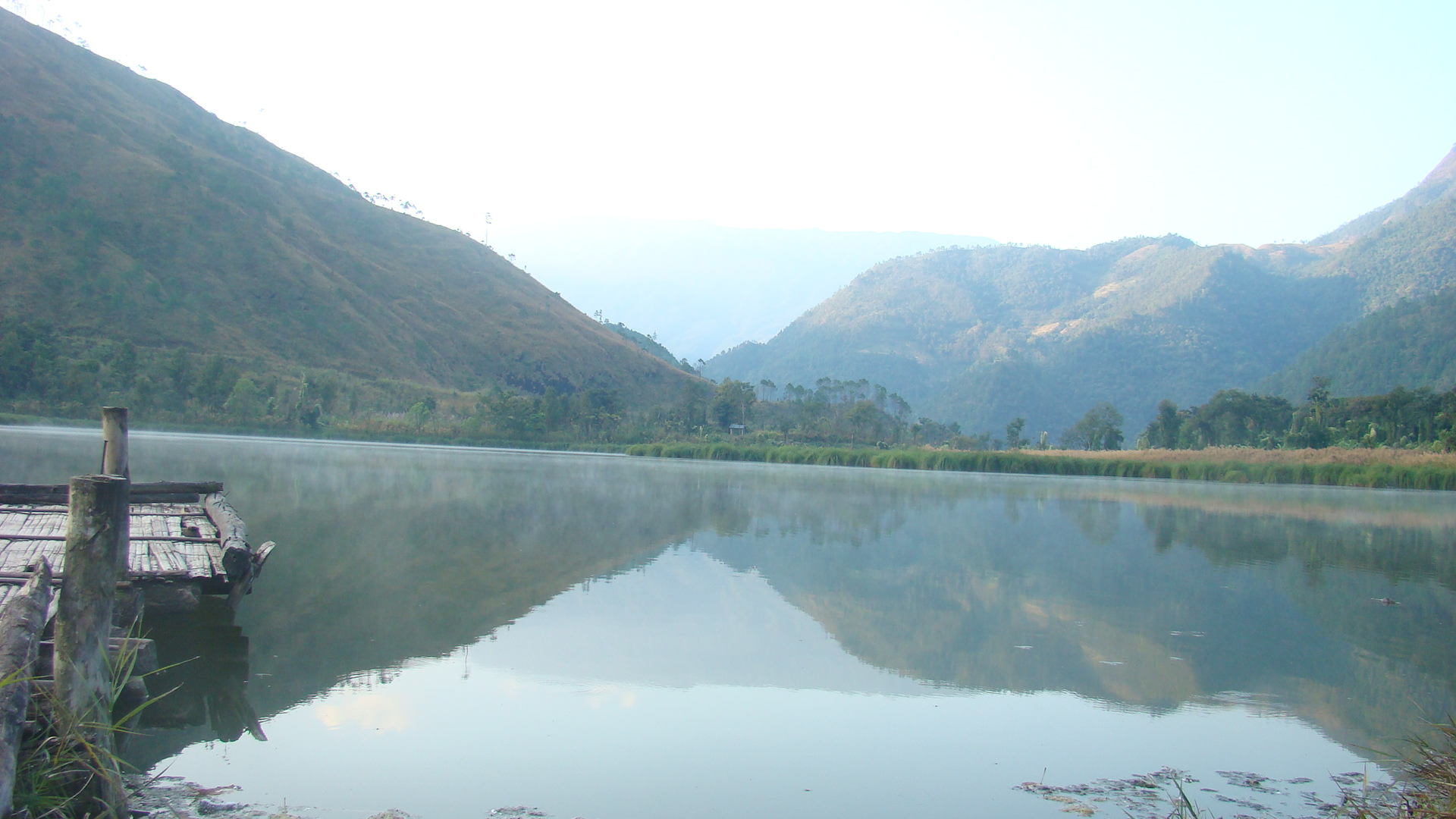
Lake Shilloi

Phek District has numerous tourist attractions to visit and explore. Below are few of the tourist attractions in the district:

=== Lake Shilloi ===
Shilloi, also referred to as The Lake of Spirits. It is the largest natural lake in Nagaland.

=== Kapamüdzü ===
Kapamüdzü, standing at 2,620 metres (8,600 ft) is the highest table top mountain in Nagaland.

=== Khezhakeno ===
Khezhakeno Village is considered to be the ancestral home of many Naga ethnic groups.

=== Glory Peak ===
Glory Peak (2,600 metres (8,500 ft)) is a peak located in Pfütsero, the highest altitude settlement in Nagaland.

=== Rüzazho ===
Subhas Chandra Bose made Rüzazho the operational base of his Indian National Army (INA) during the World War II, when he liberated Mizoram and parts of Nagaland from the colonial British control with the help of Japanese forces. He stayed here for 10 days and recruited more than thousand natives of Nagaland in INA to fight against British, British Indian rupee was banned and Japanese rupee (1942–44) was introduced. "The house in which Netaji lived and the wooden cot on which he slept during his stay in Nagaland are preserved at Rüzazho Village. The love and respect for Netaji are reflected in the local folklore and songs." The village and the operation base of Netaji Subhash is a pilgrimage and tourism site for Indian patriots and history buffs.

=== Terapimithu ===
Terapimithu is a peak standing at 2,232 metres (7,323 ft)

== Transportation ==
=== Air ===
The nearest airport is Dimapur Airport in Nagaland located 193 kilometres from district headquarters Phek. There is a helipad in Phek as well.

=== Rail ===
The nearest railway station is Chümoukedima Shokhüvi Railway Station located 200 kilometres from the district headquarters at Phek.

=== Road ===
The district is well-connected with roads. The NH 29, NH 202 and NH 702A passes through the district alongside other intra-district roads.

== See also ==
- Chakhesang Naga
- Chakhesang language
