= Chizami =

Village in Nagaland, India

Coordinates: 25°36′03″N 94°23′38″E

Chizami is a village in the Phek district of Nagaland in Northeast India. The village has witnessed a revolution in terms of environmental protection & socioeconomic reforms for almost a decade. At present, Chizami is today visited by young generation from neighbouring areas such as Kohima to complete their internships in the Chizami model of development.

== Demographics ==
As counted in the Census 2011, Chizami has the total number of 586 families residing. The total population of the village is 2592 in which 1289 are males and 1303 are females. The total population of Scheduled Tribes resides here are 2565 out which 1275 are males and 1290 are females.

== Literacy rate ==
Chizami village has a total of 1682 people who are educated in which 911 are males and 771 are females.

== Industries ==
The village of Chizami is popular for its Chizami weave in local textiles.

== In News ==
- This small village came into the limelight when North East Network (NEN) had started working towards the success of Chizami village in Nagaland. It is dedicatedly working toward improving the quality of life woman resides locally. NEN generates opportunities in the region by weaving traditional textiles and organic farming which is actually disconnected from the cities.
- Bengali author Debarati Mukhopadhyay tells a horrific cannibalistic tradition of one Jeshumi tribes in her fictional novel Bhoj in a Bengali magazine Nabakallol in 2017. In social media it is alleged that the story is highly derogatory against Nagas culture and defames the Naga people. Mukhopadhyay pleaded that the story based on imaginary Jeshumi tribe is purely fictional and she finally apologized.

== Local codes ==
The Pincode of Chizami is 797102 and dialling code is 03865-264225 with Kohima head office.

== Transportation ==
The transportation is available in these ways.

1. The nearest airport is Dimapur Airport.
2. Phek can be reached by road from nearby cities such as Kohima, Guwahati, and Dimapur.
3. The nearest railway station to Phek is the Dimapur railway station.

== Nearby villages ==
The nearby villages of Chizami are -

- Sumi
- Enhulumi
- Sakraba
- Mesülumi
- Thetsümi
- Porba
- Pholami
- Pfütsero
- Chobama
- Zeluma
- Tekhouba
- Zhavame
- Lekromi
- Kami
- Zapami
- Lasumi
- Khezhakeno
