= Chokri language =

Sino-Tibetan language spoken in India

Chokri
- Native to: India
- Region: Nagaland
- Ethnicity: Chakhesang Naga
- Native speakers: 111,062 (2011 census)
- Language family: Sino-Tibetan: Angami–Pochuri; Chokri

Language codes
- ISO 639-3: nri
- Glottolog: chok1243
- ELP: Chokri Naga

Chokri, (also known as Chakrü, Chakhesang and Eastern Angami) is one of three languages spoken by the Chakhesang Naga of Phek district, Nagaland state, India. There are also some Chokri speakers residing in the Senapati District of Manipur. In 1991, it was estimated that there were 20,000 native Chokri speakers.

== Phonology ==
Consonants
| | | Labial | Alveolar/Retroflex | | | (Alveolo-) palatal | Velar | Glottal |
| | | Labial | plain | sibilant | lateral | (Alveolo-) palatal | Velar | Glottal |
|---|---|---|---|---|---|---|---|---|
| Nasal | voiced | m | n | | | (ɲ) | (ŋ) | |
| Nasal | voiceless | m̥ | n̥ | | | | | |
| Plosive/ Affricate | voiceless | p | t | t͡s | | (t͡ɕ) | k | |
| Plosive/ Affricate | aspirated | pʰ | tʰ | t͡sʰ | | (t͡ɕʰ) | kʰ | |
| Plosive/ Affricate | voiced | b | d | d͡z | | (d͡ʑ) | ɡ | |
| Fricative | voiceless | | | s | | (ɕ) | | h |
| Fricative | voiced | v | | z | | (ʑ) | (ɣ) | |
| Liquid | voiceless | | ɻ̊ | | l̥ | | | |
| Liquid | voiced | | ɻ | | l | | | |

- /b/ is heard as a fricative [β] when before /ɯ/.
- /p/ is heard as [pf] when before /ɨ/.
- /m/ is heard as [ɱ] when before high back vowels.
- /ts, tsʰ, dz/ is heard as [tɕ, tɕʰ, dʑ], /s, z/ as [ʑ, ɕ], and /n/ as [ɲ], all occurring when before /i/.
- /n/ is heard as [ŋ] between two high back vowels.
- /k, kʰ/ can also be heard as [q, qʰ], /ɡ/ as [ɣ], /ɻ/ as [ɣ, ʁ], and /ɻ̊/ as [χ] all occurring in free variation.

Vowels
| | Front | Central | Back | |
|---|---|---|---|---|
| Close | i | ɨ | u | ɯ |
| Mid | e | | o | |
| Open | | a | | |

- /ɨ/ is heard as [ə] in unstressed position.
- Sounds /e, o/ can be heard as [ɛ, ɔ] in free variation.

== Script ==
The Chokri language is largely written in the Latin script.
