= List of populated places in Senapati district =

Villages in Senapati district of Manipur, India

The Senapati district of Manipur state in India has 7 subdivisions. At the time of the 2011 Census of India, the present-day Kangpokpi district (split in 2016) was a part of the Senapati district.

== Blocks ==
The Senapati district has 7 subdivisions or Tribal Development (T.D.) blocks:

- Willong
- Mao Maram
- Chillivai Phaibung
- Song Song
- Lairouching
- Paomata
- Purul

At the time of the 2011 census, the villages in the present-day district were organized into the following three subdivisions; three other subdivisions were split into the Kangpokpi district in 2016.

Name	Population	Effective literacy rate	Sex ratio	SC population %	ST population %	Census code (2011)
Mao-Maram	163380	58.19%	938	0.17%	88.67%	01858
Paomata	53901	47.35%	931	0.0%	98.28%	01859
Purul	68123	59.7%	881	0.01%	98.1%	01860

== Villages ==
Following is a list of the villages as per the 2011 census:

=== Mao-Maram block ===
Name	Population	Effective literacy rate	Sex ratio	SC population %	ST population %	Census code (2011)
Tamphung	653	48.78%	876	0.0%	17.46%	268402
Chakha	862	60.71%	933	0.0%	98.49%	268403
Khangjang	324	72.24%	1000	0.0%	98.46%	268404
Thuyen	969	39.05%	1084	0.0%	92.36%	268405
Yangkhunou	1102	58.75%	937	0.0%	98.55%	268406
Bedramei	832	45.59%	778	0.0%	99.76%	268407
Zenamci	412	83.72%	873	0.0%	35.19%	268408
Zenamyi	412	67.24%	731	0.0%	90.29%	268409
Yangkhullen	4166	29.45%	845	0.0%	89.61%	268410
Kenelu	748	46.27%	953	0.0%	92.65%	268411
Kamalong	777	34.04%	868	0.0%	85.2%	268412
Willong Khunou	1217	81.7%	972	0.0%	97.29%	268413
Willong Khullen	4276	47.02%	854	0.0%	96.63%	268414
Shang Khumei	1068	61.2%	851	8.15%	90.26%	268415
Sangkunglung	762	44.68%	881	0.0%	86.09%	268416
Rajamei	888	59.04%	862	0.0%	50.56%	268417
Oklong	1754	61.39%	909	0.11%	80.62%	268418
Oklong Maryam	560	40.18%	911	0.0%	100.0%	268419
Oklong Khunou	495	67.21%	1071	0.0%	76.36%	268420
Kanem	754	49.77%	741	0.0%	99.34%	268421
Makulongdi	1167	49.95%	935	0.0%	97.17%	268422
Sadim Naga (Emesho Sadim)	1930	27.5%	936	0.0%	59.95%	268423
Emesiiphro	896	89.95%	855	0.56%	35.27%	268424
Maram Khunou	990	39.22%	904	0.0%	71.31%	268425
Katomei	2308	57.65%	963	0.0%	40.99%	268426
Katomei Makeng	463	59.21%	929	0.0%	75.81%	268427
Katomei Centre	517	51.03%	1085	0.0%	99.61%	268428
Makeng Cheijinba Katomei	195	87.04%	1120	0.0%	82.05%	268429
Taphou Naga	2311	70.35%	896	0.0%	46.86%	268430
Taphou Phyamai	1327	87.39%	859	0.6%	94.88%	268431
Taphou Oneame	1102	81.83%	849	0.0%	99.91%	268432
Taphou Pudunamei	668	64.34%	820	0.0%	40.57%	268433
Taphou Ngaihang	206	87.96%	907	0.0%	100.0%	268434
Rikhumai Taphou	1652	81.56%	957	0.0%	94.43%	268435
Ikailongdi	720	69.17%	973	0.0%	71.67%	268436
Makhrelui	5971	86.1%	986	0.05%	89.3%	268437
Senapati	2183	82.41%	939	0.0%	97.02%	268438
Mao Karong	832	45.29%	995	0.0%	98.32%	268439
Khabung Karong	4332	76.44%	943	0.0%	88.87%	268440
Kathikho	870	70.63%	1028	0.0%	66.9%	268441
Maram Mathak Sagei	3385	56.07%	974	0.0%	72.14%	268442
Maram Khulakpa Sagei	3920	50.42%	970	0.0%	99.69%	268443
Maram Makha Sagei	2278	63.05%	979	0.0%	99.96%	268444
Maram Kavanam	1031	79.86%	1083	0.0%	94.37%	268445
Maram Centre	1274	72.75%	1022	0.0%	88.93%	268446
Maram Sagonbam	846	63.32%	843	0.0%	6.74%	268447
Lairoching	2292	74.83%	851	0.0%	53.58%	268448
Mao Marafii	412	69.6%	943	0.0%	100.0%	268449
Khriidziiphi	1084	61.83%	889	0.0%	100.0%	268450
Khongnem	806	35.63%	947	5.21%	94.54%	268451
Puni Pfosemai	832	60.91%	962	0.0%	1.44%	268452
Emefiithumai	708	18.04%	950	0.0%	0.42%	268453
New Maram	582	54.47%	1035	0.0%	94.67%	268454
Toklung	597	77.44%	1066	9.21%	88.44%	268455
Maram Ramlung	677	45.59%	1083	0.0%	96.01%	268456
Maram Bazar	2419	82.99%	935	0.66%	57.96%	268457
Makhan Khuman	1291	34.38%	1036	0.0%	98.61%	268458
Mao Pundung	3718	68.13%	932	0.0%	99.62%	268459
Pungdunglung	685	42.71%	836	0.0%	94.45%	268460
Makhan Khullen	2192	57.16%	969	0.0%	99.73%	268461
Makhan Centre	2333	66.7%	979	0.0%	97.17%	268462
Makhan Lovadziingho	767	34.36%	862	0.0%	80.96%	268463
New Makhan	865	27.68%	989	0.0%	98.96%	268464
Chowainamei Khullen	4705	50.23%	859	0.0%	99.85%	268465
Chowainamei Khunou	3196	44.91%	962	0.19%	99.25%	268466
Takeimei	145	80.16%	1132	0.0%	60.69%	268467
Chakumei	1962	38.63%	1035	0.0%	99.9%	268468
Tadubi	5847	47.28%	956	0.12%	91.09%	268469
Phikomai	1467	63.87%	956	0.0%	97.68%	268470
New Magaimai	571	53.57%	1107	0.0%	98.07%	268471
Song Song	4587	62.32%	1014	0.0%	99.63%	268472
Kalinamei	7053	64.23%	967	0.0%	99.63%	268473
Kayinu	3253	70.7%	897	0.18%	85.8%	268474
Namgailong Rongmei	452	74.53%	915	0.0%	94.47%	268475
Rabunamei	3092	54.18%	1067	0.0%	99.0%	268476
Punanamei	6380	65.85%	955	0.0%	96.63%	268477
Pudunamei	4249	64.59%	946	0.0%	99.69%	268478
Chowainu	2527	48.77%	985	0.0%	99.76%	268479
Robve Solephe	798	6.7%	731	0.0%	99.87%	268480
Tobumei	2761	43.41%	863	0.0%	78.96%	268481
Shajouba	7456	48.74%	938	0.0%	97.04%	268482
Makhel	3095	40.73%	931	0.0%	99.58%	268483
Keibi	4420	45.67%	974	0.0%	92.49%	268484
Khabung	1449	32.84%	902	0.0%	98.96%	268485
Sorbung	967	28.9%	818	4.45%	92.66%	268486
Khamsom	1772	76.92%	901	0.0%	95.65%	268487
Tingsong	1377	80.62%	881	0.0%	86.64%	268488
Ngatan	800	91.3%	1030	0.0%	96.0%	268489
Nsebekie	334	75.61%	1012	0.0%	99.4%	268490
Bollen Kuki	0	NA	NA	NA	NA	268491
Phoibung Kuki	0	NA	NA	NA	NA	268492
Changsang	0	NA	NA	NA	NA	268493
Leisangphung	0	NA	NA	NA	NA	268494
Washangphung	0	NA	NA	NA	NA	268495

=== Paomata block ===
Name	Population	Effective literacy rate	Sex ratio	SC population %	ST population %	Census code (2011)
Laii Sarafii	751	30.04%	1052	0.0%	99.6%	268496
New Laii	515	62.14%	807	0.0%	100.0%	268497
Laii	5518	30.43%	939	0.0%	92.48%	268498
Katafiimei	995	53.41%	936	0.0%	93.47%	268499
Chingmei Khunou	3800	66.66%	859	0.0%	99.5%	268500
Chingmei Khullen	1856	45.58%	849	0.0%	99.62%	268501
Liyai Khunou	1038	41.21%	908	0.0%	99.71%	268502
Liyai Khullen	7153	19.48%	962	0.0%	99.29%	268503
Tungjoy Rikhubumai	1353	52.63%	892	0.0%	99.33%	268504
Tungjoy	5988	58.37%	887	0.0%	98.25%	268505
Paomata Centre	1344	31.54%	931	0.0%	93.97%	268506
Tungam Makhufii	936	66.87%	876	0.0%	97.97%	268507
Tungam Khullen	4495	65.12%	987	0.0%	99.89%	268508
Tungam Afii	1553	23.78%	885	0.0%	98.52%	268509
Saranamei	4254	32.1%	897	0.0%	99.65%	268510
Rakhutao	193	84.66%	856	0.0%	91.71%	268511
Khaikho	1080	22.14%	1015	0.0%	98.7%	268512
Phuba Khuman	5526	67.08%	954	0.0%	99.4%	268513
Phuba Thapham	2512	68.8%	1027	0.0%	99.52%	268514
Maiba	3041	61.15%	968	0.0%	99.01%	268515

=== Purul block ===
Name	Population	Effective literacy rate	Sex ratio	SC population %	ST population %	Census code (2011)
Koide Makha	3760	49.66%	892	0.0%	99.68%	268516
Koide Mathak	4513	55.94%	849	0.0%	90.01%	268517
Purul Rosofii	2287	61.18%	811	0.0%	98.16%	268518
Purul Atongba	5043	57.57%	842	0.0%	99.21%	268519
Purul Akutpa	6168	73.75%	938	0.0%	97.96%	268520
Shirong	1115	62.98%	819	0.0%	99.91%	268521
Lakhamei	4822	54.01%	837	0.0%	99.34%	268522
Kodom Khullen	2120	57.26%	812	0.0%	90.85%	268523
Kodom Khavii	1589	50.12%	908	0.0%	99.87%	268524
Phaibung Khullen	4664	37.31%	974	0.0%	99.38%	268525
Phaibung Khunou	1232	32.35%	987	0.0%	98.86%	268526
Lower Phaibung	990	49.14%	879	0.0%	99.9%	268527
Ngari Raidolumai	1095	82.35%	941	0.0%	99.27%	268528
Ngari Khullen	2098	77.68%	858	0.29%	99.38%	268529
Ngari Lishang	1714	67.52%	894	0.0%	97.08%	268530
Thiwa	1309	89.86%	908	0.0%	99.54%	268531
Thiwa Songdo	173	52.99%	1060	0.0%	98.84%	268532
Khongdei Khuman	3352	70.02%	746	0.0%	98.72%	268533
Khongdei Shimphung	2261	32.76%	835	0.0%	96.15%	268534
Khongdei Ngawar	526	69.2%	1055	0.0%	98.86%	268535
Ngamju	3229	42.81%	943	0.0%	99.1%	268536
Oinam	4328	90.67%	942	0.0%	99.61%	268537
Thingba Khullen	3513	65.65%	898	0.0%	99.63%	268538
Thingba Khunou	4129	62.71%	862	0.0%	99.66%	268539
Keiye	728	53.45%	911	0.0%	99.45%	268540
Raafii	726	65.09%	758	0.0%	98.48%	268541
Kapao	639	35.39%	966	0.0%	92.8%	268542
