= Tenyimi people =

Major Ethnolinguistic group in Northeastern India

Tenyimi
Total population
- Approx. 800,000–1,000,000

Regions with significant populations
- India (Nagaland · Manipur · Assam)

Languages
- Angami · Chokri · Kuzha/Khezha · Emela · Inpui · Liangmai · Maram · Pochuri · Poula · Rengma · Rongmei · Thangal · Zeme; Second language: English · Meitei · Nagamese

Religion
- Majority: Predominantly Christianity in modern times (mainly Baptist and Catholic); Traditionally: Heraka · Pfütsana; Minority: Heraka · Pfütsana

Related ethnic groups
- other Naga peoples

The Tenyimis are an ethnolinguistic and socio-cultural grouping of several Naga ethnic groups inhabiting the Northeast Indian states of Nagaland, Manipur and parts of Assam, who are believed to share common ancestry and overlapping cultural traditions. The Tenyimis constitute one of the major historical and cultural blocs among the Naga peoples.

The Tenyimi grouping includes the Angami, Chakhesang, Liangmai, Mao, Maram, Pochury, Poumai, Inpui, Rengma, Rongmei, Thangal and Zeme communities. In broader cultural discourse, some related groups such as the Sümi Aphuyemis are occasionally associated with the Tenyimi cultural sphere.

== Origins ==
Tenyimi oral traditions trace their ancestral homeland primarily to Makhel, an ancient settlement located in present-day Senapati District of Manipur.

Another important ancestral settlement frequently referenced in Tenyimi traditions is Khezhakeno in present-day Phek District of Nagaland.

== Geography ==
Tenyimi populations are concentrated in northeastern India.

=== Nagaland ===
Major Tenyimi-inhabited districts include:

- Kohima District
- Chümoukedima District
- Phek District
- Tseminyü District
- Dimapur District
- Peren District
- Meluri District

=== Manipur ===
Major Tenyimi-inhabited districts include:

- Senapati District
- Kangpokpi District
- Tamenglong District
- Noney District
- Parts of Ukhrul district

=== Assam ===
Smaller Tenyimi populations are found in:

- Karbi Anglong District
- Dima Hasao District

== Ethnic composition ==
=== Angami ===
The Angamis are found in Kohima District, Chümoukedima District and Dimapur District of Nagaland.

=== Chakhesang ===
The Chakhesangs are a composite tribal identity formed from Chokri, Khezha and Southern Sangtam (Now Pochury). They are found in Phek District of Nagaland, Senapati District and Ukhrul District of Manipur.

=== Inpui ===
The Inpuis primarily inhabits the Noney District of Manipur.

=== Mao ===
The Mao Naga primarily inhabit Senapati district of Manipur and in southern Nagaland.

=== Maram ===
The Maram Naga inhabit the Senapati District of Manipur.

=== Pochury ===
The Pochurys are found in Meluri District of Nagaland.

=== Poumai ===
The Poumais are found in Senapati District of Manipur and a few are found in Phek district.

=== Rengma ===
The Rengma Naga inhabit the Tseminyü district of Nagaland and Karbi Anglong district of Assam.

=== Thangal ===
The Thangal Naga are a smaller Naga community primarily located in the Kangpokpi District of Manipur.

=== Zeliangrong ===
The Zeliangrongs are a composite tribal identity formed from Zeme, Liangmai and Rongmai. They are found in Peren District of Nagaland, Tamenglong District, Noney district, Kangpokpi district, Senapati district of Manipur and parts of Assam.

== Language ==
Tenyimi languages belong to the Sino-Tibetan family, within the broader Naga linguistic subgroup. Major languages include:

- Angami
- Chokri
- Kuzha/Khezha
- Emela
- Inpui
- Lianglad
- Maram
- Pochuri
- Thangal
- Poula
- Rengma
- Ruonglat
- Zeme

=== Tenyidie ===
Tenyidie, based largely on Angami speech, is one of the most standardized literary languages among Tenyimi peoples. It is used in education, literature and church communication.

== Religion ==
=== Christianity ===
Today, the majority of Tenyimi are Christians, predominantly affiliated with:

- Baptists
- Catholics
- Other Protestant denominations

== Culture ==
=== Festivals ===
Major Tenyimi festivals include:

- Chaga Ngee (Liangmai)

This festival is celebrated by the Liangmai Nagas on October 30th and 31st. It spans diverse themes such as purification, reconciliation, and thanksgiving, with communal feasting and cultural displays marking its observance. It involves the act of thanksgiving and charity as a means of honoring God for the blessings that yield bountiful harvests and promote good vitality.

- Gaan-Ngai (Rongmei)

It is a five day festival celebrated during the winter season. It is a festival of light and also a post harvest festival.

- Mlei Ngyi (Zeme)

It is a festival of fire celebrated by the Zeme Nagas to mark the beginning of the new farming and jhum cultivation season.

- Sekrenyi (Angami)

A purification and renewal festival

- Chiithuni (Mao)

The festival is celebrated to mark the end of the harvest period and the beginning of a new period.

- Ang Gee Pheo (Thangal)

This festival is an annual festival celebrating the arrival of the New Year.

- Thounii (Poumai)

Named after the Poula word for the first month of the calendar year, this New Year festival marks the beginning of the annual cycle.

- Ponghi (Maram)

It is a seven day festival celebrated in the month of July on the conclusion of the paddy transplantation.

- Ngadah (Rengma)

It is an eight day festival celebrated in late November right after harvest.

- Yemshe (Pochury)

It is a festival welcoming the harvest.

- Karing-Ngei (Inpui)

This is the Festival of the Living and is celebrated annually in the first month of the calendar year to honour ancestors.

- Tsükhenyie (Chakhesang)

An agricultural and thanksgiving festival is the Chakhesangs.

== Modern identity ==
Contemporary Tenyimi identity has been strengthened culturally through the Tenyimi People's Organization (TPO).

== See also ==
- List of Naga ethnic groups
