= Poumai Naga =

Poumai Naga may refer to:

- Poumai Naga people (Poumai Nagas, Poula Naga people, Poula Nagas, Poula people) - Poumai people
- Poumai Naga language (Poula Naga language, Poumai language) - Poula language
