= Gaziphema =

Gaziphema Vafiimai Laü
- village
- Location in Manipur, India Gaziphema (India)
- Coordinates: 25°30′02″N 94°23′16″E
- Country: India
- State: Manipur
- District: Senapati

Government
  - Body: Village panchayat

Population
  - Total: 5,518

Languages
  - Official: English (Written), Poula (Spoken)
- Time zone: UTC+5:30 (IST)
- PIN: 795104
- Telephone code: +91385-
- Vehicle registration: MN
- Sex ratio: 939 (2011)
- Nearest city: Senapati
- Literacy: 30.43%
- Lok Sabha constituency: Outer Manipur
- Vidhan Sabha constituency: 48-Mao
- Website: manipur.gov.in

Gaziphema, also called Vafiimai or Laü, is a Poumai Naga village located north of Senapati in Senapati district of the Indian state of Manipur. It is bounded on the East by Ukhrul district and Nagaland on the North and West and covers an area of 46.48 km^{2}. According to the Census of India 2011, there are 806 households with a total population of 5518 persons, out of which 2846 are male while 2672 are female, making it one of the largest villages amongst the Poumai Naga tribe.

== History ==
Legend has it that the ancestors of Vafiimai originally came from Mao by hunting a phenomenal seven-horned stag. Chasing the stag, they embark upon the present location of Laii, and as nightfall was nigh, they decided against returning. With no food at hand, they ate the buds of a leafy plant Himalayan knotweed locally called vavu. On finding that the land was habitable and good, the hunters returned home and came back with 16 delegates from each clan of the 16 Mao villages. Thus was the new settlement established.

== Etymology ==
The term Vafiimai has its origin from the plant Himalayan knotweed which grows abundantly in the region. Literally, Va (Vavu) [Scientifically called Koenigia polystachya] is the name of the plant, Fii meaning place, and Mai means people. Hence, people from the land of Vavu. The name Gaziphema has similar etymology as Vafiimai and is what it is known in Nagaland. The name Laii which means God in Manipuri was given by a Meitei Ningthou after a failed attempt to raid the village.

== Culture and religion ==
Like any other Naga village, the people of Gaziphema depend mainly on cultivation and livestock-rearing. Because of this labour-intensive cultivation, land is the most important form of property among them to date. However, with the changing times, many have adopted small businesses and other skilled professions. Several educated individuals and families migrated to various metropolitan cities due to government postings, education and corporate jobs leading to a huge diaspora populace.

During the period of headhunting, the menfolks spent the majority of their time in warfare with hostile villages and taking heads. Since 1879, when the British succeeded in annexing the Naga territory, the inter-village feuds have come to an end. With the introduction of Christianity in the region in the early twentieth century, many of them changed their faith to Christianity. Today, 99% of the population follows Christianity. These Christians are of two major denominations: Baptist and Roman Catholic.

== Location ==
Gaziphema village is located at 25.5004° N latitude and 94.3893° E longitude. It is situated at a height of 1791.5 m above sea level, and lies about 42 Kilometres from national highway 39 at Tadubi.

== Literacy ==
As per the Census of India 2011, Gaziphema village has a very low literacy rate. In 2011, literacy rate was 30.43% compared to 76.94% of Manipur. Male literacy stands at 35.67% while female literacy rate was 24.76%.

== World War II ==
During the Second World War, Gaziphema was a strategic location to the Allied soldiers. In 1944, when the invasion by the Japanese troops was imminent, the Assam Regiment was moved to Jessami and Kharasom via Gaziphema to delay the advance of the 31st Japanese division.
