= Tungjoy Rikhubumai =

Village in Manipur, India

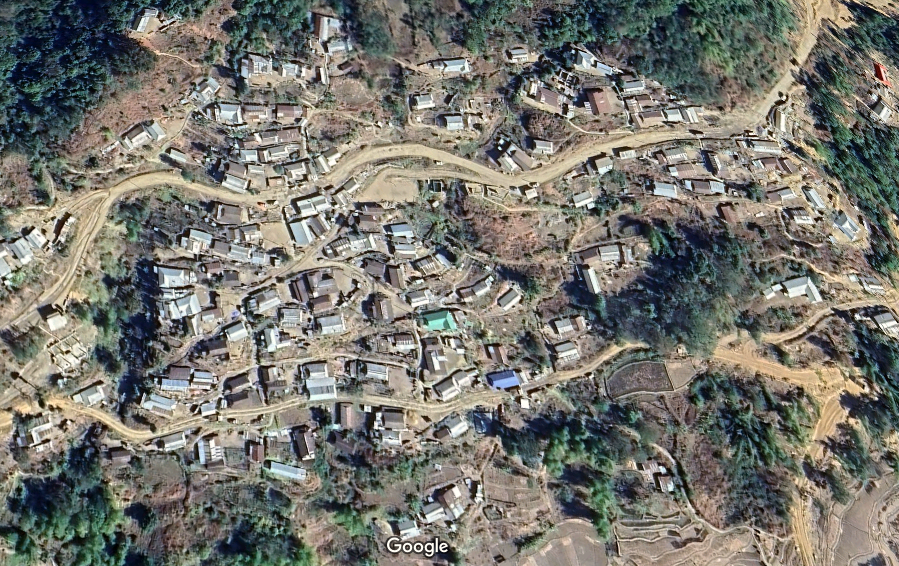
A satellite image of Tungjoy Rikhubumai in August, 2025

Tungjoy Rikhubumai is a Poumai village under the Paomata sub-division in the Senapati District of Manipur. It is an extended village of the larger Tungjoy village and the Rikhubumai villagers consist of a large clan called the Veimai. Some of the members of the Veimai clan also remain in the Tungjoy village. With the growth of increased population, three sub-clans have emerged as Paopaomai, Thetsiimai and Thekhomai. Thetsiimai and Thekhomai are often grouped together with their collective name Riithriinya.

The villagers predominantly follow Christianity faith within the two popular denominations; Roman Catholics and Baptist Church. Rikhubumai village do not have separate independent Churches but share with the Tungjoy village and remain closely bonded.
