= Tribal youth dormitory =

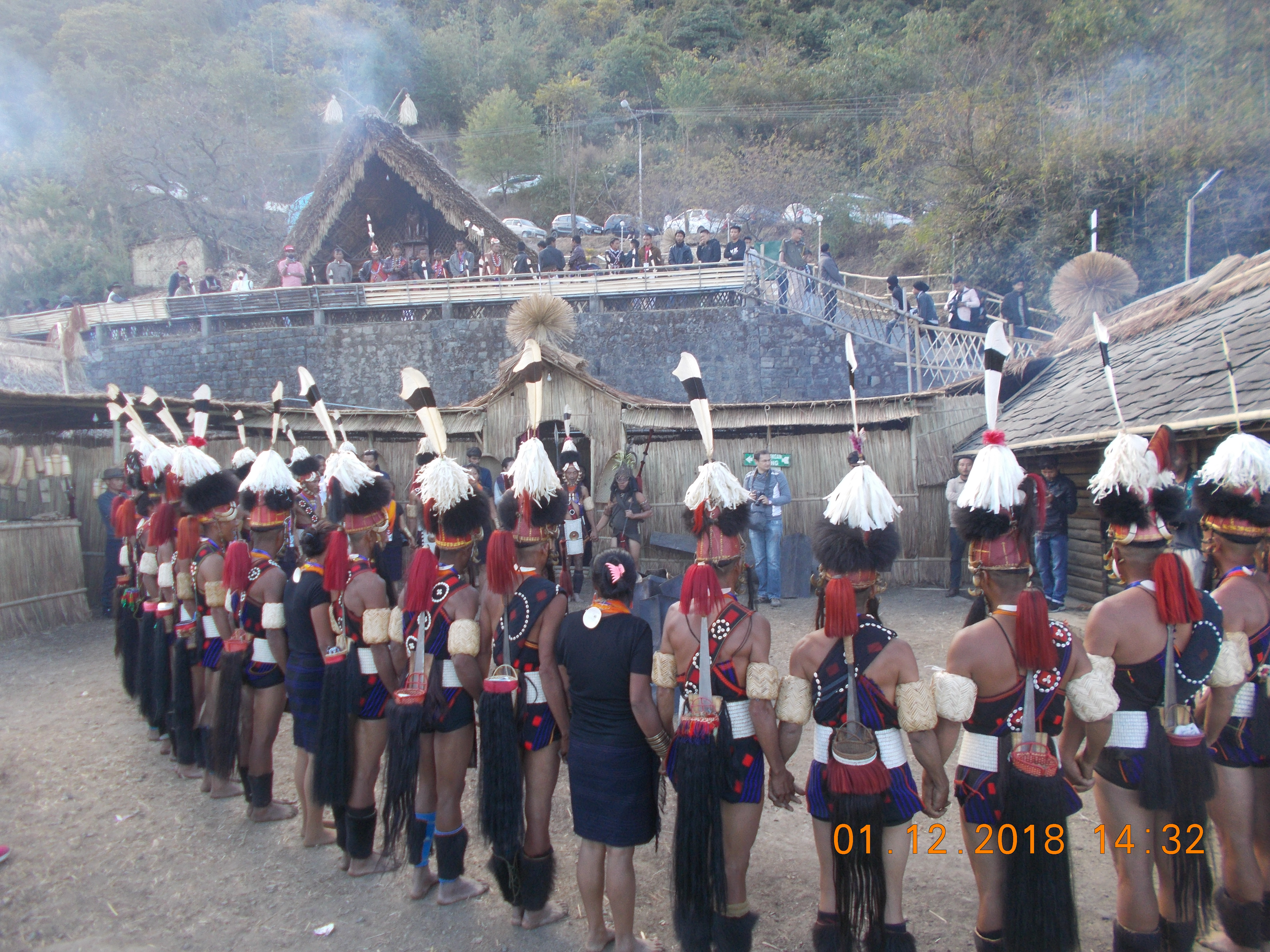
Khiamniungans dance outside their morung at the Hornbill Festival

Youth dormitories are a traditional institution among several tribal societies of the world including the various tribes of India, the tribes of South-East Asia, and the native Americans.

Among many tribes, the youth dormitory is a now declining or defunct institution. For example, among several tribes of North-East India, the traditional dormitories (called morung) became dysfunctional in the 20th century, with the advent of modern educational institutions and Christianity. However, among some tribes, such as the Nagas, it has continued to exist as a socio-cultural institution.

== Names ==
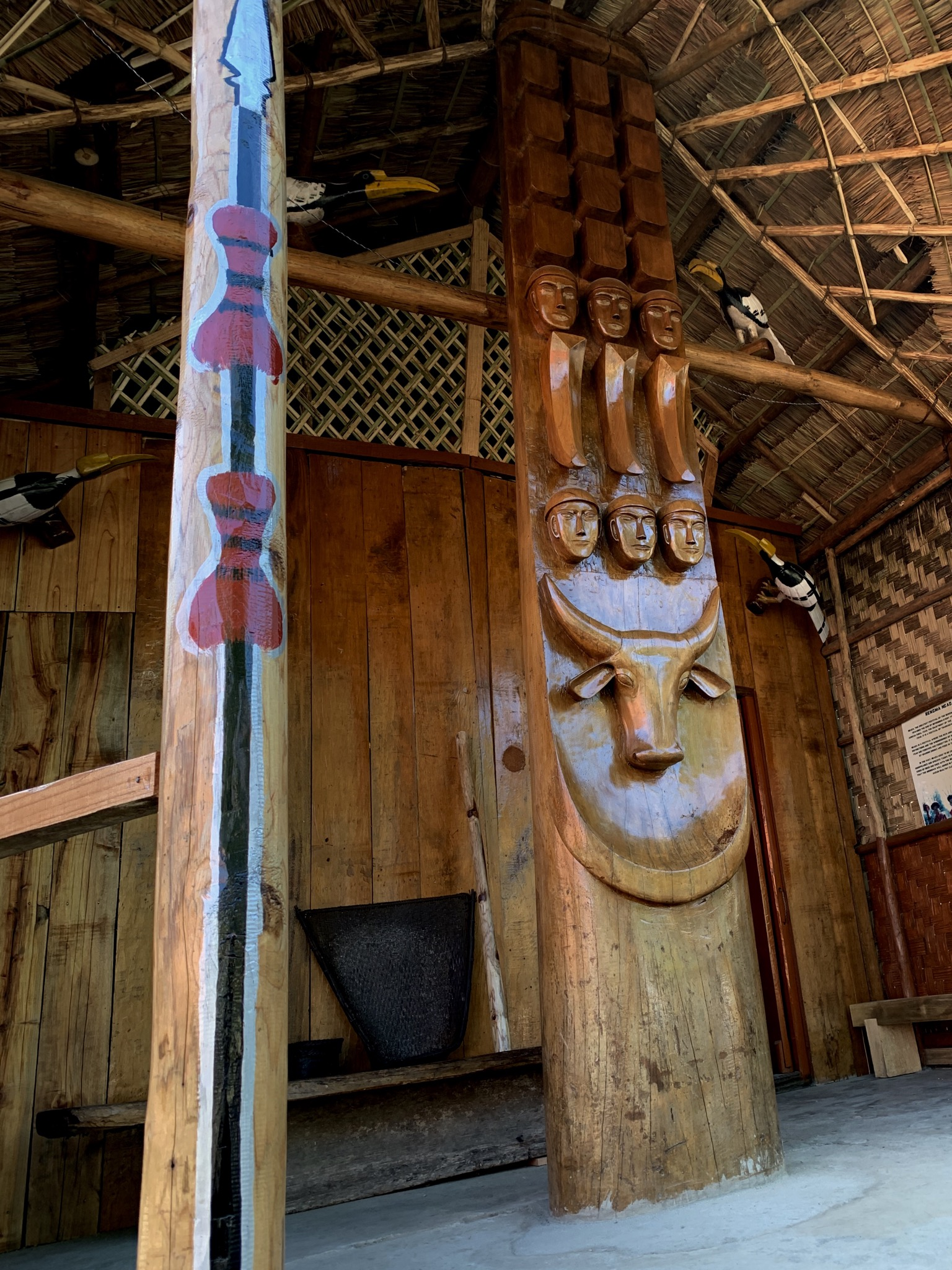
Entrance of a Rengma Naga morung at the Kisama Heritage Village

Different tribes have different names for their youth dormitories:

- Arichu or Areju among Aos; the Ao girls slept in a separate house called Tsuki, which was chaperoned by a widow.
- Bukumatala in Trobriand Islands
- Buonzawl among Hmars
- Calpule in Guatemala
- Champo among Lothas
- Chu or Chupang in the Yangpi village of Nagaland
- Dai in Palau
- Dekha Chang among Semas (only for males)
- Dhangarbasa or Dhangarbassa among Bhuyans
- Dhumkuria among Oraons, including Jonkh-erpa for boys and Pelo-erpa for girls
- Ghotul or Gotul among Gonds, common for both males and females
- Giti-O or Gitiora among Mundas such as Birhors and Hos; separate for boys and girls
- Hangseuki (boys) and Leoseuki (girls) among Zeme
- Ikhuichi (boys) and Illoichi (girls) among the Mao Nagas (Memis)
- Imieum in New Hebrides
- Khangchu / Khangchiu (for boys) and Luchu / Liuchiu / Kailiu (for girls) in Rongmei language
- Khangchiuky (for boys) and Liuchiuky (for girls) in Lianglad
- Kichuki among Angamis
- Kwod among the tribes of Torres Strait Islands
- Lochii among Maos
- Loho in Sulawesi
- Longshim among Tangkhuls, including Mayarlong for boys and Ngalalong for girls
- Louchizii Fii among Poumais
- Maro or Terang among Mikirs
- Morung (boys) and Yo (girls) among the Konyaks
- Moshup or Mosup among Adis / Abors
- Nedrong or Nodrong among Dimasa Kacharis
- Nokpanti among Garos
- Raliiki among Marams
- Rang-bang among Bhotiyass, common for both males and females
- Rensi, Azughu, or Awikhu among the Rengmas
- Roemah Kompani in Kai Islands
- Romaluli in Flores
- Sochem (boys) and Shemshimang (girls) among the Changs; the Changs also have another morung-like institution called haki, but it is not a bachelor's dormitory. It is used as a guard house, a council hall, a religious institution, a drum house, and a repository for war trophies.
- Ti in Marquesas Islands
- Zawlbuk among Kukis

In north-east India, morung is a common name for the traditional tribal youth clubs or bachelors' dormitories. It is an Ahom or Assamese language word.

== Functions ==
Traditionally, after attaining a certain age (as young as 4-5 years among the Oraons), the tribal youth would attend the dormitory. Generally, they ceased to be a member of the organization when they married. In some cases, as in Ghotul, widowed people were admitted to the dormitory. The dormitories' affairs are usually managed by senior members, including elected office-bearers.

The functions of the youth dormitories vary from tribe to tribe, and may include:

- Teaching conjugal duties
- Teaching social duties
- Teaching clan lore
- Impart training in tribal art, music and dance
- Providing workforce for the community efforts such as shifting cultivation, house-building, elder care, and festival organization
- A sleeping place for young tribals in villages that had very small homes without much privacy
- Defence of the village (for example, among the Dimasa Kacharis)

Among some tribes, the dormitories also served as a place for courtship among young men and women. These dormitories admitted both men and women. For example, among some Gond tribes (such as Asurs and Marias) and Khonds, boys and girls sleep in the same dormitory. These functions have changed with times; for example, according to a 1966 survey, the traditional Areju dormitory had largely disappeared from the Ao Naga village of Waromung. In its place, there were two Church-controlled gender-specific dormitories, whose main function was to ensure segregation of unmarried boys and girls. Some tribal dormitories traditionally accept only males, and some have separate dormitories for males and females. For example, among the Mundas, the boys and girls would sleep in separate dormitories at night; in the villages that did not have a dormitory for the girls, the girls would sleep in the house of old women.

Among some of the Naga tribes, such as the Angamis, the dormitory was an insignificant institution. Among others, it was an important institution and the nominees of the dormitory (morung) served on the village council.

The morung plays vital role in preparing younger generations for posts in the village council. The morung is the club, the public school, the military training centre, the hostel for boys and meeting place for village elders. It is as well the centre for the social, religious, and political activities.

— V. K. Anand, Nagaland in Transition

Among some tribes, the dormitories had additional special functions. For example, the Lothas used to keep their sacred stones in the dormitory. The Aos used to hang the heads of their headhunting victims and rewarded the headhunters at the dormitory during the Moatsu festival.

The activities of the dormitories varied from tribe to tribe. They included education, story-telling, singing, dancing, sex, festive celebrations, religious ceremonies, and socio-political activities. The dormitories may train the members in hunting-gathering, fishing, wood-cutting, arts and crafts, agriculture, and other jobs. Among some tribes, the members were expected to help in the village activities such as agriculture and house-building.

The dormitories were generally located near the village chief's house (as among the Oraons), in forest away from the village (as in Bastar district), in the centre of the village, or among the fields (as among the Konyaks). Typically, the dormitories were located in distinctive building structures, and were decorated with totemic emblems.

Some villages had multiple dormitories, such as for each section (khel) of the village among some Naga tribes. The Semas built miniature dormitories as a fertility rite.
