= Phuba Thapham =

Village in Manipur, India

Coordinates: 25.412°N 94.247°E

Phuba Thapham Khyoubuh
- Village
- Interactive map of Phuba Thapham
- Country: {India}
- State: Manipur
- District: Senapati
- Established: 12/02/1944

Languages
  - Official: Poula
- Time zone: UTC+5:30 (IST)
- PIN: 795105
- Vehicle registration: MN
- Website: manipur.gov.in

Phuba Thapham (Khyoubuh) is a village that branched out from Phuba Khuman in around 1940s. It is situated in Senapati District, Manipur, India. Christianity is the religion of the inhabitants of Phuba Thapham. Rice is the staple food of the villagers. Farming is the chief occupation. According to the last census the population of Phuba Thapham is 4354. The inhabitants of the village belong to Poumai Naga tribe.

== Etymology ==
The village, Phuba Thapham [Khyoubuh], means the place of the moon. There was a stone found somewhere in the village in the shape of a moon that used to shine at night and villagers believed it as a moon. Forefather believed that it is the place where the moon rises and so the name of the village was named as Khyoubuh. The other name, Phuba Thapham, was given by Meiteis during the enrollment and census survey in the area.

== Economy ==
Paddy, maize, potato, cabbage, pumpkins and cereals are the main economic crops of the land. Rice is the staple food. Cattle, buffalo, and pig are the main animals reared in the village. Poultry and fishery are common as well. The land has a dense forest and rich in cultivating numerous wild fruits. It has a huge varieties of herbs in the land which remains unexplored.
