= Shajouba =

Village in Manipur

Shajouba Charanghomei
- Village
- Location of Shajouba Shajouba (India) Shajouba (Asia) Shajouba (Earth)
- Coordinates: 25.476162°N 94.147821°E
- Country: India
- Region: Northeast India
- State: Manipur
- District: Senapati District

Government
  - Type: Village Council
  - Body: Shajouba Village Council

Population (2011)
  - Total: 7,456
  - Dialect: Emela
- Time zone: UTC+5:30 (IST)
- PIN: 795104
- Sex ratio: 938 females per 1000 males ♂/♀
- Climate: Temperate (Köppen)

Shajouba, known natively as Charanghomei, is a Mao Naga village in the Senapati District of the Indian state of Manipur. It is the biggest Mao Naga village. The village is located 40 km south of Kohima, the capital of Nagaland and 101 km north of Imphal, the capital of Manipur.

== Demographics ==
Shajouba is located in Tadubi Block of Senapati District, Manipur with total 1430 families residing. It has a population of 7456 of which 3848 are males while 3608 are females as per Population Census 2011.

In Shajouba the Average Sex Ratio is 938 which is lower than Manipur state average of 985. Child Sex Ratio for Shajouba as per census is 816, higher than Nagaland average of 939.
