= Senapati, Manipur =

Senapati Tahamzam
- Town
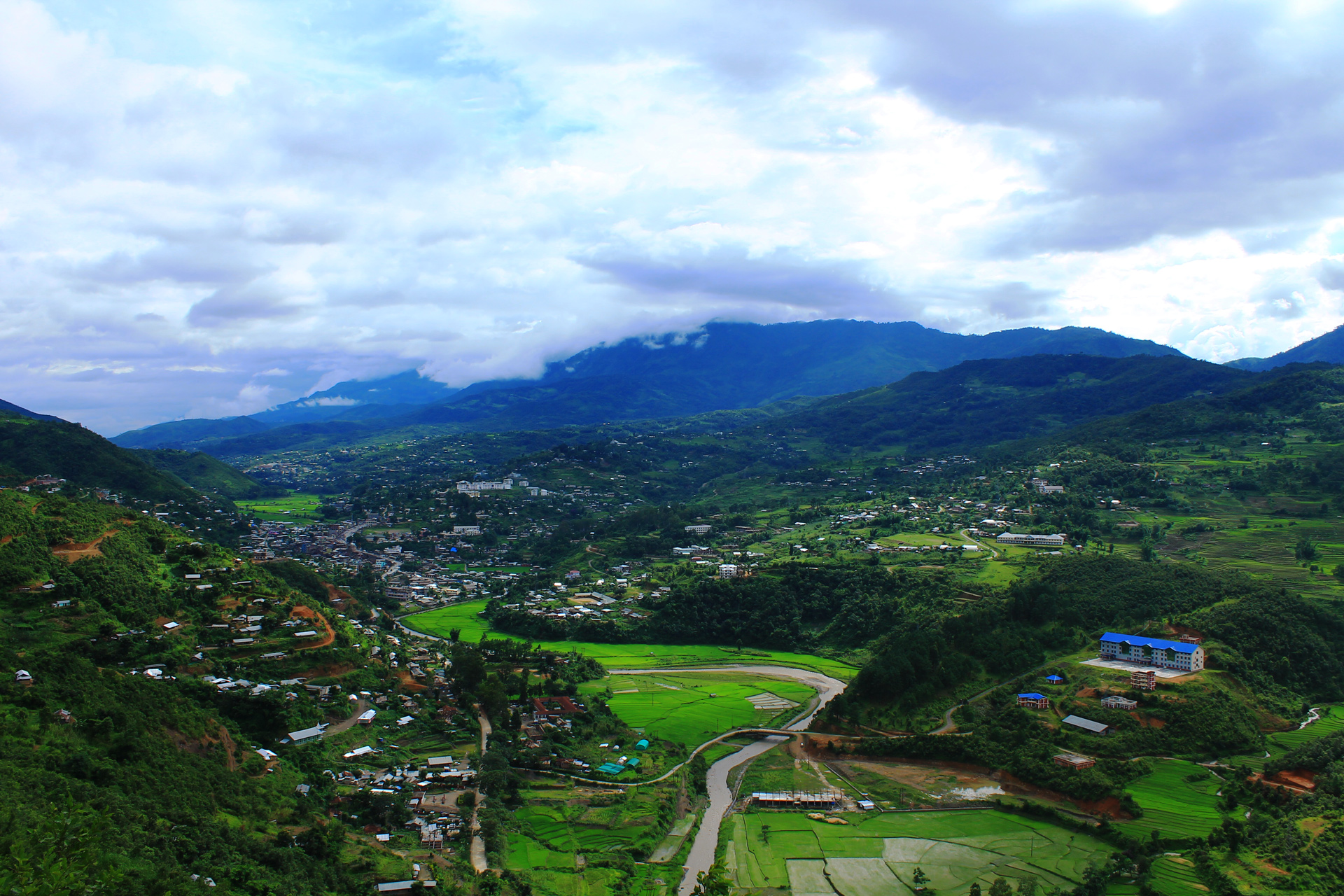
- Tahamzam, Senapati
- Interactive map of Senapati
- Location in Manipur, India Senapati (India)
- Coordinates: 25.2712°N 94.0274°E
- Country: India
- Region: Northeast India
- State: Manipur
- District: Senapati District

Area
  - Total: 20 km^{2} (7.7 sq mi)
- Elevation: 1,500 m (4,900 ft)

Language(s)
  - Official: Meitei (officially called Manipuri) (Note: Meitei language (officially known as Manipuri language) is the official language of Manipur. Other regional languages of different places in Manipur may either be predominantly spoken or not in their respective places but "Meitei" is always officially used.)
  - Regional: Maram; Poumai; Mao; Thangal; Zeme
- Time zone: UTC+5:30 (IST)
- PIN: 795106
- Telephone code: 3871
- Vehicle registration: MN-08

Senapati (Meitei pronunciation:/se.na.pə.ti/), known locally as Tahamzam, is the district headquarters of Senapati district in the Indian state of Manipur.

== Etymology ==
Senapati is named after Tikendrajit Singh, a member of the royal family of Manipur. He was also the Senapati or "Commander-in-Chief of the Royal Army". During British invasion in the state, Tikendrajit Singh fought bravely but was later captured and publicly hanged. Senapati is named after him, for fighting against the invaders.

The name Tahamzam originates from the Maram Naga dialect which literally means "Hill of Butterflies".

== Media ==
The Major Media in Senapati are:

=== Newspapers ===
- Hills Hornbill Express
- Times of Senapati
- The Herald Today

== See also ==
- List of populated places in Senapati district
