= Onaeme Hill =

Oinam Onaeme ka
- Village
- Interactive map of Oinam
- Coordinates: 25.350976°N 94.197161°E
- Country: India
- State: Manipur
- District: Senapati

Population
  - Total: 4,571 (2,014)
- Demonym: Onaeme

Languages
  - Official: Poula, Oneame layh, English
- Time zone: UTC+5:30 (IST)
- PIN: 795 007
- Vehicle registration: MN 08

Onaeme Hill, also called Oinam, is a Poumai Naga village situated about 40 km from the Senapati district headquarters.

== History ==
The village is known for its folk art of pouli pottery, which is traditionally made by women. Historically, the village served as an economic hub due to its pottery industry, and it sold pottery to other nearby villages. The importance of the pottery industry lessened as industrialization made metal utensils more commonly available.

On 9 July 1987, an Assam Rifles outpost at Onaeme Hill was attacked by the National Socialist Council of Nagaland. A counter-mission called Operation Bluebird was launched ostensibly to capture the attackers and retrieve the weapons that they had stolen. However, the Assam Rifles instead attacked surrounding villages and killed many innocent civilians.

According to the Census of India 2011, Onaeme Village has a literacy rate of 90.67%.
