= Tagaramphung =

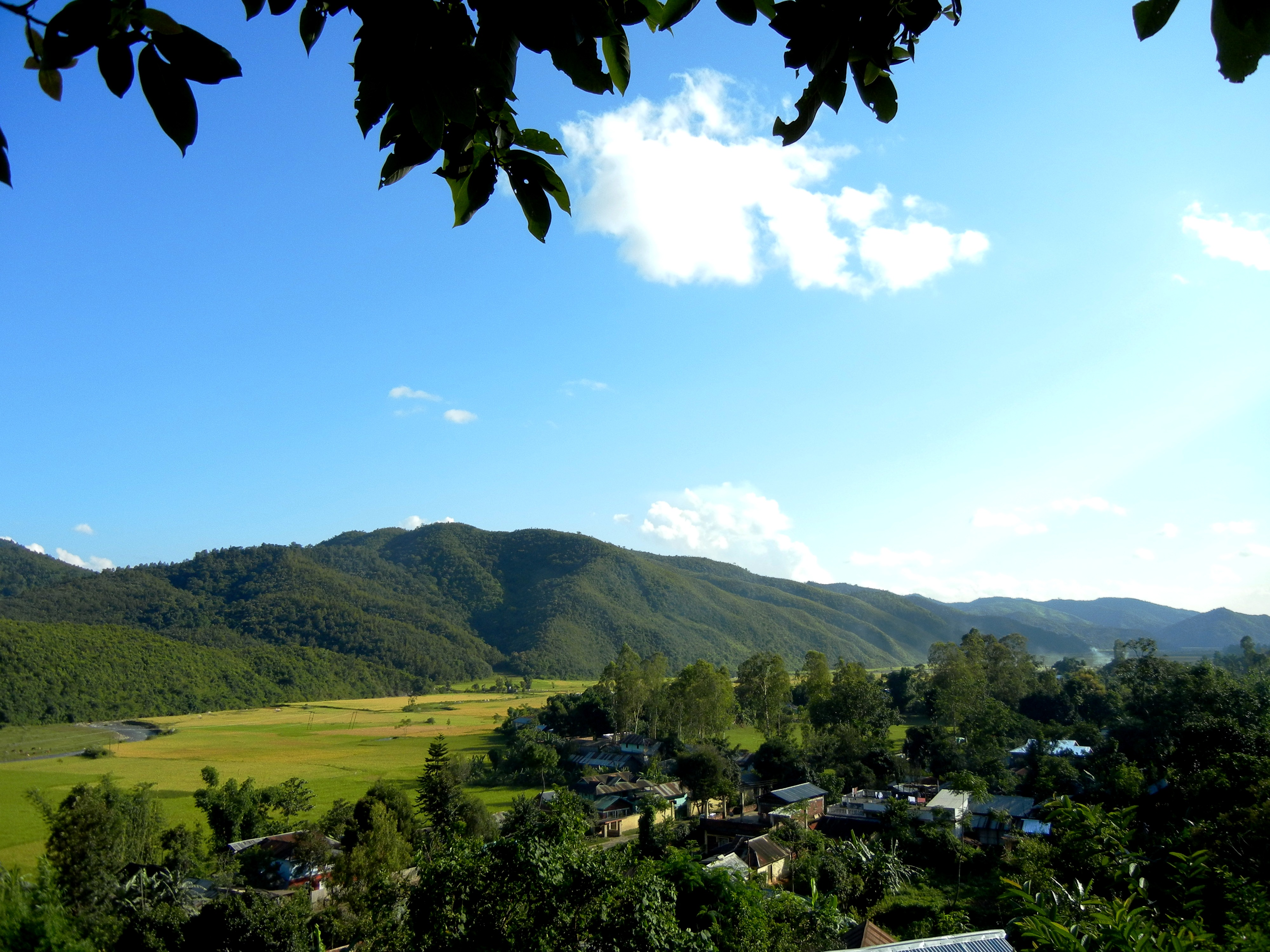
View of Tagaramphung from the village cemetery

Tagaramphung is a small village of the Thangals, a sub tribe of the Naga people, situated in the northern part of Manipur. The village was formerly known as Yaikongpao. It is a part of Kangpokpi tehsil in Senapati District of Manipur state, India, and is 22 kilometres (14 mi) south of the district headquarters at Senapati and 42 kilometres (26 mi) from the state capital at Imphal.
