= Mao Naga =

Mao Naga may refer to:

- Mao Naga people, or Mao people, a Tibeto-Burman ethnic group of India
- Mao Naga language, or Sopvoma language, a Sino-Tibetan language of India
