= Maram Naga =

Maram Naga may refer to:

- Maram Naga people, or Maram people, a Tibeto-Burmese Naga ethnic group of India
- Maram Naga language, or Maram language, a Sino-Tibetan language spoken in India
