= Phaibung =

Village in Senapati district, Manipur, India

- Village
- Location in Manipur Phaibung (India)
- Coordinates: 25°25′37″N 94°20′18″E
- Country: India
- State: Manipur
- District: Senapati district

Population (2011)
  - Total: 4,664 (2,011)
- Time zone: UTC+5:30 (IST)
- PIN: 795104
- Vehicle registration: MN

Phaibung is a village in the Purul subdivision of Senapati district of Manipur, India. It consists of 2 settlements namely Phaibung Khullen and Lower Phaibung which are closely connected.

== Demographics ==
According to the 2011 Census:

- Phaibung Khullen: Population 4,664 (2,363 m; 2,301 f), sex ratio 974 ♀/1,000 ♂, literacy 37.3%.
- Lower Phaibung: Population 990 (527 m; 463 f), sex ratio 879, literacy 49.1%.

In both settlements, the population of Scheduled Tribe is more than 99 percent.

== Geography ==
Phaibung is situated at about 27 km east of the town of Senapati and about 79 km north of Imphal. Purul block has some neighbouring villages such as Shirong (Shirong Shofii), Oklong and Purul Atongba.

== Economy ==
The major occupation is agriculture: the majority of people are cultivators and cultivate rice, maize, and pulses. In Lower Phaibung, 99.66% out of the working population are employed with primary farm work.

== Administration ==
Along with its Gram Panchayat of local government, the village is within Chillivai Phaibung TD Block of Senapati district. It is a part of Purul Assembly Constituency of Manipur Legislative Assembly and is included in the Outer Manipur Lok Sabha Constituency.

== Language and culture ==
The official language of the region used by local residents of Phaibung is Meitei, and this is denoted because Meitei is considered as a widely used lingua franca in the region of Senapati district. Most of them are part of the Naga ethnic communities, and among them are the Tangkhul people. Though they speak their own Tangkhulic, the tendency of language use in inter-community communication seems to have taken place in Meitei.

== Infrastructure and transport ==
- PIN code: 795104.
- Nearest urban centres: Senapati (27 km west) and Imphal (about 79 km south).
- No railway station within 10 km; nearest is Jiribam.
- Served by: Bir Tikendrajit International Airport, Imphal (about 80 km).
- Accessible by: the Senapati-Phaibung rural road connecting to the east of the National Highway 2. Continued developing of the 128 km long road has encountered bottlenecks; in July 2024 The Sangai Express published the news about roads conditions in the area

== See also ==
- Senapati district
- Purul
- Tangkhul Naga (disambiguation)
