= Khamsom =

Khamsom Kisumai
- Village
- Khamsom
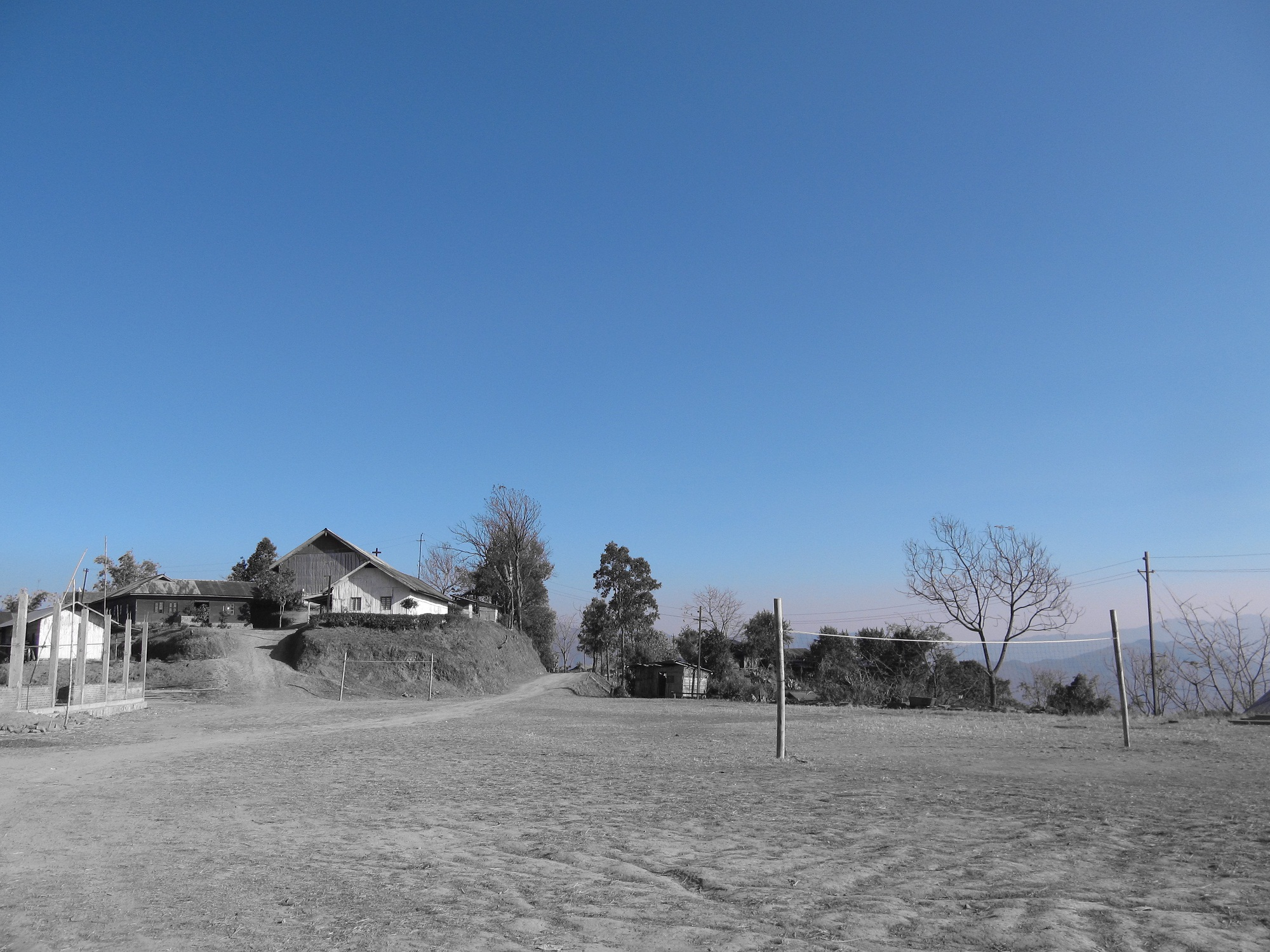
- View of Khamsom village

- Location in Manipur Khamsom (India)
- Coordinates: 25°18′33″N 94°15′27″E
- Country: India
- State: Manipur
- District: Senapati
- Established: 18th century
- Founder: Raomai & Lanamai Paoh

Government
  - Body: Village Authority

Languages
  - Official: Poula
- Time zone: UTC+5:30 (IST)
- PIN: 795106
- Vehicle registration: MN

Khamsom is a village in Senapati district bordering Ukhrul District, Manipur, India. The predominant inhabitants belong to Poumai Naga tribe.
