= Purul =

Purul (Hiimai) Hiimai Phii
- Village
- Interactive map of Purul (Hiimai)
- Country: India
- State: Manipur
- District: Senapati
- Elevation: 1,867 m (6,125 ft)

Population (2011)
  - Total: 11,211

Languages
  - Official: Poula
- Time zone: UTC+5:30 (IST)
- PIN: 795015
- Vehicle registration: MN
- Website: manipur.gov.in

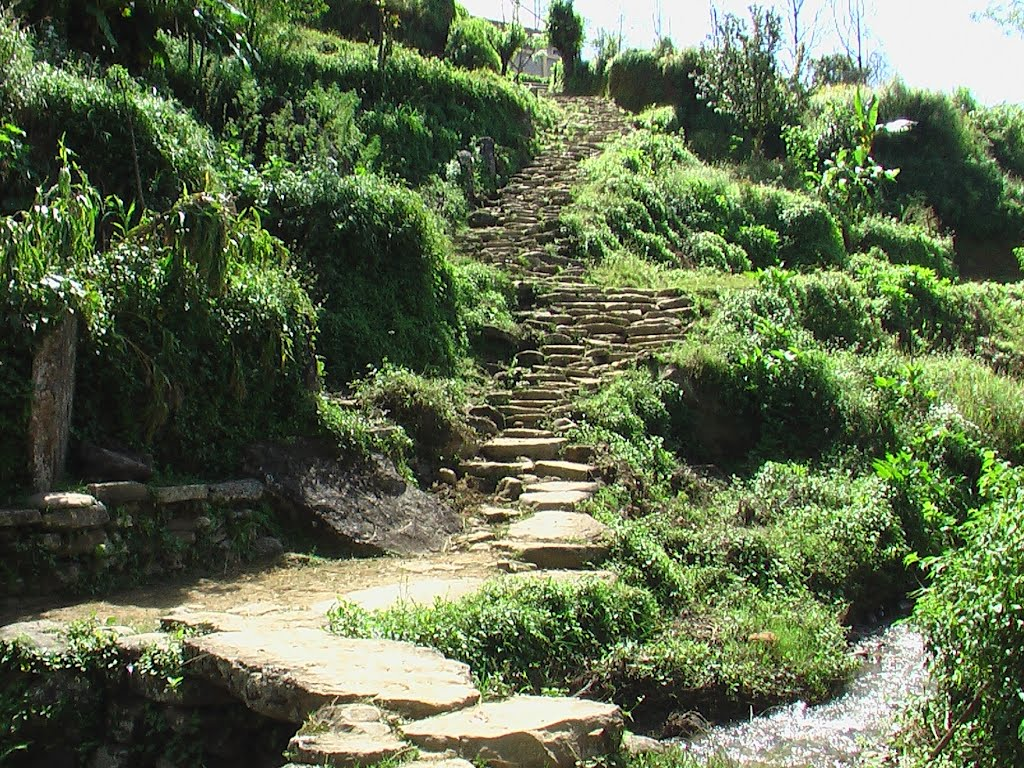
Purul Reiki Boulder Steps

Purul is a village in Senapati District, Manipur, India. Whereas Purul is the name given by Government for the purpose of administration, Hiimai Phii is the name given by its own inhabitants. Hiimai Phii is its ancestral name. 'Hiimai' refers to its people and 'Phii' to a place/land, meaning land of Hiimai. All the inhabitants belong to Poumai Naga tribe. The village consists of two contiguous habitations viz Purul Akutpa (Hiimai Khelomai) & Purul Atongba (Hiimai Dunamai). As per the latest census of India in 2011, 99.4% of the people follow Christianity and the rest follow naturism. And literacy rate is 74%. Purul is bordered by Phuba (North), Shirong and Khongdei Khuman (East), Oinam Hill(West) and Koide (South). At the village level, each of Purul Akutpa and Purul Atongba is administered by a selected person known as Village Chairman assisted by Secretary and other persons. These administrators are collectively known as Village Authority, similar to Panchayat/Sarpanch. At Zila level, 27 villages including Purul is administered by a Sub-divisional Officer (SDO)/Teshildar, whose office is located at the village. Among the 27 villages, Purul Akutpa is most populous with 6168 persons. The SDO works under the District Magistrate (DM/DC), Senapati. One elected person represent Purul in the Autonomous District Council (ADC), Senapati. Purul along with Oinam Hill, Phuba, Koide, Karong and other areas are represented at Manipur State level by one Member of Legislative Assembly (MLA). Name of the constituency is 47, Karong Legislative Assembly Constituency. It is the 47th of total 60 legislative constituencies of the Manipur state. Purul is 20 km from the nearest town i.e. Maram, which is located on the highway, NH-2. It is 45 km from District Headquarters, 112 km from the nearest airport (Imphal International Airport), 140 km from the nearest railway station (Dimapur Railway Station). Medical practitioner/physicians and other medical personnels are stationed at the Nearest Primary Health Centre (PHC), Oinam Hill. The PHC is 10 km from Purul. The village has one government higher secondary school, one private secondary school and five government primary schools.
