= Rengma Naga =

Rengma
Total population
- 85,000 (2011 census)

Regions with significant populations

Languages
- Northern Rengma, Western Rengma and Southern Rengma

Religion
- Christianity, Animism

Related ethnic groups
- Tenyimi (Angami Naga · Chakhesang Naga · Mao Naga · Poumai Naga · Maram Naga · Zeme Naga)

The Rengma Naga are a Naga ethnic group inhabiting the Northeast Indian states of Nagaland and Assam. According to the 2011 Census of India, the population of Rengmas in Nagaland stands at 62,951 and the population of Rengmas in Assam is around 22,000. Tseminyü District is the headquarters of the Rengmas in Nagaland and the headquarters of the Rengmas in Assam is located at Phentsero/Karenga Village.

== History ==
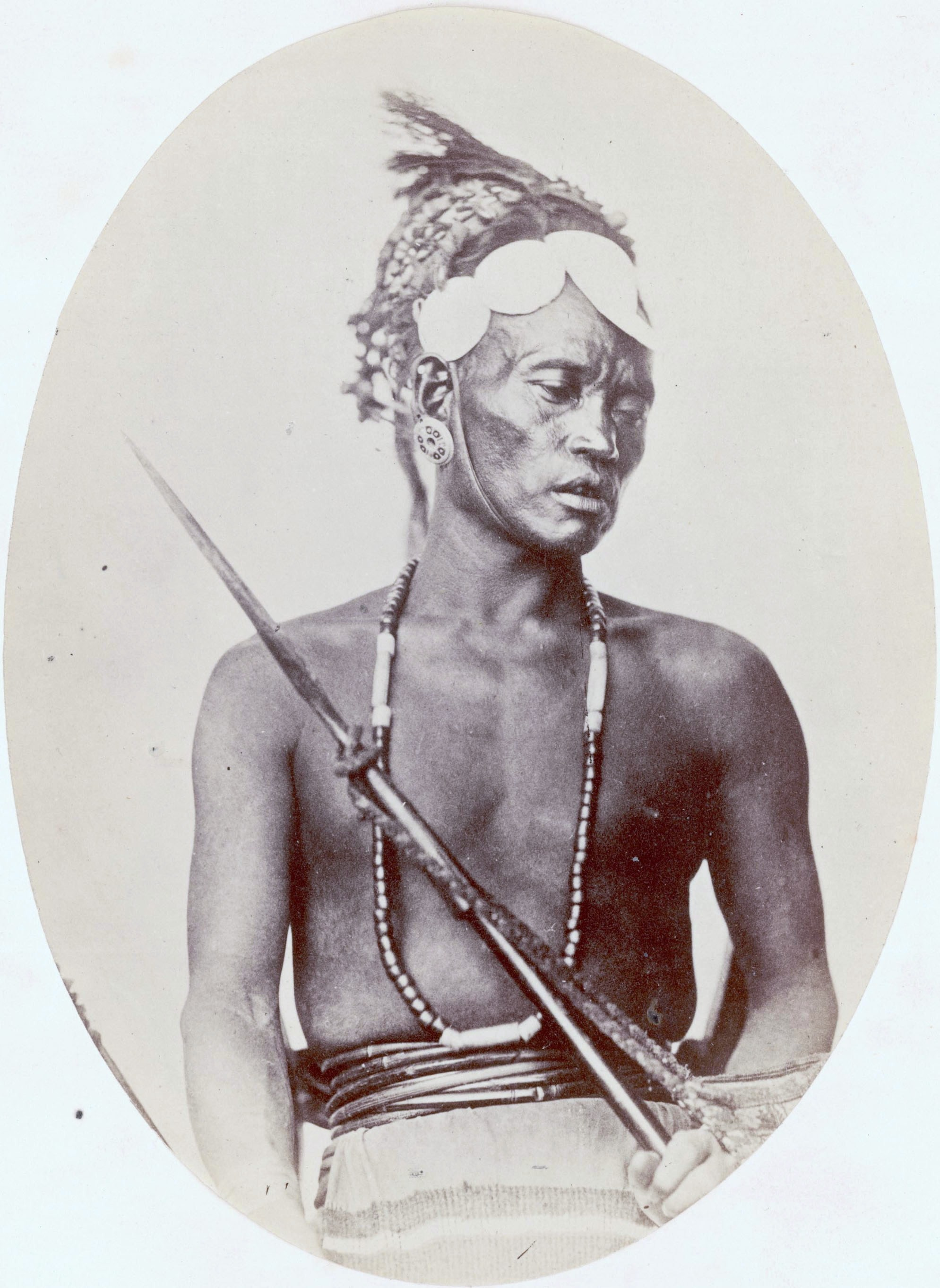
A Rengma Naga man, c. 1868

According to the local traditions, the Rengmas and the Lothas (or Lhotas) were once part of a single ethnic group. There are also oral records of a mighty struggle between the combined Rengma villages and the Lotha village of Phiro. There are records of the Rengmas' conflict with the Angami Nagas.

Slavery used to be a practice among the Rengmas, and the slaves were known by the names menugetenyu and itsakesa. By the time the British arrived in the Naga region, slavery was a declining practice, and no Rengma appears to have been a slave during this time.

In Assam, the Rengma people are found in the Karbi-Anglong, the then Mikir Hills. The Rengmas migrated to the then Mikir Hills in the early part of the 1800s. The migration of the Rengmas can be traced in the books written by JP Mills, ICS on the following:

In the book 'Travels in Assam' written by John Butler, specifically mentioned on page number 126 that beyond the Kuleanee river, the Rengmah (sic) boundary commences and terminates with the Dhunseeree (sic) river, separating Now-Gong from the Seebsaghur (sic) district.

John Butler writes in 'Traves in Assam' on page number 121 that in 1839, Mr. Grange, Sub-Assistant Commissioner, seems to have been the first European officer who met the Rengma Naga in the vicinity of Mohung Dehooa, on his way to the Angami Hills. Butler opines that no revenue settlement was ever made or written agreement taken from them to pay the revenue, till February 1847. Mr. Sub-Assistant was deputed in December 1847 to enter the Rengma hills from Golaghat; but after visiting many villages, he found the country so heavy and impassable from the dense wet jungles and was forced to return to the plains at Kageerunga (sic). He again met the Rengma Naga and the first revenue settlement with the Rengma Naga villages, discovered thirty-two in number and was successfully paid.

"The Rengma Nagas" written by JP Mills, MA, Indian Civil Service, Honorary Director of Ethnography Assam in 1936 in Introductory part in page 2 states, "About a hundred years ago or more a body of the western Rengmas migrated north-west to the Mikir Hills, where they are still living." (ISBN 978-0404158705)

The book "The Lhota Nagas" written by JP Mills, ICS in 1922 in page xiv of the Introduction states, "Indeed it is now no longer quite clear whether this chief was a Lhota our a Rengma, and whether he protected against the pursuing Angamis the rearguard of the Lhotas crossing the Dayang northwards, or that of the Rengmas migrating westwards to the Mikir Hills....."

Page xix of the same book states, "The Rengmas thus migrated from the Kezami-Angami country, throwing out the Naked Rengmas eastwards to Melomi, and ultimately sending the bigger portion of the tribe westwards to the Mikir Hills." (ISBN 978-8120617308)

The Rengmas claim that they are native or aborigines of Karbi-Anglong. Karbi oral history claims that they immigrated from the Yunnan region of China in ancient times. The Rengmas have come under pressure from militant factions, a hidden policy adopted by people between various ethnic groups interest and unity, and have retaliated by forming their own counter-militancy groupings, leading to ethnic killings and polarization in Karbi-Anglong, and the plight of both Karbis and Rengmas to relief camps. Parallel to the Rengmas, the Kukis, who have an anti-Naga tendency in the last few decades, also have militant groups active in Karbi-Anglong fighting for the rights of their ethnic group.

== Subgroups ==
The Rengma Nagas are divided into two groups: the Eastern Rengmas and the Western Rengmas.

== Economy ==
The Rengmas are experts in terrace cultivation.

== Culture ==
=== Traditional clothing ===
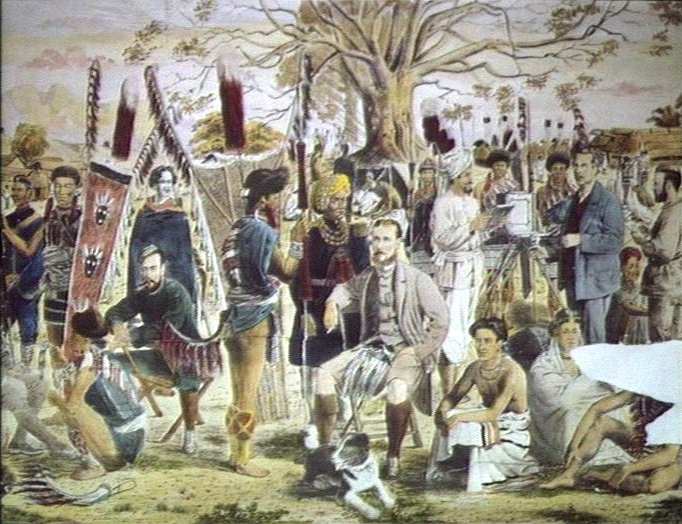
Captain Butler and assembled Nagas; seated left to right: Lt. Ridgeway, Capt. Butler, Angami Naga interpreter Sezele of Chephama, Mikir coolie. Standing left to right: Angami Naga, Inspector of Police, Angami Naga Dotsole of Chedema, Angami Naga, Rengma Naga, Commander in Chief Manipur Army, (sacred tree with skulls), ?, 2 Rengma Nagas, Dr Brown - Political Agent, Manipur

The traditional Rengma clothing consists of various types of clothes, which are indicative of the status and position of the weavers. A man who has not been able to offer a great feast, or has never killed an enemy may wear an ordinary type of cloth called Rhikho. Rhikho is a white cloth with four narrow black bands. The number of black bands varies with the age of the wearer. Moyet tsu is another ordinary type of cloth, worn by the young men. It is a dark blue cloth with a very broad median band, and embroidered with a thin zigzag pattern in red at the edges. Alungtsu is a cloth for well-to-do men who have not yet offered a great feast. Teri Phiketsu is a shawl, which requires the wearer to perform the head hunting ceremony.

Rengmas make yellow dye from the flowers of a tree, and also practice painting on clothes.

=== Ngada festival ===
The harvest festival of the Rengmas is called Ngada. It is an eight-day Ngada festival that marks the end of the agricultural season. Ngadah is celebrated just after the harvest, towards the end of November. The village high priest (Phesengu) announces the date of commencement of the festival.

The schedule of the festival is as follows:

Day	Event
1	Preparation of rice-beer
2	Collection of banana leaves from the forest.
3	Women visit the graves of their deceased relatives and place rice-beer wrapped in banana leaves on the graves. The Nagas believe that the souls of the deceased visit their relatives during Ngadah, and rice beer is a symbolic offering to the souls. The rice-beer is then tasted by the eldest member of the household, followed by others.
4	Early in the morning, the male members gather at their respective morungs or dormitories (known as Rensi), early in the morning. They come with their own rice beer and meat, and have a meal. The women do not take part in the morung feast. At noon, all the male members go around the village with their ceremonial and warrior fineries. They are followed by women, who carry rice-beer in mugs and bitter gourd containers, to offer them drinks.
5	The male members visit all the houses in a procession, singing songs related to Ngadah. Each visited house offers something as a token of their appreciation.
6	People visit houses of other villagers, and eat and drink.
7	People collect firewood, banana leaves and vegetables for the feast from the forest.
8	A grand feast is arranged, and the whole village feasts on the collection from the fifth day. According to the traditional Rengma belief, the souls of those who died in the previous year leave the village after the grand feast and go to the land of the dead. The end of the festival is marked with three rites: an agreement with the fire in order to avoid fire accidents, an agreement with rats to avoid destruction of crops or household goods, and a rite to expel the evil spirits.

During Ngadah, the Rengmas also perform a folk dance, with traditional warrior attire.

=== Other ethnic customs ===
The Rengma people bury their dead and place the spear and the shield of the deceased in the grave. The funeral ceremonies end with lamentations and feasting.
