= Paomata Centre =

Village in Senapati district, Manipur, India

- Village
- Location in Manipur, India Paomata Centre (India)
- Coordinates: 25.4422°N 94.2771°E
- Country: India
- State: Manipur
- District: Senapati district
- Subdivision: Paomata

Population (2011)
  - Total: 1,344
- Time zone: UTC+5:30 (IST)
- Postal code: 795104
- Vehicle registration: MN

Paomata Centre is a village in the Paomata subdivision of Senapati district, Manipur, India. It comes under the Paomata Community Development Block.

There are 279 families residing in the village.

== Postal and demographics ==
- PIN code: 795104.

As per the 2011 census;

- Total population: 1344 (696 males and 648 females).
- Child population: 120.
- Sex ratio: 931 females per 1000 males.
- Child sex ratio: 846 females per 1000 males.
- Literacy rate: 31.54%

== Education ==
The Paomata High School (H/S) is a co-educational school that was established in 1957 at Paomata Centre. The school consists of only Grade III to Grade X and does not have any pre-primary section. In this school, English is the medium of instructions.

The school is accessible by road in all weather conditions, and its academic session starts in the April month.

There are also other schools in Paomata and its neighbouring villages.

== Healthcare ==
There is a primary health centre in Paomata. There are also health centres, hospitals, etc in other neighbouring villages.

== See also ==
- Senapati district
- List of populated places in Senapati district
