= Tseminyü =

Tseminyu
- Town
- Location in Nagaland, India Tseminyu (India)
- Coordinates: 25.92469°N 94.21488°E
- Country: India
- State: Nagaland
- District: Tseminyü District
- Time zone: UTC+5:30 (IST)
- PIN: 797109

Tseminyu is the headquarters of the Tseminyu District of Indian state of Nagaland.
