= Tangkhul Naga =

Tangkhul Naga may refer to:

- Tangkhul Naga people, a people of Manipur, India
- Tangkhul–Maring languages, a group of Sino-Tibetan languages of northeastern India
  - Tangkhulic languages, a subgroup of the above language family
    - Tangkhul Naga language, the Sino-Tibetan language of the above people
    - Tangkhul Naga language (Burma) or Somra, a Sino-Tibetan language of Burma
- Tangkhul Hundung, village in Manipur, India
