= Tseminyü district =

- District of Nagaland
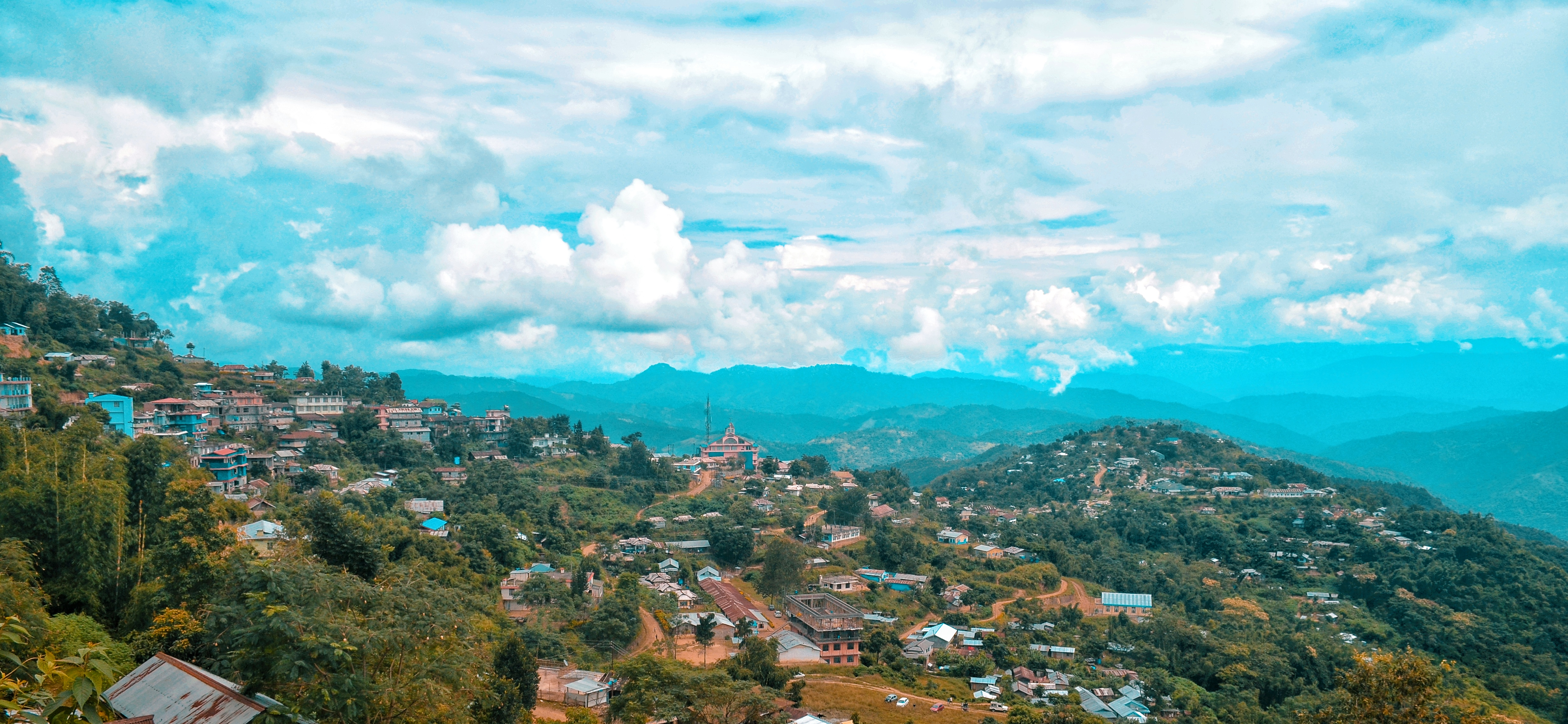
- Nickname: Historical District
- Tseminyü District in Nagaland
- Coordinates: 25°56′N 94°10′E
- Country: India
- State: Nagaland
- Headquarters: Tseminyü

Government
  - Lok Sabha Constituency: Nagaland
  - Deputy Commissioner: Zasekuolie Chüsi (IAS)
  - Assembly constituencies: 1 constituencies

Area
  - Total: 256 km^{2} (99 sq mi)

Population (2011)
  - Total: 63,269
  - Density: 247/km^{2} (640/sq mi)
- Time zone: UTC+05:30 (IST)
- Major highways: NH 2
- Website: https://tseminyu.nic.in/

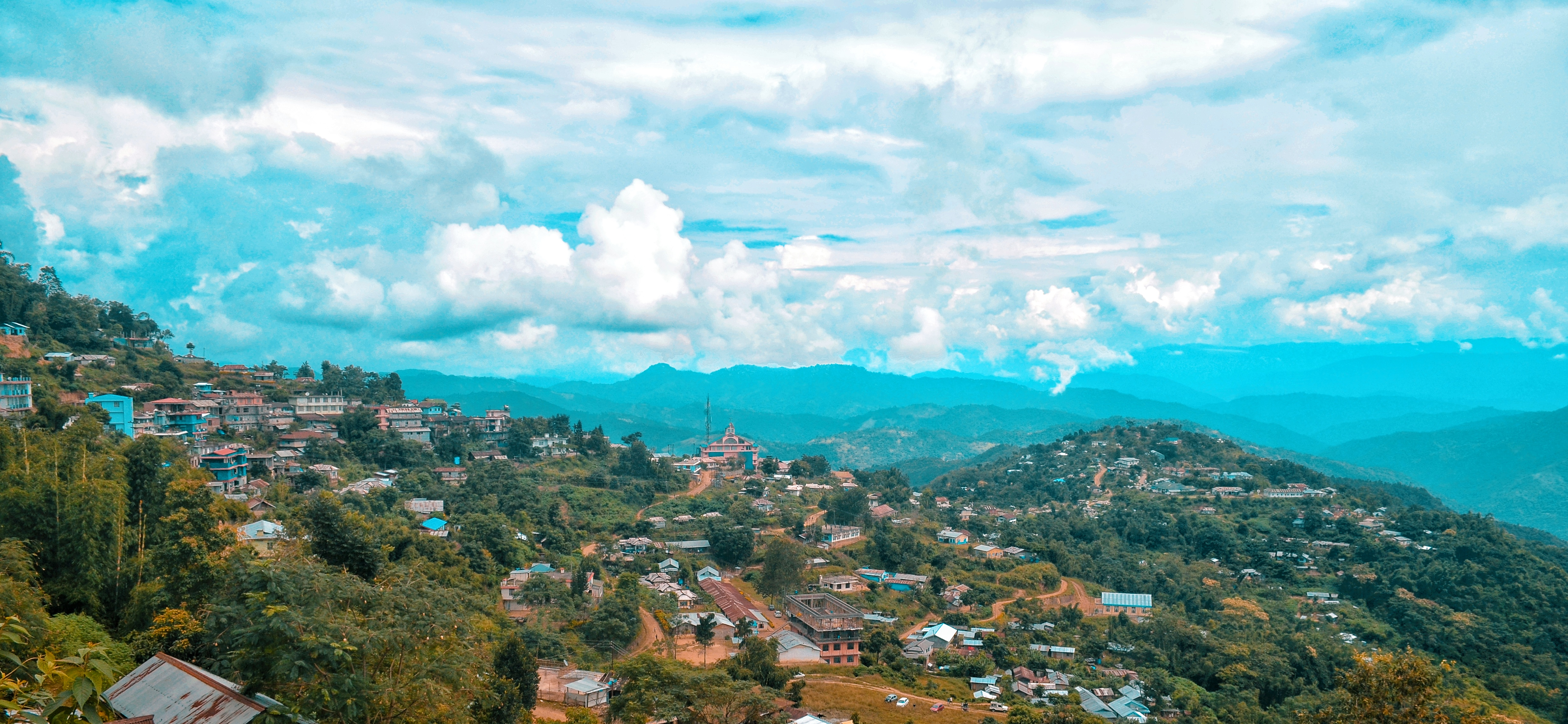
Panoramic view of Tseminyü District.

Tseminyü district is located in the Indian state of Nagaland. It was created on December 18, 2021, as the 13th district of Nagaland. The district headquarters is located in the town of Tseminyü. It is home to the Rengma Nagas, with a population of 63,269 (2011) and an area of 256 square kilometres.

== History ==
Tseminyü District was created on December 18, 2021 as the 13th district of Nagaland. The new district has the same boundaries as the former Tseminyü sub-division of Kohima District.

== Geography ==
Tseminyü District covers an area of 256 km. The climate is sub-tropical with a monsoon season.

== Administration ==
The district covers two taluks (administrative circles), which are Tseminyü and Tsogin.

Tseminyü District contains two rural development blocks, which are Tseminyü and Nsunyu.

== Demographics ==
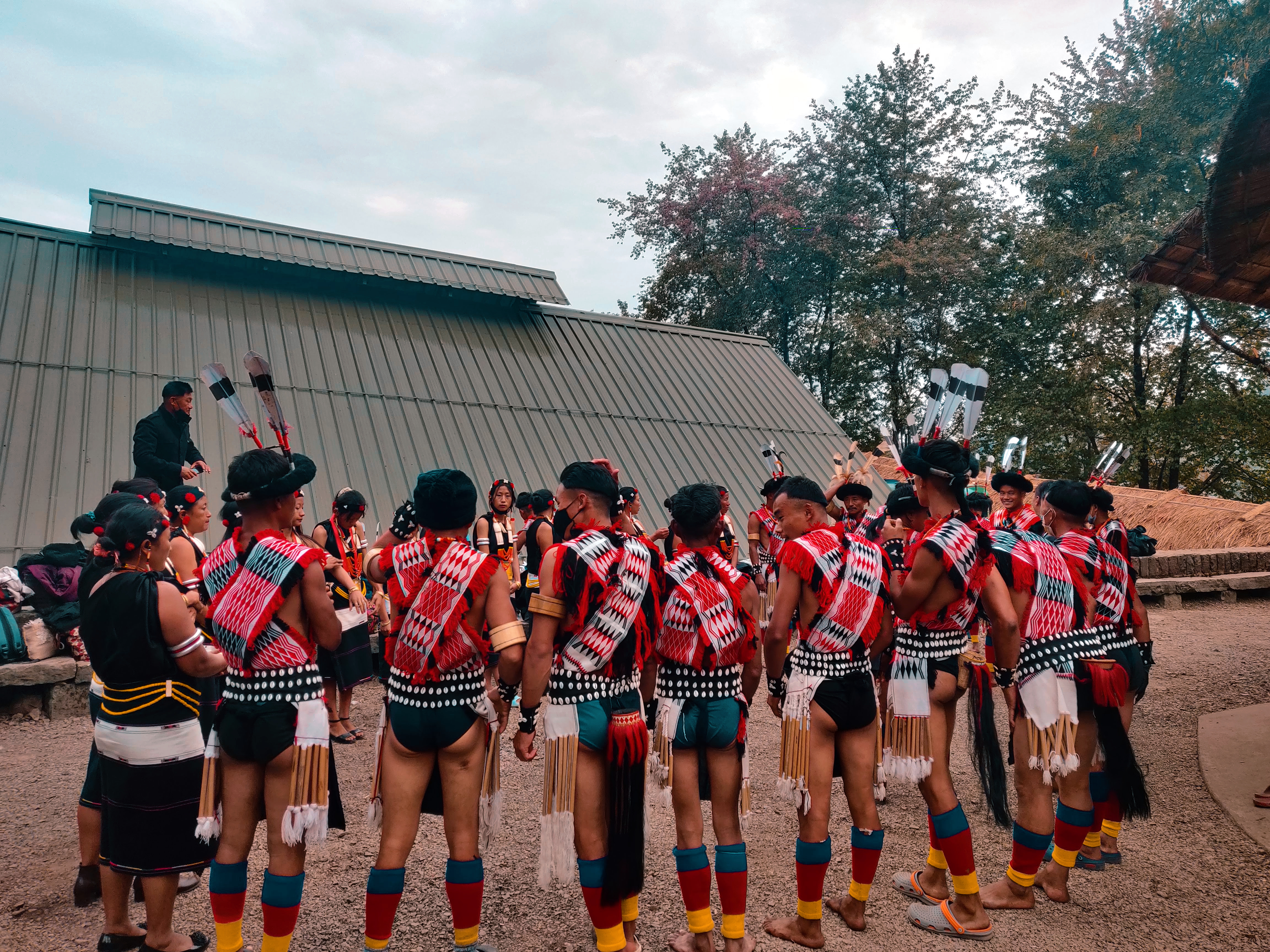
Rengma Nagas in their traditional attire.

According to the 2011 census of India the then Tseminyü circle of Kohima District had a population of 63,629. The majority of the inhabitants are the Rengma Nagas.

The total literacy rate of Niuland is 81.71%. The Child sex ratio is 980 which is greater than the Average Sex Ratio of 1,011.

=== Religion ===
Religion in Tseminyü district (2011)
1. Christianity (98.5%)
2. Hinduism (0.52%)
3. Buddhism (0.46%)
4. Islam (0.42%)
5. Others (0.11%)

According to the 2011 official census, Christianity is major religion in Tseminyu with small population of other religious minorities.

=== Towns and villages ===
In the 2011 census the erstwhile sub-division held 39 villages, spread over two administrative circles. Tseminyü circle comprises the town of Tseminyü (6,315), and the thirty-two villages. These are,

- Tesophenyü (11,116), Kandinu (3,938), Nsünyü (2,868), Tseminyü Vill. (2,863), Zisunyü (2,840), Phenshunyü (2,675), Sishunu (2,236), K. Station (2,169), Chunlikha (1,604), Terogunyü (1,559), Ziphenyü (1,495), Ehunnu (1,139), Kashanyü (833), Tseminyü South (765), Phenwhenyü (729), Rumensinyü (712), Khenyü (569), Sewanu (540), New Tesophenyü (516), Kashanyishi (428), Tsonsa (417), Ngvuphen (379), Gukhanyü (340), Yikhanu (331), Tseminyü Old Town (329), Henbenji (278), New Terogunyü (269), Khonibenzun (242), Likhwenchu (241), Guzinyü (222), Phenda (207), Zunpha Mission Centre (150).

The other circle, Tsogin circle comprises seven villages,

- Sendenyü (2,548), New Sendenyü (730), Tsosinyü (696), Rengmapani (627), Thongsunyü (464), Longwesunyü (429), Tsogin HQ (31).

== Transportation ==
=== Air ===
The nearest airport is Dimapur Airport located about 100 kilometres from the district headquarters at Tseminyü. The currently under construction airport at Kohima Chiethu Airport once completed will serve as the nearest airport to Tseminyü District.

=== Rail ===
The nearest railway station is the Chümoukedima Shokhüvi Railway Station located 100 kilometres away from Tseminyü.

=== Road ===
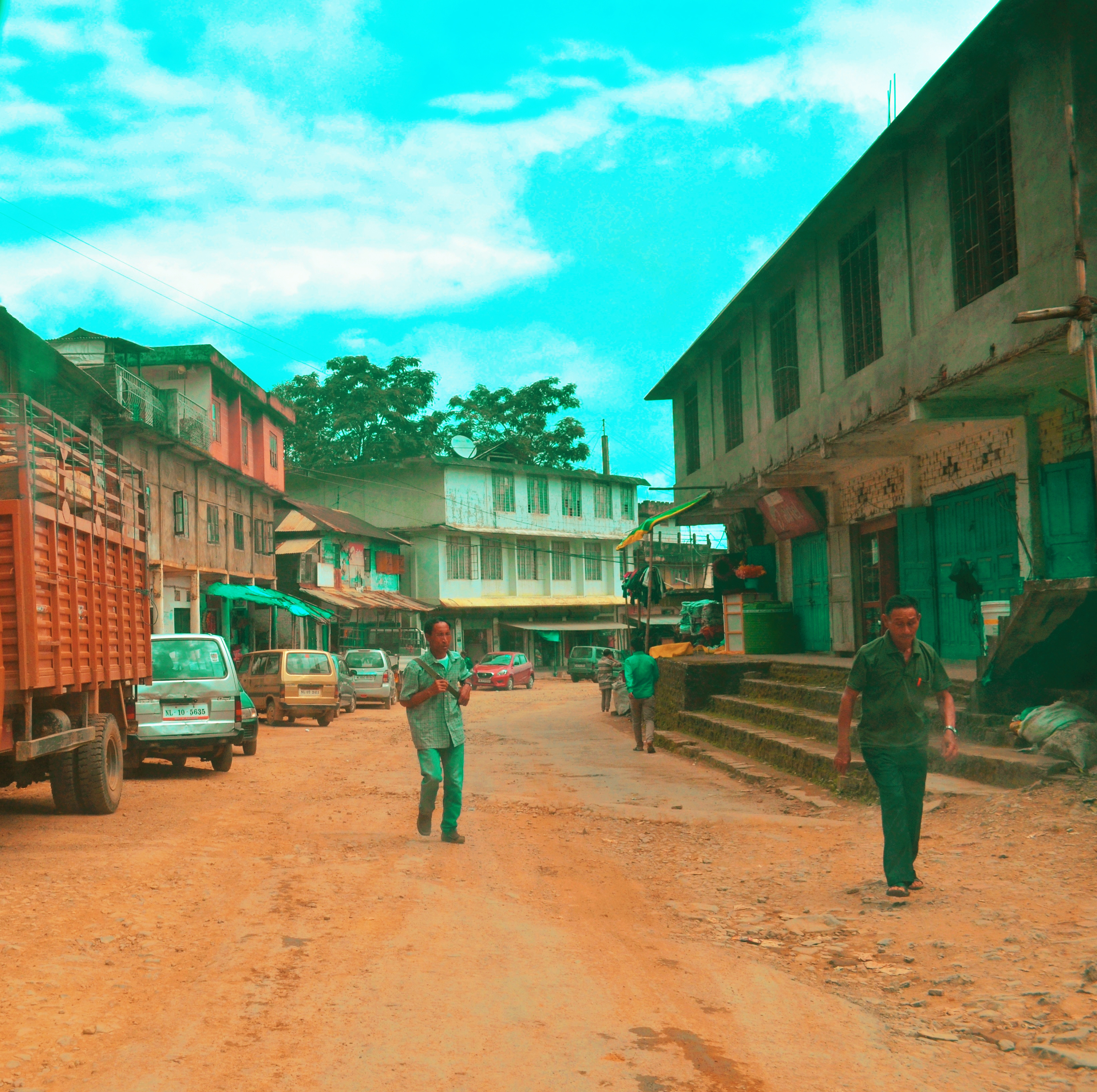
A national highway passing through Tseminyü town

The NH 2 passes through the district.

== See also ==
- Nagaland
