= Thangal people =

Ethnic group of Northeast India

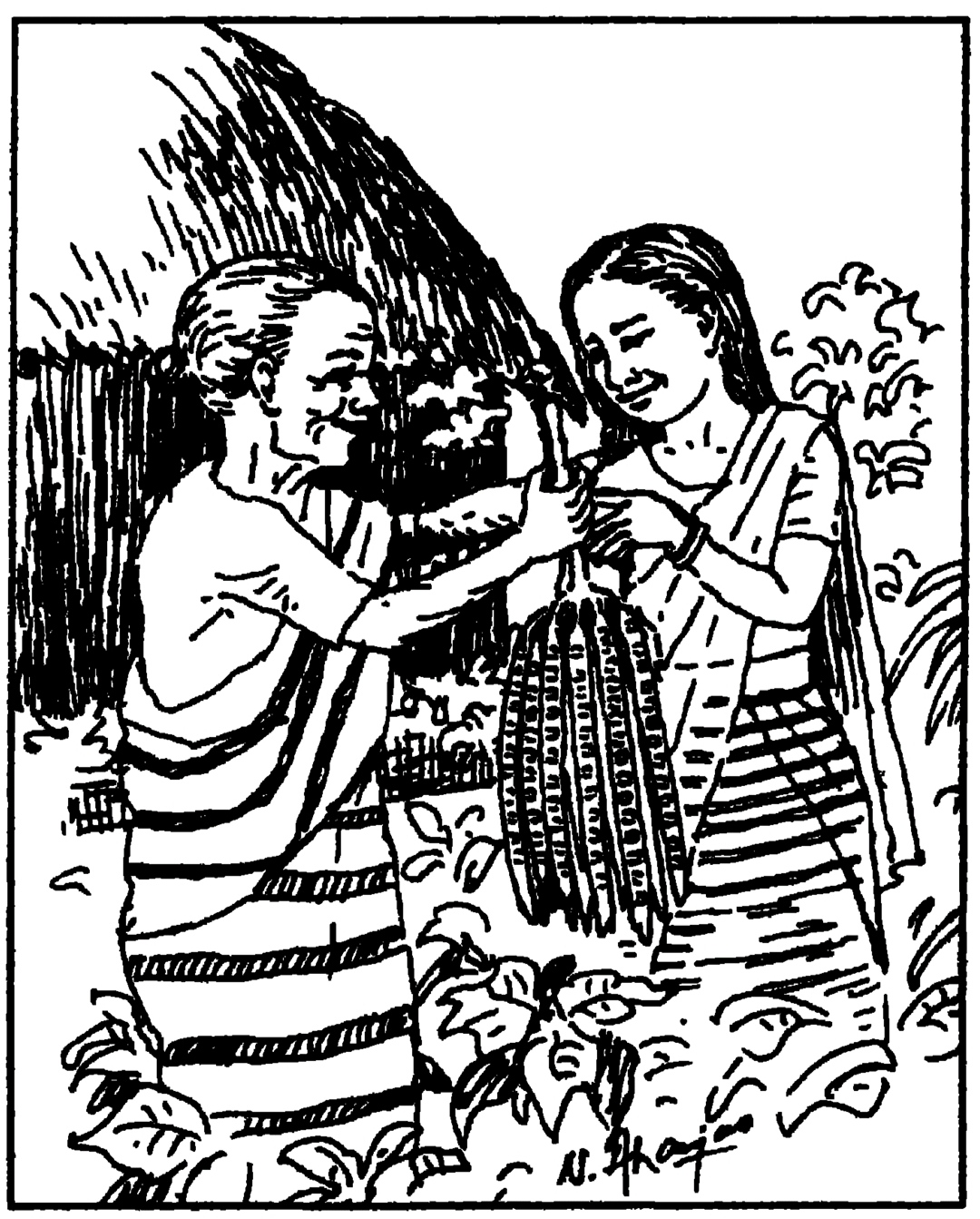
A Thangal tribal old woman of Thangal Surung village, presenting gifts, including Yongchaak (Meitei for 'Parkia speciosa'), to Khaidem Pramodini, a Meitei author from Imphal

The Thangal people (also known as Koirao) are a Tibeto-Burman ethnic group inhabiting Senapati district in the Northeast Indian state of Manipur. They speak the Thangal language, which resembles Maram, and Rongmei. They use Meitei language as their second language (L2) according to the Ethnologue.

Presently there are 13 Thangal villages. They are found in eleven hill villages of the Senapati District: Angkailongdi, Katomei Makeng, Makeng Cheijinba, Ngaihang, Mapao Thangal, Mayangkhang, Ningthoupham, Thangal Surung, Tumnoupokpi, Yaikongpao and Takaimei.

== Society ==
Traditionally, the Thangals are both horticulturalists and agriculturalists.

13 August is celebrated as Thangal Day. This is to commemorate the martyrdom of Lungthoubu Thangal, better known as Thangal Menjor, or popularly as Thangal general in the year 1891.
