= Phuba Khuman =

Coordinates: 25.427°N 94.257°E

Phuba Khuman Phyabu Phyamai
- village
- Interactive map of Phuba Khuman
- Country: India
- State: Manipur
- District: Senapati
- Elevation: 2,500 m (8,200 ft)

Languages
  - Official: Poula
- Time zone: UTC+5:30 (IST)
- PIN: 795015
- Vehicle registration: MN
- Website: manipur.gov.in

Phuba Khuman is a village and panchayat in Senapati district, Manipur, India. Phuba Khuman (also known as 'Phyabu'), located in Paomata of Senapati district, Manipur.

Phuba Khuman is also called as "PHYABU" which mean the original home of all the PHYAMAI - The Phubas, PHYA being a shorten form of PHYAMAI and BU meaning place. The name Phuba Khuman was given by the Meiteis. The original terminology for the Village name is PHYAMAI.

According to Census 2011 information the location code or village code of Phuba Khuman village is 268513. Phuba Khuman village is located in Paomata Tehsil of Senapati district in Manipur, India. It is situated 18 km away from sub-district headquarter Paomata and 68 km away from district headquarter Senapati.

Phuba Khuman has a total population of 5,526 peoples. There are about 898 houses in Phuba Khuman village. Paomata is nearest town to Phuba Khuman. Christianity is the religion of the village. Khyouchi Hill is situated in village.

== Etymology of the name ==
Phuba Khuman is also called as "PHYABU" which mean the original home of all the PHYAMAI - The Phubas, PHYA being a shorten form of PHYAMAI and BU meaning place. The name Phuba Khuman was given by the Meiteis. The original terminology for the Village name is PHYAMAI.

== Economy ==
Paddy rice, maize, potato, cabbage, cereals are the main economic crops of the village. Rice is the staple food. The cattle, buffalo, pig, goat are the main animals reared in the village. Poultry and fishery are common as well.
