= Tadubi =

- Village
- Location in Manipur, India Tadubi (India)
- Coordinates: 25°28′0″N 94°8′0″E
- Country: India
- State: Manipur
- District: Senapati

Languages
  - Official: Maola English meitei
- Time zone: UTC+5:30 (IST)
- PIN: 795104
- Vehicle registration: MN
- Coastline: 0 kilometres (0 mi)
- Website: manipur.gov.in

Tadubi is a village in Senapati district, Manipur, India. The predominant inhabitant of the town belong to Mao Naga tribe. The National Highway 39 passes through Tadubi.

== Demographics ==
According to the 2011 census of India, Tabdubi has a population of 5,847. Around 91% of the people belong to the Scheduled Tribes.

== Politics ==
Tadubi falls under the Old Manipur Lok Sabha Constituency and the Tadubi Assembly constituency.

== See also ==
- Hill College, Tadubi
