= Tungjoy =

- Village
- Location within Manipur Location within India
- Coordinates: 25.484°N 94.236°E
- Country: India
- State: Manipur
- District: Senapati

Population (2011)
  - Total: 5,988
- Time zone: UTC+5:30 (IST)
- PIN: 795104

Tungjoy is a village in Senapati district, Manipur, India. It is one of the largest villages of the Poumai tribe.

In January 2020, a campaign was launched for an Indian Reserve Battalion post to be built in the village, pending construction of the village's police station.

In May 2020, people of the village built 80 huts for use in quarantine of people from the surrounding areas, during the COVID-19 pandemic in India.

== Economy ==
Paddy rice, cabbages, potatoes, maize, and cereals are some of the economic crops of the village. Cabbage farming is the main source of income. Rice is the staple food. Cattle, buffalo, and pigs are the main animals reared in the village. Poultry and fish are common as well.
