= Maram people =

Tibeto-Burmese Naga ethnic group in northeast India

Maram
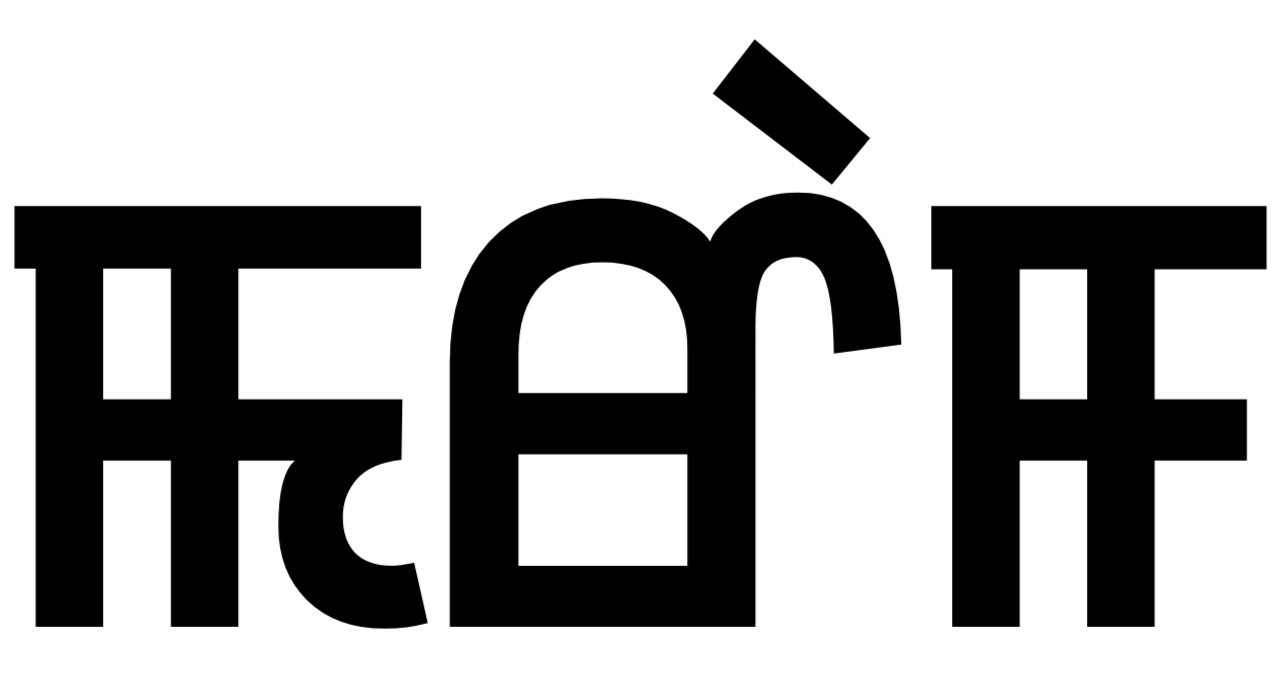
- "Maram" written in Meitei script

Regions with significant populations
- Maram, Senapati District, Manipur, India: 10,911 (1988).37,300(2011)

Languages
- Maram language (L1); Meitei language (L2)

Religion
- Christianity, Animism

Related ethnic groups
- Tenyimi (Angami Naga · Chakhesang Naga · Mao Naga · Poumai Naga · Rengma Naga · Zeme Naga)

The Maram people, also known as the Maram Naga, are a Tibeto-Burmese Naga ethnic group inhabiting the large portion of Senapati district in the Northeast Indian state of Manipur. They use Meitei language as their second language (L2) according to the Ethnologue.

== Demographics ==
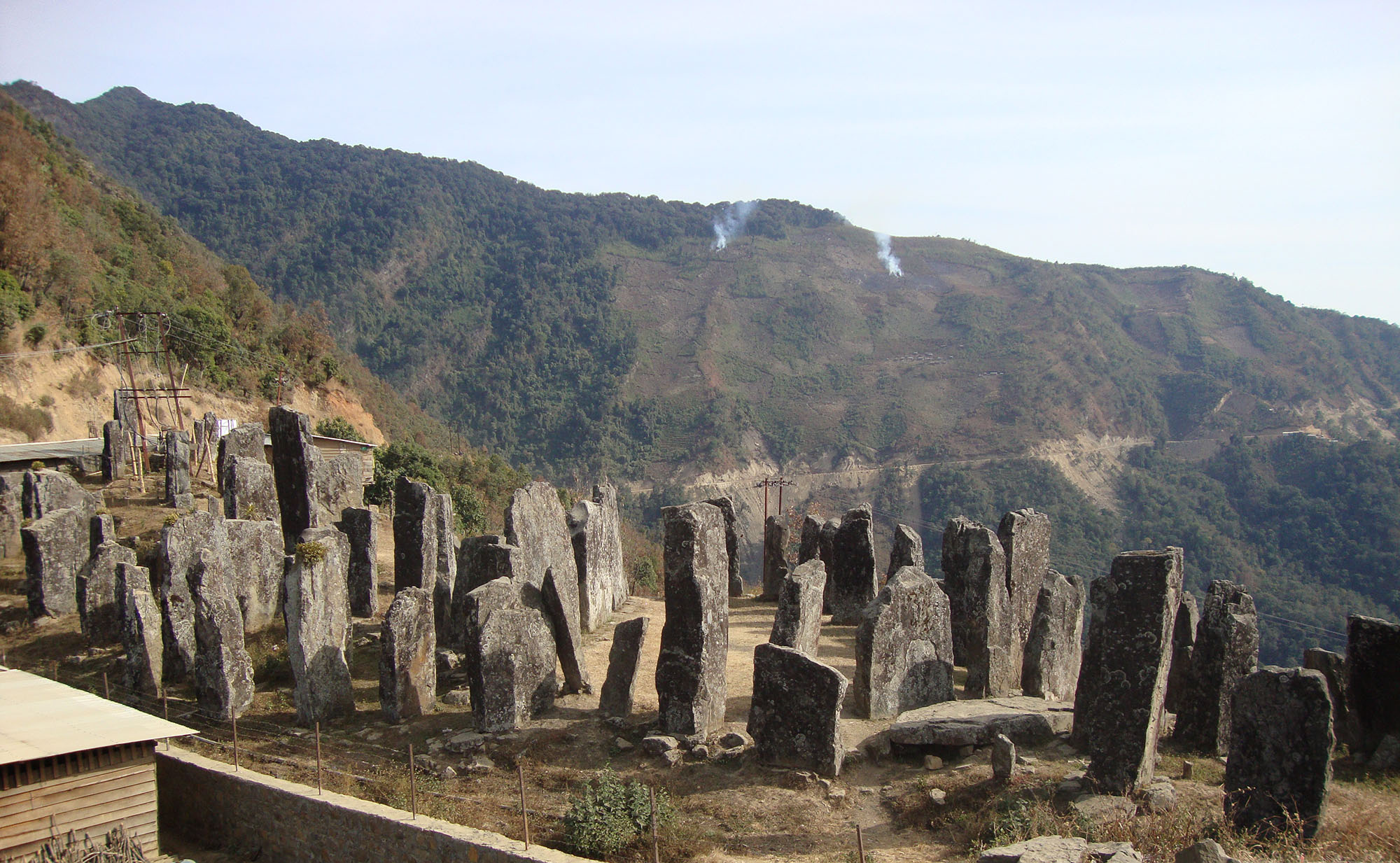
Menhirs at Willong Khullen. Willong is the second largest village of Marams, according to the 1992 figures.

Marams are mainly found in the Senapti district of Manipur. According to the 1992 figures, the Maram Khullen was the largest village of Marams, followed by Willong.

== Culture ==
The Marams are known for wet-rice cultivation on terraces of the hill slopes and the very small alluvial plain of the flat landform created by the deposition of sediment near river areas because of this labor-intensive cultivation, land is the most important form of property among them. This allows them to cultivate the same plot year after year however, to a small extent, on slash-and-burn cultivation is still done in small pockets mainly by the Marams settled in the southern region.

== Bibliography ==
- Joseph Athickal (1992). Maram Nagas, a socio-cultural study (illustrated ed.). Mittal. ISBN 978-81-7099-354-4.
