= Mao people (India) =

Mao Naga
Shüpfomei
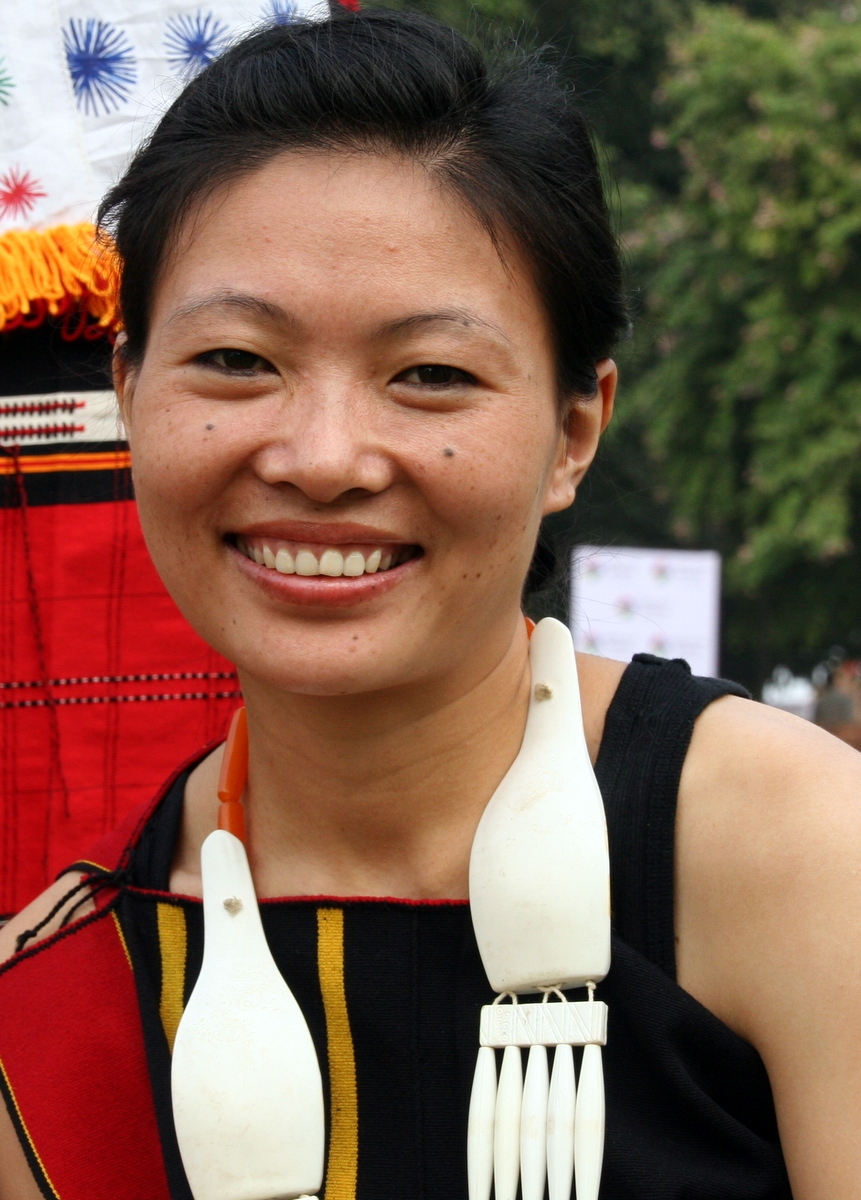

Total population
- 97,195 (2011)

Languages
- Mao Naga

Religion
- Christianity, traditional religion (minority)

Related ethnic groups
- Tenyimi (Angami Naga · Chakhesang Naga · Poumai Naga · Maram Naga · Rengma Naga · Zeme Naga)

The Mao people (also known as Mao Naga and Shüpfomei) are a Tibeto-Burman major ethnic group constituting the Nagas inhabiting Nagaland in Northeast India.

== Etymology and subgroups ==
The Mao people are composed of four sub-groups: the Ememei, Lepaona, Chüluve, and Paomata. The sub-groups come from naming based on a common male ancestor. 'Shüpfomei' is the original endonym of the Mao. Colonial-era translators found it difficult to correctly pronounce Ememei, so instead they called them 'Maomei' and eventually started calling all Shüpfomei 'Mao'.

== Language ==
George van Driem put the Mao language as one of the Angami-Pochuri languages, classified as an independent branch of the Tibeto-Burman languages. Mao forms part of the Naga genus of the Tibeto-Burman subfamily of the Sino-Tibetan family. It displays a lot of variations in tonality, spelling and pronunciation among the Mao villages, suggesting a lack of interaction in the past. Many of the physical and metaphysical objects are referred to by different names by different villages. The degree of variation gets considerably widened with the neighbouring dialect groups such as the Poumai and the Angami, although the Maos can inter-communicate fully with many of the villages in the Poumai group and to a certain extent in the Angami group.

In popular Mao folklore, there is a story transmitted through an old folksong which says that each of the three brothers descended from the first man was given a language and a script scrolled on three different materials by their father. The eldest son was given the script scrolled on a bark, the middle one on a bamboo culm sheath and the youngest on a hide. As the youngest of the brothers, the forefather of the Nagas did not understand the significance of having a script and casually tucked away the scroll at the side of his bed. Over time, the scroll was lost and the Nagas lost a major tool in the advancement of knowledge. Since the script was scrolled on a hide, it was thought that the scroll was nibbled away by mice. Later, suspicion arose that the two older brothers might have conspired to deprive their brother of the script as later interactions among the brothers showed the reluctance of the two older siblings to accept their youngest brother as an equal.

Similar stories are shared by many of the unrelated ethnic groups such as the Khasis, Kukis and several Naga people. A very persuasive hypothesis is that "these stories represent a tribal memory of time when they were associated with a literate civilization, perhaps in Southeast Asia or China, before their migration to India. Being peripheral to that civilization, they were unable to preserve its literacy skills once their migrations began."

== Mao in Naga tradition ==
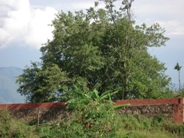
The sacred Wild Pear Tree (Chiitebu Kajii), standing at Shajouba (Charangho) in the Mao area, believed to have been planted at the time of migration of the Nagas to different areas.

The Mao village of Makhel holds a central place in Naga tradition in connection with a belief that the Nagas at one point of time settled here and later dispersed to their present areas of habitation, but not before erecting monuments that would signify their communion and a pledge to reunite in the future. The village of Makhel and the surrounding areas have several historical as well as mythological monuments and relics that are of interest to ethnographers, historians and cultural anthropologists.

The significance of the beliefs and mythologies that are associated with it is that they help us to understand and to piece together their past which is otherwise shrouded in obscure and unrelated stories and legends. Many scholars and writers have tried to piece together the folklores of the Naga people to construct an intelligible map of migration to their present habitat. Most of these accounts differ in details, as also in their conclusions. However, the one thing that has gained wide acceptance and currency is the view that they came to their present habitat in waves of migration, of which two major waves are fairly detailed.

The more numerous group of these two waves of migration point to the Mao village of Makhel (Makhrai Rabu in Mao language), and also to Khezhakenoma, a Chakhesang village, 7-8 kilometres northward of Makhel. Included in this group are the Maos, Poumais, Marams, Thangal, Angamis, Chakhesangs, Rengma, Lothas, Sümis and the Zeliangrongs people. The belief of Makhel origin is also shared by some other groups in some accounts. While some of the ethnic groups who are situated farther away from Makhel have fuzzy accounts of the particular place, the Maos, Poumais, Marams, Angamis, Chakhesangs and the Zeliangrongs, clearly indicate Makhel as their place of origin, which properly understood means that they once lived at the place and moved away from there to their present areas of habitation. The groups which claim the Makhel origin are collectively called the Tenyimis. However, some more ethnic groups have come to share the legends of Makhel which did not figure originally in the Tenyimi group.

Although the ancestors of the ethnic group at one point of time, come and lived at Makhel and the surrounding areas, population increase must have made them to push outwards to find new habitations. In popular folklore, before departing, they converged at the foot of a wild pear tree, which is believed to be the sacred pear tree standing at Shajouba, about a kilometer away from Makhel, and made a pact to come together one day.

The ethnic groups that went northwards such as the Angamis, the Chakhesangs, the Rengmas, the Lothas and the Sümis mention Khezhakenoma also as a place where they had once lived. The rest of the groups such as the Mao Naga, the Poumais, the Marams, the Thangals and the Zeliangrongs, who moved westward, eastward and southward, do not have knowledge or mention of the place in their folklore. It is quite probable that the northern ethnic group, when they dispersed from Makhel, took the Khezhakenoma route and lived there for a period of time.

The second major wave of migration can be adduced from the folklores narrated by the Aos, some of the Konyaks, and a section of the Chang people. The Aos in their folklore narrate how they emerged from stones called Lungterok (meaning six stones in Ao language) at Chongliyimti which is in the present Sangtam area. Collectively claimed as the Chongliyimti clan, they are widely spread in different areas in the northern side of the Naga country.

These waves of migration are believed to be the tail-end of a long migration of a much larger group which started from the confluence of Mongolia and China and spread out over south-east Asia, Tibet and the north-eastern part of South Asia in prehistoric times.

== Folklores and tradition ==
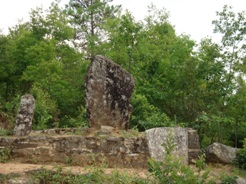
Three menhirs, commemorating the meeting of the three brothers – Okhe (meaning 'Tiger' representing all of the animal kingdom), Orah (meaning 'God' representing all of the supernatural world) and Omei (meaning 'mankind') who, in the Mao mythology, are said to have descended from a common mother. Two menhirs, representing Orah and Omei, stand upright on the eastern side with the third (representing Okhe) on the western side lies flat on the cairn, at Chazhilophi, south of Makhel or Makhrai Rabu, a Mao Naga village in Manipur state of India. Makhrai Rabu is also believed to be the ancestral village of the Nagas who first settled there after years of migration and before further migrating to their present areas of habitation.

The village of Makhel and the surrounding areas in the land of the Maos have garnered the attention of ethnographers and archaeologists alike because of the various artifacts present and the folklore stories and legends associated with them.

There is a legend in Mao folklore which tells of the first woman named Dziilimosiiro (Dziilimosiia to some others according to variation in the dialect) from whom the whole of mankind has descended. One day a column of clouds enveloped her while she was asleep under a banyan tree, and she conceived. She gave birth to 'Okhe' (Tiger), 'Orah' (God) and 'Omei' (Man), in that order with Okhe as the eldest and Omei the youngest. Life went on and many years passed. In her old age, the mother became weak and fell ill. Each of her sons took turns to stay at home and care for her while the other two went away for daily activities in the forests gathering food. The story goes that on the day Okhe stayed at home with the mother, he pestered her by pointing at all parts of her body saying it would eat such and such part after her death. On other days when Orah took his turn to nurse her, her illness grew worse.

When it was Omei’s turn to care for her, the mother was happy because he took good care of her. The mother dreaded the day when Okhe and Orah would take their turn to nurse her. As her condition grew worse, Omei thought to himself that he should do something to let her die peacefully on a day when he was with her. So, he collected some chillies which grew in the wild and cooked it into a soup thinking that it would slowly kill her. On taking the soup, the mother got better and thereafter asked for more of it. Time passed, and unfortunately the old mother died on a day when Omei was with her. Omei buried her under the family hearth as his mother instructed him to do before her death, and put the hearth stones back into place so as to make it look like nothing happened. He also dug at various places so that fresh earth could be seen everywhere. When Okhe came back home and noticed that the mother was not there, it enquired of Omei about her. Omei told him the truth about their mother's death, but wouldn't divulge where he buried her. Okhe pawed and dug at all places to find the mother's body, but could not find it. He had missed the hearth place as it did not occur to him that she could be buried under the hearth. From thereon, the tradition that the family can bury their dead beneath their hearth originated, though the practice is not common.

Over time, conflict of interest arose among the three brothers. Okhe was always looking for an opportunity to harm his youngest brother with the intention of making him its meal. Omei, wary of his brother's intentions, created a sleeping place high up on the roof beyond the reach of Okhe. One day, when Omei was asleep, Okhe came into the house and saw his brother's reflection in the long tubular water drum below. Thinking this was the opportunity, it dived in only to find that it was full of water. The splash woke up Omei and thereafter he began to think of ways to get rid of his menacing brother. Seemingly, with all innocence, he asked Okhe what it feared the most. Okhe replied that nothing could frighten him except the sound of a booming thunder. After getting the cue, Omei took a gourd, hollowed it out and put some pebbles into the dried shell. He tied it to Okhe’s waist while it was asleep. He then took his bugle, made from the long stem of a tubular plant called 'makhi', and sounded it sharply into Okhe’s ears. On hearing the loud bugle, Okhe leaped to its feet and fled. As the pebbles made a sound in the gourd shell with its every leap, Okhe fled and fled until it was deep into the dark jungle in the western hills (Evele). In the meantime, Orah decided to go to the south (Kashiilei) where the sun was warm, in the lowland valley. Thus, the three brothers went their own ways.

In another version, it is said that the conflict over who would inherit the motherland (called the ‘navel’ of the earth, meaning the middle ground) was resolved through a contest—a race—on the instruction of the mother. For the purpose, she set up three stone monoliths as the target, one for each of them, and decided that the one who reached or touched it first would be the heir to the motherland. In the first contest, Okhe overtook the other two, and reached the target first. However, their mother objected to it and accused Okhe of making an earlier, and therefore false, start as she wanted her favourite and youngest son, Omei, to inherit the motherland. She then instructed Omei to create a bow and how he should reached the target with an arrow. In the contest, Omei, with the help of his bow, reached the target with an arrow and thus claimed his right as the heir to the motherland to which the mother agreed.

A variation of the second version says that the contest happened after the mother died. The target was a bunch of leaves rolled on a twig, called prodzii in Mao language. Orah, being a benign being, was more compassionate towards the youngest brother Omei who had to face bullying from Okhe, the ferocious brother, as he could not match the physical strength of the latter. So, unlike the version which has the mother instructing the youngest son to use an arrow, it was the second brother Orah who instructed his younger brother Omei to use an arrow to hit the target. Omei did as he was instructed and claimed his right to the heartland or motherland. The three menhirs at Chazhilophi (near Makhel village), representing Tiger, Spirit and Man were erected in commemoration of the three brothers who once lived together.

== Bibliography ==
- Nepuni, William (2010). Socio-cultural History of Shüpfomei Naga Tribe. Mittal Publications. ISBN 9788183243070.
- Franco, F. Merlin; Knudsen, Magne; Hassan, Noor Hasharina (2022). Case Studies in Biocultural Diversity from Southeast Asia. Springer Nature Singapore. ISBN 9789811667190.
