= Senapati district =

- District of Manipur
- Location in Manipur
- Interactive map of Senapati district
- Coordinates: 25.27°N 94.025°E
- Country: India
- State: Manipur
- Headquarters: Senapati (Tahamzam)
- Tehsils: 1. Purul, 2. Paomata, 3. Mao-Maram,

Government
  - Vidhan Sabha constituencies: 6: Saikul, Karong, Mao, Tadubi, Kangpokpi and Saitu

Area
  - Total: 1,573 km^{2} (607 sq mi)
  - Rank: 8

Population (2011)
  - Total: 285,404
  - Density: 181.4/km^{2} (469.9/sq mi)

Demographics
  - Literacy: 74.13%
  - Sex ratio: 923

Language(s)
  - Official: English
  - Regional: Mao
- Time zone: UTC+05:30 (IST)
- Vehicle registration: MN03
- Website: senapati.nic.in

Senapati district (Meitei pronunciation: /se.na.pə.ti/) is one of the 16 districts of the Indian state of Manipur. The present Senapati district was formed in December 2016, after spawning off the Sadar Hills region in the south into a separate Kangpokpi district. The district headquarter is located in the town of Senapati, also known as Tahamzam.

== History ==
2011 district map of Manipur; the Senapati district was divided into the present Senapati district and Kangpokpi district in 2016

The Senapati district began as the Mao Subdivision of the Manipur State after its merger with the Republic of India. By 1961, it was enlarged into the "Mao and Sadar Hills" subdivision, by combining the sadar hills (central hills) adjoining the Imphal region.

In 1969, Manipur was divided into five districts, with Mao and Sadar Hills becoming one of them. It was also called the "Manipur North" district, with a headquarters at Karong. It had three subdivisions: Mao West, Mao East and Sadar Hills.

During the late 1950s and 1960s, the Kuki tribes living in the northern hills of Manipur faced large-scale displacement, as a result of the activism of the Naga National Council attempting to homogenise the population in those areas. The displaced Kuki tribes moved inwards into the state and occupied regions in the Sadar Hills subdivision. This gave the Sadar Hills subdivision a distinct character.

The Sadar Hills Kuki Chiefs' Zonal Council resolved in 1970 to demand a separate district for Sadar Hills, and submitted a memorandum to the Union Home Minister K. C. Pant. In 1971, shortly before Manipur became a full-fledged state, the Government of India enacted the Manipur (Hill Areas) District Council Act, 1971, granting autonomous district councils (ADCs) for the hill regions. Two separate ADCs, for Sadar Hills and Manipur North, were established in 1972. However, due to opposition from the Nagas, Sadar Hills was not made into a separate district, and continued as part of Manipur North.

In 1976, the district headquarters was shifted to the town of Senapati. In 1981, there were three subdivisions in Manipur North: Mao-Maram, based at Tadubi, Sadar Hills West, based at Kangpokpi and Sadar Hills East, based at Saikul. Efforts made by successive governments of Manipur to separate the Sadar Hills subdivisions into an independent district failed. During the Kuki–Naga clashes of the 1990s, further displacement of Kukis occurred into the Sadar Hills region and perhaps also displacement of Nagas out of the region.

Finally, in 2016, the Okram Ibobi Singh government, in one of its last acts before the election, formed seven new districts by bifurcating existing districts, with Sadar Hills being one of them. It was named the Kangpokpi district with a headquarters at Kangpokpi. The United Naga Council conducted a five-month blockade in the Naga districts of Manipur to protest the creation of the new districts and continues its opposition as of 2024.

The remaining Naga-dominated district continues under the name Senapati district.

== Geography ==
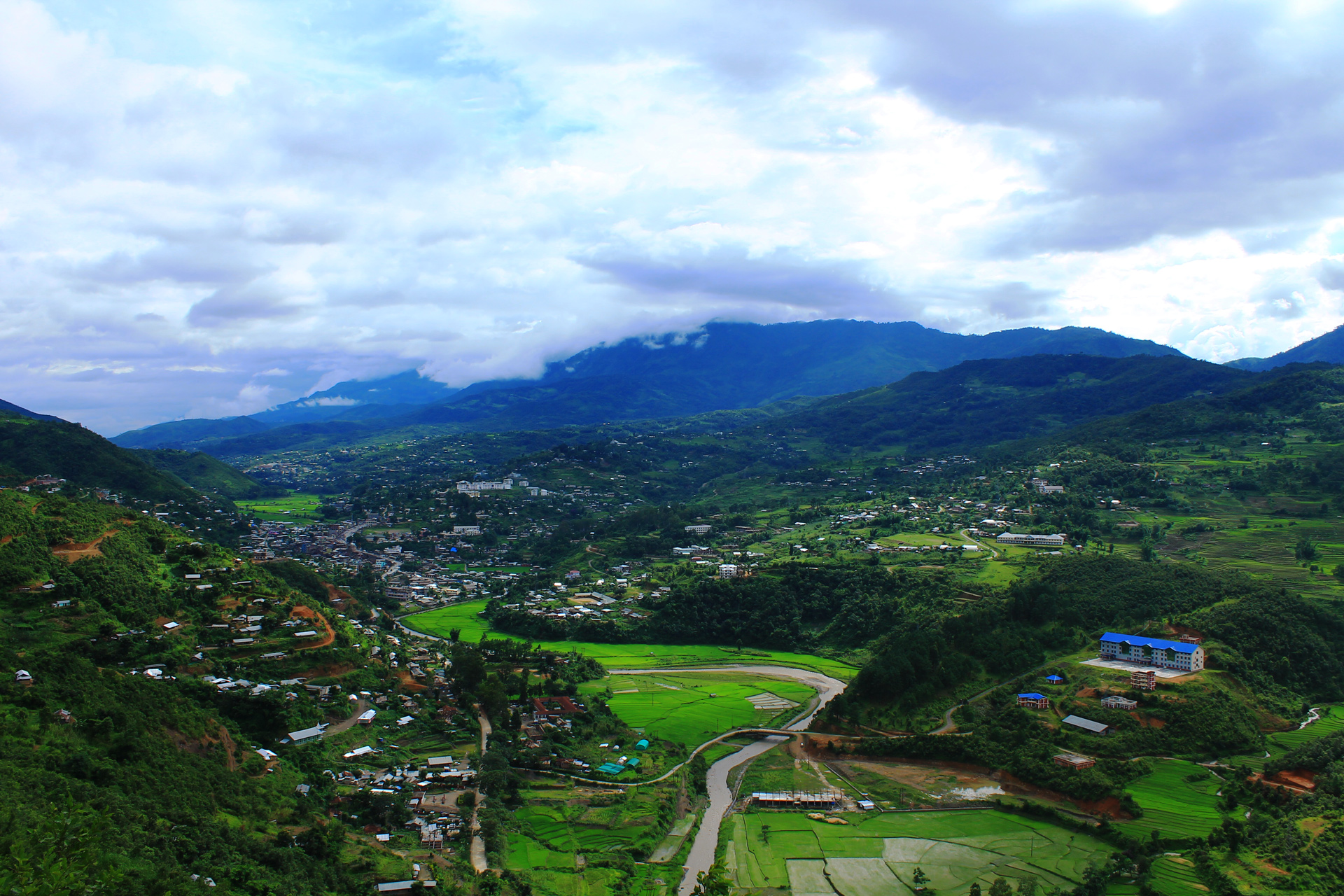
View of Senapati

Senapati District is located between 93.29° and 94.15° East Longitude and 24.37° and 25.37° North Latitude and is in the northern part of Manipur state. The District is bounded on the south by Kangpokpi District, on the east by Ukhrul district, on the west by Tamenglong district and on the north by Kohima District and Phek district of Nagaland state. The district lies at an altitude between 1061 meter to 1788 meters above sea level.

The Dzuko Valley (Meitei: Dzuko Tampak), is one of the tourist attractions in Manipur, renowned for natural sites, seasonal flowering plants and wild life, including but not limited to the endemic Dzuko lily (Lilium chitrangadae), which is closely related to the Shirui lily (Lilium mackliniae) of the neighbouring Ukhrul district.

== Governance ==
The Deputy Commissioner (DC) serves as the administrative head of the district and also holds the role of District Magistrate. The DC is supported by an Additional Deputy Commissioner (ADM/ADC), Assistant Commissioner (AC), Sub-Divisional Collector (SDC) Headquarters, and other SDCs overseeing various sections such as development, revenue, and relief. At the subdivision level, Sub-Divisional Officers assist the DC in administrative functions. To maintain law and order, the Superintendent of Police (SP) for Senapati works in coordination with the DC.

The district is divided into numerous Subdivisions, each of which is under the management by an SDO. These subdivisions are: Mao Maram, Paomata, Purul, Willong, Chilivai-Phaibung, Song Song, and Lairouching. This is to facilitate local governance and administration.

Senapati is home to an Autonomous District Council (ADC), which were established under the Manipur (Hill Areas) Districts Council Act of 1971. However as opposed to 6th Schedule Autonomous District Council, the Autonomous District Councils under the Manipur Act have limited legislative powers. This Council is intended to give autonomy in governing local concerns, particularly those involving tribal groups in the hill areas. They play an important role in local government, development planning, and the execution of programs suited to the needs of the communities.

== Demographics ==
Historical population
Year	Pop.	±%
1951	46,608	—
1961	70,792	+51.9%
1971	102,291	+44.5%
1981	153,091	+49.7%
1991	208,406	+36.1%
2001	283,621	+36.1%
2011	479,148	+68.9%
† 2011 Senapati district (includes the present Kangpokpi district); Source: Census of India

According to the 2011 census Senapati district has a population of 479,148 roughly equal to the nation of Belize. This gives it a ranking of 565th in India (out of a total of 640). The district has a population density of 109 inhabitants per square kilometre (280/sq mi). Its population growth rate over two decades 1991-2011 was 129.9 percent, which works out to an average decadal growth rate of 51.6 percent over these two decades. (Note: Precise decadal numbers are not available since the enumerated data for 2001 census in the three northern subdivisions of the district was discarded as being inaccurate.) Senapati has a sex ratio of 939 females for every 1000 males and a literacy rate of 75%. Its population composition as per the 2011 census is as below:

	Population	Percentage of Total Pop.
All Scheduled Tribes	419,210	87.5%
Kuki-Zo tribes (Note: The Kuki-Zo tribes include Gangte, Hmar, Paite, Simte, Sukte, Thadou, Vaiphei, Zou, and some smaller tribes designated as "Any Kuki" and "Any Lushai (Mizo)".)	110,314	23.0%
Naga tribes (Note: The Naga tribes include Angami, Kabui, Kacha Naga, Mao, Maram, Poumai, Sema and Tangkhul.)	282,007	58.9%
Old Kuki/Naga (Note: The Old Kuki tribes retaining the Kuki classification include: Aimol, Chiru, Kom, Koireng, Kharam, and Ralte. The tribes under the Naga umbrella include: Anal, Chothe, Koirao, Lamkang, Maring, Moyon, Monsang, Purum and Tarao.)	19,244	4.0%

Religions in Senapati district (2011)
Religion	Percent
Christianity	95.31%
Hinduism	3.36%
Other or not stated	1.33%

Languages in Senapati district (2011)
1. Poumai 62.8 (54.2%)
2. Mao 29.89 (25.8%)
3. Maram 10.67 (9.21%)
4. Nepali 2.84 (2.45%)
5. Zemi 2.65 (2.29%)
6. Khezha 1.75 (1.51%)
7. Liangmai 1.55 (1.34%)
8. Zeliang 0.95 (0.82%)
9. Others 2.71 (2.34%)

After the separation of the Kangpokpi district in 2016, the residual district has a population of 285,404 as per 2011 census, all of which lives in rural areas. it has a sex ratio of 923 females per 1000 males. Scheduled Castes and Scheduled Tribes make up 0.10% and 92.74% of the population respectively.

=== Religion ===
Christianity is the majority, religion, practised by 95.31% of the population. Hinduism is the second-largest religion, practised by 3.36% of the population. Small numbers practice other religions, such as Islam, Buddhism, and Heraka. Nearly all tribals are Christians, with only a small minority of the Zeliang practising Heraka.

=== Languages ===
At the time of the 2011 census,62.8% of the population spoke Poumai, 29.89% Mao, 10.67% Maram, 2.84% Nepali, 2.65% Zemi, 1.75% Khezha, 1.55% Liangmai and 0.95% Zeliang as their first language.

== Villages ==
- Khamsom
- Maiba
- Onaeme Hill
- Paomata Centre
- Phuba Khuman
- Phuba Thapham
- Purul
- Tadubi
- Tungjoy
- Gaziphema, more popularly known as Laii
- Phaibung

== See also ==
- List of populated places in Senapati district
- Maphou

== Bibliography ==
- Manipur Administrative Atlas (PDF), Census of India, Government of India, 2005
- Haokip, Thongkholal (Winter 2012), "District status for Sadar Hills in Manipur", Man and Society, IX: 92–112, SSRN 2559085 – via ssrn
- Haokip, Thongkholal (2023), "Home and Belonging in Northeast India", in Amit Ranjan; Diotima Chattoraj (eds.), Migration, Regional Autonomy, and Conflicts in Eastern South Asia: Searching for a Home(land) (PDF), Springer Nature, ISBN 9783031287640 – via academia.edu
