= Maram language =

Sino-Tibetan language spoken in India

Maram
- Maram Naga
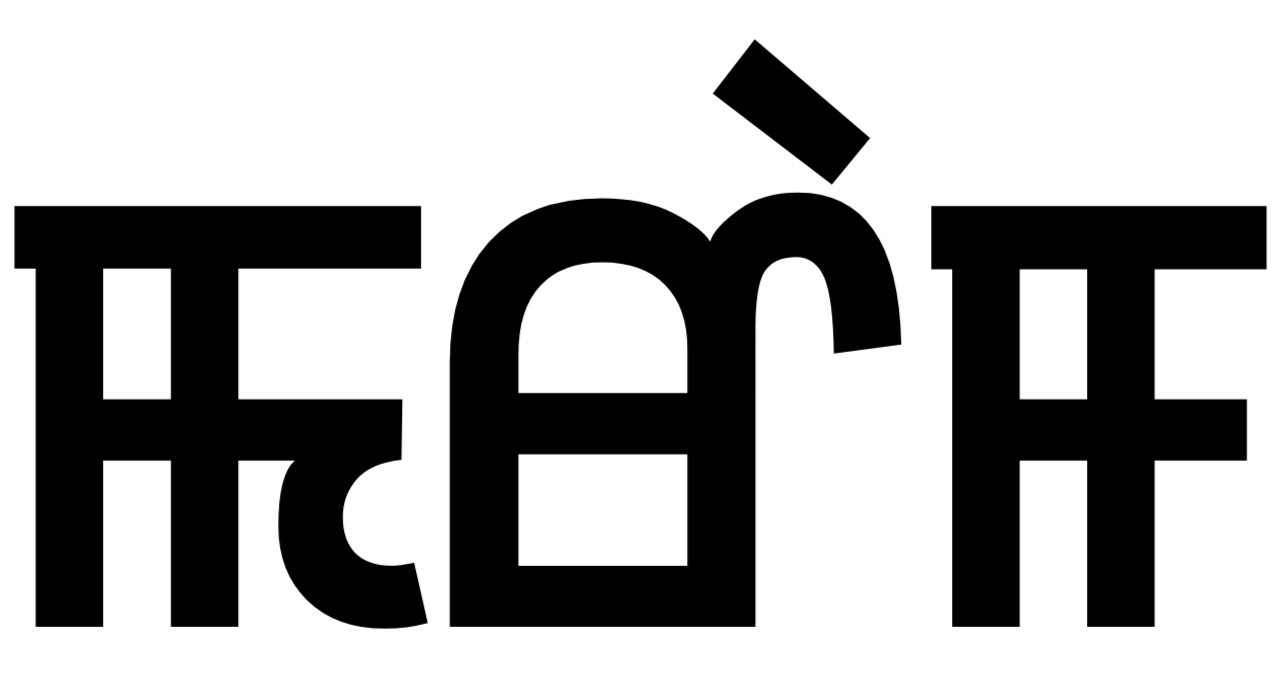
- Maram written in Meitei script
- Region: Manipur, Assam
- Ethnicity: Maram people
- Native speakers: 33,000 (2011)
- Language family: Sino-Tibetan: Tibeto-Burman; Central Tibeto-Burman (?); Kuki-Chin–Naga; Zemeic; Maram

Language codes
- ISO 639-3: nma
- Glottolog: mara1379
- ELP: Maram Naga

Maram is a Sino-Tibetan language spoken in India. The speakers of this language use Meitei language as their second language (L2) according to the Ethnologue.

== Locations ==
Ethnologue reports that Maram is spoken in the following locations.

- Senapati district, northern Manipur: 5 villages near Senapati, and 26 villages near Maram
- Imphal district, Manipur
- Assam

== Dialects ==
Ethnologue lists the following dialects of Maram:

- Willong Circle
- Maram Khullen Circle
- T. Khullen
- Ngatan
