= Mao language (India) =

Sino-Tibetan language spoken in India

Mao
- Sopvoma, Emela, Mao' La
- Pronunciation: mau
- Native to: India
- Region: Nagaland, Manipur
- Ethnicity: Mao Naga, Poumai Naga
- Native speakers: 240,205 (2011 census)
- Language family: Sino-Tibetan: Tibeto-Burman; Kuki-Chin-Naga; Angami–Pochuri; Mao

Official status
- Recognised minority language in: India

Language codes
- ISO 639-3: Either: nbi – Mao pmx – Poumei Naga
- Glottolog: naga1397
- ELP: Mao Naga

Mao, also known as Sopvoma, is a Sino-Tibetan language of the Angami–Pochuri linguistic sub-branch. It is spoken primarily in Senapati district, northwestern Manipur and in Nagaland, India. It is similar to Tenyidie.

== Phonology ==
=== Consonants ===
		Labial	Dental	Alveolar	Palatal	Velar	Glottal
Plosive	voiceless	p	t̪	t		k	
Plosive	aspirated	pʰ	(t̪ʰ)	tʰ		kʰ	
Plosive	voiced	b	d̪			(ɡ)	
Affricate	voiceless	p͡f		t͡s	t͡ʃ		
Affricate	aspirated	(p͡fʰ)			t͡ʃʰ		
Affricate	voiced	b͡v		d͡z	d͡ʒ		
Fricative	voiceless	f		s	ʃ		h
Fricative	voiced	v		z	ʒ		
Nasal		m		n		ŋ	
Trill	voiced			r			
Trill	voiceless			ʰr̥			
Lateral				l			
Approximant		(w)			j		

- /t͡ʃʰ/ and /w/ only rarely occur, and with /t͡ʃʰ/ only occurring in word-initial position.
- The pre-aspirated voiceless /ʰr̥/, may have a word-initial allophone of [ʂ], [ʂ] rarely occurs phonemically.
- [ɡ] only occurs marginally from loanwords.
- /t̪, p͡f/ in word-initial position may be heard as [t̪ʰ, p͡fʰ] in free variation, rarely as phonemic.
- /h/ may have an allophone of [x] word-initially, word medially in free variation. [x] rarely occurs as a phoneme.
- /m/ before a central vowel /ɨ/ can have an allophone of a labiodental [ɱ].
- /n/ before high vowel sounds can have an allophone of a palatalized [nʲ].

=== Vowels ===
	Front	Central	Back
Close	i	ɨ	u
Mid	e	(ə)	o
Open		a	

- [ə] only occurs inter-morphemically.
- /ɨ/ can be heard as rounded [ʉ] in free variation.
- In word-initial position, /i, u/ can be lowered to [ɪ, ʊ].
- /e, o/ can be lowered to [ɛ, ɔ] in word-final position.
