= Poula language =

Angami-Pochuri language

Poula
- Poumai
- Native to: Manipur, Nagaland
- Ethnicity: Poumai Naga
- Native speakers: 140,000 (2011)
- Language family: Sino-Tibetan: Angami-Pochuri; Angami; Poula

Language codes
- ISO 639-3: pmx
- Glottolog: poum1235

Poula is an Angami-Pochuri language that is predominantly spoken by the Poumai Naga people in Senapati district in Manipur and Phek district in Nagaland, India. The language of Chingjaroi is also closely related to Poula but is distinct. A descriptive grammar of Poula is available.

== Grammar ==
=== Phonology ===
The phonology of Poula lacks syllable codas and also disallows consonant clusters in onset position. There are 25 consonant phonemes in Poula.

=== Consonants ===
Consonants
		Labial	Alveolar	Palatal	Velar	Glottal
Plosive	voiceless	p	t	c	k	
Plosive	voiced	pʰ	tʰ	cʰ	kʰ	
Plosive	aspirated	b	d		g	
Nasal	plain	m	n		ŋ	
Nasal	aspirated				ŋ̊ʰ	
Fricative	voiceless		s	ɕ		h
Fricative	voiced			ʑ		
Affricate	voiceless			tɕ		
Affricate	voiced			dʑ		
Approximant		ʋ		j		
Liquid	rhotic		ɾ			
Liquid	lateral		l			

=== Vowels ===
There are six vowel phonemes in Poula.

	Front	Central	Back
High	i y		(u)
Mid	e	ə	o
Low		a	

In Poula, the phoneme /ə/ is written with the grapheme 'ü' (now, many use it as 'ii') in Bible and Hymns which was devised by Bible Society of India. In addition Poula lacks high back round vowel [u] as a monophthong, but [u] is present in nexus of diphthong; for example pou [pəu] `father'.

=== Tones ===
Poula is a tonal language, however tone is not currently marked in the orthography. There are four tonemes in Poula.

Word	Tone	Gloss
/na˥/	High-falling	'baby'
/na˦/	Mid-Rising	'later'
/na˧/	Mid	'things'
/na˩/	Low	'paint'

Poula is an innovative language–unlike Kuki-Chin languages–for having simple morphology.

=== Morphology ===
Nouns and verbs are the two content word classes. There are no ‘adjective’ and ‘adverbs’ words classes, however nominalized verbs may modify nouns and non-finite converbial verbs may modify verbs. There several functional words found.
