= Poumai people =

Tibeto-Burman ethnic group in Manipur and Nagaland, Northeast India

Poumai people Poumai Naga people
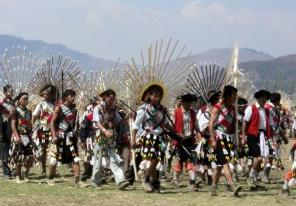
- Glory Day celebration of the Poumai Naga

Total population
- 187,180 (2011 census)

Regions with significant populations
- Manipur: 179,189
- Nagaland: 6000-10,000

Languages
- Poula

Religion
- Predominantly Christianity

Related ethnic groups
- Tenyimi (Angami Naga · Chakhesang Naga · Mao Naga · Maram Naga · Rengma Naga · Zeme Naga)

The Poumai people, also known as the Poumai Naga, are a Tibeto-Burman ethnic group that inhabit the Northeast Indian states of Manipur and Nagaland. The Poumai predominantly live in the Senapati District of Manipur, though there are villages in Nagaland state and one in Ukhrul district. The Poumai mainly live in 100 villages that have been broadly divided into three blocks: Paomata, Lepaona and Chilivai. The Poumai speak their own language, Poula, and are generally Christian.
