= List of traditional Naga festivals =

The various Naga ethnic groups have their own distinct festivals.

== List ==
The group-specific festivals are:

Festival	Ethnic group	Time
Aoleang	Konyak	April (first week)
Chagaa, Gaan-Ngai, Hega n'gi, Mlei-Ngyi	Zeliangrong Communities - (Liangmei, Rongmei, and Zeme)	December (last week), 10 March for Melei-Ngyi
Chavan Kumhrin	Anāl	October (23)
Chiithuni	Mao	January (7)
Kaīvi	Lainong	January/March
Luira Phanit	Tangkhul	February/March
Metümnyo	Yimkhiung	August (second week)
Miu	Khiamniungan	May (second week)
Moatsü	Ao	May (first week)
Mungmung	Sangtam	September (first week)
Monyü	Phom	April (first week)
Naknyulüm	Chang	July (second week)
Ngada	Rengma	November (last week)
Sekrenyi, Te–l Khukhu	Angami	February, July
Sükhrünyie, Tsükhenyie	Chakhesang	January & March/April
Thounii	Poumai	January (18 to 22)
Tokhü Emong	Lotha	November (first week)
Tülüni, Ahuna	Sümi	July
Yemshi	Pochury	September/October

=== Inter–ethnic festivals ===
To promote inter-group interaction, the Government of Nagaland has organized the annual Hornbill Festival since 2000. Other inter-tribe festivals are Lui Ngai Ni and Naga New Year Festival.

Festival	Ethnic group	Time
Hornbill Festival	Nagas of Nagaland	December (1–10)
Lui Ngai Ni	Nagas of Manipur	February (14–15)
Naga New Year Festival	Nagas of Myanmar	January (mid)

== See also ==
- List of traditional Naga games and sports
