= Naga people =

Naga
Total population
- c. 2,900,000+

Regions with significant populations
- India: 2.5 million+
- Nagaland: 1,600,000+
- Manipur: 650,000+
- Arunachal Pradesh: 150,000+
- Assam: 40,000+
- Meghalaya: 2,556
- Mizoram: 760
- Myanmar: 300,000
- Naga SAZ: 120,000+
- Sagaing Division: N/A
- Kachin State: N/A

Languages
- Naga, Northern Naga, Nagamese Creole, English, Burmese

Religion
- Majority – Christianity (Predominantly Baptist), Minority – Buddhism, Hinduism, Animism (including Heraka, Krüna/Pfütsana, Rangfrah and Tingkao Ragwang Chapriak)

Related ethnic groups
- Other Kachin and Shan ethnicities; Jingpo · Naxi · Yi · Shan · Wa · Lisu · Chin

Nagas are a Tibeto-Burman ethnic group native to northeastern India and northwestern Myanmar. The groups have similar cultures and traditions, and form the majority of population in the Indian state of Nagaland and Naga Self-Administered Zone of Myanmar (Burma); with significant populations in Manipur, Arunachal Pradesh and Assam in India, and Sagaing Region and Kachin State in Myanmar.

The Nagas are divided into various Naga tribes whose numbers and populations are unclear. They each speak distinct Naga languages often unintelligible to the others, but all are loosely connected to each other.

== Etymology ==
The present day Naga people have historically been referred to by many names, like "Noga" or "Naka" by the inhabitants of Assam which means "people with pierced ears", "Hao" by Meitei people of Imphal Valley and "Nakas" by Burmese of what is now considered as Myanmar. However, over time "Naga" became the commonly accepted nomenclature, and was also used by the British. According to the Burma Gazetteer, the term 'Naga' is of doubtful origin and is used to describe hill tribes that occupy the country between the Chins in the south and Kachins (Singphos) in the Northeast.

== History ==
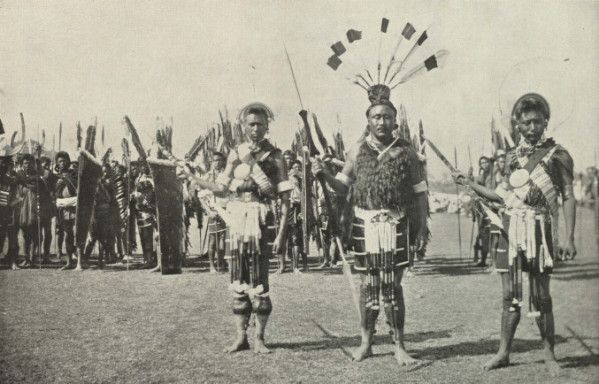
Naga tribemen wearing warpaint c. 1905

Aside from developing contacts with the Ahom kingdom. During the 19th century, the British attempted to subjugate the Naga tribes and abolish traditional Naga practices such as headhunting and intertribal violence. After India became independent from British rule in 1947, the Naga became Indian citizens, though an ongoing ethnic conflict has existed in the region since 1958.

=== Mongkawng ===
According to the Burmese chronicles Tagung Yazawin, the first Chaopha of Mongkawng Samlongpha with the main town in Mogaung captured Naga country in the mid 1300s. In the chronicle Naga country is named as "Khang Se".

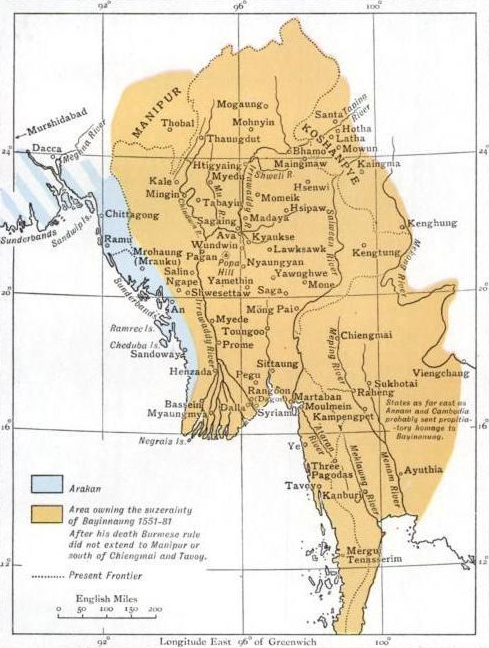
Mongkawng in North in 1572

=== Kingdom of Ava ===
In Yan-aung-myin Pagoda inscription found in Pinya of Myanmar mentions that the Kingdom of Ava under Minkhaung I (1400–1421) in the early 1400s extended till the territories of the Nagas.

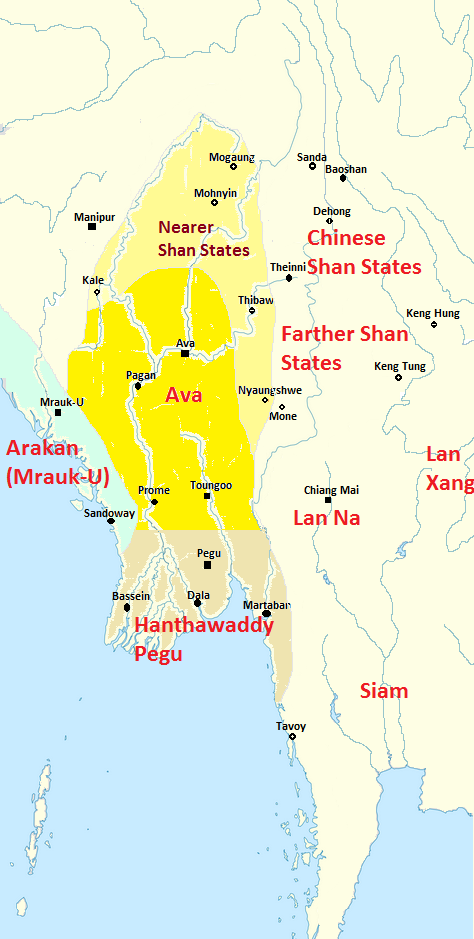
Ava kingdom in 1450

== Culture ==
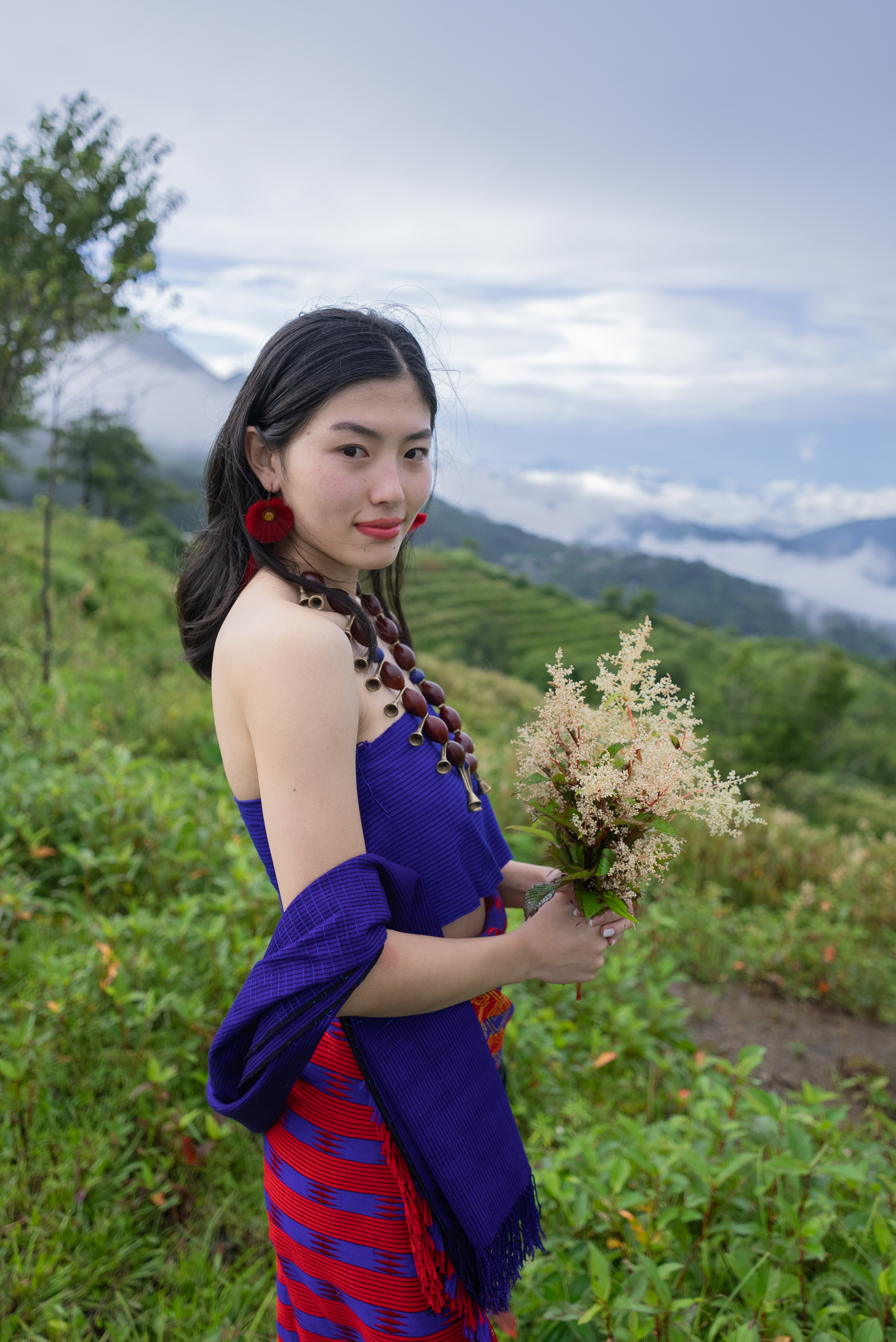
Ao Naga girl in her traditional attire

=== Art ===
The Naga people love colour, as is evident in the shawls designed and woven by women, and in the headgear that both sexes design. Clothing patterns are traditional to each group, and the cloths are woven by the women. They use beads in variety, profusion and complexity in their jewellery, along with a wide range of materials including glass, shell, stone, teeth or tusk, claws, horns, metal, bone, wood, seeds, hair, and fibre.

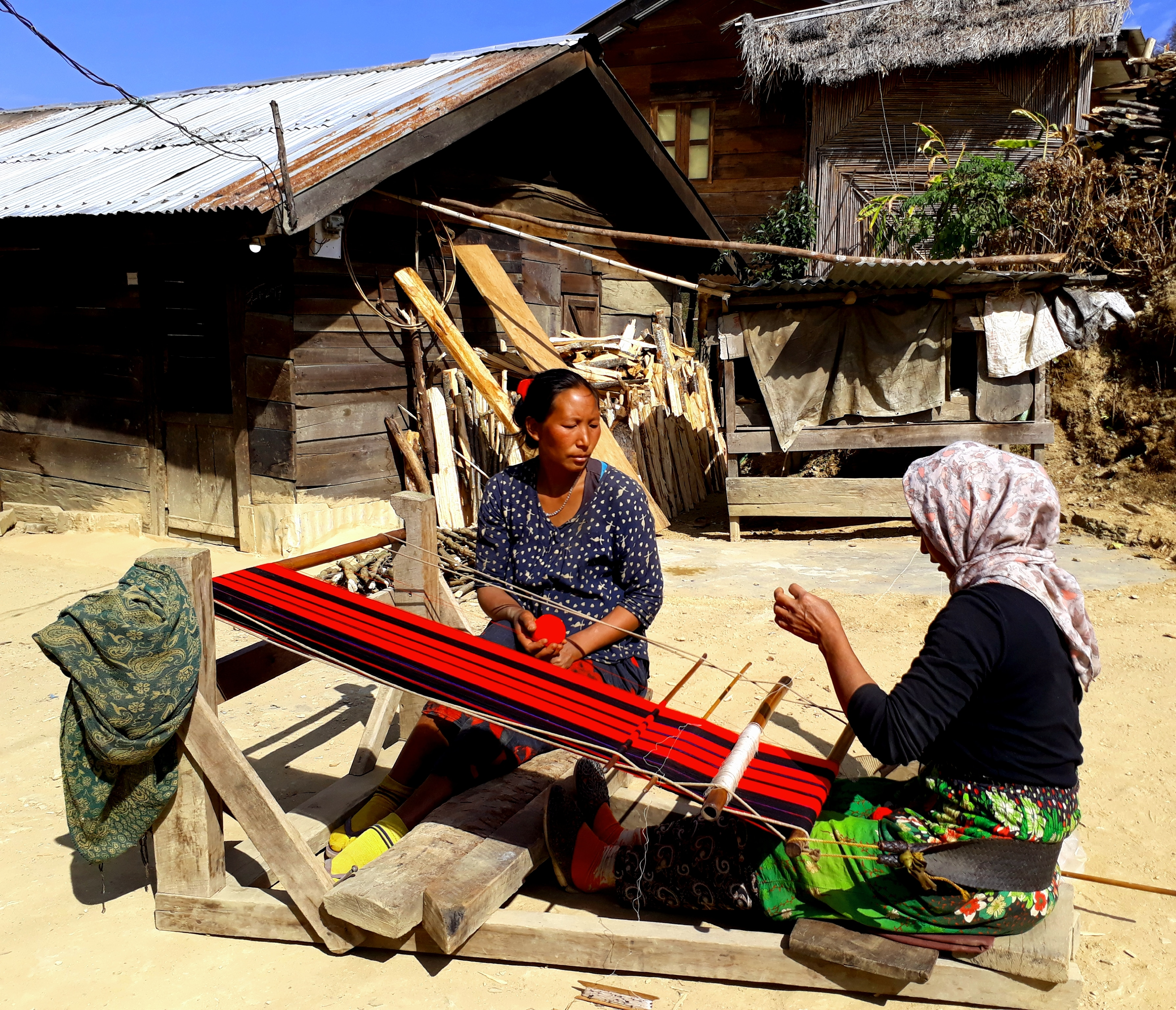
Two Yimkhiung Naga women weaving traditional shawl

According to Dr. Verrier Elwin, these groups made all the goods they used, as was once common in many traditional societies:

they have made their own cloth, their own hats and rain-coats; they have prepared their own medicines, their own cooking-vessels, their own substitutes for crockery.

Craftwork includes the making of baskets, weaving of cloth, wood carving, pottery, metalwork, jewellery-making and bead-work.

Weaving of colourful woolen and cotton shawls is a central activity for women of all Nagas. One of the common features of Naga shawls is that three pieces are woven separately and stitched together. Weaving is an intricate and time-consuming work and each shawl takes at least a few days to complete. Designs for shawls and wraparound garments (commonly called mekhala) are different for men and women.

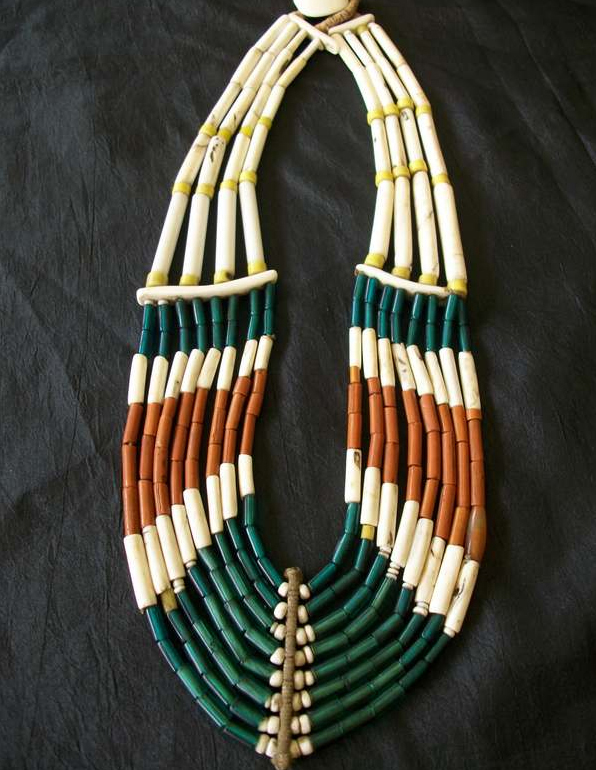
Ancestral Naga Beads, Courtesy Wovensouls Collection

Among many groups the design of the shawl denotes the social status of the wearer. Some of the more known shawls include Tsüngkotepsü and Rongsü of the Aos; Sütam, Ethasü, Longpensü of the Lothas; Süpong of the Sangtams, Rongkhim and Tsüngrem Khim of the Yimkhiungs; and the Angami Lohe shawls with thick embroidered animal motifs.

Naga jewellery is an equally important part of identity, with the entire community wearing similar bead jewellery, specifically the necklace.

The Indian Chamber of Commerce has filed an application seeking registration of traditional Naga shawls made in Nagaland with the Geographical Registry of India for Geographical Indication.

=== Cuisine ===
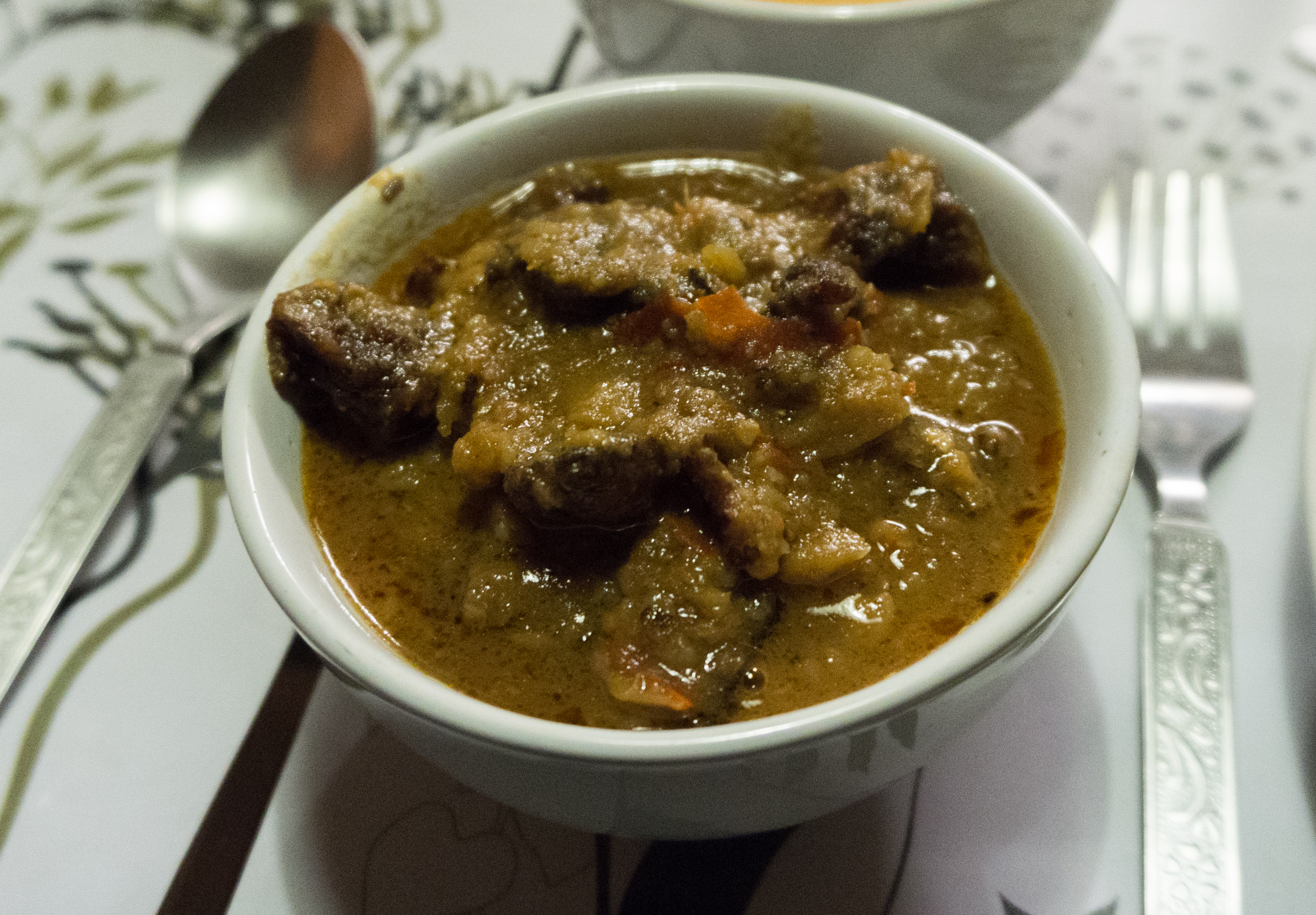
Smoked pork with akhuni, a fermented soybean product

Naga cuisine is characterised by smoked and fermented foods.

=== Folk song and dance ===
Folk songs and dances are essential ingredients of the traditional Naga culture. The oral tradition is kept alive through the media of folk tales and songs. Naga folk songs are both romantic and historical, with songs narrating entire stories of famous ancestors and incidents. Seasonal songs describe activities done in a particular agricultural cycle. The early Western missionaries opposed the use of folk songs by Naga Christians as they were perceived to be associated with spirit worship, war, and immorality. As a result, translated versions of Western hymns were introduced, leading to the slow disappearance of indigenous music from the Naga hills.

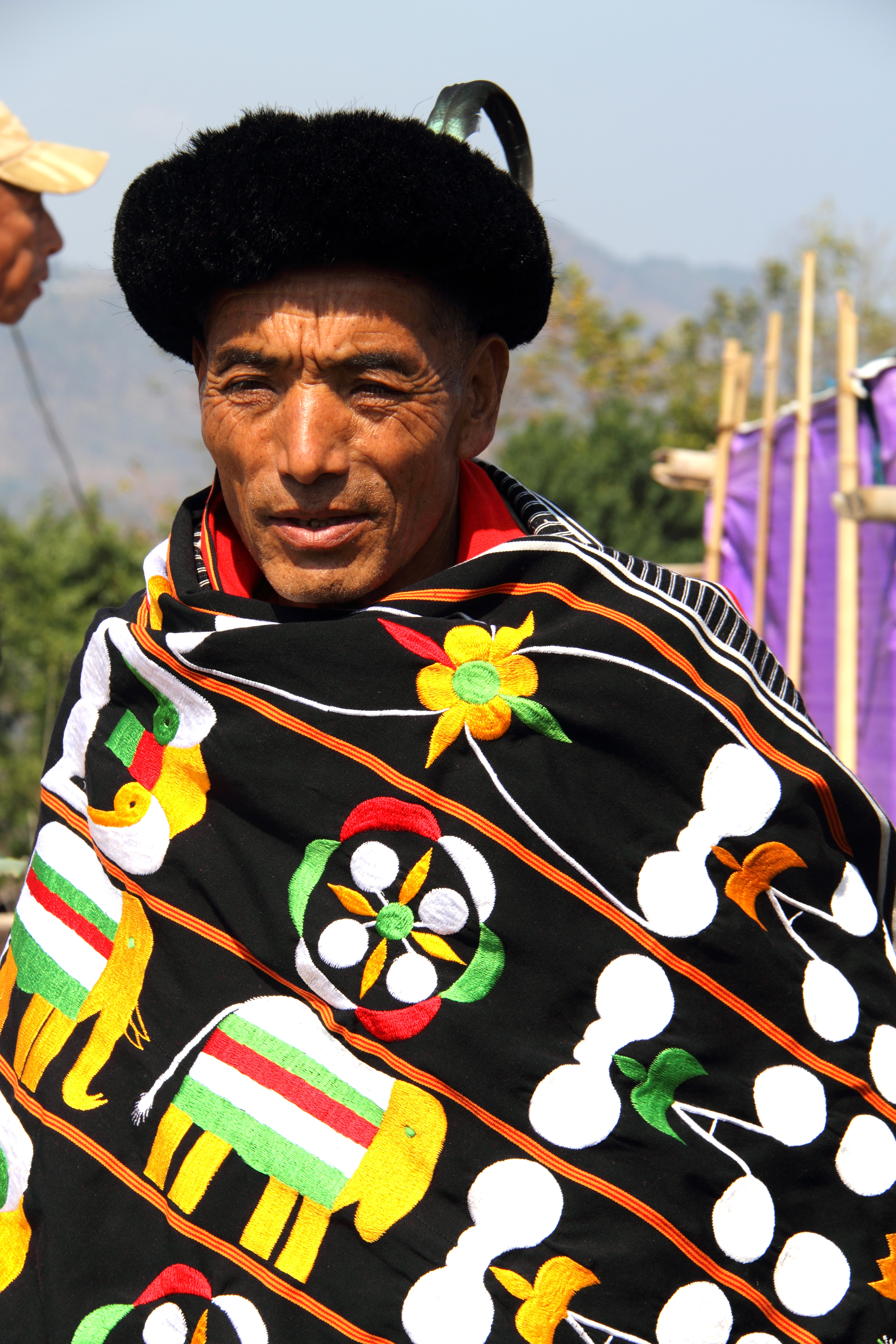
A Chakhesang Naga man

Folk dances of the Nagas are mostly performed in groups in synchronised fashion, by both men and women, depending on the type of dance. Dances are usually performed at festivals and religious occasions. War dances are performed mostly by men and are athletic and martial in style. All dances are accompanied by songs and war cries by the dancers. Indigenous musical instruments made and used by the people are tati, bamboo mouth organs, bamboo flutes, trumpets, drums made of cattle skin and log drums.

=== Religion ===
==== Christianity ====
Traditionally, the Nagas practised animism, venerating natural elements such as the sun, moon, trees, and stones. They believed in a Supreme Being and various lesser spirits associated with nature, conducting rituals and sacrifices to appease these entities. This deep connection to nature was central to their worldview and daily life.

In the mid-19th century, Christian missionaries, particularly from the American Baptist denomination, introduced Christianity to the Naga hills. The Nagas embraced the new faith, leading to a significant religious transformation. Today, Christianity is the predominant religion among the Naga people, with over 87% identifying as Christians, making Nagaland one of the three Christian-majority states in India.

While Christianity dominates, remnants of traditional beliefs persist, especially in cultural practices and festivals. Some Nagas integrate indigenous rituals with Christian practices, reflecting a syncretic approach to spirituality. Additionally, there are small minorities practising other religions (such as Buddhism), but they constitute a very limited portion of the population. In Myanmar, the term "Naga" holds significance in Buddhist mythology, referring to serpent-like beings often depicted in religious art and architecture.

==== Hinduism ====
According to 2011 census of India, 5,176 people in the state follow Hinduism.

=== Festivals ===
The various Naga groups have their own distinct festivals. To promote inter-group interaction, the Government of Nagaland has organised the annual Hornbill Festival since 2000. Another inter-ethnic festival is Lui Ngai Ni. The group-specific festivals include:

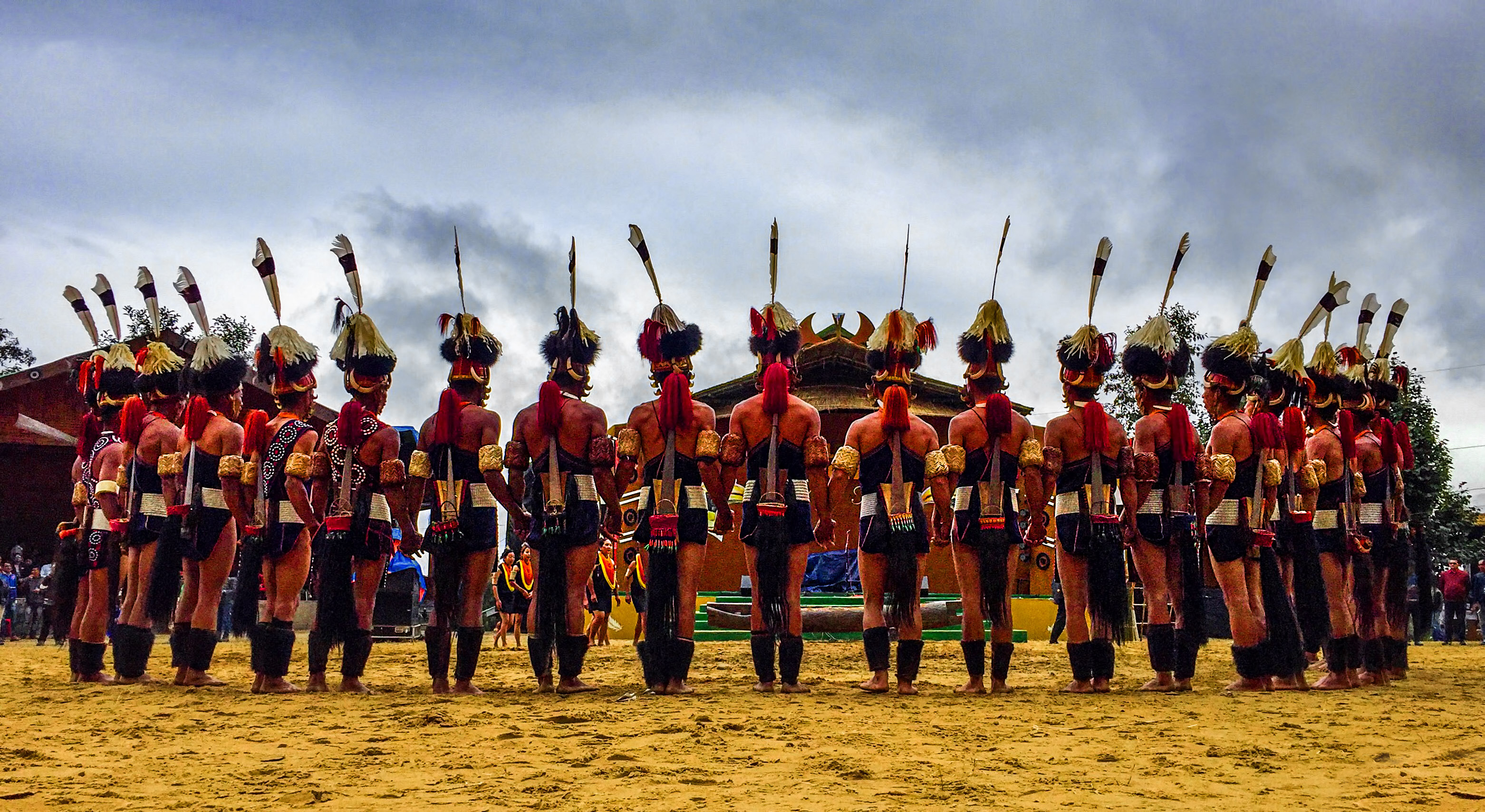
Hornbill Festival

| Festival | Ethnic group | Time | Major centre |
|---|---|---|---|
| Aoleang | Konyak | April (first week) | Mon |
| Chaga Ngee, Gaan-Ngai, Hega n'gi, Mlei-Ngyi | Zeliangrong Communities – (Liangmai, Rongmei, and Zeme) | December (last week), 10 March for Melei-Ngyi, 30 October for Chaga Ngee | Tamenglong–Cachar, Peren |
| Chavan Kumhrin | Anāl | October (23) | Chandel |
| Chiithuni | Mao | January (7) | Senapati |
| Kaīvi | Lainong | January/March | Lahe |
| Luira Phanit | Tangkhul | February/March | Ukhrul |
| Metümnyo | Yimkhiung | August (second week) | Shamator |
| Miu | Khiamniungan | May (second week) | Noklak |
| Moatsü | Ao | May (first week) | Mokokchung |
| Mungmung | Sangtam | September (first week) | Kiphire and Tuensang |
| Monyü | Phom | April (first week) | Longleng |
| Naknyulüm | Chang | July (second week) | Tuensang |
| Ngada | Rengma | November (last week) | Tseminyü |
| Sekrenyi | Angami | February | Kohima, Chümoukedima |
| Sükhrünyie, Tsükhenyie | Chakhesang | January & March/April | Phek |
| Thounii | Poumai | January (18th to 22nd) | Senapati |
| Tokhü Emong | Lotha | November (first week) | Wokha |
| Tülüni, Ahuna | Sümi | July | Zünheboto |
| Yemshi | Pochury | September/October | Phek |

== Ethnic groups ==
The word Naga originated as an exonym. Today, it covers a number of ethnic groups that reside in Nagaland, Manipur, Assam and Arunachal Pradesh states of India, and also in Myanmar.

Before the arrival of the British, the term "Naga" was used by Assamese to refer to certain isolated ethnic groups. The British adopted this term for a number of ethnic groups in the surrounding area, based on loose linguistic and cultural associations. The number of groups classified as "Naga" grew significantly in the 20th century: as of December 2015, 89 groups are classified as Naga by the various sources. This expansion in the "Naga" identity has been due to a number of factors including the quest for upward mobility in the society of Nagaland, and the desire to establish a common purpose of resistance against dominance by other groups. In this way, the "Naga" identity has not always been fixed.

=== Nagas in India ===
Nagas population are spread across all Northeast Indian States except Tripura and are listed as scheduled tribes in 6 Northeastern States: Arunachal Pradesh, Assam, Manipur, Meghalaya, Mizoram and Nagaland.

=== Nagas in Myanmar ===
Nagas in Myanmar are mostly found in Sagaing Division and Kachin state. The Naga territory in Myanmar is marked by Kabaw valley in the south bordering to the Chin state, the Kachin on the north and the Burmese on the east.

Major Naga ethnic groups in Myanmar:

1. Konyak (Chen)
2. Lainong (Htangan)
3. Makury
4. Nokko (Khiamniungan)
5. Para
6. Somra Tangkhul
7. Tangshang

Some other minor Naga groups are Anāl, Lamkang, Moyon, Koka (sometimes spelt as Goga or Koki), Longphuri, Paung Nyuan (Makhyam), etc.

Townships inhabited by Nagas:

1. Homalin
2. Lahe with Tanbakwe sub-township
3. Layshi with Mowailut sub-township and Somra sub-township
4. Hkamti
5. Nanyun with Pangsau and Dunghi sub-township
6. Tamu of Sagaing Division and
7. Tanai of Kachin state

Anāl and Moyon are mainly found in Tamu township on the south and a few Somra Nagas are also found in and around Tamu bordering to Layshi jurisdiction. Makury, Para and Somra tribes are mainly found in Layshi township. Makury Nagas and a few Somra Nagas are also found in Homalin township. Lahe is highly populated by Konyak, Nokko, Lainong and Makury tribes. Nanyun on the north is the home of Tangshang tribe which comprises more than 54 sub-dialect groups. Homlin township is highly populated by the considered lost tribes (Red Shans). But Kukis, Burmese, Chinese and Indians are also found there. Hkamti township is populated altogether by all the Naga tribes majority and with a number of Burmese, Shans, Chinese and Indians. Tanai in Kachin state of Myanmar is inhabited by the Tangshang Nagas among the Kachin people.

== Languages ==
The Naga languages are either classified under the Chin-Naga languages or the Sal languages.

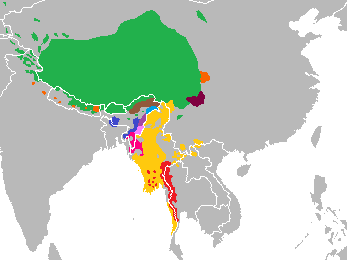
Language groups in northeast India.: Tibetan; Burmese; Karen; Rung; Tani; Qiang; Bodo-Garo; Konyak; Naga; Metei; Kuki-Chin

Nagas have more language diversity than any other ethnic group or states in India. Naga people speak over 89 languages and dialects, mostly unintelligible with each other. However, there are many similarities among the languages spoken by them. The diversity of languages and traditions of the Nagas results most likely from the multiple cultural absorptions that occurred during their successive migrations. According to legend, before settling in the region, these groups moved over vast zones, and in the process, some clans were absorbed into one or more other groups. Therefore, until recent times, absorptions were a source of many interclan conflicts.

In 1967, the Nagaland Assembly proclaimed English as the official language of Nagaland and it is the medium for education in Nagaland. Other than English, Nagamese, a creole language form of the Assamese language, is a widely spoken language. Every community has its own mother tongue but communicates with other communities in either Nagamese or English. However, English is the predominant spoken and written language in Nagaland. Hindi is also taught along with English in most schools and most Nagas prefer to use Hindi to communicate with the migrant workers of the state, that primarily comes from Bihar, UP and Madhya Pradesh. Since 2022, Hindi in Northeastern India has been taught in school until class 10.

== See also ==
- List of Naga people
- Naga Hoho

== Novels ==
- Ben Doherty, Nagaland, Wild Dingo Press, Melbourne, 2018, ISBN 978-0-6480-6637-8.
