= Aki Kiti =

Combat sport of Nagaland

- Also known as: Akikiti, Sümi kick fighting
- Focus: Kicking, blocking
- Hardness: Semi-contact
- Country of origin: India
- Creator: Sümi Naga people
- Olympic sport: No
- Meaning: Kick fighting

Aki Kiti is a semi-contact combat sport involving kicking and blocking with soles. It is a traditional sport originating from the headhunting Sümi Naga tribe of Nagaland, India. Played inside a circular ring on ground, it is normally played between two fighters. The objective is to make the opponent fall on knee or touch ground with hands or step outside of playing zone.

== History ==
Aki Kiti originated as a sport among the headhunter Sümi Naga tribe (now Christian converts) of Nagaland in the mountainous Northeast India. Originally, it was intended solely as a sporting event that served the purpose of righting wrongs, restoring honour, or "settling scores" between tribes and tribesmen without resorting to violence. It was practiced during tribal ceremonies. Aki Kiti is described in the book The Sema Nagas by anthropologist John Henry Hutton, published in 1922. Aki Kiti means "kick fighting".

== Sport ==
In Aki Kiti, only the sole of the feet can be used, to strike and block the opponent. It is played inside a ring drawn on the ground. The objective of the semi-contact game is to either make the opponent fell in his knee or throw him out of the ring. Front kicks or leaping front kicks are directed to the waist, sides or chest of the opponent. No particular training syllabus exists for the sport, any exercises that can help gain stamina, strength, and flexibility for the fighters are part of the training regime. Usually it is a two-person game, but an expert can challenge two juniors if wanted. The rule forbids kicking the opponent after he is down. Game can also be lost by touching the ground even with a finger.

== Modern-day practice ==
Aphuyemi Akikiti Association was formed in 2014 for promoting and with the intention of reviving the art. They categorised the game as athletics. Since then, Aki Kiti has been competed annually at the Thuwuni Akikiti Championship held at the annual Thuwuni Festival at Pughoboto in November. It is played for three to four minutes with three rounds. Using hand is a foul. In 2018, the association demonstrated Aki Kiti at the Hornbill Festival in Kisama Heritage Village.

== In the media ==
In 2008, it was featured in the fourth episode in Series 1 of BBC Three reality TV show Last Man Standing. In the episode titled Sumi Kick Fighting, six athletes from the United Kingdom and United States competed against tribal champions to become the last man standing.

== See also ==
- Kick boxing
- List of traditional Naga games and sports
- Taekkyon
- Taekwondo
