= Kene (Naga wrestling) =

Traditional wrestling of the Nagas

- Also known as: Künü; Afaii mai
- Focus: Grappling
- Hardness: Full-contact
- Creator: Unknown
- Parenthood: Historical

Kene (/kɛnɛ/ kɛ-nɛ) or Naga wrestling is a folk wrestling style and traditional sport of the Nagas. The objective of the sport is to bring any part of the opponent's body above the knee to the ground.

Kene is played by the Tenyi–mi ethnic group of the Nagas—Angami, Chakhesang and Zeliangrong of Nagaland & Mao, Maram and Poumai of Manipur.

Each wrestler wears a coloured cloth tied around the waist. Holding the opponent's waist-binder with both hands, the wrestler must attempt to topple the other onto the ground.

== History ==
Kene is one of the oldest traditional games of the Nagas. Though this style of wrestling has been practiced in the region for several centuries, the modern version of the sport was developed only in the mid 20th century.

The construction of the highway between Kohima and Imphal in the 1930s and 1940s brought together many Tenyimi villagers to participate in the road construction to earn some cash as it was a burden to pay house tax to the British regime as cash was scarce at that time. During lunch breaks, wrestling matches would be held among the workers. Each respective village leaders chooses its best wrestlers to participate in the matches.

In 1965, the first organised wrestling meet was initiated by the Federal Government of Nagaland. It was later reinforced with the formation of the Naga Wrestling Board in 1969 and under its aegis the first Naga Wrestling Championship was held on 20 May 1971.

== Match ==
Traditionally, the match takes place within a circular ring, filled with mounded dirt. Modern matches are held in a wrestling ring. Contestants wears a towel or a belt around their waist which is used for takedowns.

At the start of the match both the contestants holds each other in a grappling position, in which each wrestler is grabbing the other's by their belt. The fight begins with the referee's whistle who works within the ring to judge and control the conduct of the wrestlers, rule on their ability to wrestler safely, count knocked-down wrestlers, and rule on fouls.

A single match is contested in a best of three fights format, in which the wrestler to win two fights first wins the match. There are no weight classifications.

== Competition ==
=== Naga Wrestling Championship ===
The Naga Wrestling Championship organized by the Nagaland Wrestling Association is held biennially but only the Angamis, Chakhesangs and Zeliangs are affiliated to the NWA because the Nagas of Manipur were restricted to participate in the tournament by the Government of Manipur. Kezhaseluo-o Pienyü emerged as the champion of the 30th Naga Wrestling Championship 2022.

=== Naga Open Wrestling Championship ===
The Naga Open Wrestling Championship is held biennially since 1997. Under this anyone from the non-affiliated members of the Nagaland Wrestling Association can participate. Venüzo Dawhuo holds the title of the 13th Naga Open Wrestling Championship 2021.

=== Hornbill International Wrestling Championship ===
Hornbill International Wrestling Championship is held annually since 2007 organized by the Nagaland Wrestling Association as part of the Hornbill Festival celebrations. Vekütho Soho holds the title of the 13th Hornbill International Wrestling Championship 2019.

== See also ==
- Alysh
- List of traditional Naga games and sports
- Mongolian wrestling
- Ssireum
