= Nagaland Wrestling Association =

Non-governmental sports organisation

- Abbreviation: NWA
- Formation: 1971; 55 years ago
- Type: Sports federation
- Headquarters: Kohima, Nagaland, India
- Members: 3 active members
- Official language: English, and the affiliated member's language when necessary
- President: Vivolie Kezo
- Motto: Good Wrestling Encompasses Brain & Brawn

The Nagaland Wrestling Association (NWA) is a non-governmental sports organisation based in Kohima, Nagaland, India. Founded in 1971, it is the apex body responsible for organising the Naga Wrestling Championship, the biggest sport event in Nagaland and the Naga Open Wrestling Championship.

There are 3 affiliated members of the NWA—the Angami Wrestling Association, the Chakhesang Wrestling Association and the Zeliang Wrestling Association. The current president of the Nagaland Wrestling Association is Vivolie Kezo.

== See also ==
- Kene (Naga wrestling)
