= Trobriand cricket =

Bat-and-ball game in Papua New Guinea

Trobriand cricket refers to a unique version of the bat-and-ball sport cricket played by the Trobriand Islanders. They were first exposed to the game by Christian missionaries, who thought the game would discourage war among the natives. However, the game was quickly adapted to Trobriand culture by expanding the number of players, adding dances and chanting, and modifying the bats and balls. Since war between groups on the island was banned, cricket began to incorporate many of the traditional practices associated with war for the Trobriand people. The game also reflects the objects of powers introduced to the islands by its British colonizers and American troops during World War II.

== Historical background ==
Cricket was introduced to the Trobriand Islands in 1903 by the British Methodist missionary William Gillmore, who hoped to reduce tribal rivalry and fighting. The modern-day version is very different from the game introduced by Gillmore, as new rules and traditions have been integrated.

== Anthropological analysis ==
In the Trobriand Islands, kayasa is a form of obligatory, competitive activity done traditionally in the form of ritual warfare. Warfare with spears was replaced by cricket, as a peaceful way of continuing kayasa.

Trobriand cricket has been altered such that the home team is always the winner. There are no restrictions on the number of players on a team; thus, a team can have as many as 40 or 50 players.

Before the match, the ball and bats are given to a local spiritual leader who blesses the equipment for good luck. Also, this leader works on ensuring good weather. Before the match, each team practices chants and dances to be performed at various times throughout the game. Each out is followed by a celebratory dance, choreographed by the opposing team. These dances often have special meaning, commenting on the prowess of the team, their superior skills, or mocking the other team. These dances may also have sexual innuendos and erotic themes.

Bowling is done underarm (as in softball), rather than overarm as in international cricket. This change came about because underhanded-bowled balls are less painful if they contact with a player.

There are ritual entrance and exit dances. One team had a mascot dressed as a tourist (dressed in bright colors, stopping in front of the performances to get a “close-up” view with his pretend binoculars). At the end of the match, there is an exchange of food, with the home team putting on the feast.

Other Trobriand changes to cricket include the following:

- The visiting team bats first
- The bat and ball are not regular
- Teams bowl alternately from each end of the pitch
- Scoring varies considerably—for example, six runs are scored by a lost ball or by hitting the ball over a tree (compared to the standard boundary rules)
- The umpire is from the batting side, and when sides change the umpire does as well
- Rather than with the awarding of trophies, games conclude with a feast put on by the home team.

Today, cricket holds special meaning for the local population of the Trobriands. It has evolved to take on warlike aspects. For example, players’ bodies are decorated in bright colors and designs, similar to those displayed by warriors. The field entry and exit dances take on a warlike formation.

Trobriand cricket is an example of syncretism. Usually, syncretic cultures or traditions take elements from both the existing, “traditional” culture and elements from “outsiders” such as colonists, occupiers, or missionaries.

== In popular culture ==
Trobriand cricket was featured in an episode of the 2007 BBC series Last Man Standing.

== See also ==
- Kilikiti
