= Naga Wrestling Championship =

Wrestling tournament in Nagaland, India

- Sport: Wrestling
- Founded: 1971
- Founder: Nagaland Wrestling Association
- Country: India
- Headquarters: Kohima, Nagaland
- Venues: Khuochiezie, Kohima
- Most recent champion: Kezhaseluo-o Pienyü

The Naga Wrestling Championship is a wrestling tournament organized by the Nagaland Wrestling Association. Initially held as an annual event, it has now been held biennially since 1974 and is the biggest sport event in Nagaland, India.

Kezhaseluo-o Pienyü emerged as the champion of the 29th Edition of the Naga Wrestling Championship held on 7 March 2026.

== Champions ==
Edition	Year	Winner(s)	Note	Ref.
30th	2026	Kezhaseluo-o Pienyü		
29th	2024	Kezhaseluo-o Pienyü		
28th	2022	Venüzo Dawhuo		
27th	2020	Venüzo Dawhuo		
26th	2018	Menuosetuo Yiese		
25th	2016	Vechita Khesoh		
24th	2014	Atoto Kere		
23rd	2012	Kezhalelie Keretsü		
22nd	2010	Megosier Khate		
21st	2008	Vekhriyi Chüzho		
20th	2006	Neibu Rio		
19th	2004	Hüvesü Puro		
18th	2002	Hüvesü Puro		
17th	2000	Phuluveyi		
16th	1998	Tsahüyo Thira		
15th	1996	Hükhoneyi Soho		
14th	1994	Lhüvenü Phesao		
13th	1992	Vedeta Nienü		
12th	1990	Potsütso Thira		
11th	1988	Hükhoneyi Soho		
10th	1986	Visüto Yore		
9th	1984	Chisazo Dawhuo		
8th	1982	Chisazo Dawhuo & Vinocho	Joint Championship	
7th	1980	Kechakietuo Pier		
6th	1978	Vemürha Getsa		
5th	1976	Vecühü Theluo		
4th	1974	Thepukroyi Phesao		
3rd	1973	Lhulawhezo Punyü		
2nd	1972	Velahü Puro		
1st	1971	N/A	No Individual Championship	

== See also ==
- Kene (Naga wrestling)
