= Last Man Standing (British TV series) =

- Also known as: Last One Standing; Six Versus the World; Last Woman Standing
- Starring: see Contestants: Series 1 Series 2 Last Woman Standing
- Narrated by: Richard Hammond; Ralf Little
- Composer: Ty Unwin
- Country of origin: United Kingdom
- No. of series: 3
- No. of episodes: Series 1: 8 (12 in US); Series 2: 10; Last Woman Standing: 6

Production
- Running time: 60 minutes
- Production companies: Gallowgate Productions; BBC/Discovery Channel

Original release
- Network: BBC Three
- Release: 26 June 2007 – 16 December 2008

Last Man Standing and latterly Last Woman Standing (known in the United States as Last One Standing and also known by the Discovery Channel title of Six Versus the World) is a BBC reality TV show that was first aired on 26 June 2007. Each series featured a group of athletic individuals travelling around the globe to take part in different tribal or traditional sports. Whoever physically outperforms the rest in the most challenges is declared the winner.

Series 1 was narrated by Richard Hammond, with series 2 being narrated by Ralf Little.

First Last Man Standing: Jason Bennett from the United States

Second Last Man Standing: Wolé Adesemoye from the United Kingdom

The Last Woman Standing: Anna Campbell from Lamu, Kenya

== Format ==
Each episode begins with the contestants being introduced to a new indigenous society, meeting the local elder or head man. The contestants are introduced to the sport they will be competing in. They must board and eat with the villagers, and help out with village chores while being trained by the villagers, both for general fitness, and in techniques required for the particular sport. Competitors often undertake local rituals or traditions, such as ceremonial dancing, the wearing of tribal clothing, body painting, medicinal treatments, ritual tests of strength or courage, and the offering up of prayers or offerings to local gods or spirits.

Contestants are usually split into two camps within the village, with two trainers. Contestants then train against local villagers. Some episodes feature an initial elimination stage, whereby only the contestants who have sufficiently impressed their trainer are allowed to actually compete in the sport proper, usually a local showpiece event or competition, a regional competition, or a contest against a neighbouring village.

For certain sports, the contestants were split into weight categories, such as wrestling. In the final competition phase, the winner for that week is the contestant who performed the best in the actual competition format, usually either progressing furthest in an individual knockout contest, winning a race, or scoring the most individually in a team sport such as Trobriand Cricket. Any draws are then settled with a vote by the local trainers.

== Series one ==
The first series of the programme consisted of eight episodes produced by the BBC and premiered in the UK on BBC Three from 26 June to 14 August 2007. It was later shown on the more mainstream BBC Two from 2 March to 26 April 2008. Also, that season was translated in French and aired in Québec, Canada as Le Dernier Combattant (The Last Fighter) on Canal D. The Discovery Channel showed the programme as Last One Standing, starting on 4 October 2007. Discovery produced an extra four episodes for the American run (Kraho Log Running, Andean Ice Race, Java Martial Arts, and Vanuatu Canoe Race). All twelve episodes have run on BBC America as Last Man Standing but the four Discovery-produced episodes have not yet been shown in the UK. Despite this, both series had the same winner: With Brad, Jason and Rajko tied for first place (with 2 wins each in the UK version and 3 wins each in the US version), the competitors vote for Jason as the overall winner.

=== Contestants ===
Name	From	Discipline	Events won (UK Series)	Events won (US Series)
Bradley Johnson	Oklahoma	Strongman	2	3
Corey Rennell	Alaska	Outdoorsman	0	0
Jason Bennett	Florida	BMX racer and Tree surgeon	2	3
Mark Hoban	Birmingham	Kickboxing and Salsa Dance	1	1
Rajko Radovic	Middlesex	Fitness Guru	2	3
Richard Massey	Oxford	Cricket and Rugby	1	2

=== Episodes ===
- Week 1: Kalapalo Wrestling – Brazil

Winner: Brad

- Week 2: Zulu Stick Fighting – South Africa

Winner: Mark

- Week 3: Tarahumara Endurance Running – Mexico

Winner: Rajko

- Week 4: Sümi Kick Fighting – India

Winner: Jason

- Week 5: Mongolian wrestling – Mongolia

Winner: Brad

- Week 6: Trobriand Cricket – Papua New Guinea

Winner: Rajko

- Week 7: Wolof Wrestling – Senegal

Winner: Richard

- Week 8: Sepik Canoe Racing – Papua New Guinea

Winner: Jason (also named overall winner for British airings)

- Week 9: Kraho Log Running – Brazil

Winner: Rajko

- Week 10: Andean Ice Race – Peru

Winner: Richard

- Week 11: Pencak Silat – Indonesia

Winner: Brad

- Week 12: Vanuatu Canoe Race – Vanuatu

Winner: Jason (also named overall winner for American airings)

== Series two ==
Series 2 of Last Man Standing began airing in the UK on BBC Three on 14 October 2008. The overall winner was Wolé, since his win in the final competition was deemed the deciding factor in the draw which ensued, with Ed also having attained 3 wins.

=== Contestants ===
Name	Age	From	Discipline	Events won
Ed Donati	22	London	Modern pentathlon	3
Jarvis Albury	23	San Diego	Rugby	0
Jeremy "JJ" James	21	Florida	Submission wrestling	2
Joey Ricely	24	Chicago	Football	1
Murray Smith	22	Devon	Kitesurfing	1
Wolé Adesemoye	27	London	Boxing	3

=== Episodes ===
- Week 1: Suri Stick fighting – Ethiopia

Winner: Wolé

The first episode involved stick fighting with a 7-foot-long (2.1 m) stick, called the Donga. Officially, the only way to win is to either make your opponent bleed from the head or feet, or simply give up. However the Suri changed the rules for the contestants and also decided that they would fight amongst themselves to make it safer. Jarvis falls ill and is too weak to begin training which forces him to bow out. After a couple of days practising Wolé, Ed and surprisingly Murray are judged good enough to fight. The three competitors fight in a round robin competition where each contestant fights each other. In the first fight Wolé fights Murray and wins, despite Wolé landing a head shot against Murray which is against the rules for this competition. In the second fight Murray, needing a win to become the overall winner, fights Ed but only manages a draw. The third and final fight sees Wolé and Ed battle to win the overall competition. Controversially the fight is deemed a draw much to the surprise of Ed and the other competitors especially since Ed had already been handed a flag to signify his victory. This means that Wolé wins the overall competition for the first week.

- Week 2: Samo wrestling in Burkina Faso

Winner: Joey

Samo wrestling is highly physical and energy sapping, one wrong step swiftly results in smashing to the ground. One week two the boys travel to Burkina Faso in Africa to compete in a Samo wrestling tournament. They compete for a village called Nyon in a local Samo tournament and represented the village. Nyon's trainer is former Samowrestling champion Francois, Wolé and Jarvis impress in the initial training bouts but Ed reveals that he has been injured and is forced to pull out rather than risk serious damage so we're down to five. Francois takes Jarvis and Joey to sacred crocodiles and sacrifices two chickens in the hope for luck. The boys are on the team sheet for a night fight against the nearby village of Sawa. It's been arranged to help both teams prepare for the big contest. After a master-class with the national champion the boys enter the competition on behalf of Nyon. After two rounds Wolé and Joey hold the joint lead with a win and a draw each. Just behind are JJ and Murray, both with a single win. Murray and JJ lose their fights so it's down to just Wolé and Joey in the last round. Wolé faces Ki Ika, one of the top wrestlers in Burkina Faso who has already beaten Jarvis and drawn with Joey but brute force gives way to technique and Wolé loses. It was all down to Joey and all he needed was a win which he achieved and that means he wins the overall competition for the second week.

- Week 3: Endurance racing in Nepal

Winner: Ed

In week 3 the contestants competed in a Sherpa mountain race where they would eventually climb a 13,000-foot (4,000 m) mountain. The contestants would have to carry a 25 kg stone in the process. Contestants stayed in the village of Pikehop, 10,000 feet above sea level. Forty-year-old Pulba had the task of training the contestants and Murray seemed like an early favourite as he stayed right behind the Sherpa whilst the others all struggled. The final practise saw the competitors go to the halfway point of the full course. Again Murray did very well finishing well before the rest, however Ed also did well. Before the big race the competitors all chose their stones which all had different messages on them. Murray's tactics for the race were to start off very fast. When the race started he ran very fast and was right behind the Sherpa for some time. Joey got in trouble early on when his basket (used to carry the stone) breaks. Jarvis helps him out but both are well behind the others. After an hour into the race Murray is exhausted and Ed and Wolé pass him. Wolé remains close behind Ed however after more than three and a half hours Ed comes through and is crowned Last Man Standing for this week. Wolé comes through in second with Murray coming in third. JJ and Joey come through fourth and fifth, whilst Jarvis brings up the rear.

- Week 4: Canoeing in the Amazon

Winner: Ed

In week four the contestants travelled to the Mato Grosso for a 16 km canoe race, with 8 km going downstream before turning around and paddling back upstream. JJ and Jarvis were the early favourites to win the overall race as they did the best in the first few training sessions. On race day it was they who led from the start of the race before being reeled in by Wolé. After only a few minutes Ed flooded his canoe and once he had finished emptying his canoe he was dead last. He soon managed to overtake the back three and had Murray in his sights. He gradually overhauled Murray and coming into the turn he and Wolé were neck and neck. Joey retired from the race, after just about reaching the halfway point, as he was exhausted. He was also complaining that his boat lent to one side. For the other competitors going back upstream was much harder but Ed opened up a lead and Murray pushed past Wolé. The final stretch was a shoot out between Ed and Murray. However Ed managed to hold on and became the first ever athlete to win back to back victories on Last Man Standing.

- Week 5: Archery in Bhutan

Winner: JJ

In week 5, A first happened within the Travellers, they were split into 2 groups to take part in an Archery contest between two tribes which make the Manchester Derby look soft. The targets they shoot from in Practise and in the Contest were 3 times the original distance that they use at Olympic level. In the Contest JJ hits the target with his 3rd of 7 shots which puts him in the lead with 2 points but 2 turns later, Murray registers a near miss, which scores 1 point. On the last turn Ed manages to get a near miss but these are the only people to hit the target.

- Week 6: Endurance racing in deep snow in Kamchatka, Russia

Winner: Murray

- Week 7: Sikaran kick-fighting in the Philippines

Winner: Wolé

In week seven the group arrive in the Philippines to take part in a Sikaran kick-fighting competition. During a training spar with Wole, Jarvis breaks two fingers. The doctors set them in a cast and strongly advise him not to fight but Jarvis, desperately seeking his first win, chooses to ignore them and opts to complete his training and enter the contest. Even with his injury, Jarvis impresses the trainers and is tipped as the favourite. The competitors arrive at the contest and are told the rules: if a fighter steps outside the circle, or hits the opponent in the head or below the waist they receive a warning. Three warnings results in an instant disqualification. All the fighter's names are placed in a hat and then randomly drawn. JJ is drawn first against a local fighter and loses. Ed then defeats Murray via knockout. Jarvis beats his opponent and Wole defeats Joey. In the next round Ed, Wole and Jarvis all proceed to the semi-finals after their opponents are disqualified. Ed, severely injured in the last round, fights again immediately and loses. Jarvis and Wole face off in the other semi-final with everything on the line. Wole's first kick is a foul – a hard kick straight to Jarvis' testicles. After getting up again Jarvis forces Wole out of the ring and he receives his second warning. Next, Wole kicks Jarvis again in the testicles. There is much confusion over whether the kick was illegal (it would have been Wole's final warning and resultant disqualification) but the judges call it fair believing that Jarvis deflected Wole's kick below the waist. The fight ends in a draw and the judges declare Wole the winner with a vote of 2-to-1 giving him his second controversial victory on Last Man Standing. Jarvis is devastated whilst Wole goes on to win the final and become the local Sikaran champion.

- Week 8: Water Buffalo racing in the Indonesian island of Sumbawa

Winner: JJ

In week 8 the group took part in buffalo racing, a sport whereby two buffalo are attached to a frame where a jockey stand and steers them down the course. Wole is disappointed this event doesn't give him the opportunity to whack the other contestants. Later the athletes choose their buffalo and Wole changes his mind about the sport when he draws a pair of fast and well-bred buffalo. Joey draws the fastest buffalo of the lot but very wild and his temper and attitude towards the buffalo doesn't go down well with the locals. Murray draws the wildest buffalo of the lot and considers using the frame as a surf board down the course. Ed and JJ seem to be doing well and Joey finally manages to control his buffalo to some extent. On race day Wole and his thoroughbreds are hot favourites to win, the race is a straight course with a jump halfway down and a magic doll at the end to knock down only candidates that knock down the doll will have their times counted and each candidate only gets one run. Joey and Wole miss the target whilst Murrays buffalo stop moving near the end of the course putting him out of the running as well. Jarvis's buffalo run into the side but he is given a second chance due to a false start. On his second attempt his frame breaks putting him out of contention. JJ knocks down the doll and moves to second overall in the contest and first amongst the athletes. The final candidate Ed misses the doll making JJ the last man standing.

- Week 9: Kushti mud wrestling in India

Winner: Ed

Week Nine sees the group arrive in India to take part in Kushti Mud Wrestling. Ed and Wole have problems with their technique from the start while JJ is flagged as the early favourite. Murray must leave less he risk permanently damaging his already injured knee. In a training session JJ dislocates his shoulder and must leave the competition. When the tournament match decider comes and finds himself unable to decide who should face Wole, he decides that the best course of action is to fight him himself and it is revealed he is a former state champion although he hasn't wrestled in two years. In the match Wole's strength is unable to overcome the defensive technique of the former champion. Despite dominating the exchanges Wole is unable to place his opponents back onto the floor and loses after being thrown on his back from a standing position. This performance handicaps Wole as the organiser decides to place Wole in with the harder opponents after being impressed by Wole's ability. The tournament comes around and Ed finds his win quickly after the opening bell with a traditional Kushti throw. Joey then loses as does Wole but Jarvis manages a win from a defensive position. After a count from the judges Ed is called as the winner his winning technique being worth 3 points to Jarvis' 2 to the crushing disappointment of Jarvis.

- Week 10: Canoeing in the Pacific

Winner: Wolé

The final event in the series is an epic 25 mile open water canoe race held over two days. After arriving at the island the boys are not surprised to discover that they will be racing canoes. The first few days are fun for all with only light training, made easier by the fact that these canoes are proper oceangoing vessels with outriggers making them stable and straight. When the group help with harvesting the sea it becomes apparent that Joey and Jarvis are not comfortable at all, while Murray is in his element and the others, although not super confident, are showing good resilience and willpower. As the race approaches the length of the race is revealed to the athletes, as well as the course and its inherent dangers such as the reef, breaking waves, strong currents, sharks in the water and crocodiles near and on land. This leaves the athletes with very sober looks on their faces. The first day of paddling will see the boys reach one of two midpoint islands for the night, the catch being that if you attempt to make the second island and fail to do so before sunset you will be sent back to the first exhausted and with further to paddle on the second day. Ed believes that Murray may burn himself out as he did in Nepal and sets himself for a steady pace. Heavy rain the day before the race is a bad omen as it is always followed by strong winds and high seas. As the race begins, Murray's knowledge of the sea helps him through the reef and JJ is smart enough to stick close behind giving him second place. the other boys all struggle with the big waves hitting the reef and it's too much for Joey and Jarvis who retire almost immediately leaving the trainers shattered. Ed struggles for an hour but finally clears the reef while Wole requires help from a local. This sees an absolutely gargantuan performance from Wole who manages to pass all but Murray on the first leg with all the remaining athletes making it to the second island before sunset. While Murray is feeling good the others are exhausted and JJ in particular is struggling, having had his shoulder badly injured in the previous challenge. The next Wole is up first indicating his strong ambition to win, trying to get any advantage possible by consulting the locals. The first half of the second leg sees a fantastic struggle between Wole, Murray and Ed, with JJ dropping back in considerable pain and frustration. The run home on the second leg once again sees Wole simply out-muscling Murray and Ed who begin to fatigue. Murray stays in touch however and Wole once again struggles to overcome the reef, this time grounding his canoe badly. As Murray pushes to overtake Wole desperately scrambles over the reef, this time unassisted, cutting himself all over on the sharp reef. As Murray is approaching Wole manages to free himself and find a last effort for the shore where he arrives first, just in front of an exhausted Murray with Ed only a few minutes back finishing in third leaving JJ to struggle home in the rear. This huge effort sees Wole crowned the Last Man Standing overall.

== Last Woman Standing ==
The third series of the programme featured five female contestants, and was entitled Last Woman Standing. It consisted of six episodes produced by the BBC, and was broadcast in the UK on BBC Three from 9 February to 16 March 2010.

=== Contestants ===
Name	Age	From	Discipline	Events won
Anna Campbell	23	Lamu	Wakeboarding	3
Joni Swanston	23	Belfast	Rugby union	1
Lesley Sackey	27	London	Boxing	2
Alexandra Alam	19	Essex	Personal trainer	0
Natalie Smith	24	Newcastle upon Tyne	Kettlebell lifting	0

=== Episodes ===
- Week 1: Kamaiura Wrestling – Brazil

Winner: Joni Swanston

- Week 2: Xavante Log running – Brazil

Winner: Lesley Sackey

- Week 3: Banahaw Kali stick fighting – Philippines

Winner: Anna Campbell

- Week 4: Coron Island Bamboo raft racing – Philippines

Winner: Anna Campbell

- Week 5: Sumbawa Water buffalo racing – Indonesia

Winner: Lesley Sackey

- Week 6: Tarahumara Mountain endurance race – Mexico

Winner: Anna Campbell (also named overall winner)
