= Aoleang =

Annual Konyak Naga festival in India

Aoleang Monyü or simply Aoleang is a festival celebrated by the Konyak Naga people and is held in the first week of April mainly in the Mon District of the Indian state of Nagaland.

The Aoleang festival differs from the more famous Hornbill Festival, which is arranged to preserve the cultures of all the different tribes in Nagaland. While Aoleang festival is an authentic tribal festival arranged by the Konyak tribe only.

== Dates of festival ==
The Aoleang celebrates the arrival of spring and prays for a good upcoming harvest. The celebrations are held in the first week of April and coincide with the start of the Konyak New Year. However, dates can change as the festival is celebrated in villages across the district with no defined schedule. You have to ask around about where and when events are taking place when you get there.

== Konyak ==
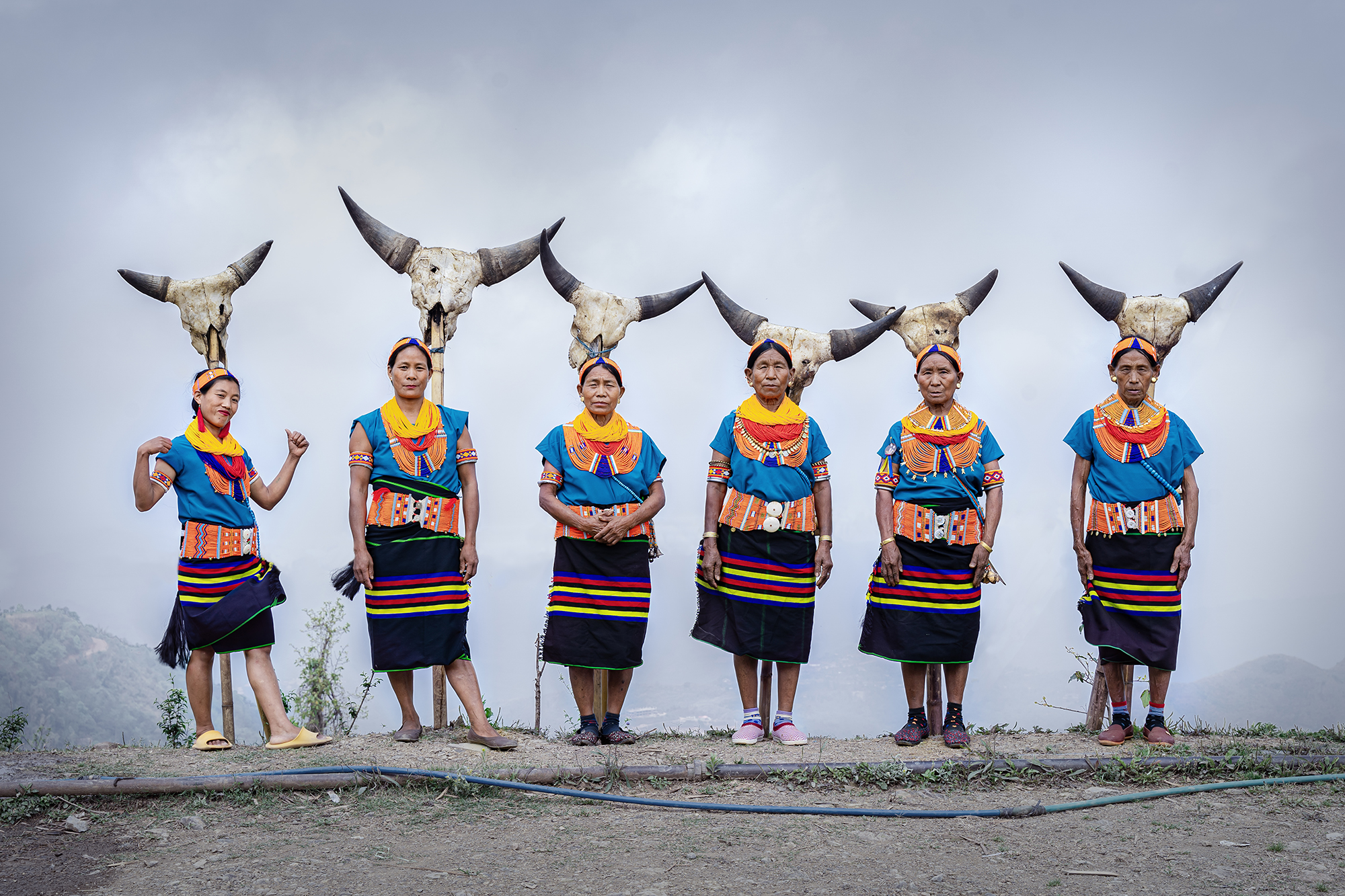
Aoleang is observed to mark the end of the old year and to welcome the new-year beginning with spring. Prayers are offered to God for a bountiful harvest.

The Konyak people are the largest of 17 officially recognized tribes in Nagaland and are the most well known due to their past tradition of head hunting. The Konyak people are found in the Mon region of Nagaland and in neighboring Myanmar making these places the best to witness the Aoleang Festival. Konyak Naga people can be identified by their tattoo faces and they mostly known for their headhunters past. The festival is one of the most important festival from other festivals.

== Celebration ==
The Festival celebration is spread across a week. The main purpose of the Aoleang is to welcome in the spring and new year and to pray for a good harvest. During the Aoleang many rituals take place including dancing, feasting and sacrifices that are meant to appease the divine spirits in order to bless the land with a good harvest.

The first 3 days of the Aoleang festival are called Hoi Lah Nyih, Yin Mok Pho Nyih and Mok Shek Nyih. These days are spent preparing for the festival by weaving traditional cloths, collecting the animals that will be sacrificed and preparing food and rice beer for the festival.

The fourth day, known as Lingnyu Nyih, is the most important day of the Aoleang in which all the members of the Konyak tribe dress up in their best colorful traditional tribal clothes and jewellery. The fourth day is the most interesting to watch as the whole day is spent dancing, singing and feasting as a community and the indigenous dances that they perform symbolize the tribe's history as headhunters.

The final two days of the festival are called Lingha Nyih and Lingshan Nyih. This time is dedicated to spending time with family and cleaning the whole village and also individual houses.

== See also ==
- List of traditional Naga festivals
