= Mungmung =

Festival in Nagaland, India

Mungmung is an annual festival of the Sangtam Nagas held in September in the state of Nagaland, India.

== See also ==
- List of traditional Naga festivals
