= Sekrenyi =

Angami Nagas festival based in Nagaland, India

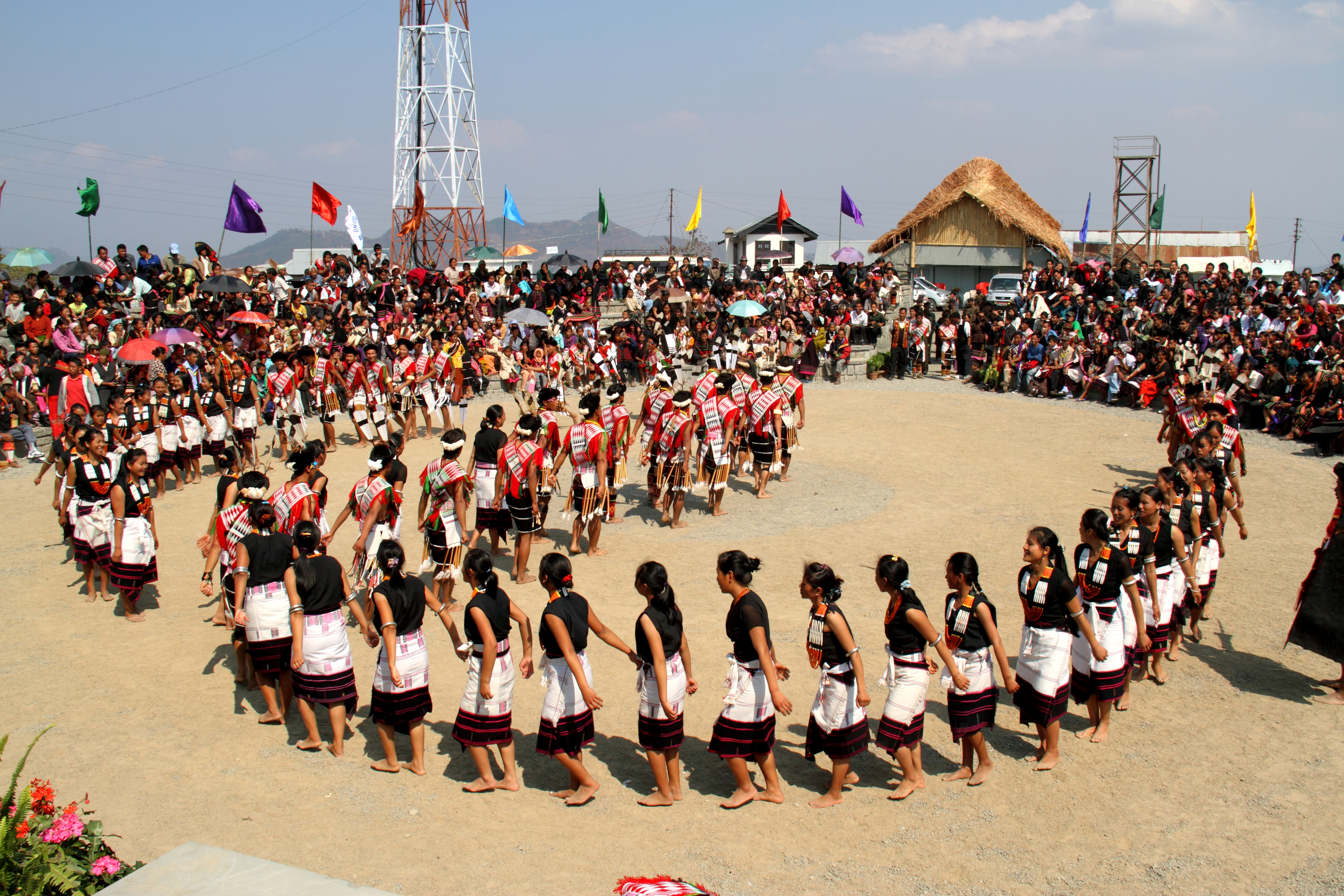
- Dance and singing at an Angami Naga festival
- Official name: Sekrenyi
- Also called: Sokre-n; Phousanyi
- Observed by: Angami Nagas
- Significance: New Year
- Celebrations: Ten days
- Date: 25 February
- Frequency: Annual

Sekrenyi, also known as Sokre-n and Phousanyi, is a major annual festival of the Angami Nagas, in the northeast Indian state of Nagaland. It is observed for ten days from the 25th day of the Angami calendar month of "Kezei" (usually corresponding to 25 February in the Gregorian calendar) under the auspices of the Angami Public Organisation in association with many other organizations and the state government. It is a "purification festival" held to wash off all past sins. The objective of the festival is to renew and "make holy" by cleansing the "body and the soul" of the village as a whole, and to bring forth unity among all communities of Nagaland. It also marks initiation of young people to adulthood and is considered an "identity marker of the Angami". The Christian converts among this community have gradually rejected these rituals.

== Details ==
Sekrenyi is a compound word formed by Sekre meaning "sanctification" and Nyi meaning "festival." The festival calendar is linked to the agricultural cycle, which varies from village to village. Thus, the celebration is held between the months of December–March, and the duration also varies from ten to fifteen days.

The festival is generally held starting from 25 February as per the Gregorian calendar. It is celebrated by both the Krüna Angami/Pfütsana and Christian Angami. The duration is reduced to five days for the Christian villagers who had earlier converted to Christianity but belonged to the same ethnic group; they participate in the festivities but they do not follow any of the rituals connected with it.

In New Delhi, the capital city of India, the Angami population of Delhi under the banner of Angami Krotho Delhi comes together as a community every year to celebrate Sekrenyi.

== Rituals ==
The festival involves a number of ceremonies and rituals. On the first day, which is known as Kezie, people sprinkle themselves with a few drops of rice water drawn from a pot named Zumho. The water drops are first gathered into leaves, and the chief lady of the house reverently fixes the leaves at the three main corner pillars of the house. This is followed by the men assembling at the well to bathe.

On the second day, young men of the village assemble in the village to perform ablutions. They adorn themselves with two new shawls, and then ritualistically sprinkle the holy water on their chests, knees and right arms as a mark of washing away all their sins and ill luck. When they come back from the well, a sacrificial offer of a cock is performed.

The fourth day of the festival marks the New Year of the Angamis. It begins with revelry by singing and feasting which lasts for three days. The young people, both men and unmarried girls with shaven heads gather and sing traditional songs the entire day; the songs relate to past days of valour and bravery. For the revelry of music and dance, the men and women of the community wear traditional dress; while men carry head hunting spades, women carry baskets.

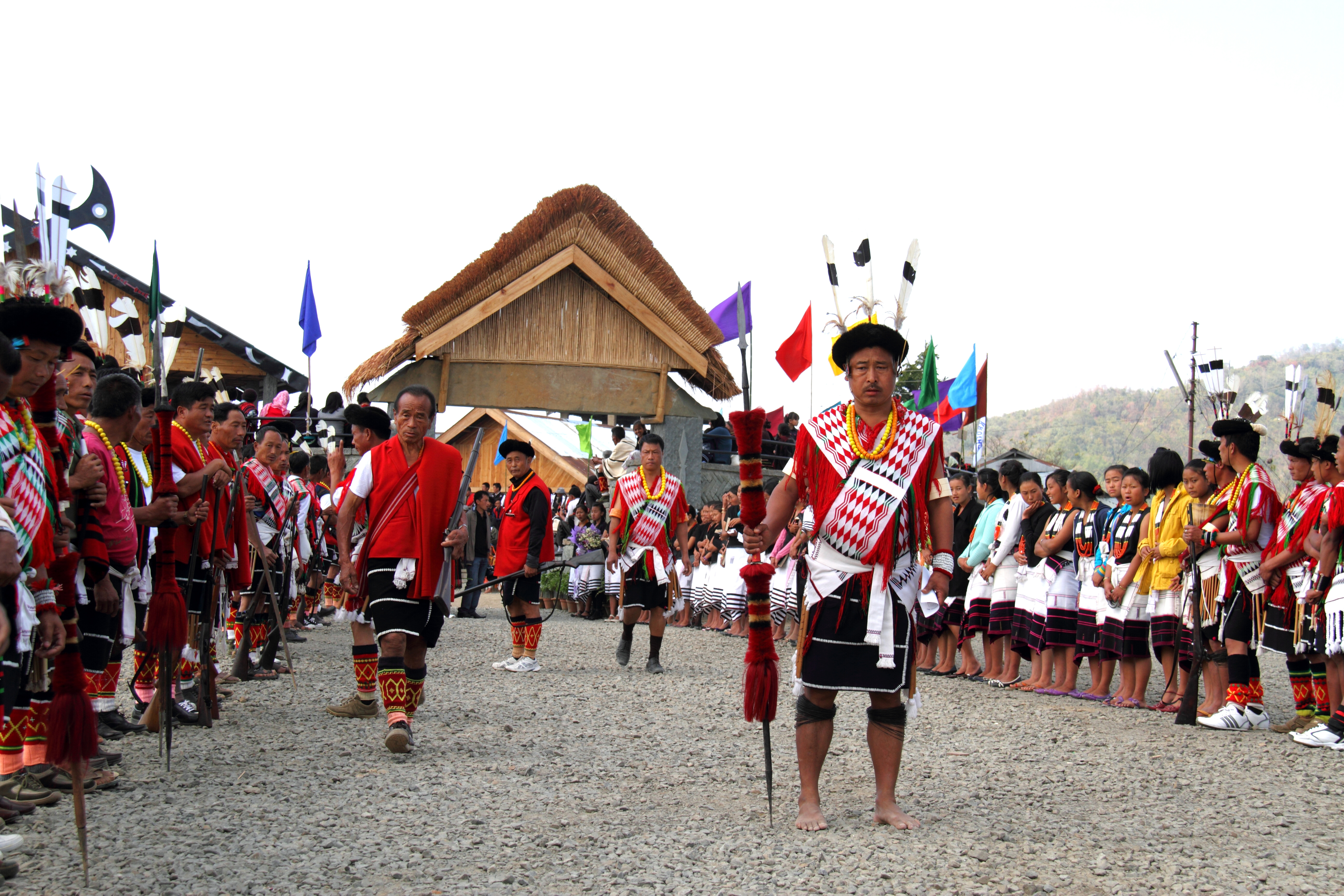
Angami Nagas at the festival

The seventh day is devoted to hunting by the young men of the ethnic group. On the eighth day, the ritual involves the pulling down of a gate (meaning replacing an old gate that demarcates the property). This is followed in the next two days by the people of the villages formally exchanging visits and offering greetings. During the period of the ten day festivities, field operations are suspended; in local terminology this act is called Penyû. Following the completion of the festival period, when men of the villages have cleansed themselves and sought blessings, cultivation, house building and marriages may restart for the year.

== See also ==
- List of traditional Naga festivals
