= Tokhü Emong =

Harvest festival celebrated by the Lotha Nagas in India

Tokhü Emong is a harvest festival celebrated by the Lotha Nagas in the Indian state of Nagaland. The nine day Fall festival celebrates the end of the harvest season.

== Etymology ==
In the Lotha Naga language, tokhü means feast (eating food and drinking) and emong means halt on the appointed time.

== Overview ==
Tokhü Emong is celebrated in the first week of November every year and it lasts for nine days. This festival is associated with the harvesting of crops. It is also accompanied by folk dances and singing of folk songs.

During Tokhü Emong, the adherents praise the gods for their blessings. Tokhü Emong is also a celebration of brotherhood, forgiveness, and oneness. It is celebrated through sharing of food, gifts, folklore narration and a community feast.

During this festival, the entire Village takes part in the celebration. Every household have food and drinks prepared for the feast. Friends, families neighbors are invited to each other's house and this continues for 9 days. The main features of the feast are community songs, dances, feast, fun and frolic. Everyone attires themselves in their beautiful traditional dresses and costumes according to their social status. There is an air of gaiety and light heartedness everywhere. Gifts of food and drinks are exchanged during the Festival. Among friends, the number of cooked meat given denotes the depth of friendship and ties. For example, if one man offers 12 pieces of meat to his friend, it shows that he treasures his friendship, it is reciprocated, and he is also offered 12 pieces of meat, it means that the friendship is valued from both sides.

In this case, should any disaster or misfortunes strikes either one of them, both of them will stand by each other no matter what. Thus a friendship of loyalty and fidelity was pledged. In case of mere acquaintances or platonic ones, only 6 pieces of meat are exchanged.

It is the Priest who gives the signal for the start of the festival. He accompanied by aides (Yinga) along with baskets goes round the village collecting un husked rice from every home when offering is made. The priest takes a handful of it, showers prayers and it is only after this that he puts the contribution in his basket. The belief was that the more generous the contribution, the more yield one would get during harvest but if any one refuses to contribute, he would lead a pauper's life. So none would dare to refuse contribution for fear of that. A portion of the collection is used to buy a pig and the rest is used for making rice-beer. The pig is killed and cut and is distributed to the contributors. The ritual is considered as contributing factor to general prosperity.

Before the commencement of the festival, if any stranger happens to be in the village, he gets two options; to leave the village (past beyond the village gate) before sunset or to stay there in the village until the festival is over. He however, enjoys the warm hospitality of the villagers. This festival also provide the occasion to offer prayers for the departed souls. The family who lost any member during the year performs his/her last rites. The people remain in the village till the last rites are performed.

Young boys and girls engaged during the year are happily married after Tokhü. It is also the time for renovating the village gate, cleaning wells and repairing houses.

Tokhü Emong is also a festival of thanks giving, sharing and reconciliation but the most beautiful aspect of this festival is that past rancours are forgiven, new ties are formed and bonds of closer intimacy are formed.

Wild cries of Joy-echo over the green hills and narrow valleys. One feels as if the stones have been given tongue to say ‘Oh farmers, tender your fields with love and care’.

== Customs and rituals ==
=== Before the festival ===
The village priest proclaims the opening of Tokhü Emong. He travels door-to door in the village with a basket to collect edibles. For this purpose Yinga, or supporters, also accompanied him. This collection is an offering to the Limha Potsow Ha Oyak Potsow (Earth-God and Sky-God). The priest takes a small quantity of the contribution and put it into his basket after offering his prayers. It is customary for the fellow villagers to contribute liberally as it is believed that more contribution facilitated more crops during cultivation. According to legend, anyone who refuses a contribution brings a bad curse upon themselves and ends up as a beggar.

A fraction of this gathering is used to buy a pig and the rest was kept for making rice beer. Later, with the help of a bamboo spear, a perforation is made in the pig's heart, then the abdomen is sliced open to interpret the prophecy. The priest reads the destiny of the village from the entrails.. The pig is then divided into small portions and distributed amongst every household.

If a stranger arrives in the village before the festival starts, he or she can either leave or stay as a guest throughout the festival, enjoying the hospitality of the village.

The wells of the villages are cleaned and the houses are repaired as well.

=== During the festival ===
There may be a slight difference in some ritual performance and other celebrating activities in between the villages among the Lothas. The village itself had its own priest and customary laws within its village and therefore, act or perform accordingly. However, the identity of Tokhü Emong, its significance, and subjects or aims are all same.

The people wear their conventional dresses to the ceremonies

Prayers are offered to the spirits of the people who had died in the previous year. Any family who lost any member is expected to stay in the village until the last rituals are performed. Villagers are expected to put aside bitterness and settle all problems with others. People express their gratitude for what they have and strive to create new ties of friendship.

A meal is served to everyone, followed by folk dance, folk songs. and the exchange of gifts

After the festival, marriages are arranged for the young couples, who were engaged during the year.

== Dates ==
Tokhü Emong is an annual festival that begins on 7 November and continues for nine days. Historically, the festival did not have a fixed start date; Lotha Naga elders settled on a fixed date in order to strengthen unity among the community. Recently, the Nagaland Government has set a date on Nagaland Government calendar as holidays for Lothas only, on 6 and 7 November.

== Tokhü Emong Bird Count ==
Since 2022, the Nagaland Forest Department in collaboration with others organises the Tokhü Emong Bird Count aimed at promoting the state's biodiversity and encourage community conservation efforts.

== See also ==
- List of traditional Naga festivals
