= Lui Ngai Ni =

Seed-sowing festiva in Manipur India

- Type: Naga cultural festival
- Significance: Seed sowing festival of the Nagas in Manipur
- Celebrations: Cultural exchange programs and activities
- Observances: 14–15 February
- Related to: Marks the beginning of the yearly activities

Lui Ngai Ni is the seed-sowing festival celebrated by the Naga tribes of Manipur India. The festival heralds the season of seed sowing and marks the start of the year for the Nagas and the festival was declared a state holiday since 1988.

== Etymology ==
The word "Lui - Ngai - Ni" is coined from three different Naga languages. "Lui" comes from "Luiraphanit", a Tangkhul word for seed sowing festival, "Ngai" means festival in Rongmei language and "Ni" is a Mao word for the seed sowing festival.

The festival is celebrated annually on 15 February at the start of the spring season. During the festival, the Naga tribes in Manipur namely Anal, Mao, Maram, Poumai, Tangkhul, Zeme, Liangmai, Rongmei, Inpui/Puimei, Moyon, Monsang, Maring, Khoibu, Kom, Tarao, Lamkang, Chothe, Kharam, Chiru, Koireng, and Thangal come together at the designated location to converge and showcase their rich cultural heritage. Apart from the major Naga tribes in Manipur, other Naga tribes from Nagaland, Assam and Arunachal Pradesh partake in the festivities as special guests and invitees. The Ministry of Tourism of the Government of India on 24 December 1986 gave away a special day of remembrance and recognition for the Nagas. Since then it is celebrated in various Naga's inhibited areas. It is the second major inter-tribe Naga festival after Hornbill Festival, which is celebrated by more than ten Naga tribes of Nagaland.

== Significance ==
The festival is a special occasion to honour and appease the gods of crop and to pray for the well-being of the people. Various cultural activities are showcased during the festival such as Cultural Dances and songs, including various cultural attire shows, lighting of the fire, drum beating, traditional folk dances and songs. Lui-Ngai-Ni festival is celebrated in all the Naga inhabited areas in Manipur, however, the main festivity is hosted alternately at the Naga inhabited district headquarters namely Ukhrul, Tamenglong, Senapati and Chandel.

The festival is a unique event to respect and conciliate the divine forces of yield and to appeal to God for the prosperity of the general population. Different social exercises are exhibited amid the celebration, for example, Cultural Dances and melodies, including different social clothing appears, lighting of the fire, drum thumping etc. All tribes comes together in unity and showcase their culture and identity which tighten their bond of brotherhood.

== See also ==
- Hornbill Festival, an inter-ethnic festival celebrated in Nagaland.
