= Lainong Naga =

Htangan, Zëūdiāng-Lainòng

Total population
- 22,617

Languages
- Lainong language

Related ethnic groups
- Khiamniungan people, Other Naga people

The Lainong people, also known as the Lainong Naga, are a Tibeto-Burmese ethnic group that mostly resides in Naga Self-Administered Zone in Myanmar. They are one of the major Naga ethnic groups of Myanmar and mostly inhabit the Lahe and Hkamti Townships in Myanmar. A recent study shows that Lainong people are rich in traditional ecological knowledge, particularly, the remote areas have a better chance to preserve cultural knowledge and birds vocabulary.

== Festival ==
The Lainong Naga people observe numerous seasonal festivals throughout the agricultural cycle. Traditional feast rituals are generally divided into two distinct categories: those practiced collectively in the Jhum fields and those observed exclusively within the household.

=== Kaīvi ===
Kaīvi is the New Year Festival of Lainong people. It is celebrated in March, the month of Kaīvinyiù leiˈ and Kaīvivian leiˈof Lainong people. Kaīvi is a compound words: Kaī which means 'virtue' and Vi means 'beginning', so Kaīvi means the beginning of blessing or new year. Before this ritual service is conducted there is no other ritual service to be done in the new farm field or in the village. According to recent research, the oral traditions of the Lainong Naga people serve as vital cultural anchors. It is celebrated for six days;

1. Kaīvi Peithiam (Preparing wood for the sacrificial post)
2. Kaīvi Zëūcyōm (Nominating the sacrificial lamb)
3. Kaīvi Zëūqui (Sacrificing the lamb at the main altar)
4. Kaīvi Lòngnëū (Day of meditation)
5. Lòhuì (Tax collection; dancing begins that evening)
6. Kaīvi Nōaˈ (Day of rest)
