= Sangtam people =

Major Naga ethnic group

Sangtam
Total population
- 74,994 approx. (2011)

Languages
- Sangtam language

Religion
- 99.2% Christianity (Baptist, Catholic)

Related ethnic groups
- Other Naga people

The Sangtams are a major Naga ethnic group native to the Kiphire District and Tuensang district in the Northeast Indian state of Nagaland.

Like many other ethnic groups in Northeast India, they practice jhum, or shifting cultivation. Naga peoples in Nagaland practiced animistic religions until their conversion to Christianity starting in the mid-19th century; the Sangtam have retained their traditional beliefs to a greater degree than most and celebrate twelve traditional festivals, including Mungmung.

The Sangtam people are one of the major ethnic groups in Nagaland. Towards the south-eastern part of Nagaland, they inhabit the Kiphire District. The northern part of Sangtam includes the Longkhim-Chare sub-division of Tuensang District. They are united under the common banner called "United Sangtam". There are 62 recognised villages of the Sangtams, 24 villages under Longkhim-Chare sub-division and 38 villages under Kiphire District as of recent data. There are seven government administrative towns under united Sangtam jurisdiction. In recent years, Sangtam villages namely Tsithrongse and Mürise Village under Chümoukedima District and Sangtamtilla Village under Dimapur District has also been recognised.

== See also ==
- Chakhesang Naga
- Sangtam language
