= List of traditional Naga games and sports =

The following is a list of traditional Naga games and sport.

== Games ==
=== Angami ===
- Terhüchü, a two-player abstract strategy board game.

== Sports ==
=== Angami ===
- Kene, a folk wrestling style and traditional sport of the Nagas.
- Pcheda, a sport that requires players to throw thin bamboo sticks from a set distance.

=== Sümi ===
- Aki Kiti, a semi-contact combat sport characterized by kicking and blocking solely using the soles of the feet.
