= Kisama Heritage Village =

Naga Heritage Village

Coordinates: 25.616182°N 94.114627°E

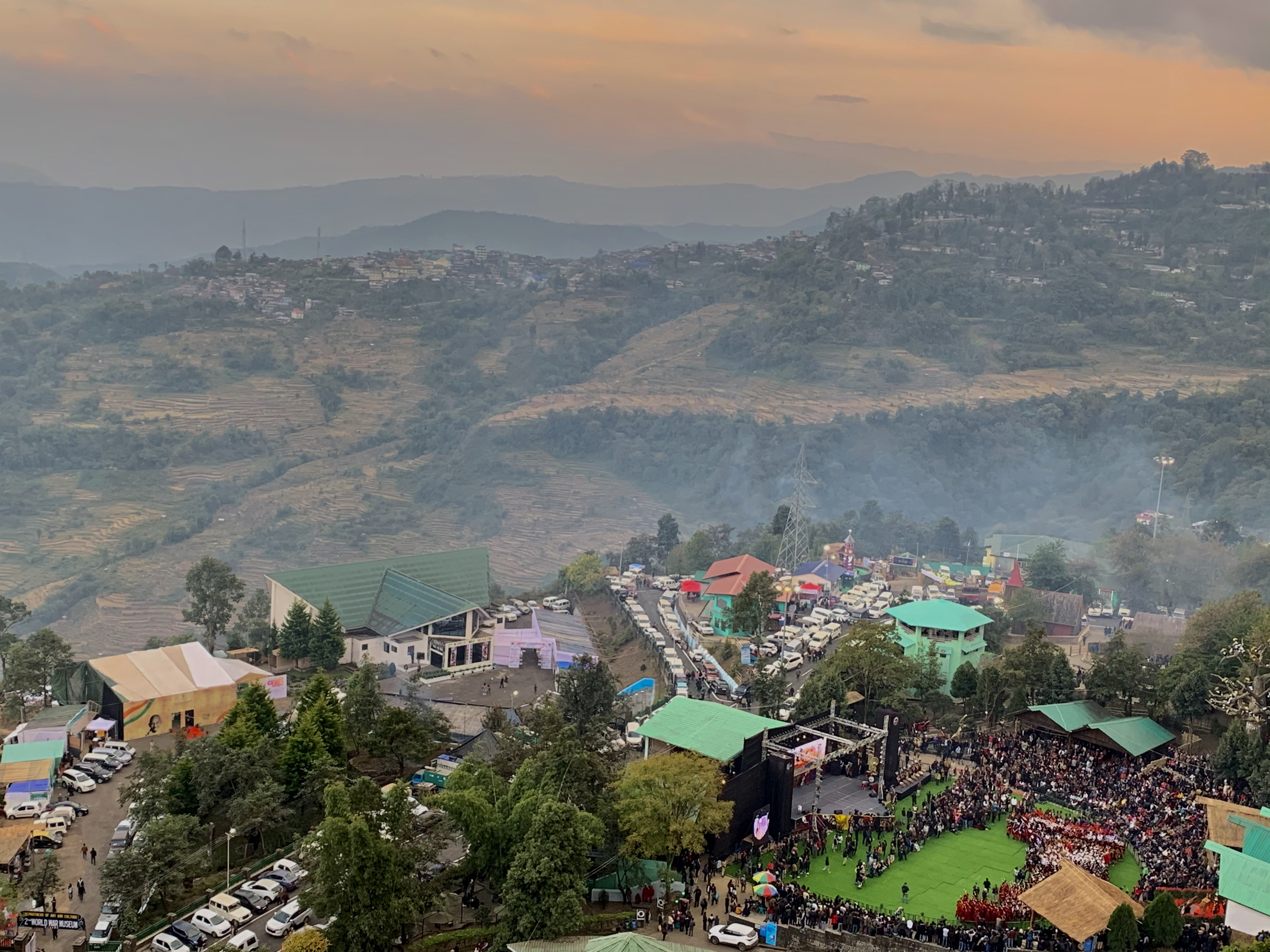
- Kisama Heritage Village
- Location: Kigwema–Phesama, Kohima District, Nagaland

Kisama Heritage Village (also Naga Heritage Village) is a Heritage Village located on the slopes of a hill between Kigwema and Phesama Villages in the Kohima District of the Indian state of Nagaland. The Heritage Village is the venue of the annual Hornbill Festival.

The Heritage Village houses the morungs of all the 17 ethnic groups of Nagaland and is designed in the form of an ancient Naga village to give the feel of an authentic traditional Naga village.

== Name ==
The name Kisama is an amalgamation of the names of its two neighbouring villages: Ki from Kigwema, sa from Phesama and ma from both Kigwema and Phesama.

== Location ==
The Kisama Heritage Village is located 12 km (7.5 mi) south of Kohima, the capital of Nagaland. The site is located above the Asian Highway 1/National Highway 2 between Kigwema and Phesama.

== Gallery ==
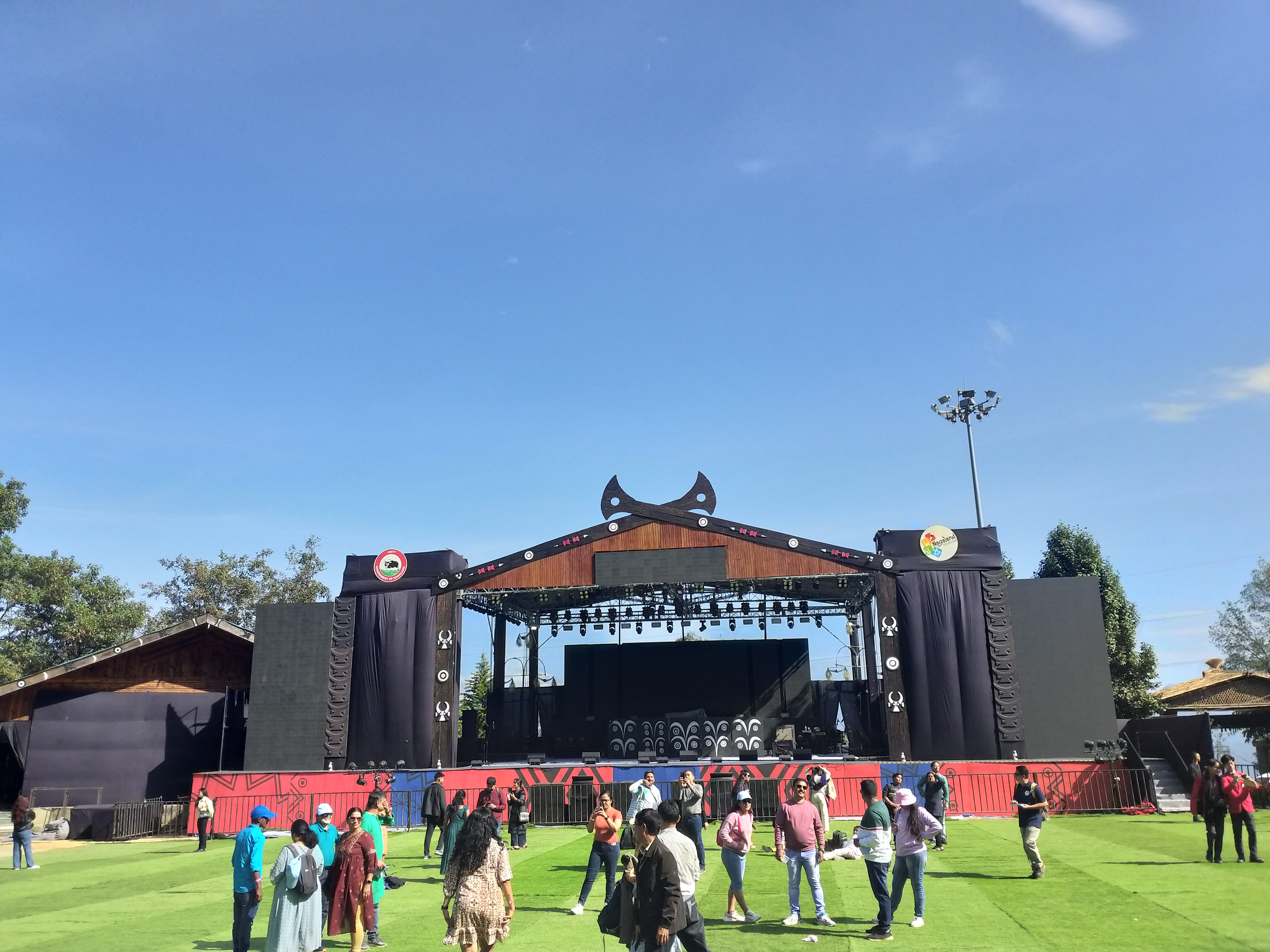
Hornbill Festival, Kisama Heritage Village, Nagaland

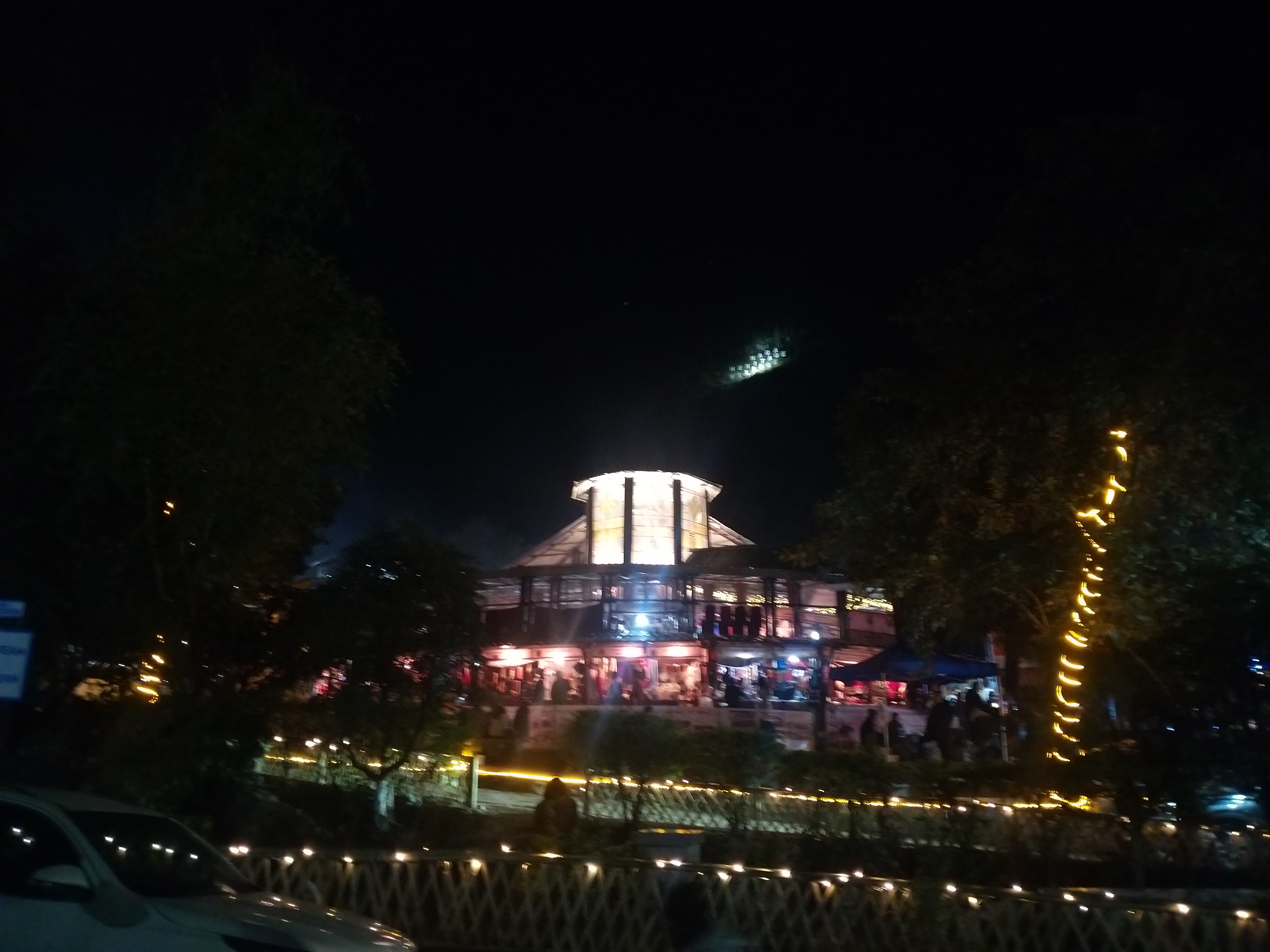
Hornbill Festival, Kisama Heritage Village, Nagaland night view

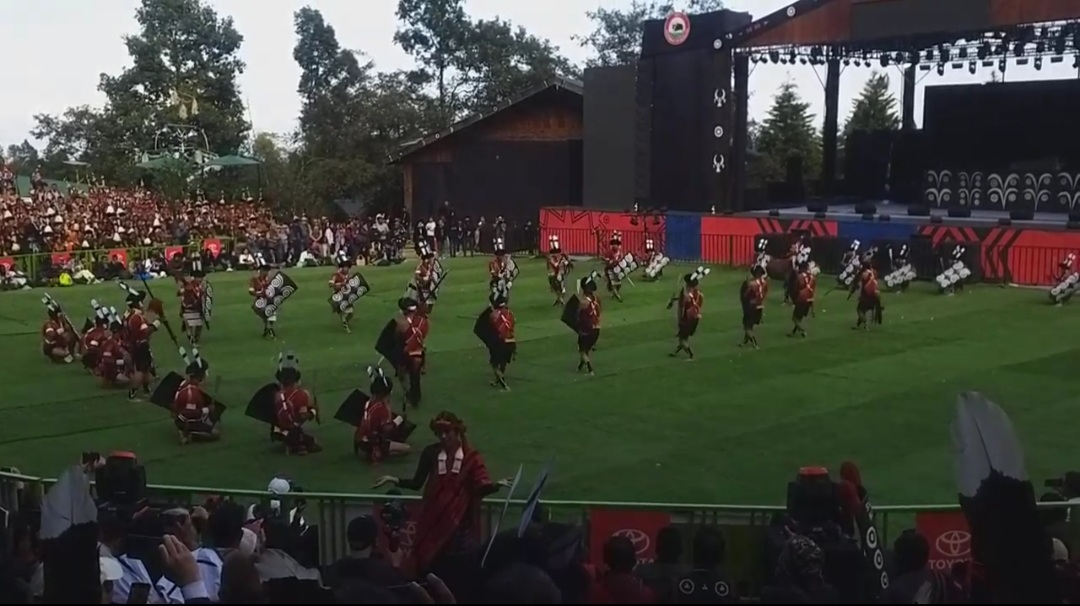
Hornbill Festival, Kisama Heritage Village, Nagaland
