= Hornbill Festival =

Annual festival in Nagaland, India

- 2014 edition logo
- Begins: 1 December 2026
- Ends: 10 December 2026
- Frequency: Annually
- Venue: Kisama Heritage Village, Kohima district, Nagaland, India
- Inaugurated: 1 December 2000; 25 years ago
- Previous event: 2025
- Next event: 2026
- Patron: Government of Nagaland

Hornbill Festival is an annual festival celebrated from 1 to 10 of December in the Northeastern Indian state of Nagaland. The festival represents all ethnic groups of Nagaland for which it is also called the Festival of Festivals.

== Etymology ==
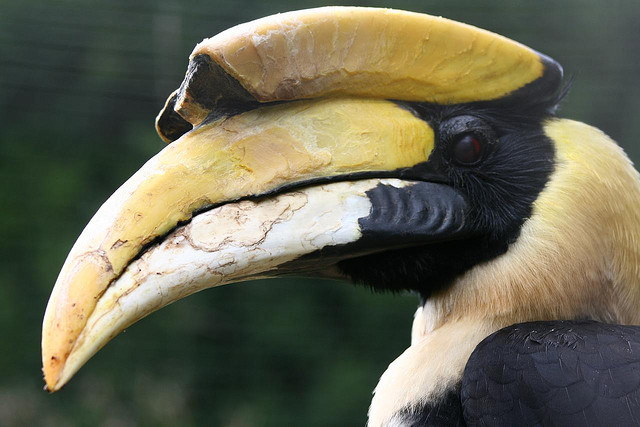
Hornbill

The festival is named after the hornbill, the large and colourful forest bird which is displayed in the folklore of most of the state's ethnic groups.

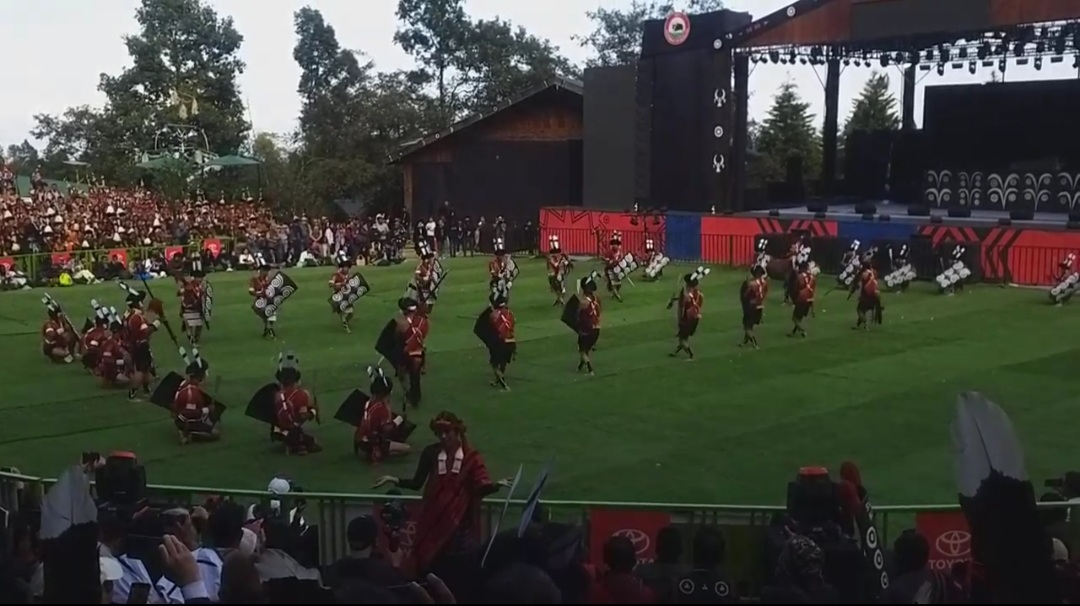
Hornbill Festival, Nagaland dance

== Background ==
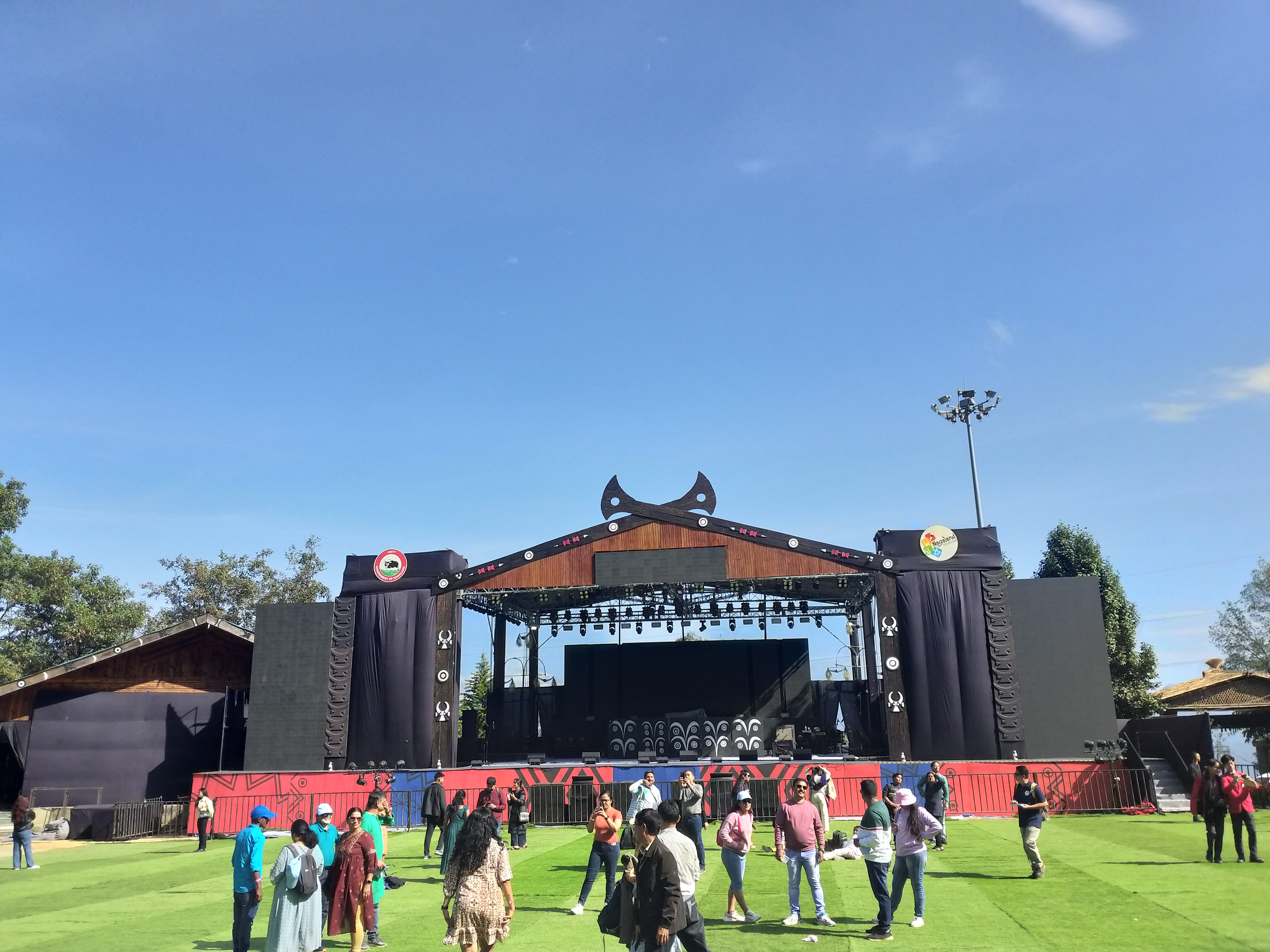
Hornbill Festival, Nagaland

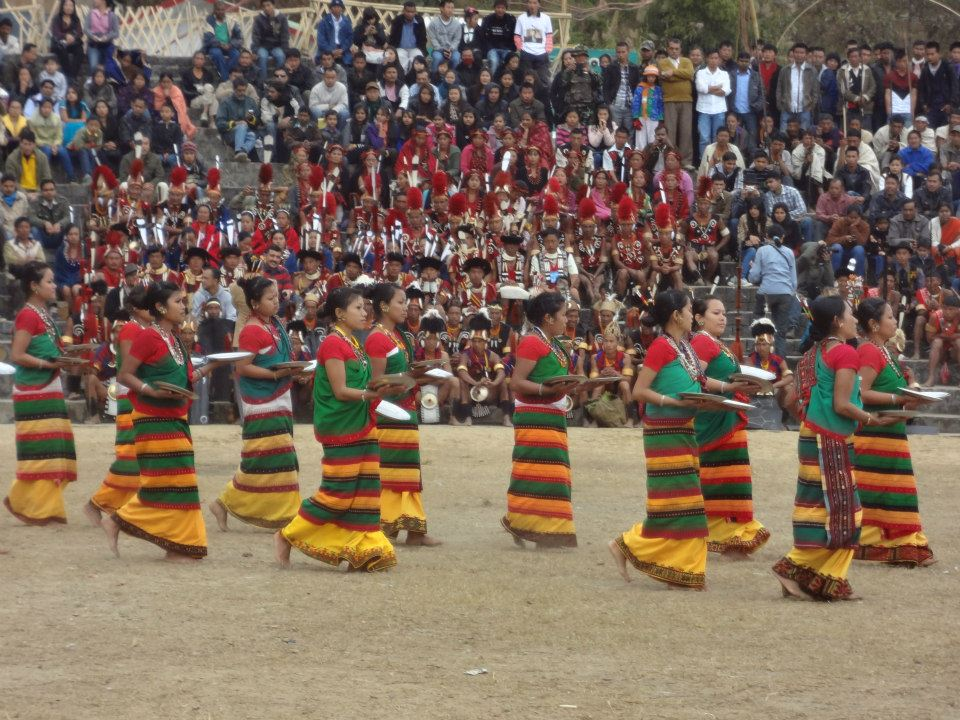
Kachari women celebrating the Hornbill Festival

The state of Nagaland is home to several ethnic groups, which have their own distinct festivals. More than 60% of the population of Nagaland depends on agriculture and therefore most of their festivals revolve around agriculture. The Nagas consider their festivals sacred, so participation in these festivals is essential.

To encourage inter-ethnic interaction and to promote cultural heritage of Nagaland, the Government of Nagaland organises the Hornbill Festival every year in the first week of December. The first festival was held in December 2000.

== Celebrations ==
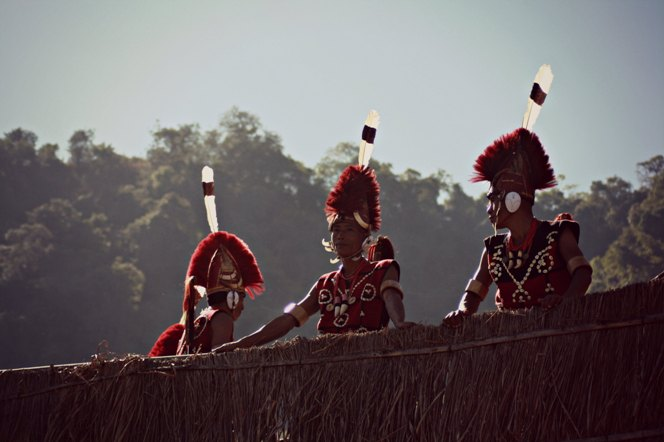
Naga tribesmen at Kisama during the Hornbill Festival of Nagaland.

Organised by the Department of State Tourism and Department of Art & Culture, the Hornbill Festival showcases a mélange of cultural displays under one roof. This festival usually takes place between 1 and 10 December every year mainly in Kohima District.

The main venue of the Hornbill Festival is held at the Kisama Heritage Village located in the Southern Angami region of Kohima District which is about 12 km from Kohima. All the ethnic groups of Nagaland take part in this festival. The aim of the festival is to revive and protect the rich culture of Nagaland and display its extravaganza and traditions.

For visitors it means a closer understanding of the people and culture of Nagaland, and an opportunity to experience the food, songs, dances and customs of Nagaland.

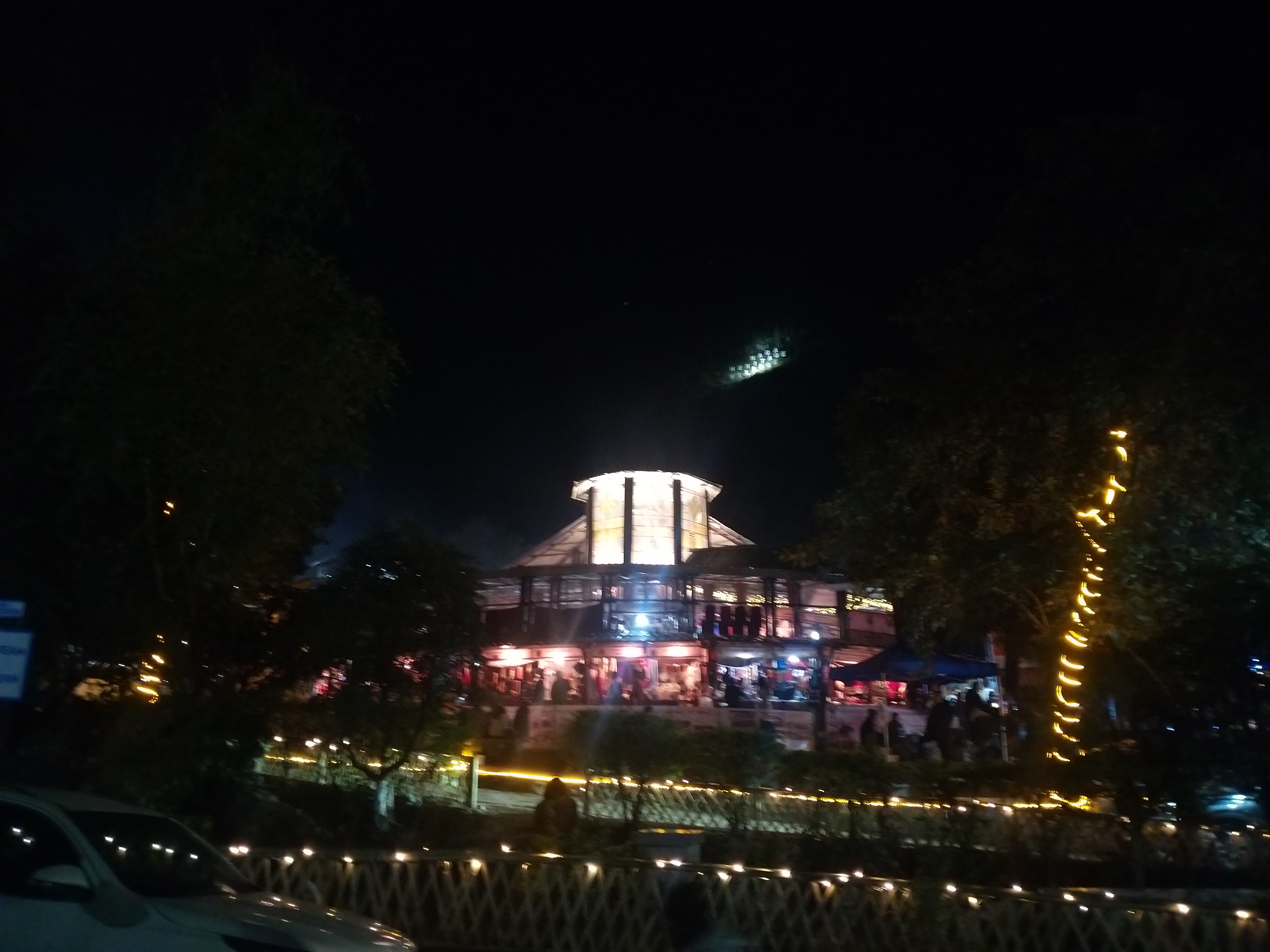
Night view of Hornbill Festival

== Festival activities ==
The week-long festival unites one and all in Nagaland and people enjoy the colourful performances, crafts, sports, food fairs, games and ceremonies. Traditional arts which include paintings, wood carvings, and sculptures are also on display.

Festival highlights include the traditional Naga Morungs exhibition and the sale of arts and crafts, food stalls, herbal medicine stalls, flower shows and sales, cultural medley - songs and dances, fashion shows, the Miss Nagaland beauty contest, traditional archery, Naga wrestling, indigenous games and musical concerts.

The Hornbill Festival provides a colourful mixture of dances, performances, crafts, parades, games, sports, food fairs and religious ceremonies. The festival both exposes the culture and tradition of ethnic peoples, and reinforces Nagaland’s identity as a unique state in India’s federal union. Experts have commented that a lot of older folk in the villages travel to Kohima to attend this festival and meet people from other villages from Nagaland because they haven’t met before, hence leading to cultural assimilation.

Traditional arts are also featured, with paintings, wood carvings, and sculptures by modern Naga artists on display. Naga troupes sing folk songs, perform traditional dances and play indigenous games and sports. In the evenings a programme of music concerts, catering for all tastes, ensures that the festive spirit continues through the night. One of the major highlights of this festival is the Hornbill International Rock Festival, which is held at Indira Gandhi Stadium; local and international rock bands perform.

== Economic potential ==
The Hornbill Festival has contributed significantly to enhancing the state's tourism brand. Tourism promoters believe that the Hornbill Festival in Nagaland allows tourists to have an insight into the different ethnic groups of Nagaland. It fosters understanding of the rich cultural heritage of the state, its resourceful architecture and its ethnic cuisine.

== Gallery ==
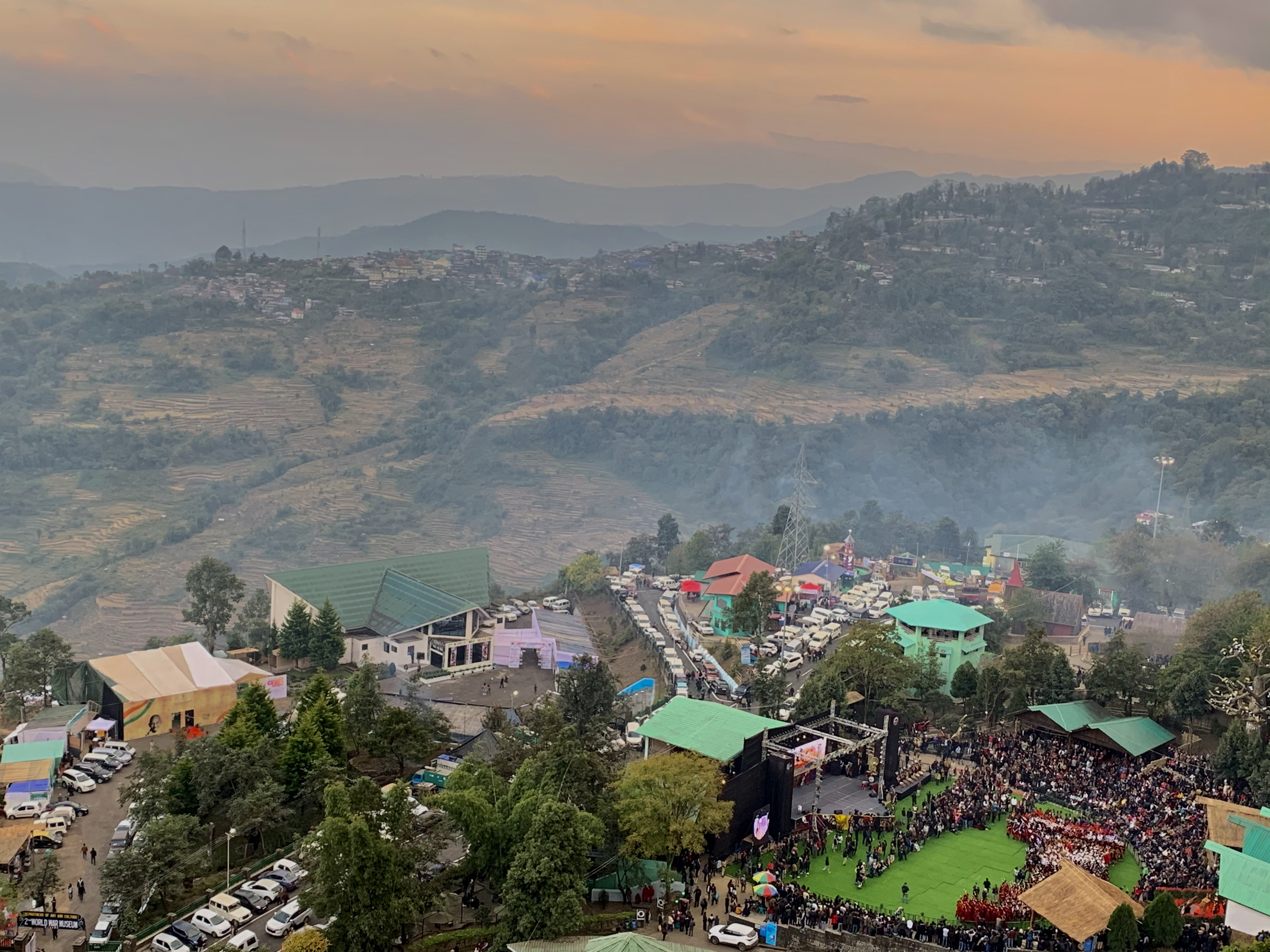
Main arena at the Kisama Heritage Village

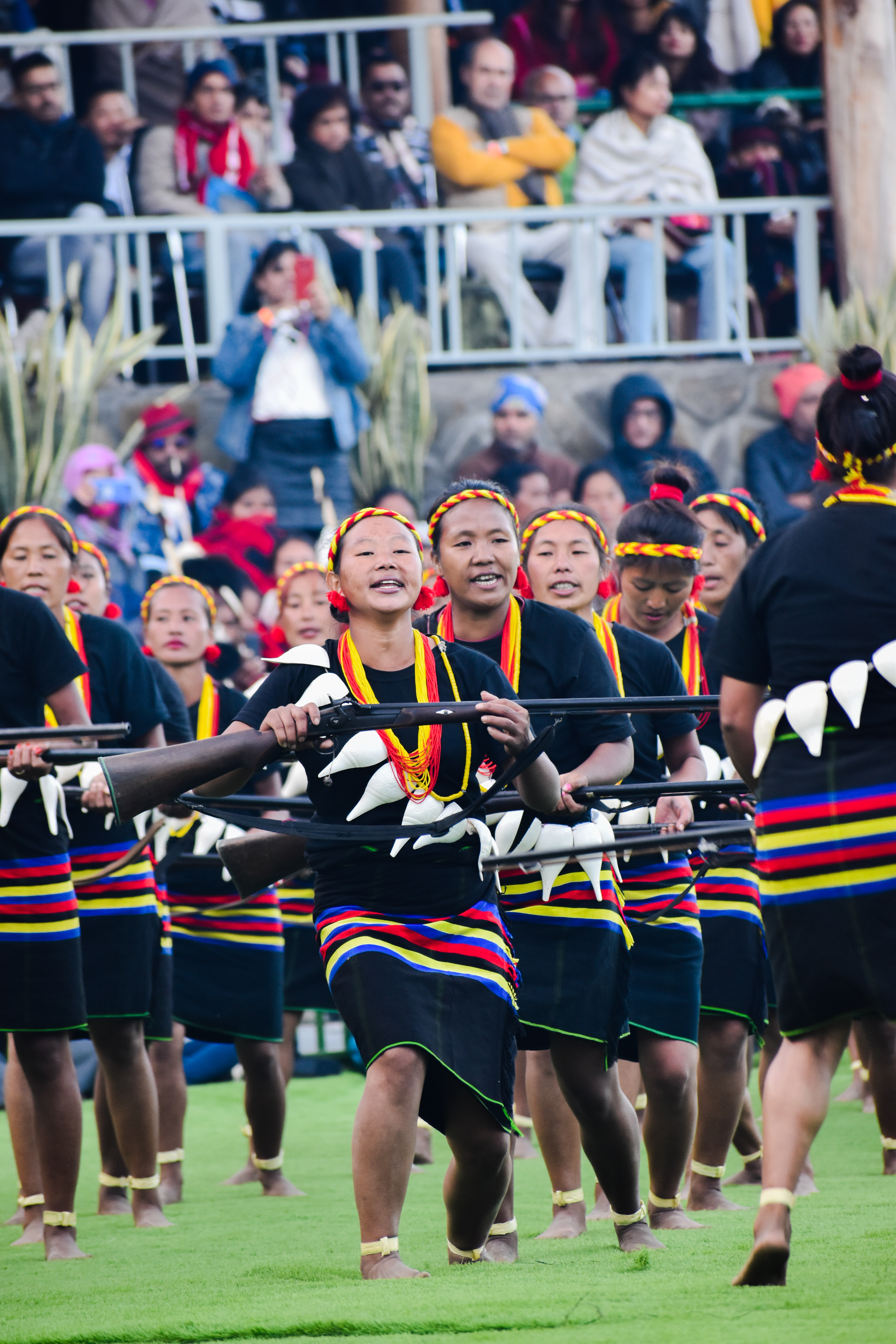
Konyak Naga women performing an ethnic dance

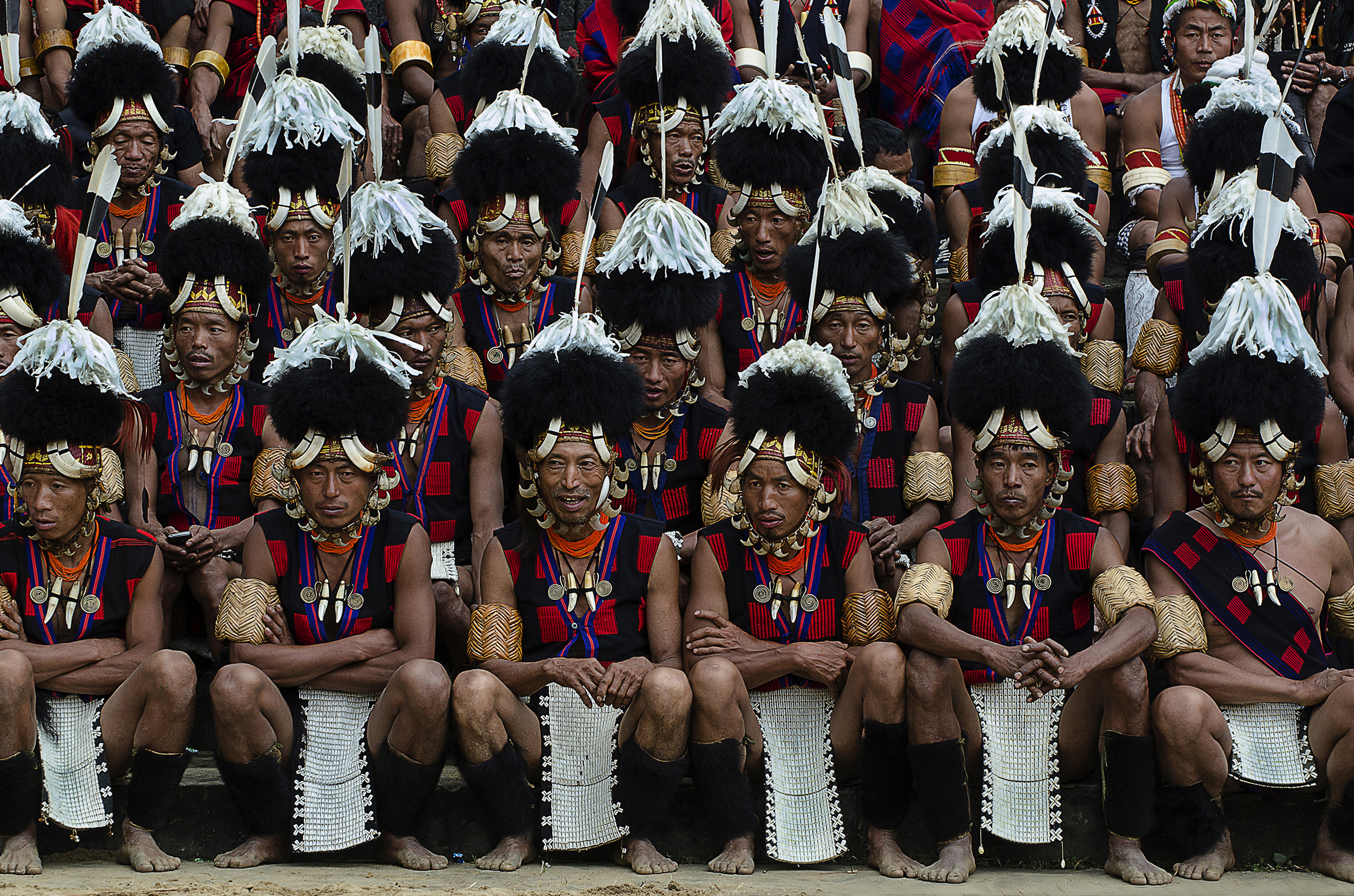
Chang Naga cultural troupe waiting to perform

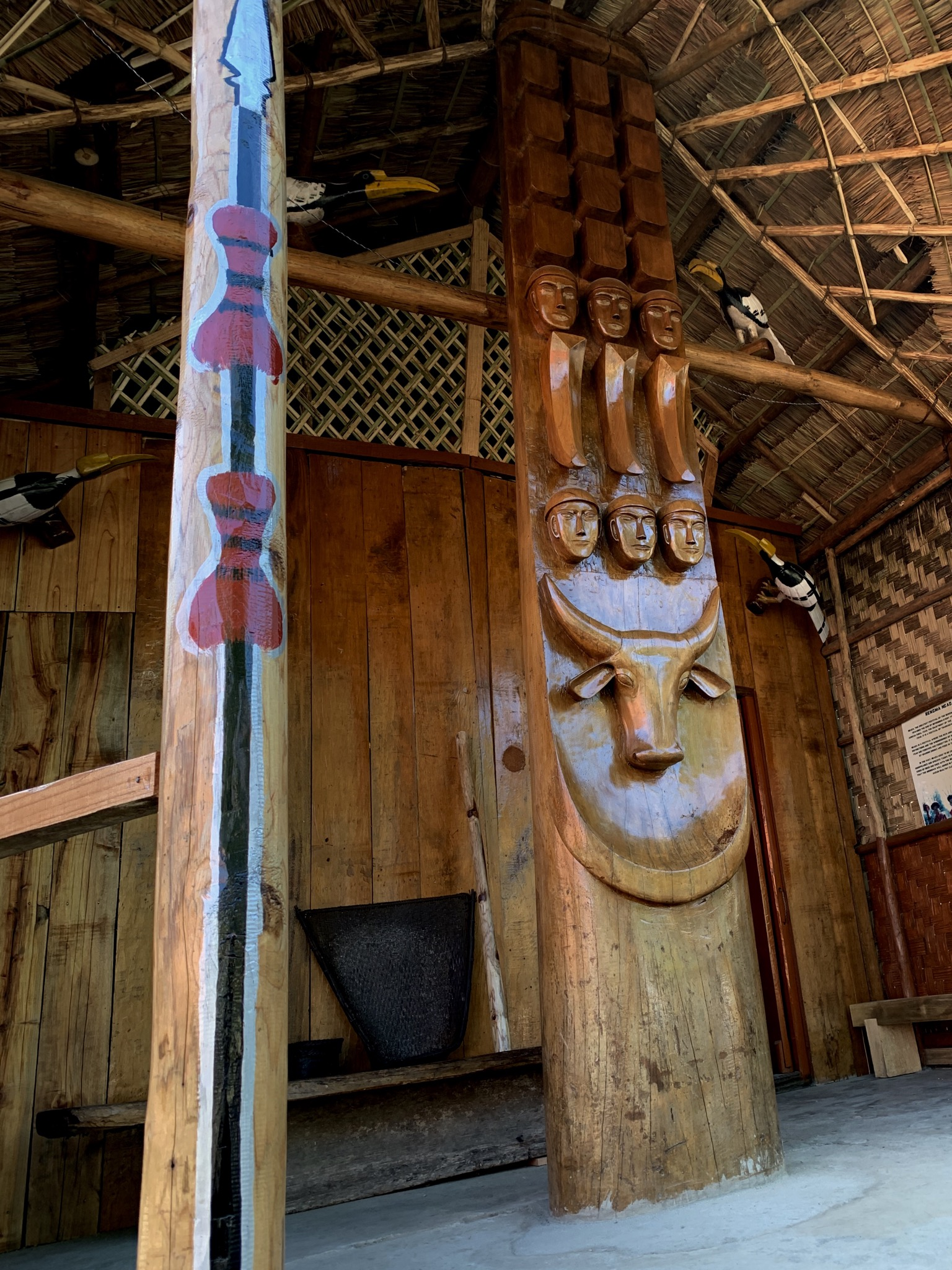
Entrance of the Rengma Naga Morung at the Kisama Heritage Village

== See also ==
- Lui Ngai Ni, an inter-ethnic festival celebrated by the Nagas of Manipur
