= Chiithuni =

Festival celebrated by the Mao Naga tribe

Chiithuni Festival is a major festival celebrated by the Mao Naga tribe. The festival is usually held for 6 days from the 25th day of Chuthunikhro (January). The festival is held to mark the end of the harvest period and the beginning of a new period.

== Rituals ==
Chiithuni Festival marks the end of a year and the beginning of a new year. The festival is held over a period of 6 days with each day holding an important function. It is believed that the rituals practised during the festival are a means for the villagers to request the gods and their ancestors to guide them throughout the year.

The first day of the festival is the preparatory day known as Nisha. The villagers must prepare themselves with a clean heart. They also keep themselves extremely clean by taking regular baths and cleaning all their belongings. Rice beer is prepared beforehand on the 18th day of Chuthunikhro and neighbours sit around to taste it.

The second day is known as Niji. It is on this day that the main feast takes place. Meat is cooked and distributed. The patriarch of the family then proceeds to offer some of the cooked meat to the gods. In the evening, a huge bonfire is created and the villagers' feast, sing, and dance.

The third day, called Oshu Kope, is an important day in terms of the various ceremonies conducted. All the villagers gather in the morning and then go to the jungle to chase and hunt birds with their bare hands. The person who catches the first bird is considered the luckiest person of the year. The third day of the festival is also considered auspicious for women who are married. They are invited to their ancestral home and returned to their husband's home with a strip of meat and rice beer as a gift that signifies the eternal family bond.

On the fourth, fifth, and sixth day of Chiithuni, festivities are held throughout the day. People feast, drink local-made rice beer and celebrate with songs, dance, and traditional games.

On the first day of the following month, Chisiilopra (February), all the men and women of the village don their traditional attires with their weapons (for the men) and baskets (for the women). Then they go on a procession to a designated spot on a hill to mark the end of the festival. After reaching the spot, the young men play traditional games to show off their prowess and abilities. On this day it is believed that everyone must come home before the sun sets or there will be severe consequences that would lead to death in the village.

With the acceptance of Christianity, the festival has taken a more toned-down level. The blessing of the gods and forefathers have been replaced with praying for blessings from God and many traditional games have been replaced by modern games
