= Index of Angami-related articles =

The following is an list of articles relating to Angami Nagas of Nagaland, India, sorted in alphabetical order.

== A ==
- Andrea Kevichüsa
- Angami Baptist Church Council
- Angami language
- Angami Naga
- Angami Naga Sign Language
- Angami–Pochuri languages
- Angami Public Organization
- Angami name
- Angami Women Organization

== B ==
- Bade, Chümoukedima District

== C ==
- Capi
- Chalie Kevichüsa
- Chathe
- Chiephobozou
- Chümoukedima

== D ==
- Dzüko Valley

== E ==
- Easterine Kire

== G ==
- Galho

== H ==
- Holshe Khrie-o
- Hovithal Sothu

== J ==
- Jakhama
- John Bosco Jasokie
- Jotsoma

== K ==
- Kene (Naga wrestling)
- Kevichüsa Angami
- Kewhira Dielie
- Kezol–tsa Forest
- Khonoma
- Khrielie-ü Kire
- Khriehu Liezietsu
- Khuzama
- Kigwema
- Kirha
- Kiyanilie Peseyie
- Kohima Village
- Koso (Naga surname)
- Kropol Vitsü
- Kuda, Dimapur

== L ==
- List of people of Angami descent
- Lohepfhe
- Loramhoushü

== M ==
- Medziphema
- Methaneilie Solo
- Mezoma
- Mount Japfü
- Mount Tempü

== N ==
- Neidonuo Angami
- Neikezhakuo Kengurüse
- Neiliezhü Üsou
- Neiphiu Rio

== P ==
- Pcheda
- Pfütsana
- Pulie Badze

== R ==
- Razhukhrielie Kevichüsa
- Reivilie Angami
- Rokonicha Kuotsü

== S ==
- Salhoutuonuo Kruse
- Sekrenyi
- Sesino Yhoshü
- Shürhozelie Liezietsu
- Sopfünuo
- Southern Angami
- Sovima
- Swe–ba

== T ==
- Tati (instrument)
- Te–l Khukhu
- Tenyiphe I
- Tenyiphe II
- Terhüchü
- Teyozwü Hill
- Theja Rio
- Thepfülo-u Nakhro
- Thuthse
- Tseilhoutuo Rhütso
- Tubu Kevichüsa

== V ==
- Vikho-o Yhoshü
- Virazouma
- Viseyie Koso
- Viswema
- Viswesül Pusa
- Vizadel Sakhrie
- Vizol Koso

== Z ==
- Zaku Zachariah Tsükrü
- Zale Neikha
- Zapu Phizo
- Zhaleo Rio
- Zutho
