= Index of Viswema-related articles =

The following is an list of articles relating to Viswema of Nagaland, sorted in alphabetical order.

== 0–9 ==
- 2010 Mao Gate incident
- 2020–21 Dzüko Valley wildfires

== D ==
- Dzüko Valley

== H ==
- Hovithal Sothu

== J ==
- John Government Higher Secondary School

== K ==
- Kezol-tsa Forest
- Kropol Vitsu
- Koso (Angami surname)

== M ==
- Mount Tempü

== P ==
- Pcheda

== S ==
- Southern Angami II Assembly constituency
- Swe–ba

== T ==
- Te–l Khukhu
- Teyozwü Hill

== V ==
- Viseyie Koso
- Viswema
- Viswema Hall
- Viswesül Pusa
- Vizadel Sakhrie
- Vizol Koso

== Z ==
- Zaku Zachariah Tsükrü
- Zale Neikha
