= Mao–Southern Angami territorial dispute =

Border dispute between Mao and Southern Angami Naga groups

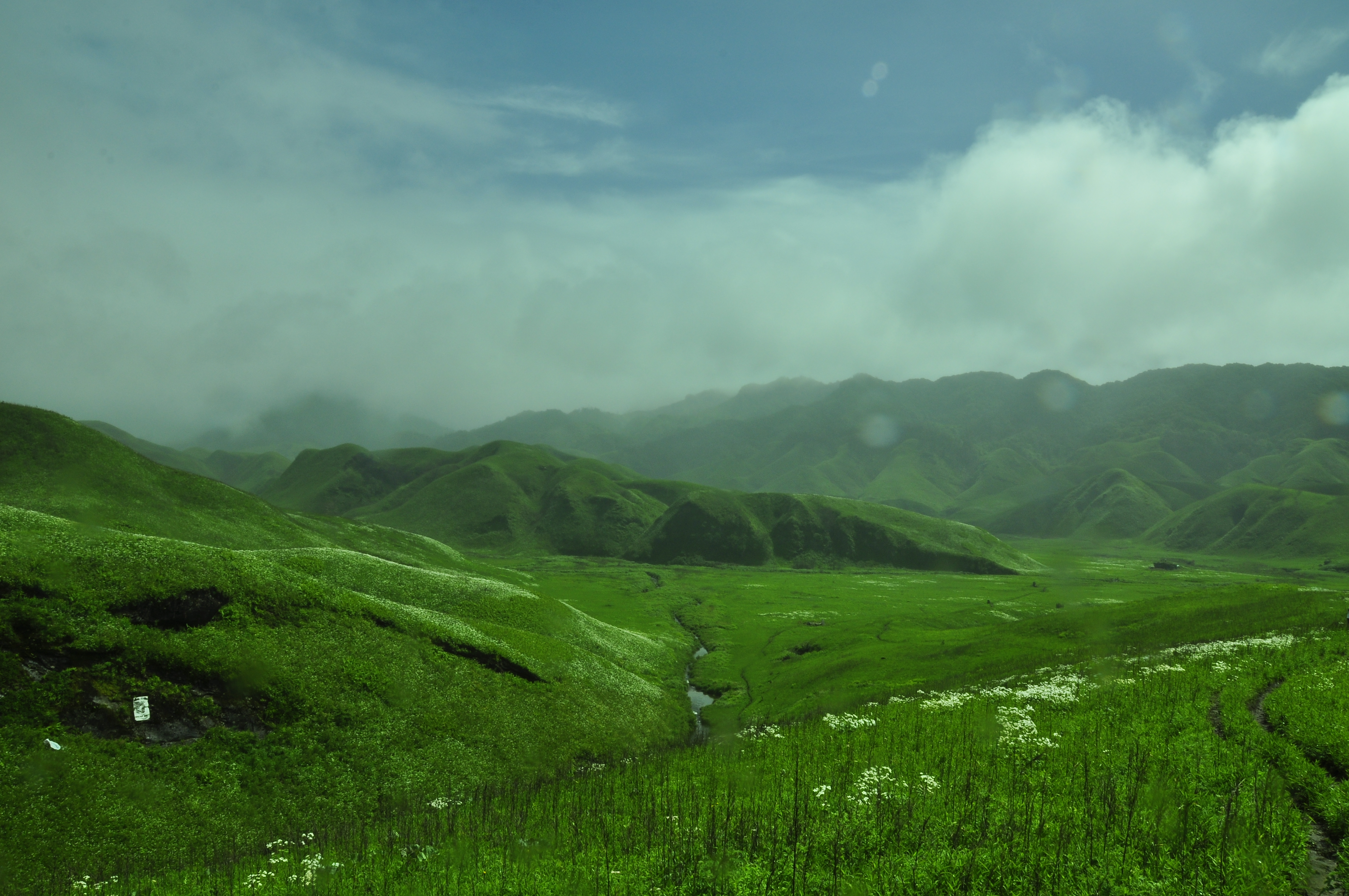
- Dzüko Valley
- Date: 1985–present
- Location: Manipur–Nagaland border, India
- Type: Territorial dispute
- Cause: Conflicting claims over customary land ownership
- Participants: Viswema (Southern Angami Nagas); Song Song (Mao Nagas); Maram Khullen (Maram Nagas)
- Outcome: Verdict passed

The Mao–Southern Angami territorial dispute is a dispute over the forested region of Kezol-tsa (also known as Koziirii/Kazing) and parts of the Dzüko Valley. It mainly involved the Mao Nagas of Manipur and the Southern Angami Nagas of Nagaland.

The disputed land is situated along the Manipur–Nagaland border. This boundary, drawn during colonial administration does not align with indigenous land ownership systems.

== Background and origins ==
The first recorded conflict over Dzüko Valley occurred in 1985, when a team of 19 individuals consisting of nine officials from the Government of Manipur and ten Mao Naga youths visited the valley. While returning through the jurisdiction of Viswema under Southern Angami, they were detained by local authorities, allegedly coerced into submitting a written apology for trespassing and subsequently handed over to the custody of the Nagaland Police.

On 11 April 2000, volunteers from Song Song village raised objections to the construction of a new rest house in Kezoltsa Forest, nearby Dzüko, undertaken under the authority of Daniel Kikhi, then Chairperson of the Viswema Village Council, to demarcate the boundary of Viswema.

On 23 November 2000, youths from Song Song village dismantled the rest house constructed by Viswema, resulting in an increased tensions between the two sides. The Tenyimi Central Union (now Tenyimi People's Organisation) intervened and was able to temporarily stabilize the situation. Subsequently, the TCU directed the Mao Council to instruct Song Song village to reconstruct the dismantled structure, stating that ‘the destroyed rest house should be re-constructed to its original shape by Songsong village within 20 (twenty) days with effect from 15th February 2001’. The rest house was re-constructed within the stipulated time.

=== 2015 memorandum and blockade ===
On 23 April 2015, the Mao Council submitted a memorandum to the Chief Minister of Manipur with the caption, "Massive Encroachment by Southern Angami People's Organization (SAPO) taking place, deep into Manipur State’s Political Boundary in the Dziiko–Koziirii Area". Following the memorandum, tensions escalated, leading the Southern Angami Public Organisation to impose an economic blockade restricting the Mao Nagas from plying the highway which passes through Southern Angami territory, disrupting transport and civilian movement.

The Naga Hoho attempted to mediate the conflict through multiple rounds of negotiation stating that it sought an amicable solution to maintain "unity and peaceful coexistence" among Nagas, citing the directive principles of its constitution. However, after these efforts failed to produce a settlement, the Naga Hoho Executive Council convened on 6 July 2015 unanimously resolved to suspend the membership of the Mao Council from the Naga Hoho. The leadership declared that the suspension would remain in force until the memorandum submitted to the Government of Manipur was withdrawn.

=== 2016 Maram Khullen intervention ===
In March 2016, Maram Khullen village of Manipur filed an application to the Tenyimi People's Organisation seeking to be impleaded as a necessary party to the case.

=== 2022–23 restrictions ===
On 21 March 2022, the Southern Angami Public Organisation called a 72-hour bandh, which restricted all movement to and from Manipur through the southern region, in protest against the construction of permanent structures and the deployment of armed personnel by the Government of Manipur in the disputed Kezoltsa area. On 23 March, SAPO extended the bandh indefinitely, citing the Manipur Government's failure to withdraw the armed personnel and structures from the area within the stipulated 72-hour period. The indefinite blockade was suspended on the 31 March following requests from the Tenyimi People's Organisation and the Angami Public Organisation (APO).

On 15 December 2022, the Southern Angami Public Organisation imposed restrictions on the movement of Mao people into its territory until the Board of Arbitration of the Tenyimi People's Organisation (TPO) resolved the disputed "traditional landholding" issue between the two communities. On 21 March 2023, acting on the guidance of its parent body, the Angami Public Organisation, the organisation lifted the restrictions.

=== 2024 developments ===
On 20 January 2024, the Angami Public Organisation issued an ultimatum to the Mao Council asking it to take full responsibility to withdraw the Manipur Police and all its security apparatus stationed at the disputed area on or before 20 February 2024. In March 2024, the Southern Angami Public Organisation directed the Mao residents living within the Angami jurisdiction to return to their native villages in accordance to customary norm, stating that the Mao Council had failed to secure the withdrawal of the Manipur security forces from the disputed area.

== Mediation efforts ==
In 2015, the Tenyimi People's Organisation appointed two members from each Tenyimi tribes as arbitrators to conciliate the dispute. Between 2016 and June 2022, more than 30 sittings were held. Drones and Helicopters were used to determine the exact location and extent of the disputed forest.

On 28 November 2017, the three contesting parties stated that they had "unanimously agreed to resolve the dispute as per the Naga Customary Law and not to resort to approach any other Court(s)."

On 19 December 2022, the Tenyimi People's Organisation (TPO) passed a judgment wherein Kezol-tsa and Dzüko Valley "shall be a common property of the Southern Angami Public Organisation (SAPO), Mao Council and Maram Khullen village." This was rejected by the Southern Angami Public Organisation and Mao Council.

== Verdict ==
On 12 July 2024, the Tenyimi People's Organisation passed the final judgement distributing and earmarking the whole forest area into three separate sections among three contesting parties—Southern Angamis of Nagaland, and the Maos and Maram Khullen of Manipur. Terming it as "final and binding on all parties". It highlighted that "if any party refuses to accept and comply with the judgment, that particular party shall cease to be a member of TPO and the remaining parties shall stand united on all issues against that party".

Earmarked areas for Southern Angami, Mao and Maram Khullen

The Mao Council on 19 July rejected the presidential council verdict of the Tenyimi People's Organisation citing it did not adhere to the fundamental principles of Tenyimi customary laws and traditional practices. The TPO granted the Mao Council an extension until 25 September for the Mao Council to resolve its internal deliberations and allowing time for the council to reach a decision. The Mao Council convened an assembly on 23 September to reconsider its position. After thorough deliberation, the council voted and resolved to accept the TPO Presidential Council's judgment and order issued on 12 July.

== See also ==
- List of territorial disputes
