= 2020–21 Dzüko Valley wildfires =

Fires in Nagaland and Manipur, India

- Date: 29 December 2020-9 January 2021

Statistics
- Burned area: 200 acres (81 ha)

The 2020–21 Dzüko Valley wildfires occurred in the states of Nagaland and Manipur in North-east India, beginning on 29 December 2020. The wildfire resulted in widespread environmental damage in the ecologically sensitive region of the Dzüko Valley, destroying 200 acres of old-growth forest. On 9 January 2021, Nagaland government officers stated that the fire had been brought under control and it was confirmed to have been doused by 11 January 2021.

== Overview ==
=== Environmental factors ===
The Dzüko Valley is an environmentally sensitive zone located in the north-eastern state of Nagaland, and bordering the state of Manipur, in India. It is located at 2452 meters above sea level, and hosts a large variety of flora and fauna, including the Dzüko lily, which is indigenous to the valley and not found elsewhere. The valley is also home to the endangered Blyth's tragopan, the state bird of Nagaland. It is popular for tourism and trekking.

The valley borders Mount Tempü, in Manipur, which is covered in a large area of old-growth forest called Kezol-tsa. The valley has experienced several wildfires before. In 2006, a wildfire damaged an area of 20 kilometers in the southern part of the valley. In 2018, a previous wildfire believed to have been caused by some tourists damaged part of the valley. The valley is disputed territory, with both states of Nagaland and Manipur claiming it as part of their land.

== Cause ==
The fire is believed to have begun on 28 or 29 December 2020. After unsuccessful attempts to control the fire on the ground, it spread southwards and to the west, across the valley towards the neighboring state of Manipur, and engulfed Mount Tempü in Manipur. On 2 January, the wildfire spread to the state of Manipur and the Manipur State Government began firefighting efforts as well. The presence of dry grass and climatic factors, including strong winds, encouraged the spread of the wildfire. Nagaland State Disaster Management Authority reported that "heavy gusty winds" were not only causing further spread of the wildfire, but were hindering firefighting efforts. The Deccan Herald reported that the wildfire had spread to the extent that it was visible from the Nagaland state capital, Kohima, which was situated 30 kilometers away.

The exact causes of the fire have not yet been determined. Nagaland State Disaster Management Authority officials have suggested that the fire occurred naturally, and was a product of the dry weather.

== Damage ==
Local tribal council leaders reported that areas of old-growth forest around Mount Tempü, as well as flora and fauna in the Dzüko Valley, had been damaged. Manipur Chief Minister N. Biren Singh reported after an aerial survey of the fire that it had "...spread quite extensively and caused serious damage on this part of mountain range." State officials from Nagaland and Manipur both confirmed that areas of old-growth forest had been destroyed by the wildfire, causing possible harm to local biodiversity. Manipur government officials stated that as of 4 January 2021, 200 acres of forest had been destroyed by the fire.

=== Casualties ===
On 4 January 2021, a member of the National Disaster Relief Force deployed for fire-fighting efforts was reported as having died at a base camp established near the Valley. The cause of death is yet to be established.

== Response ==
=== Control and Dousing ===
The initial response to the wildfire was led by local residents, and a group of 130 volunteers, accompanied by forest officials attempted to control the fire before it reached Mount Tempü across the state border, in Manipur, and damaged the old-growth forest in that region. Manual attempts to control the fire were not successful because of the steep terrain, which required firefighters to trek for several kilometers before they could reach the site of the fire.

Following unsuccessful attempts to contain the fire locally, the state of Nagaland deployed 200 firefighter and sought assistance from the Indian Army and the National Disaster Response Force (NDRF). The NDRF airlifted a team of firefighters, along with helicopters containing fire-fighting equipment, to the Dzüko Valley. In total, seven NDRF teams were deployed, with four in Manipur and three at Nagaland. Firefighting efforts were assisted by 300 local volunteers.

By 2 January 2021, the wildfire had spread across the state border of Nagaland and into Manipur, and the Manipur Government deployed air and ground forces to fight the fire. On 2 January 2021, police and military officials, along with state government officials stated that the fire had been brought under control. However, on 4 January 2021, Nagaland government officials confirmed that the wildfire had not been controlled and that they were hoping to have it under control in a few days. Strong winds inhibited firefighting efforts during this period, and access to areas of the wildfire was difficult to obtain because of the mountainous terrain.

On 3 January 2021, four Indian Air Force helicopters were deployed to assist in firefighting operations, and reported that the fire had been partially controlled in the Dzüko Valley but continued to spread in Manipur, and around Mount Tempü. A fireline of five kilometers had been cut by volunteer forces in the Dzüko Valley, which helped contain the fire within Nagaland.

On 9 January 2021, Nagaland State Forest Department officials reported that the fire had been brought under control after ten days of fire-fighting, and that firefighting teams would continue operations to ensure that the fire was completely extinguished, for a few more days. The Indian Air Force continued with the aerial survey. On 12 January 2021, two weeks after the fire began, the Nagaland government confirmed that the fire had been completely doused.

== Impact ==
On 12 January 2021, the Nagaland State Disaster Management Authority announced that they would conduct an investigation into the damage caused to the Dzüko Valley as a result of the fire. An estimated 200 acres of forest were damaged by the fire.
