= Manipuri folktales =

Manipuri folktales may refer to:

- Meitei folktales, the folktales of Meitei people, the largest ethnicity of Manipur
- Folktales of other ethnic groups in Manipur
  - Naga folktales, folktales of the Naga people living in Manipur as well as in other regions
    - Mao folktales, folktales of the Mao Naga people, an ethnic group of Manipur
