= Southern Angami Public Organisation =

Southern Angami Public Organization
- Abbreviation: SAPO
- Founded: 1944; 82 years ago
- Founded at: Viswema
- Type: Public Organization
- Headquarters: Jakhama
- Region served: Southern Angami
- Key people: Tepul Hopovi; President
- Motto: Peace and Unity

The Southern Angami Public Organization (SAPO) is a public organization established in 1944. It is the apex public organization of the Southern Angami Nagas in the Indian state of Nagaland. Its main objective is to protect and safeguard the territories of the Southern Angamis.

== See also ==
- Angami Public Organisation
