= Pfütsana =

Traditional Angami Naga indigenous religion

- Type: Ethnic religion
- Classification: Animism
- Theology: Monotheism
- God: Ukepenuopfü or Okemenüpü
- Region: Kohima District, Nagaland, India
- Language: Angami
- Members: 884 (as of 2001)
- Other name: Krüna

Pfütsana, also known as Krüna, is the traditional indigenous religion of the Angami Nagas in the Indian state of Nagaland. Before the spread of Christianity, Pfütsana was the dominant religion among the region. Today, it survives with only a very small minority of practitioners.

== Preservation ==
As Christianity became dominant among the Angami, Pfütsana declined significantly. To preserve indigenous religious traditions, the organization Japfüphiki Pfütsana was established in 1987. Today, only several adherents remain, mainly in the villages of the Southern Angamis in Kohima District.

== See also ==
- Naga folklore
