= Sopfünuo =

Naga folk tale

Folk tale
- Name: Sopfünuo
- Region: present day Nagaland and Manipur

"Sopfünuo" is an Angami Naga folktale about a woman and her child whose lives were tragically cut short on their way back to their native village in Rüsoma.

== Plot ==
Sopfünuo was a beautiful girl of Rüsoma village. She was wedded to a man of another village. As a wife, she reserved unswerving loyalty to her husband. She dressed him up with beautiful clothing. Some women could not conceal their envy of his marriage success. They instigated him to divorce his wife. Finally Sopfünuo was compelled to part with him. One night she carried her child and left her husband's house for her ancestral home holding a burning pine-torch. On the way across the difficult terrain, she was hit to death by a spike of an evil spirit. She left her child behind her. And after sometime the child was pierced to death by a rib bone of his mother decomposing corpse as she fell on it. They both got metamorphosed into stones of human shape.

Having heard of the incident, their relatives went in search of them and found the stones. They tried to pull the mother-stone alone but failed because of a fierce storm bound which signified the necessity to include the child-stone. When they were pulled together, the wind was completely calm. Sopfünuo and her child were brought to Rüsoma where they exist in the minds of the people as great legends.

== Cultural legacy ==
=== Film ===
The folktale was adapted into the 2005 Were I the Moon? The Legend of Sopfünuo, a Docu-Drama film directed by Metevinuo Sakhrie. The moon in the title serves as a metaphorical inspiration and guide through various stages of Sopfünuo's life told through dramatisation, images, original songs and interviews. The film was shot in various locations in Rüsoma and Viswema in Nagaland.

== See also ==
- Naga folklore
