= Xenophrys dzukou =

Conservation status
- Critically Endangered (IUCN 3.1)

Scientific classification
- Kingdom: Animalia
- Phylum: Chordata
- Class: Amphibia
- Order: Anura
- Family: Megophryidae
- Genus: Xenophrys
- Species: X. dzukou

Binomial name
- Xenophrys dzukou (Mahony, Kamei, Teeling & Biju, 2020)

Synonyms
- Megophrys dzukou Mahony, Kamei, Teeling & Biju, 2020

Species of frog endemic to Northeast India

Xenophrys dzukou, the Dzükou Valley horned frog, is a species of frog in the family Megophryidae. It is endemic to Northeast India and is known only from its type locality, the Dzükou Valley in Kohima district, Nagaland, at about 2,650 m (8,690 ft) above sea level, though it is expected to occur in adjacent Manipur.
