= Southern Angami =

Region in Northeast India

Southern Angami Japfüphiki
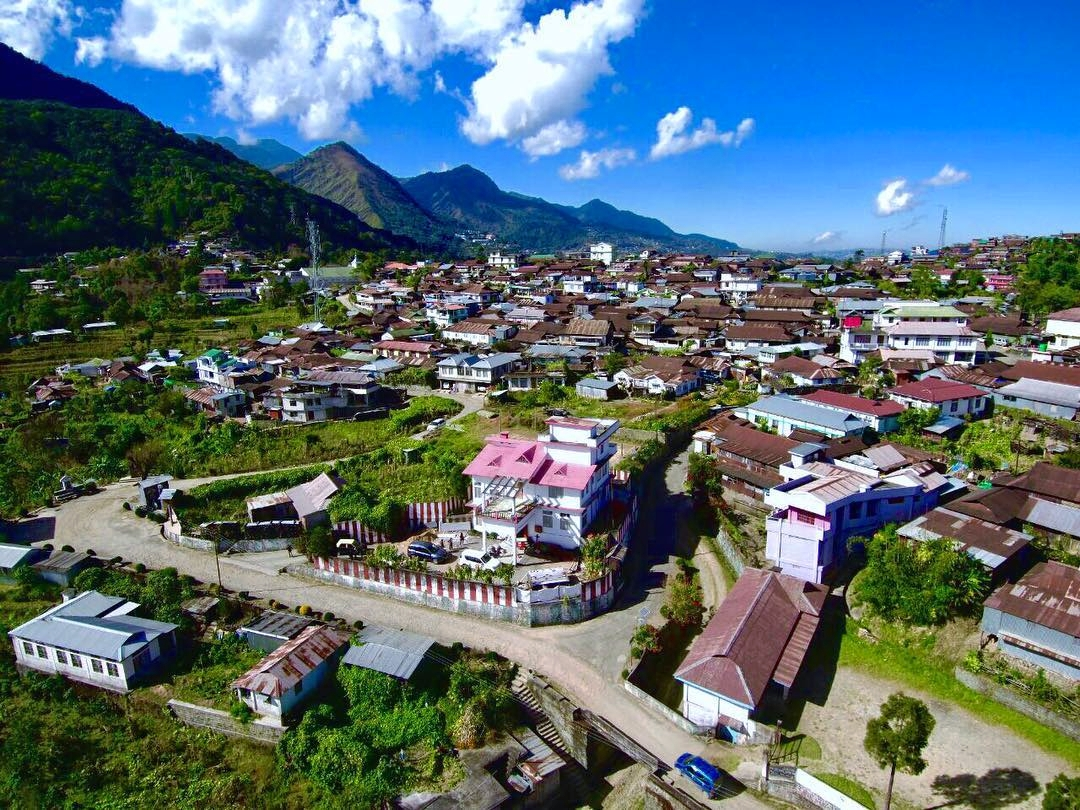
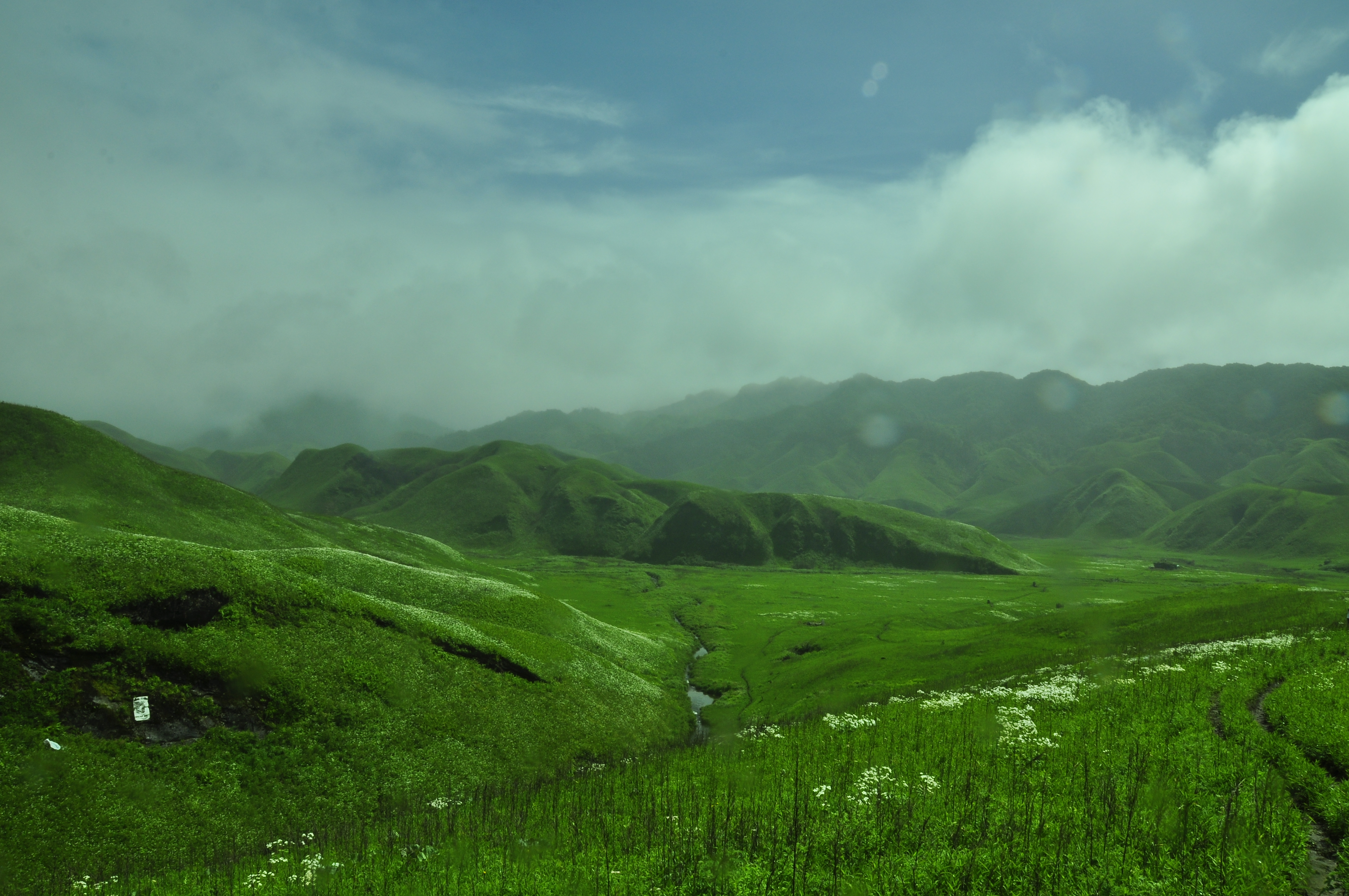
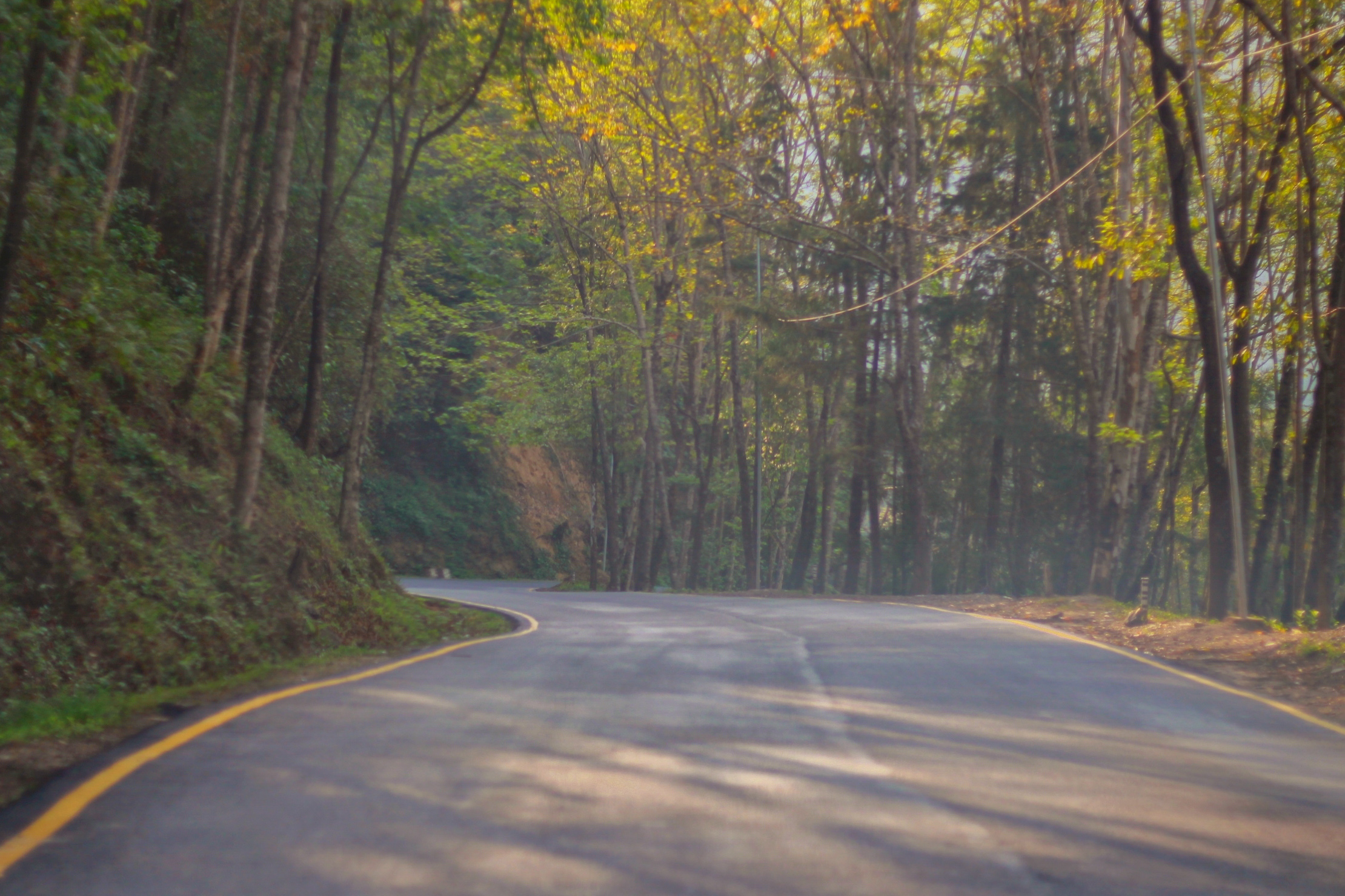
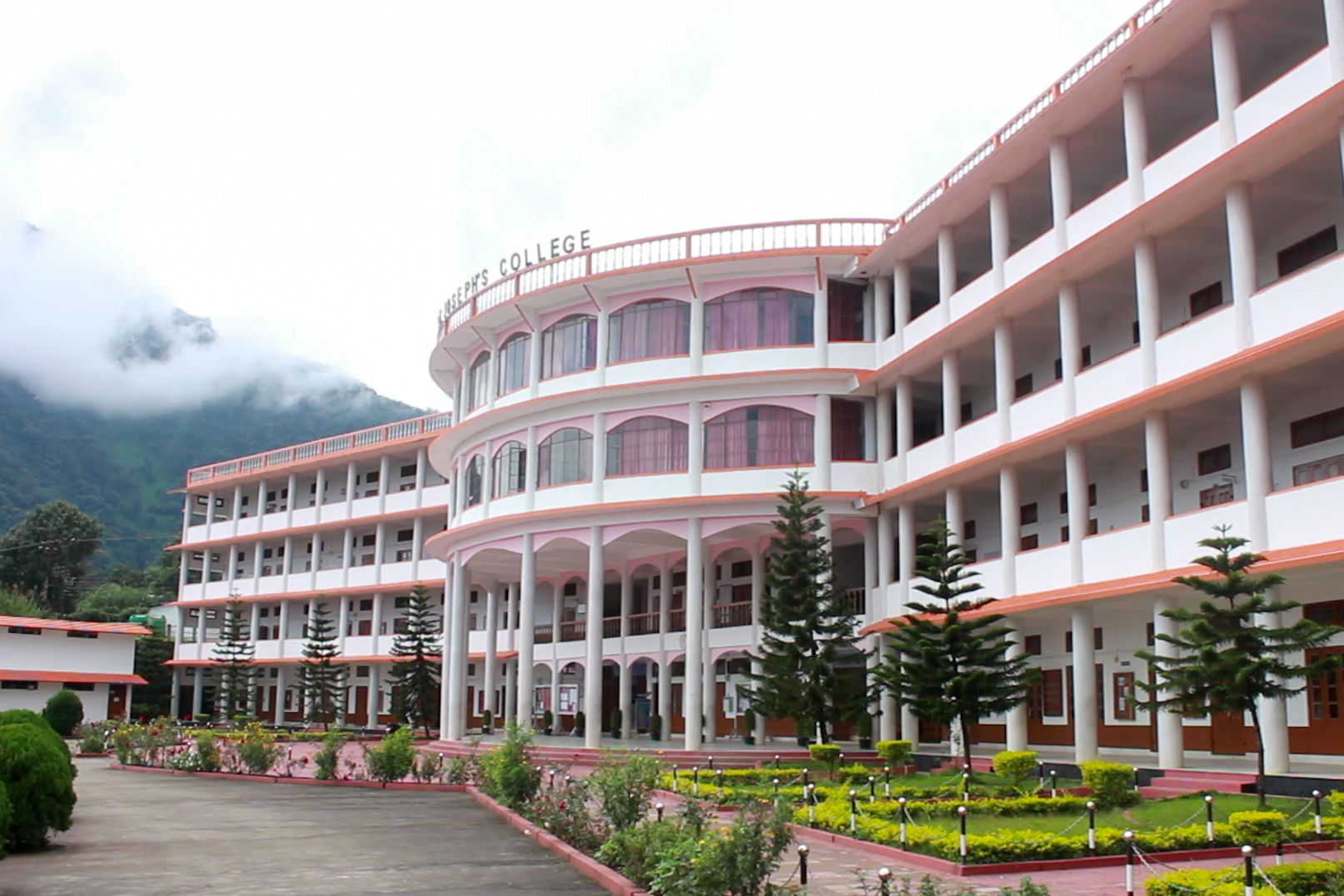
- Clockwise From Top: Viswema, one of oldest and biggest villages in Nagaland; Asian Highway 1 passing through the region; St. Joseph's College, Jakhama, the biggest college in Nagaland; Dzüko Valley
- Language(s): Keyho & Dzu-o
- Location: Nagaland; Manipur
- Parts: Foothills of Mount Tempü and Japfü
- Largest settlements: Viswema; Jakhama; Khuzama; Kigwema

Southern Angami or Japfüphiki is a geo-cultural region located in the southern part of Kohima District in the state of Nagaland in India with a portion of its territory also lying across the inter-state border in the Senapati District of Manipur.

== History ==
Kigwema and Viswema are considered to be the oldest settlements of the Angami Nagas. Numerous villages have branched out from these two ancestral settlements.

In 1944, the Southern Angami Public Organization was formed to protect and safeguard the territories of the Southern Angamis.

== Geography ==
Southern Angami region is located on the eastern part of the Barail mountain range with Mount Japfü at 3,048 m (10,000 ft) above sea level as its highest point. The region is bounded on the south by the Mao Nagas, on the south-west by the Maram Nagas, on the west by Zeliangrongs and the Western Angamis, on the north by the Northern Angamis and on the east by the Chakhesang Nagas.

=== Towns and Villages under Southern Angami ===
- Viswema
- Jakhama
- Khuzama
- Kigwema
- Phesama
- Kidima
- Mima
- Mitelephe
- Pfuchama
- Kezoma
- Chakhabama
- Kezo Town

== Culture ==
=== Events ===
- Hornbill Festival

The Hornbill Festival is held at Kisama Heritage Village every December. The festival is considered to be the biggest in Northeast India.

- St. Joseph's College, Jakhama Spring Fest

The St. Joseph's College, Jakhama Spring Fest is the biggest college fest in Nagaland.

=== Local festivals ===
- Te–l Khukhu

Te–l Khukhu is a festival that falls on 13 July (Chünyi). It is a time of giving and sharing of food with each other. This is the only festival dedicated for girls.

=== Places of interests ===
- Dzüko Valley
- Mount Japfü
- Mount Tempü
- Teyozwü Hill

== Education ==
Southern Angami region is home to some of the most prestigious educational institutions in Nagaland.

=== College and University ===
- St. Joseph's College, Jakhama
- Japfü Christian College, Kigwema

=== Schools ===
- John Government Higher Secondary School, Viswema
- St. Joseph's Higher Secondary School, Viswema
- Viswema Baptist School, Viswema
- Loyola School, Jakhama
- St. Paul School, Phesama
- Sacred Heard School, Khuzama
- Baptist Her Secondary School, Khuzama

== Politics ==
Southern Angami region of Kohima district assumes significance in the history of Nagaland Legislative Assembly as it produced the first opposition leader Vizol Koso in 1964.

The region is divided into two constituencies namely 14 AC Southern Angami—I and 15 AC Southern Angami–II.

== See also ==
- Angami Naga
- Angami language
- Chakhesang Naga
