= 2010 Mao Gate incident =

2010 incident in Manipur, India

- Top: Manipur commandos fire teargas shells to disperse protesters. Bottom: Emergency personnels extinguishing a burning security vehicle.
- Date: 6 May 2010
- Location: Mao Gate
- Caused by: Denial of entry of Thuingaleng Muivah into Manipur by the Government of Manipur.
- Result: Enforcement of martial law declared by Chief Minister Okram Ibobi Singh in Mao Gate.

Casualties
- Deaths: Two students: Dikho Loshuo (B.A second year student of St. Joseph's College, Jakhama) from Kalinamei.; Neli Chakho (B.A second year student of St. Joseph Evening College, Bangalore) from Kalinamei.

The 2010 Mao Gate incident was a public-led demonstration held in Mao Gate, Manipur, India, on 6 May 2010. The protest was started after the Government of Manipur denied the entry of Thuingaleng Muivah into the state. The protest quickly escalated to police firing when the Government of Manipur declared martial law and sent its commando to occupy the town.

== Background ==
On 5 May 2010, Thuingaleng Muivah the present General Secretary of the NSCN-IM arrived at Viswema in Nagaland on his way to his home village of Somdal in Ukhrul district of Manipur which was strongly opposed by the Manipur government. Muivah stayed overnight at Viswema which was nearby on the inter-state border.

The arbitrary decision of the government touched the core of the Naga populace as they considered this as an infringement on their rights in their own land.

== Protest development ==
The triggering point of the protest was the assault on a civilian on May 5 by security forces stationed at the Manipur-Nagaland border to prevent Muivah from entering Manipur. The assault took place when the civilian was returning home from his farm, located on the Nagaland side of the border while his residence was on the Manipur side.

== Protest escalation and firing by security forces ==
On 6 May, thousands gathered at Mao Gate to protest against the Manipur State Government's decision to prevent the entry of Muivah into Manipur but however violence broke out between the civilians and security forces stationed at the Manipur-Nagaland border.

The commandos armed with assault rifles and vehicles fired at the demonstrators and those trying to block the commando's advance into the town.

Two students—Dikho Loshuo (B.A second year student of St. Joseph's College, Jakhama) and Neli Chakho (B.A second year student of St. Joseph Evening College, Bangalore) both from Kalinamei were killed in indiscriminate firing by security forces of Manipur. Scores were injured.

== Aftermath ==
The situation became increasingly tense, which led the terrified populace around Mao Gate to evacuate to temporary camps set up at Kisama Heritage Village and Khuzama in Nagaland.
