= Naga Students' Federation =

Student organisation

- Abbreviation: NSF
- Formation: 29 October 1947; 78 years ago
- Type: Student Organization
- Headquarters: Naga Club Building, Kohima, Nagaland, India
- Region served: Northeast India: Nagaland; Manipur; Arunachal Pradesh; Assam; Northwest Burma: Naga Self-Administered Zone of Sagaing Region
- Official language: English
- President: Mteisuding Heraang
- Website: nagastudentsfederation.org
- Motto: For Unified Lim and Glory of Nagas

The Naga Students' Federation (NSF; /ˌɛn.ɛsˈɛf/) is the largest representative body for students of the Naga people. It was established on 29 October 1947.

== History ==
On 7 May 1947, student leaders from Angami, Ao, Lotha, Sümi gathered at Kohima and decided to have the inaugural session of the Naga Students' Federation on 17 May 1947. However, the proposed meeting could only be held from 29 to 30 October 1947 whereby NSF came into being under the Chairmanship of Z. Ahu.

The second session of the Naga Students' Federation was held in Mokokchung from 13 to 15 October 1948. However, after the second session the NSF went defunct for 17 years due to the rising Naga political crisis and the imposition of Army Rule in the Naga Hills.

The NSF became fully functional only in 1971.

On 20 March 1986, two students Kekuojalie Sachü and Vikhozo Yhoshü were killed in indiscriminate firing by Nagaland Police when they participated in a peaceful protest called by the NSF to rally against the state government's decision on the introduction of Indian Police Service (IPS) cadres and the extension of the Disturbed Area Belt from 5 to 20 km along the Indo-Myanmar (Indo-Burma) border. The event was so tumultuous that it led three Cabinet ministers and five state ministers of Nagaland to resign. In commemoration of the incident, the NSF Martyrs' Memorial Trophy is held annually.

== Constituent units ==
The Naga Students' Federation is composed of various tribe-based and regional student organizations, commonly referred to as its constituent units. These units represent different Naga ethnic groups and form the core membership of the federation. They are:

- Anal Lenruwl Tangpi
- Angami Students' Union
- Ao Kaketshir Telongjem
- Chakhesang Students' Union
- Lotha Students' Union
- Tangkhul Katamnao Saklong
- Lamkang Naga Students' Union
- Lotha Students' Union
- Mao Students' Union
- Maram Students' Union
- Maring Students' Union
- Monsang Naga Students' Union
- All Moyon Naga Students' Union
- Pochury Students' Union
- Poumai Naga Tsiidoumai Me
- Rengma Students' Union
- Sümi Kiphimi Küqhakulu
- All Zeliangrong Students' Union

== Executive members ==
The Naga Students' Federation executive members for the 2025–27 tenure are:

Executive Council (2025–2027)
Position	Name
President	Mteisuiding Heraang
Vice President	Vimeyiekho Vitso
Secretary - General	Kenilo Kent
Secretary - Assistant General	Veze Tünyi
Secretary - Education	Ajo Tsela
Secretary - Finance	Katho P. Awomi
Secretary - Social & Cultural	Thejalhoukho Thomas Khawakhrie
Secretary - Publicity & Information	Temjentoshi
Assembly Speaker	Marikho O. Lerüna

== Presidents ==
President	Start	End	Representing from
Z. Ahu Zinyü	1947	1947	Angami Students' Union
Sashi Aier	1948	1948	Ao Kaketshir Mungdang
Temjen Chuba	1956	1957	Ao Kaketshir Mungdang
Vamuzo Phesao	October 1965	October 1966	Chakhesang Students' Union
K. Luithui	1967	1967	Tangkhul Katamnao Saklong
Vebaizotuo	October 1971	October 1972	Angami Students' Union
Shikiho Kits	October 1972	October 1973	Sümi Students' Union
Zaku Zachariah Tsükrü	October 1973	October 1974	Angami Students' Union
Tavetzo Tetseo	October 1974	October 1975	Chakhesang Students' Union
Nrio Mürry	October 1975	October 1976	Lotha Students' Union
N. T. Nakhro	January 1976	September 1976	Angami Students' Union
T. Khonwang Konyak	September 1976	November 1976	Konyak Students' Union
Veyieta Chiero	November 1976	November 1976	Chakhesang Students' Union
Yesonu Veyie	November 1976	January 1978	Chakhesang Students' Union
Tongpang Kumba	January 1978	January 1979	Ao Kaketshir Mungdang
N. Ntsemo Ngullie	January 1979	January 1980	Lotha Students' Union
Hokheto Sema	January 1980	January 1981	Sümi Students' Union
Zhovehu Lohe	January 1981	January 1982	Chakhesang Students' Union
Tongwang Konyak	August 1982	January 1983	Konyak Students' Union
Vizolie Sorhie	January 1983	February 1985	Angami Students' Union
P. Ayangba Aonok	February 1985	February 1987	Ao Kaketshir Mungdang
Chokhriveyi Venyo	February 1987	January 1989	Chakhesang Students' Union
Rüguozelie Paphino	January 1989	April 1991	Angami Students' Union
K. Temjen Jamir	April 1991	February 1993	Ao Kaketshir Mungdang
Y. Vikheho Swu	February 1993	February 1995	Sümi Students' Union
Neiba Kronu	February 1995	June 1997	Chakhesang Students' Union
P. Chuba Ozüküm	June 1997	May 1999	Ao Kaketshir Mungdang
N. S. N. Lotha	May 1999	April 2001	Lotha Students' Union
Vipopal Kintso	April 2001	May 2003	Angami Students' Union
Achumbemo Kikon	May 2003	May 2005	Lotha Students' Union
V. Phushika Awomi	May 2005	May 2007	Sümi Students' Union
Imchatoba Imchen	May 2007	May 2009	Ao Kaketshir Mungdang
Mütsikhoyo Yhobu	May 2009	May 2011	Chakhesang Students' Union
Kelhouneizo Yhome	May 2011	May 2013	Angami Students' Union
Tongpang Ozüküm	May 2013	June 2015	Ao Kaketshir Mungdang
Subenthung Kithan	June 2015	June 2017	Lotha Students' Union
Kesosül Christopher Ltu	June 2017	May 2019	Angami Students' Union
Ninoto Awomi	May 2019	April 2021	Sümi Students' Union
Kegwayhun Tep	April 2021	August 2023	Rengma Students' Union
Medovi Rhi	August 2023	August 2025	Chakhesang Students' Union
Mteisuding Heraang	August 2025	Incumbent	All Zeliangrong Students' Union

== See also ==
- Naga Students' Union, Delhi
- Northeast Students' Organization
- All Assam Students' Union
- Student activism
