= Pcheda =

Pcheda is a traditional Indian game held in Viswema, Nagaland that requires players to throw thin bamboo sticks from a set distance. An open competition is held annually in the month of January.

== Game ==
Pcheda is played with thin dried bamboo sticks called Opche. The players are divided into two teams and compete to throw the bamboo stick the furthest distance possible from a platform on solid mud. The winner is the team which throws the stick the furthest distance.

== See also ==
- List of traditional Naga games and sports
