= Nagaland State Disaster Management Authority =

- नागालैंड राज्य आपदा प्रबंधन प्रभाग

Agency overview
- Formed: 2011
- Type: Government department
- Jurisdiction: Government of Nagaland
- Headquarters: Nagaland Civil Secretariat, Kohima
- Employees: 45
- Agency executives: Neiphiu Rio, Chief Minister & Chairman, NSDMA; Temjen Toy, Chief Secretary & Chairman, SEC; Abhijit Sinha, Principal Secretary & CEO, NSDMA; Lhouchalie Viya, Secretary, NSDMA; Johnny Ruangmei, Officer on Special Duty
- Parent department: Home Department, Govt of Nagaland
- Website: nsdma.nagaland.gov.in

Nagaland State Disaster Management Authority (NSDMA) is a government agency under Ministry of Home Affairs (India). It aims to coordinate response to natural or man-made disasters and for capacity-building in disaster resiliency and crisis response in Nagaland state of India. NSDMA was established in the year 2011 under Home Department, Government of Nagaland.

== History ==
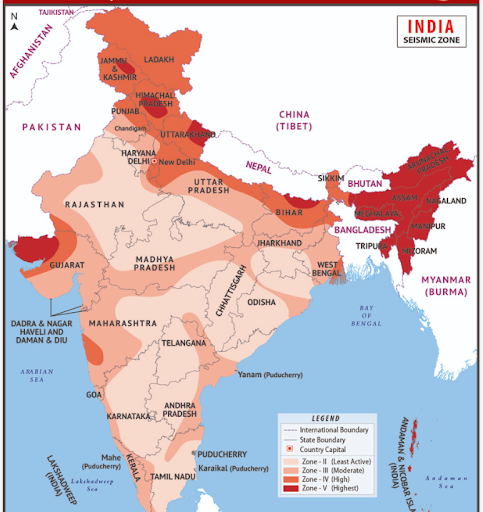
Nagaland falls under Zone 5 for earthquake risk in India

Nagaland falls under zone 5 and is referred as "Very High Damage Risk Zone" given by Bureau of Indian Standards (BIS).

Though the Government of India passed the Disaster Management Act in 2005, the Nagaland State Disaster Management Authority (NDSMA) was formed only in 2011. The body consists of Nagaland Chief Minister as its chairperson, the state chief secretary as the chief executive officer, home commissioner as the secretary, and ministers with the following portfolios: home; finance; health and family welfare; agriculture; planning and co-ordination; forest, environment and climate change; law and justice; and public works.

NSDMA staff consists of a state project officer (recruited by United Nations Development Programme), and its secretariat is headed by the Home Commissioner as Chief Executive Officer, and a secretary for administrative purposes. NSDMA also consists of officers (on attachment) from line departments and also contractual technical staff to carry out the various functions of NSDMA. At the district level, the District Disaster Management Authority (DDMA) is headed by the Deputy Commissioner as the Chairman along with a District Disaster Management Officer (DDMO) and a District Project Associate (DPA) for each district.

== See also ==
- National Disaster Response Force
- National Disaster Management Authority (India)
