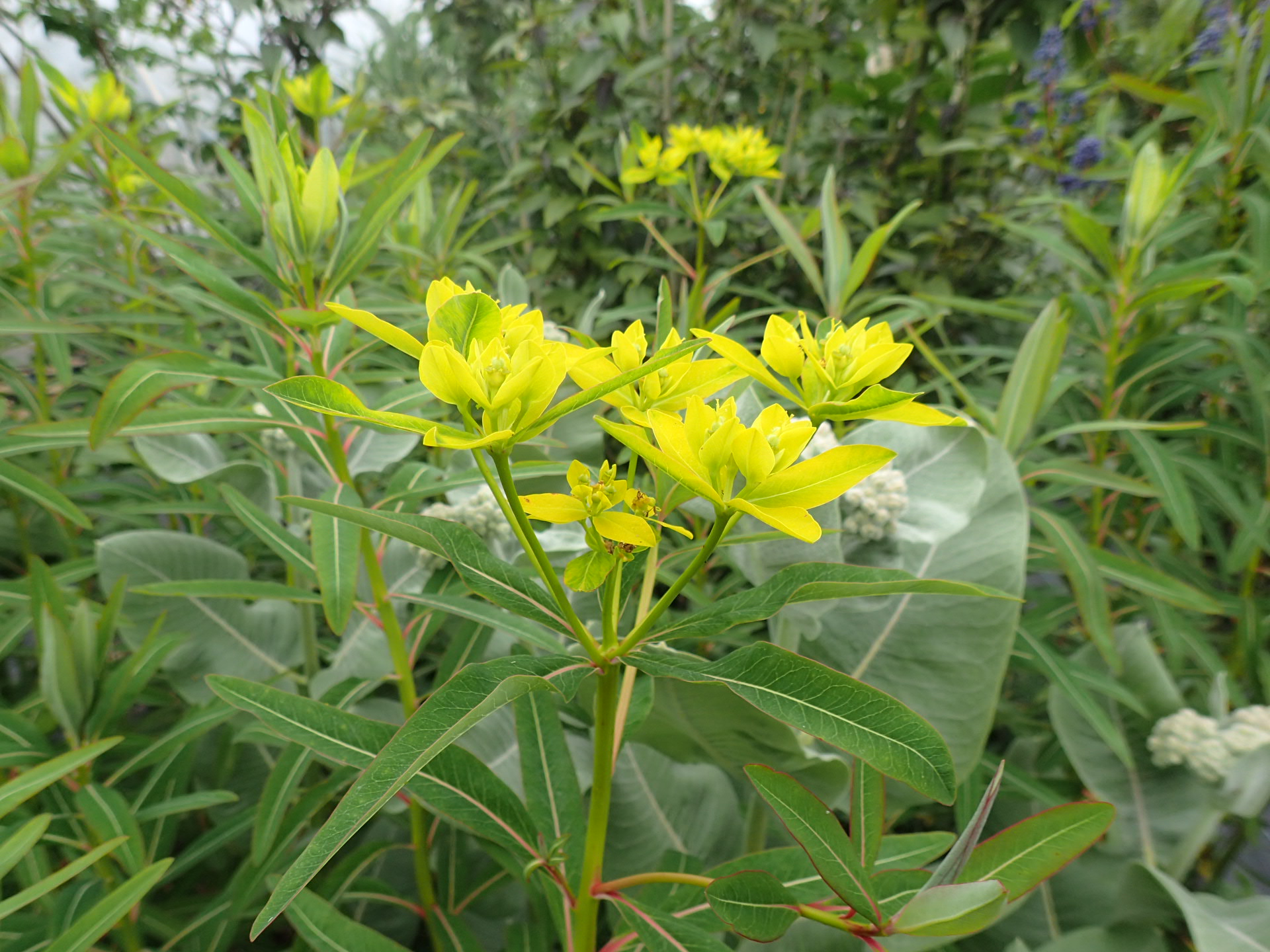

Scientific classification
- Kingdom: Plantae
- Clade: Tracheophytes
- Clade: Angiosperms
- Clade: Eudicots
- Clade: Rosids
- Order: Malpighiales
- Family: Euphorbiaceae
- Genus: Euphorbia
- Species: E. sikkimensis

Binomial name
- Euphorbia sikkimensis Boiss.

Synonyms
- Euphorbia chrysocoma H.Lév. & Vaniot; Tithymalus sikkimensis (Boiss.) Hurus. & Yu.Tanaka

= Euphorbia sikkimensis =

Species of flowering plant

Euphorbia sikkimensis, called the Sikkim spurge, is a species of flowering plant in the genus Euphorbia, native to Nepal, the eastern Himalayas, Tibet, south-central and southeast China, Myanmar, and Vietnam. It grows in alpine meadows, sparse forests, and scrub. It has gained the Royal Horticultural Society's Award of Garden Merit.
