= Angami Women Organisation =

Indian public organisation

- Abbreviation: AWO
- Formation: 1980; 46 years ago
- Type: Public Organisation
- Headquarters: Kohima
- Region served: Angami Region, India
- Key people: Neithono Sothu; President

The Angami Women Organisation (AWO), formerly known as Angamimiapfü Mechü Krotho, is a women's organisation. It is the apex women organisation of the Angami Nagas.

== History ==
Founded as Angamimiapfü Mechü Krotho, the organisation was renamed as Angami Women Organisation in 2022.

In 2023, former President of the Angami Women Organisation, Salhoutuonuo Kruse, was one of the first two women from Nagaland to be elected to the Nagaland Legislative Assembly. Kruse also became the first female cabinet minister in Nagaland.

== Presidents ==
President	Tenure	Reference
Neithonuo Sothu	2024–Incumbent	
Neilhuzono Nagi	2021–2024	
Ruokuoheü Miachieo	201?–2021	
Salhoutuonuo Kruse	2011–2014	
Medovino Dolie	2007–2011	
Kevinourheno Seyie	2004–2007	

== See also ==
- Angami Public Organisation
