= Pulie Badze Wildlife Sanctuary =

Wildlife sanctuary in Nagaland, India

- IUCN category IV (habitat/species management area)
- Location within Nagaland Location within India
- Interactive map of Pulie Badze Wildlife Sanctuary
- Location: Kohima District, Nagaland
- Nearest city: Kohima
- Coordinates: 25°38′53″N 94°4′21″E
- Area: 9.23 km^{2} (3.56 sq mi)
- Established: 1980; 46 years ago
- Governing body: Government of Nagaland

Pulie Badze Wildlife Sanctuary is located in Kohima District of Nagaland. It was first designated as a protected area in 1980. The park is named after the 2,296-metre (7,533 ft) mountain Pulie Badze, which means "Pulie's Seat", named after the legendary folktale character "Pulie".

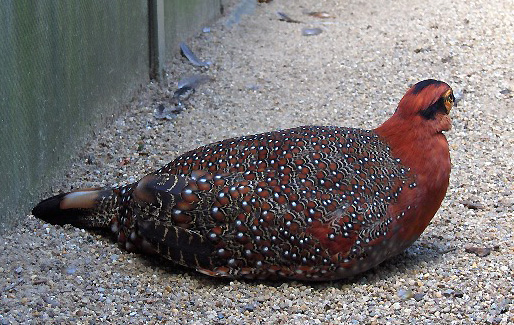
The sanctuary is home to Blyth's tragopan, Nagaland's state bird.

The park is home to a vast variety of birds like Tragopan Blythii (the state bird of Nagaland), White-naped Yuhina and Dark-rumped swift. The park has various tourist amenities such as campgrounds, walking paths, etc.
