= Angami Public Organisation =

Indian organisation

- Abbreviation: APO
- Founded: 8 April 1972; 54 years ago
- Headquarters: Kohima
- Region served: Angami Region, India
- Key people: Thejao Vihienuo; President
- Motto: Right is Might

The Angami Public Organisation (APO) is a public organisation based in the Indian state of Nagaland. Headquartered in Kohima, it was established on 8 April 1972 and serves as the apex organisation of the Angami Nagas.

The organisation often engages with government authorities and other tribal bodies on matters such as development, land rights and peace initiatives in the region.

== History ==
Angami Public Organisation was founded on 8 April 1972 with Zapuvisie Lhousa as its first president.

== Member organisations ==
The Angami Public Organisation comprises several area-based public organisations representing different regions of the Angamis. These constituent bodies form the core structure of the APO and participate in its deliberations and decision-making. They are:

- Chakhroma Public Organisation
- Northern Angami Public Organisation
- Southern Angami Public Organisation
- Western Angami Public Organisation

== Frontal organisations ==
The APO works in coordination with various frontal organisations which function as affiliated bodies and assist in addressing issues related to their respective groups. They are:

- Angami Gazetted Officers' Krotho
- Angami Sports Association
- Angami Students' Union
- Angami Women Organisation
- Angami Youth Organisation

== Presidents ==
President	Tenure	Reference
Thejao Vihienuo	2024–Incumbent	
Razouvotuo Chatsu	2021–2024	
Kepelhusie Terhüja	2018–2021	
Vilhusa Seleyi	2015–2018	
Keneingunyü Sekhose	2011–2015	
Kekhriengulie Linyü	2008–2011	
Mhiesizokho Zinyü	2005–2008	
Vipose Zao	2002–2005	
Kewhilhou Miachieo	1999–2002	
Neidilie Kuotsu	1997–1999	
Krurovi Peseyie	1996–1997	
Abi Yalie	1992–1996	
Zaku Zachariah Tsükrü	1990–1992	
Kerisal Kenna-o	1988–1990	
P. Vikuolie Pienyü	1987–1988	
Joshua Kire	1984–1987	
Thinuoselie Keyho	1980–1984	
Setu Liegise	1975–1980	
Zapuvisie Lhousa	1972–1975	

== See also ==
- Naga Hoho
