= Viswema Hall =

Multi-purpose arena

General information
- Type: multi-purpose hall
- Location: Swe–ba ward, Viswema, Nagaland
- Construction started: 2020; 6 years ago
- Inaugurated: 11 March 2024; 2 years ago

Other information
- Seating capacity: 3200–5000

The Viswema Hall is a multi-purpose arena in Swe–ba ward, Viswema, Nagaland, India. Construction began in 2020. The arena host various sporting events, music concerts, meetings, etc.

== Hall ==
The multi-purpose hall has a stage area of 200 sq ft and accommodate over 3200 persons during sport events and about 5000 persons during social and cultural events. It also serve as a local community center.
