= Zaku Zachariah Tsükrü =

Indian public and student leader

President of Naga Students' Federation
- In office October 1973 – October 1974

Vice President of Naga People's Front
- In office May 2013 – September 2017

President of Angami Public Organisation
- In office 1990–1992

Personal details
- Born: Zaku Zachariah Tsükrü; 11 March 1947 Viswema, Naga Hills District, Assam Province, British India (Now in Nagaland, India)
- Died: 17 September 2017 (aged 70) Kohima, Nagaland, India
- Children: 3
- Education: John Government High School

Zaku Zachariah Tsükrü (11 March 1947 – 17 September 2017) was an Indian public and student leader. He served as the president of the Naga Students' Federation from 1973 to 1974 and the president of the Angami Public Organisation from 1990 to 1992. Tsükrü also served as the vice-president of the Naga People's Front.

== Early life ==
Zaku Zachariah Tsükrü was born on 11 March 1947 to an Angami Naga family from Viswema. Tsükrü did his early education from John Government High School in Viswema and later completed his graduation from St. Anthony College in Shillong.

== Career ==
Tsükrü served as president of Naga Students' Union, Shillong. Later, he served as the President of the Angami Public Organization and the Naga Students' Federation.

In May 2013, Tsükrü was appointed as the vice-president of the Naga People's Front.

== Death ==
Tsükrü died on 17 September 2017 at Kohima's Bethel Medical Centre, aged 70.
