= Te-l Khukhu =

Annual festival held in Viswema, Nagaland, India

- Observed by: Viswe-mi people
- Type: Cultural
- 2026 date: Monday, 27 July
- Frequency: Annual

Te-l Khukhu is an annual festival held in Viswema, Nagaland, India on the 13th of Chünyi (July). It is celebrated by the sharing of food and particularly associated with young women.

== Legend ==
One day a young woman saw a ripe millet plant (othsü bo) in the middle of a large pond (zabe). She sent a squirrel (teli) to pluck an ear for her, but the squirrel did not return. Then she sent a parrot (oka), but the bird instead started eating the millet. Finally, the woman asked a toad (te-l) to help, and the toad brought her an ear of millet. In gratitude, she promised the toad a serving of millet every year. Thus the Toad Serving (Te-l Khukhu) festival came into being. Millet remains a very important ingredient in the preparation of festival food.

== Customs ==
Celebrations start with the collection of wildflowers by young women to decorate a chosen house (chokrwu, specifically the eaves at the entrance). The most commonly used flowers are ginger and rock butterfly lilies (khwüso and phakü pü), tender maize (tsakoshe pitha nü) and terü su. Animistic rituals were once performed, but disappeared with the advent of Christianity. Modern traditions focus on sharing and social bonds.

== See also ==
- List of traditional Naga festivals
