= Teyozwü Hill =

Hill in Viswema, Nagaland

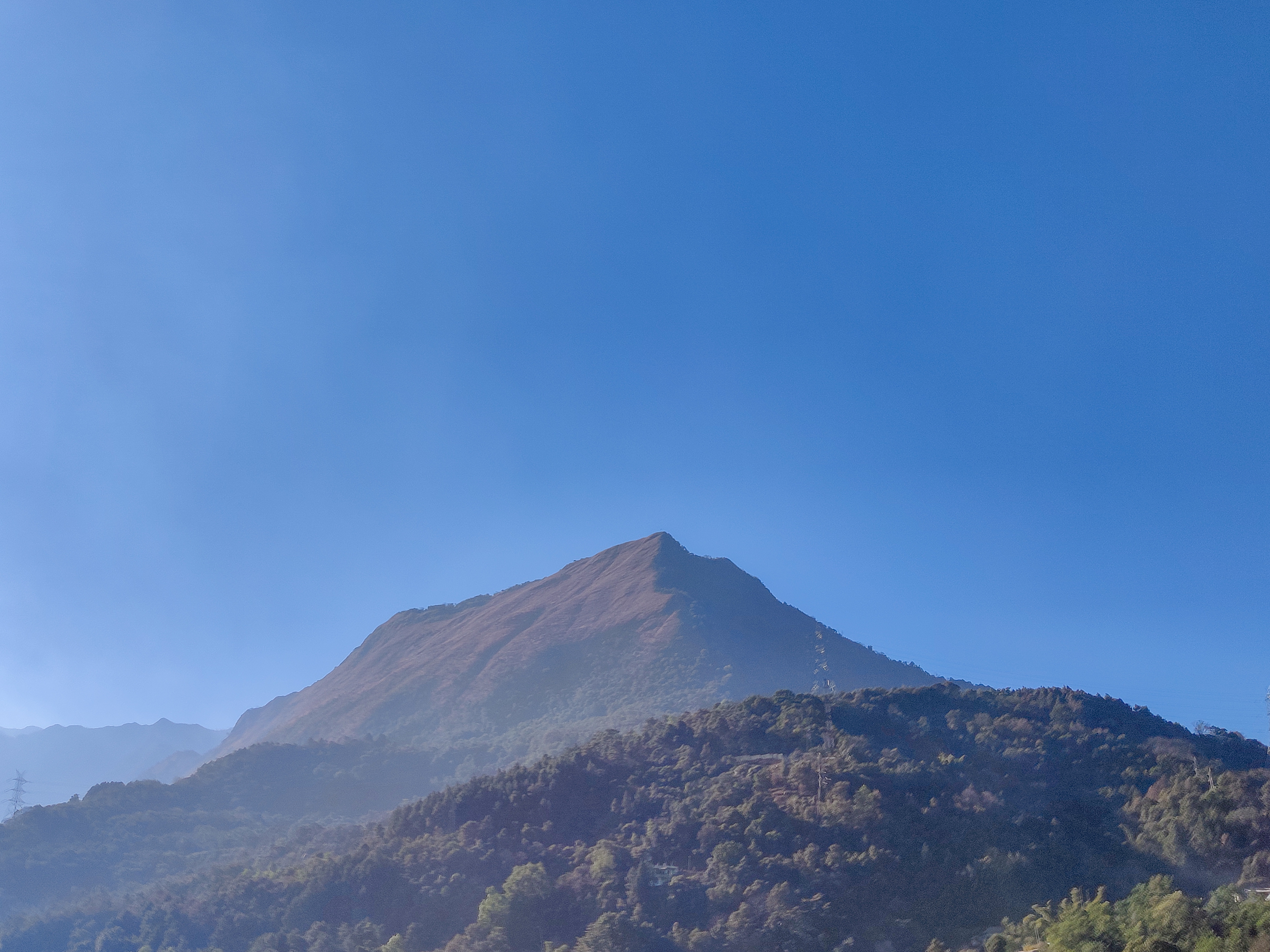
- View of Teyozwü Hill from Viswema

Highest point
- Elevation: 2,414 m (7,920 ft)
- Coordinates: 25°33′37″N 94°07′31″E

Geography
- Location within Nagaland Location within India Location within Asia Location within Earth
- Location: Viswema, Nagaland, India

Teyozwü Hill is a picturesque hill located in the western part of Viswema in the Indian state of Nagaland.

Some residents of Viswema find the morning view refreshing even before their regular cup of tea, and visitors can climb the hill before dawn to watch sunrise.

== Access ==
The hill can be reached by taking a diversion near the Dzüko Entry Point at the Viswema–Dzüko route and hiking over well marked trails. The trip from Viswema to the hill and back will generally take about 4 hours.

== See also ==
- Dzüko Valley
- Mount Tempü
