= John Government Higher Secondary School =

Location
- Swe–ba Ward, Viswema, Nagaland, India
- Coordinates: 25.570510°N 94.135716°E

Information
- Type: Government
- Established: 1945; 81 years ago
- Grades: 6 – 12
- Gender: Coeducational
- Age: 12 to 18
- Affiliation: Nagaland Board of School Education (NBSE)

John Government Higher Secondary School is a school in Viswema in the Indian state of Nagaland providing both high school and higher secondary school education. The school is the third oldest school in Nagaland.

== Overview ==
John Government Higher Secondary School was established in 5 March 1945 by John Angami and is located in Viswema, Kohima District of Nagaland. The school consists of grades from 6 to 12 and doesn't have an attached pre-primary section. The school library has over 800 books.

The Viswema Hall is currently under-construction at the site of the school.

== Alumni ==
- Vizol Koso
- Zale Neikha

== See also ==
- List of schools in Nagaland
