= Naga Hoho =

The Naga Hoho is a federation of Naga tribes from four Indian states, namely Arunachal Pradesh, Assam, Manipur, and Nagaland, and some parts of Myanmar. It was formed in 1994 at Wokha with the 'unity and fraternity' as its motto. It is considered as the tribe-based apex institution under the traditional system of the Nagas, intrinsic to the Naga ethos and culture.

== History ==
Naga Hoho was formed on 25 June 1994 at Wokha and adopted its constitution in 1998 during a Zunheboto session with the motto 'unity and fraternity', to invoke peace against the Naga political instability involving infighting between groups in the region.

The 25th Silver Jubilee celebration was conducted in 2023.

== Objectives ==
The objective of the Naga Hoho is to bring peace and tranquility in the region and to uphold its principle that underscores equality. The intent of the platform is to ensure oneness and unity for an early solution to the Naga political issue. Thus assuring inclusivity and stability acknowledging Naga belonging. It reiterates to avoid tribal differences and embrace love and cooperation for better unity to achieve the desired goal without distorting the basic principles of Naga people and most importantly emphasized to promote the welfare of the Nagas.
