= Mount Tempü =

Peak in Viswema, India

- Location within Manipur Location within Nagaland Location within India

Highest point
- Elevation: 2,994 m (9,823 ft)
- Listing: List of Indian states and territories by highest point 1st
- Coordinates: 25.530681°N 94.084934°E

Geography
- Location: Viswema, India
- Parent range: Barail Range

Climbing
- Easiest route: Hiking

Mount Tempü is a peak of the Barail Range rising at the mountainous border of the Indian states of Manipur and Nagaland. With a height of 2994 m above sea level, is the highest peak of Manipur and the second highest peak in the Barail Range.

== Name ==
The name Tempü originates from the Viswema dialect of the Southern Angamis. Mount Tempü is also known as Esii by the Mao Nagas from Manipur.

== Geography ==
Mount Tempü is located at an altitude of 2994m above mean sea level. The peak is located in the South western part of Viswema—the starting point of the climb. The peak is bordered by other Naga people such as Mao Nagas and Maram Nagas. Occasionally the peak is snow covered during the winter months.

== Access ==
=== Transportation ===
The Asian Highway 1 and also the NH-2 passes through its foothills. The nearest airport is Dimapur Airport at Chümoukedima about 96 kilometres (60 miles) away from Viswema while the Bir Tikendrajit International Airport is located about 120 kilometres (75 miles) south of Viswema.

=== Climbing route ===
The peak can be access from the same route to Dzükou Valley that is from the foothills of Viswema. Here one can hike or take a ride to the rest house above Teyozwü Hill. From here one has to climb forty minutes to the top of the mountain (Khiyoke). Here the path on the left leads to Mount Tempü whereas on the right leads to Dzükou Valley. Mount Tempü is about two hours climb from Khiyoke.

== See also ==
- Dzüko Valley
- Kezol-tsa Forest
- Teyozwü Hill
- Viswema
