= Jakhama =

- Village and Metropolitan area
- Interactive map of Jakhama
- Location of Jakhama
- Coordinates: 25.58213°N 94.125631°E
- Country: India
- Region: Northeast India
- State: Nagaland
- District: Kohima District
- Elevation: 1,606 m (5,269 ft)

Population (2011)
  - Total: 4,695
  - Demonym: Yokha–mi
  - Dialect: Keyho
- Time zone: UTC+5:30 (IST)
- PIN: 797005
- Vehicle registration: NL-01
- Sex ratio: 1040 ♂/♀
- Website: nagaland.nic.in

Jakhama is a Southern Angami Naga village located 18 km south of Kohima, the capital of Nagaland. It hosts the St. Joseph's College, Jakhama.

== Demographics ==
Jakhama is located in Jakhama Circle of Kohima District, Nagaland with total 953 families residing. The Jakhama has a population of 5216 of which 3576 are males while 1640 are females as per Population Census 2011.

== See also ==
- Viswema
- List of villages in Nagaland
- Southern Angami
- Angami Naga
- Chakhesang Naga
