= Viseyie Koso =

Indian Sepak Takraw player

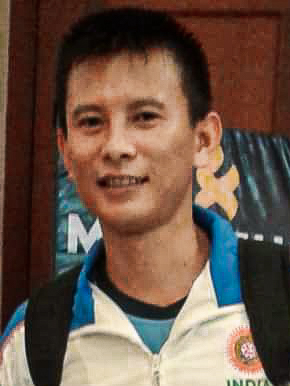
- Koso in 2013

Personal information
- Born: 25 March 1984 (age 42) Viswema, Nagaland, India

Sport
- Sport: Sepak Takraw
Medal record
Representing India
Men's sepak takraw
King's Cup Sepaktakraw World Championship
Bronze medal – third place	2015 Bangkok	team regu

Viseyie Koso (born 25 March 1984) is an Indian professional Sepak Takraw player from Nagaland. In 2010, Koso became the first Naga sportsman to represent India at the 2010 Asian Games held in Guangzhou, Guangdong, China. He also participated in the 2014 Asian Games held at Incheon in the Seoul National Capital Area, South Korea.

== Biography ==
=== Early life ===
Viseyie Koso was born on 25 March 1984, in Viswema, Nagaland. Koso did his graduation from St. Joseph's College, Jakhama.

=== Career ===
Viseyie Koso participated in the 2010 Asian Games in Guangzhou that was held from 16 to 20 November at the Haizhu Sports Center becoming the first Naga sportsman to represent India at an Asian Games.

At the 17th Asian Games in 2014 in Korea, Koso and Keneileno Nakhro along with Nagaland Sepaktakraw coach, Holshe Khrie-o represented the Indian Sepaktakraw team.

Koso also participated in the 30th Kings Cup, Sepaktakraw World Championship in Bangkok, held from 4 to 10 May. The Indian Men team won Bronze medal in Regu event.
