= Swe–ba =

- Ward under Viswema
- Location in Nagaland, India
- Coordinates: 25.561454°N 94.1449788°E
- Country: India
- State: Nagaland
- District: Kohima

Population
  - Total: 388

Languages
  - Dialect: Keyho
- Time zone: UTC+5:30 (IST)
- Vehicle registration: NL
- Website: nagaland.gov.in

Swe–ba is ward under Viswema, Nagaland located along the Asian Highway 1 and also the NH2.

The John Government Higher Secondary School and Community Health Center, Viswema are located under this ward.

== Demographics ==
Swe–ba is located in Jakhama sub-division of Kohima district, Nagaland with a total of 90 residents. It has a population of 388 as per Population Census 2011.
