= Naga folklore =

Naga folklore describes a collection of local stories, celebrations and customs of the Nagas that occupy Northeastern region of India and Northwestern region of Myanmar. The Nagas are made up of distinct cultures including Angami, Ao, Lotha, Sümi and many others. Each group has its own unique folkloric tradition.

== Folktales ==
=== Jina and Etiben ===
Jina and Etiben is an Ao Naga folktale about two lovers from Mopungchuket who were tragically separated due to the differences in their social status.

=== Sopfünuo ===
Sopfünuo is an Angami Naga folktale about a woman and her child whose lives were tragically cut short on their way back to their native village in Rüsoma.
