= Viswema =

Village and Metropolitan area in Nagaland

- Village and Metropolitan area
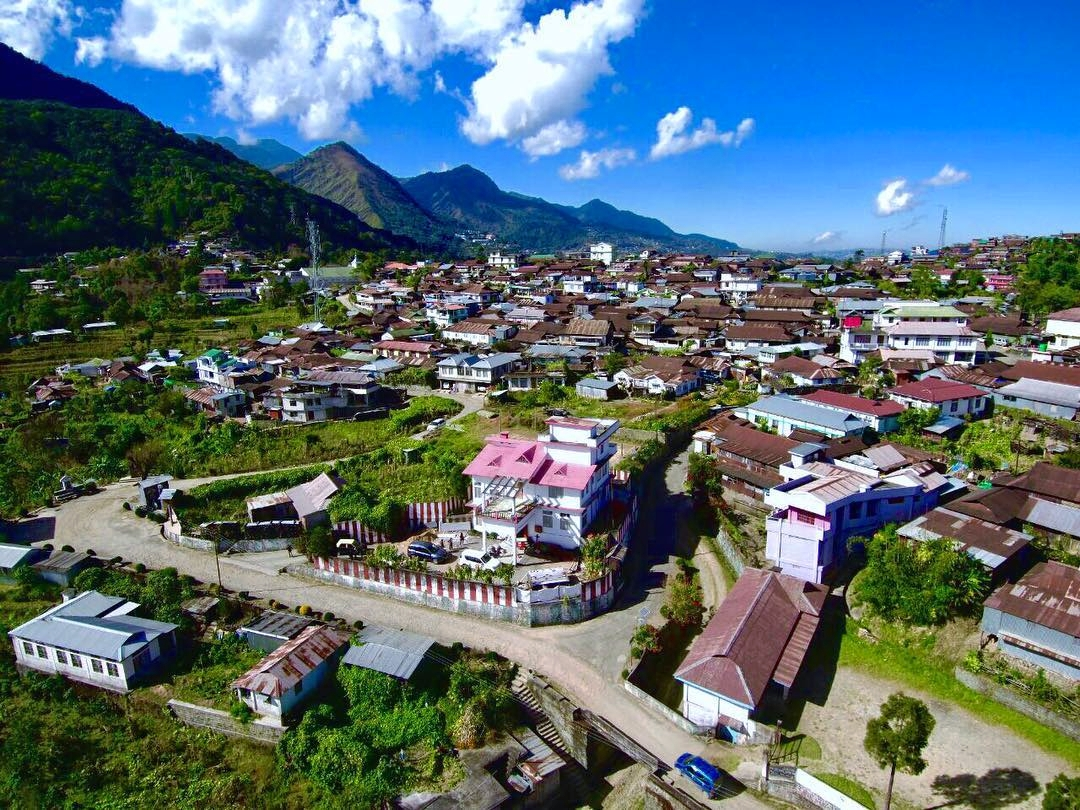
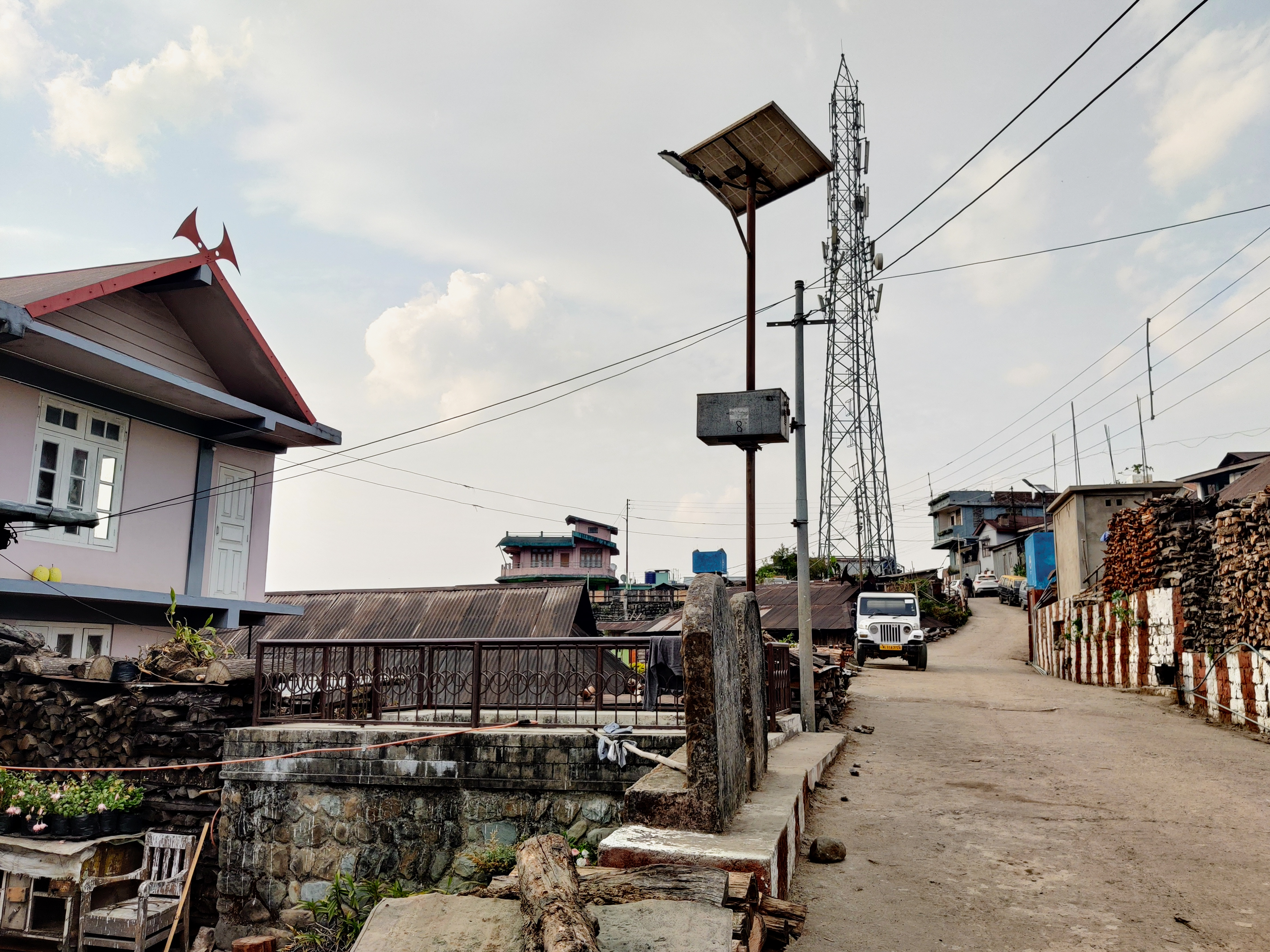
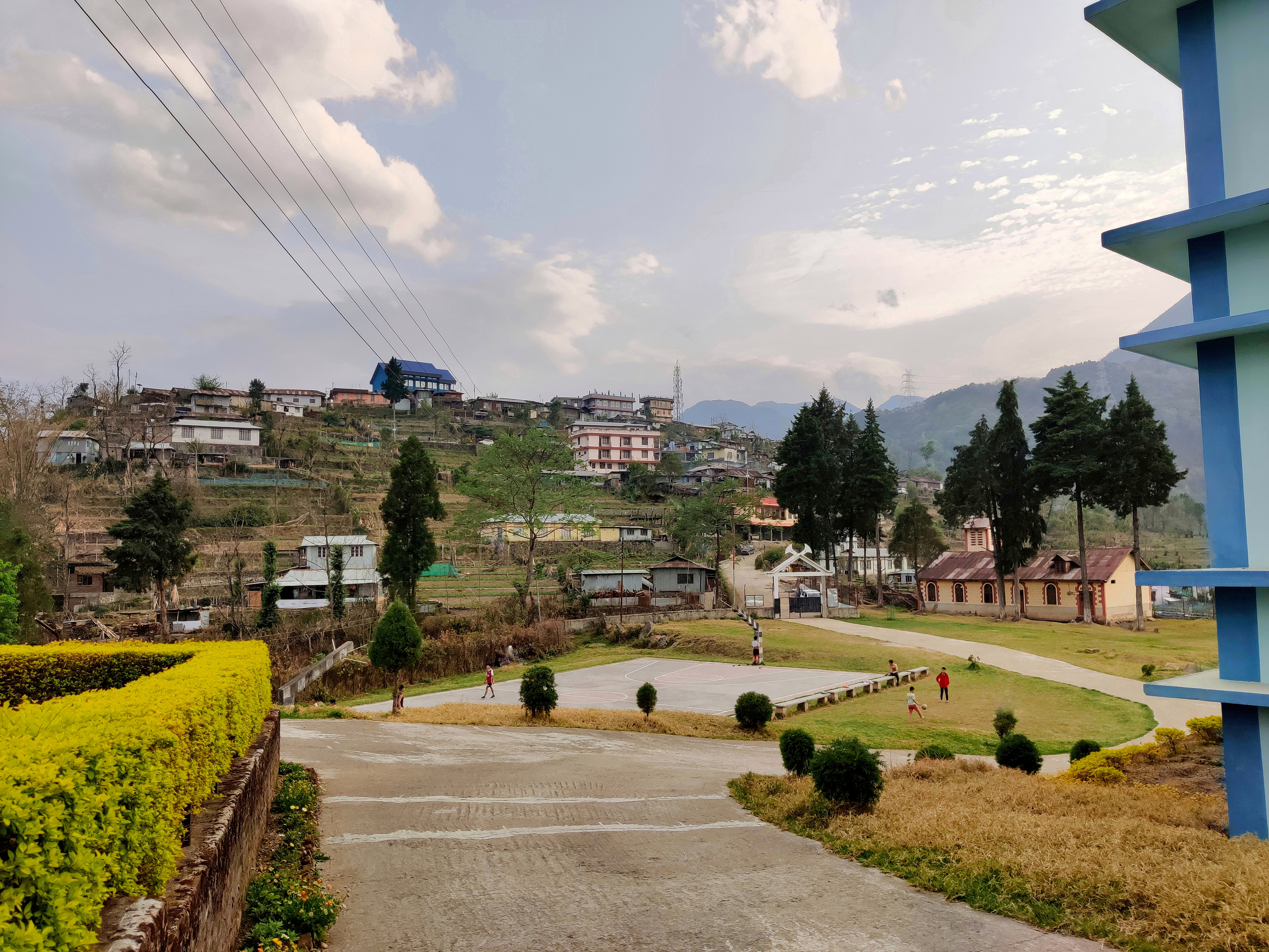
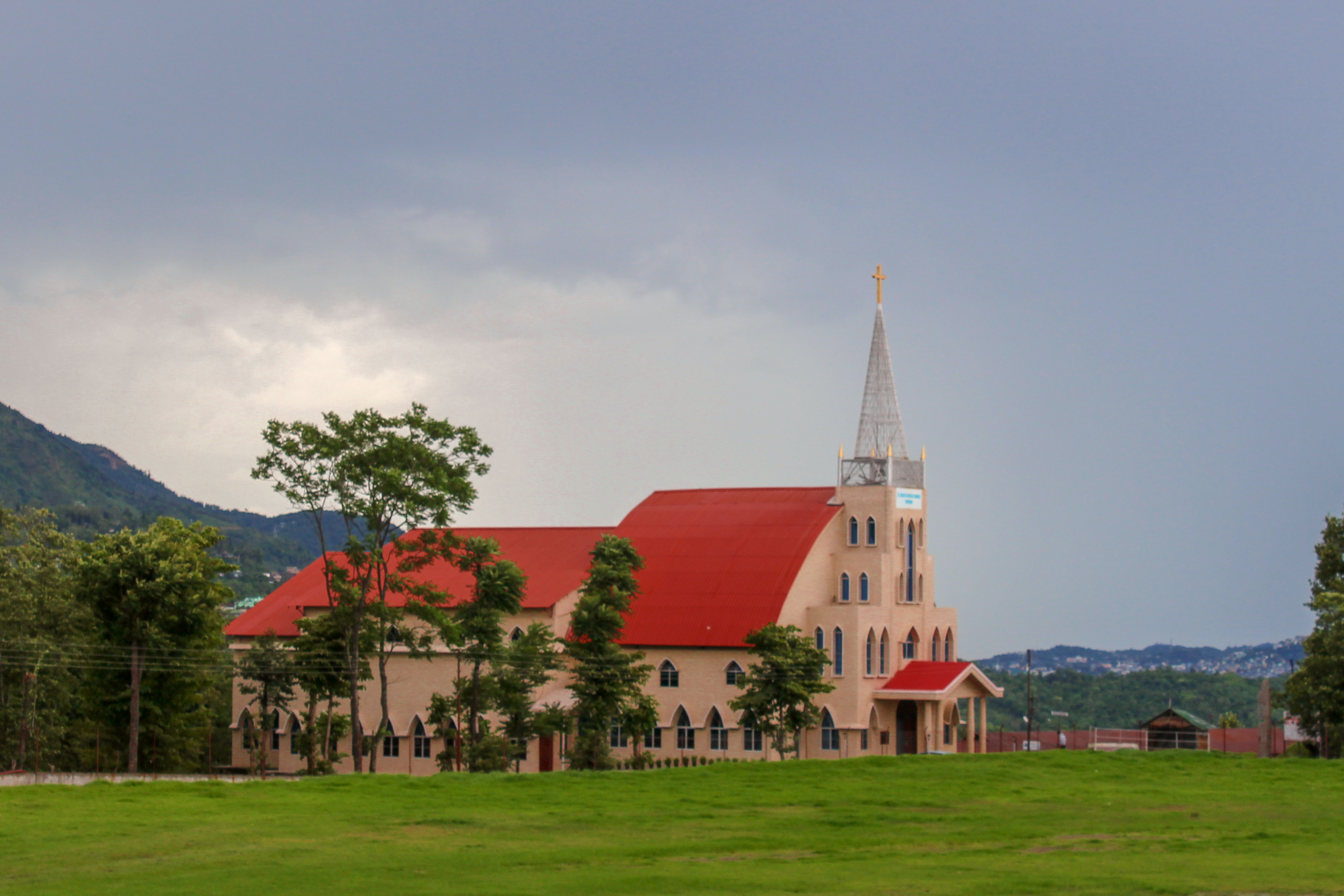
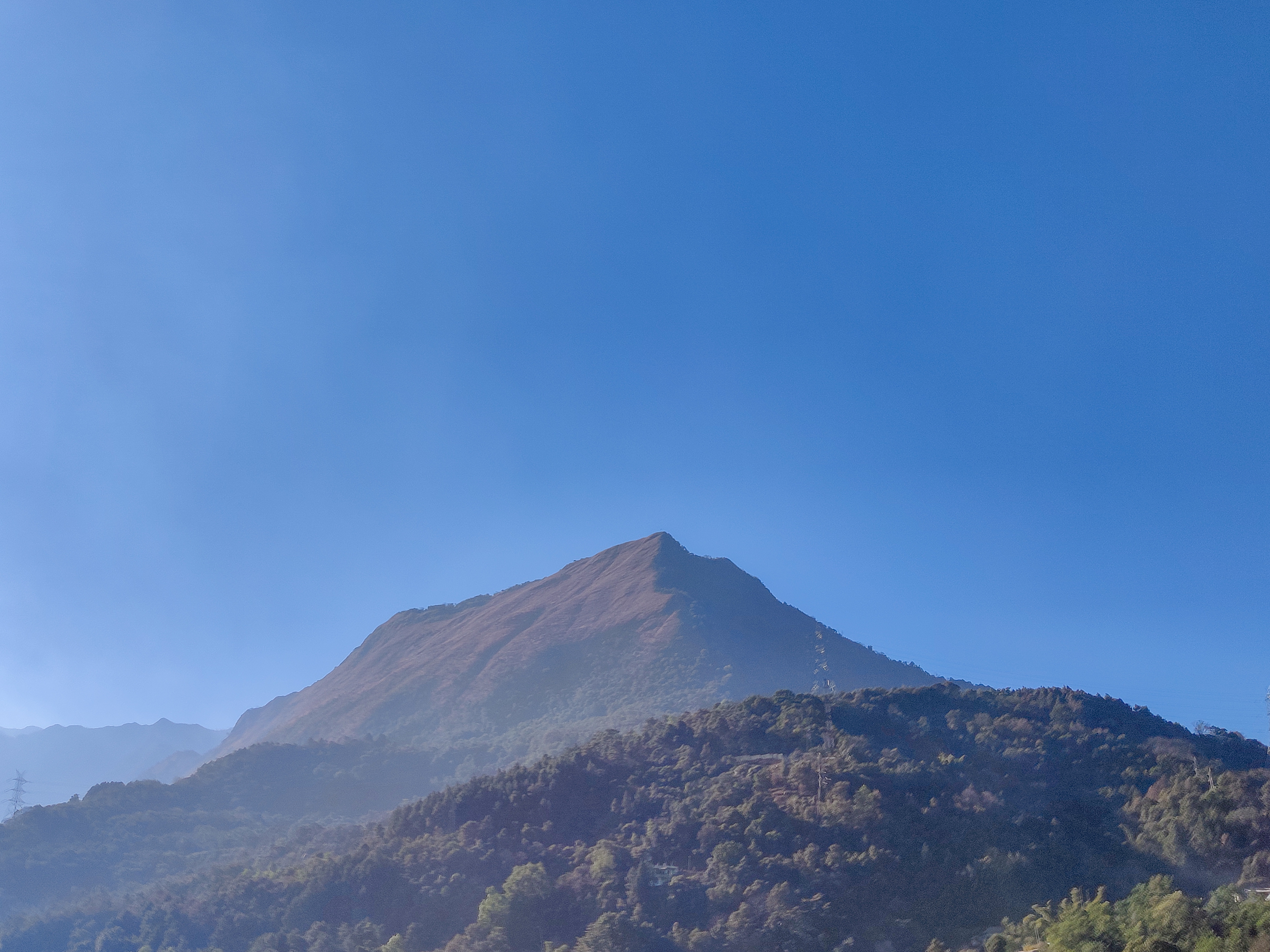
- Partial aerial view of Viswema with Barail Range Pavo–mi view Kirhazou-mi area Viswema Catholic Church Teyozwü Hill

- Location of Viswema Viswema (India) Viswema (Asia) Viswema (Earth)
- Coordinates: 25.5607°N 94.1463°E
- Country: India
- Region: Northeast India
- State: Nagaland
- District: Kohima District
- Wards: 2

Government
  - Type: Village Council
  - Body: Viswema Village Council
- Elevation: 1,631 m (5,351 ft)

Population (2011)
  - Total: 7,417
  - Demonym: Viswe–mi viswe–miko so tteyo phi–mi
  - Dialect: Keyho
- Time zone: UTC+5:30 (IST)
- PIN: 797005
- Vehicle registration: NL-01
- Sex ratio: 1074 females per 1000 males ♂/♀
- Climate: Temperate (Köppen)
- Website: viswema.com

Viswema (/ˈviswɛmə/) is a Southern Angami Naga village in the Kohima District of the Indian state of Nagaland. With a resident population of 7417, it is the second biggest village in the state and is part of the contiguous built-up of the Kohima Metropolitan Area that extends into the neighboring areas of Jakhama, Kigwema and Khuzama in the Southern Angami region, forming the second largest urban agglomerations in Nagaland. Its vast territory also lies across the inter-state boundary in Manipur where notable features including Mount Tempü (Iso) at 9822 feet (2994m) also the highest peak in Manipur, the thick forest of Kezol-tsa and a major portion of the Dzüko Valley is located.

Located 22 km south of Kohima, the capital of Nagaland, it is considered to be one of the oldest Tenyimi village with most Chakhesang villages and also many other Angami villages pointing their origin towards Viswema.

== Etymology ==
Traditionally, it is believed that Viswema, and its three neighbouring villages–Jakhama, Kidima, Kezoma–are descendants from the ancestor Keyho. The four villages were formed by his sons, Viswe (Viswema), Vikien (Jakhama), Thoran (Kidima) and Levi (Kezoma) respectively. Viswema is loosely translated as 'a place of people with virtue and integrity.'

The village is also known as Ve-sr-wü–ra by the Chokri Chakhesangs and Shüna–mai by the Ememei Maos.

== History ==
=== Early period ===
The history of Viswema, according to oral history begins with the founding of Kipizwü, some two km west of the village by Viswe. Viswe was a descendant of Keyho, who migrated from East Asia crossing present-day Myanmar, Manipur and finally settling in Viswema.

The ancestors lived there for several generations till the invasion of the Burmese-Karens, who were known to Viswe–miko as Kherenümi. The defeat inflicted on the Burmese invaders gave a sense of confidence and Viswe–mi became more assertive and grew in great numbers. They began to move out in search of suitable environment for permanent settlement. They therefore came down to the present site of the village.

In the past Viswema was known for making fine pottery ware. For any function and rituals earthen pots were purchased from Viswema by neighboring communities.

=== Pre-Modern era ===
Invasion of the Manipuri armies

"It was said that the Manipuris could not subdue Viswema given its large size. The armies could only defeat the village on its third attempt.

Before the invasion began a Manipuri messenger was sent to Viswema with something tied in a piece of cloth. When the parcel reached Viswema and the cloth was unwrapped, they found out it was ash. So the entire village intellectuals gathered around to figure out what it meant until someone stood up and said “it means they will burn down our village to ashes.” And so the Viswemis agreed to this and sent the messenger back to Manipur with grinded Naga King Chilly tied in the same piece of cloth meaning “Attack us if you want to know what pain feels like.”

— Oral history (Note: Oral History.)

The Manipuris invaded Viswema twice, but could not succeed in subduing it. However, after the end of the Anglo-Naga War in 1879 the British occupied Kohima and set up a military post and built strong barricade around the station with armed police. But the garrison was besieged by Naga warriors. Meantime the British sought help from the Manipuri Raja. The Manipuri Raja Chandrakirti Singh led around a thousand of his army and rushed to Kohima and after a brief engagement with the Naga warriors lifted the sieged and saved the British.

The Manipuri Army went on a rampage and captured a Kohima boy and buried him alive in the heart of the town. They covered the grave with a huge stone on which the foot print of the Manipuri Raja was engraved. This stone was removed by the Naga Youth Movement leaders in 1956.

At the time of the Manipuri army withdrawal from Kohima, the Viswe–miko left their village and hid their food grains in trenches and waited for their return from Kohima. When the Manipuris arrived and finding none set the village ablaze and proceeded homewards. Viswema warriors then attacked them from the rear, throwing them in confusion and disorder. Many were killed and their arms looted, while the rest fled to their country.

=== Modern era ===
- World War II

When the Japanese and INA soldiers entered Naga Hills in early April 1944, many of them stayed at the outskirt of the village. They dug trenches and built strong bunkers everywhere in the vicinity of the village. Since the Allies operation against Japanese occupation of Kohima, Viswema was continuously hit by explosive missiles which were fired by cannons from Kohima and later on from Kigwema as launching pads. Many people were killed and injured. On 10 June 1944, a message from the Allies sources was conveyed to the village elders telling them to evacuate their village. The village was evacuated the next day. Bombings on 14 June continued till the village which had more than 600 houses at that time was completely razed to the ground. The same evening the Japanese forces at Viswema retreated to the route by which they had entered Naga Hills two months back. Viswema was then taken over by the Allies.

- 1965 Naga National Council General Convention

On 21 May 1965, NNC had its General Convention after a gap of nine years. Imkongmeren, Vice President of the Naga National Council presided. He observed,“The art of peace making is much more difficult than the science of war.” The two resolutions passed at the session were: reaffirmation of A. Z. Phizo as their leader and earnest wish that the government and people of India recognise the right of the Nagas to self-determination so that the cherished hope and the deep search for permanent peace to live together as good friends, good neighbours, may be fruitful and fulfilled. At the session, Lungshim Shaiza announced the dissolution of the Democratic Party.

- Territorial dispute

In 1985, the first recorded dispute over the Dzüko Valley occurred when a group comprising nine officials of the Government of Manipur and ten Mao Naga youths visited the valley. While returning through Viswema, the group were detained by local authorities, compelled to submit a written apology for trespassing and were then handed over to the Nagaland Police. In April 2000, construction of a rest house in the Kezol-tsa Forest was initiated under the authority of Daniel Kikhi, then Chairperson of the Viswema Village Council, to demarcate the boundary of Viswema. The construction was opposed by volunteers from Song Song village. On 23 November 2000, youths from Song Song dismantled the rest house, leading to escalated tensions between the two sides. The Tenyimi Central Union (TCU), now known as the Tenyimi People's Organisation, intervened and temporarily defused the situation. The TCU subsequently directed the Mao Council to instruct Song Song village to rebuild the dismantled structure, stating that "the destroyed rest house should be re-constructed to its original shape by Songsong village within 20 (twenty) days with effect from 15th February 2001". The rest house was reconstructed within the stipulated period.

- 2010 Mao Gate Incident

On 5 May 2010, Thuingaleng Muivah the present general secretary of the NSCN-IM arrived at Viswema on his way to his home village of Somdal in the Ukhrul District of Manipur which was strongly opposed by the Manipur government. Muivah stayed overnight at Viswema which was nearby on the inter-state border. The next day thousands gathered at Mao Gate to protest against the Manipur State Government's decision to prevent the entry of Muivah into Manipur but violence broke out between the civilians and security forces stationed at the Manipur–Nagaland border. On that day, two students were killed in indiscriminate firing by security forces of Manipur. Scores were injured.

- 2010 Indian Army helicopter crash

On 18 August 2010, an Aérospatiale SA 315B Lama crashed after takeoff at the slopes of Teyozwü Hill. All three army personnel on board were killed immediately on impact.

== Clans ==
The Viswe–mi people are divided into four clans. These clans are further divided into sub-clans known as ‘Sara-miko’ which are the ‘last names/family names’ that the people are identified with. They are, namely:

=== Kirhazou-mi ===
The family names of the Kkrah-zwü-mi (also Kirhazou-mi) clan are:

| Thenü (clan) | Sara-miko (surname) | Lo-kryo (middle name) |
|---|---|---|
| Kirha | Kikhi | Mese; Lile; Zona; Thucho; Puswe |
| Kirha | Rhetso | Zale; Krachü; Rase |
| Kirha | Thapo | |
| Kirha | Vitsu | Zale; Merwu; Füzwe; Yorwu; Püzwe; Pocho |

=== Pavo-mi ===
The Pavo-mi clan is divided into two sub-clans—Tepa and Tevo which forms the Pavo–mi (tePA and teVO). The family names are:

| Thenü (clan) | Sara–miko (surname) |
|---|---|
| Tevo | Kiso |
| Tevo | Phiyie |
| Tevo | Toso |
| Tevo | Valeo |
| Tevo | Zaphü |
| Tepa | Chaya |
| Tepa | Khanyo |
| Tepa | Puyo |

=== Rachü-mi ===
The family names of the Rachü-mi clan are:

| Thenü (clan) | Sara-miko (surname) |
|---|---|
| Rachü | Kin |
| Rachü | Kweho |
| Rachü | Lcho |
| Rachü | Neikha |
| Rachü | Noswe |
| Rachü | Pusa |
| Rachü | Rhütso |
| Rachü | Sothu |
| Rachü | Theyo |

=== Yeri-mi ===
Commonly romanized as Zheri-mi. The family names of the Yeri-mi clan are:

| Thenü (clan) | Sara-miko (surname) | Lo-kryo (middle name) |
|---|---|---|
| Yeri | Dzüne | |
| Yeri | Hibo | Ngoti; Sakhrü (Sakhrie); Vohi |
| Yeri | Kechü | |
| Yeri | Kenna-o | Chel; Nukwu; Posole; Yoho |
| Yeri | Koso | Hoyo; Rakhwe-l; Vitso-n |
| Yeri | Mekro | |
| Yeri | Nale-o | Nale–eso; Nale–ekhryo |
| Yeri | Pucho | |
| Yeri | Tsükrü | |

== Geography ==
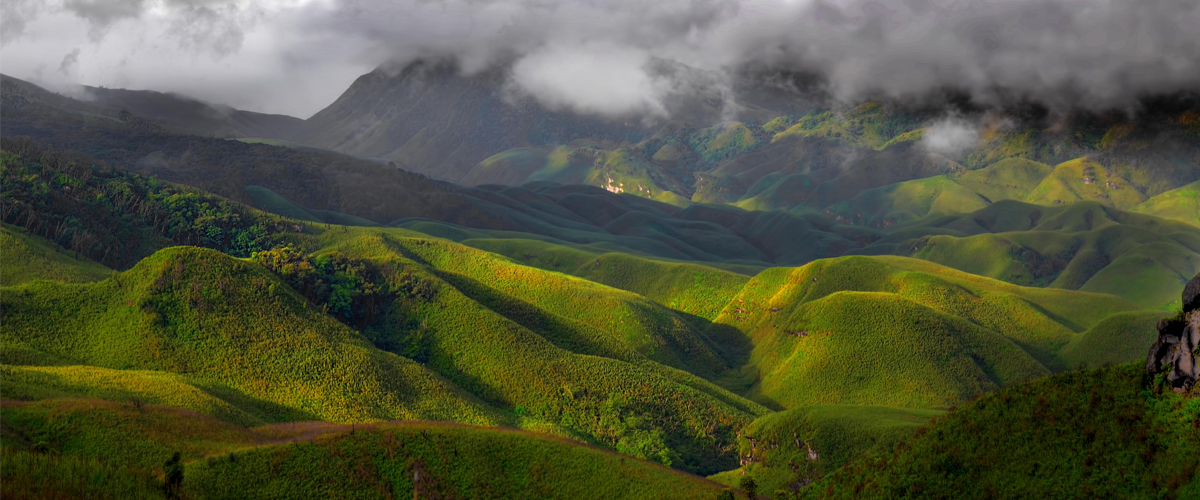
Dzüko Valley situated in the western part of Viswema

Viswema is situated at 1,631 m (5,351 ft) above sea level on the eastern part of the Barail mountain range. It is bounded on the west by Zeliangrong villages, on the north by Jakhama, on the east by Kidima, on the south-east by Pudunamei (Manipur) and on the south by Khuzama.

=== Topography ===
The Jakhama boundary on the north is marked by a river known as Kerho–l and on the south, the Khuzama boundary is marked by another river known as Chokhwi–l or Kezo–l. Both the river flows in parallel direction to meet at the Dzü-ü river which later flows into the biggest river in Nagaland—the Doyang in Wokha District.

Mount Tempü, the highest peak in Viswema (also the highest peak in the present day state of Manipur) with an altitude of 2,994 m (9,823 ft) above sea level, the highest elevation of the surrounding area is located to the south western part of Viswema. Its summit can be reached easily by the Khiyo–ke route.

On the western side is the Dzüko Valley which includes a range of hillocks, the valley is drained by the Dzüko River which flows in a westerly direction forming the present day inter-state boundary between Nagaland and Manipur. On its southern side, the Dzüko Valley is flanked by the thick wooded Kezol-tsa Forest which has diverse species of flora and fauna.

=== Climate ===
Viswema has warm summers and cool dry winters. Snow falls occasionally on higher altitudes.

Viswema

Climate chart (precipitation, max. and min. temperature)
| J | F | M | A | M | J | J | A | S | O | N | D |
| 43 20 6 | 50 23 8 | 153 26 12 | 341 27 14 | 521 27 16 | 810 27 18 | 1118 27 19 | 893 27 19 | 642 27 18 | 461 26 14 | 67 24 10 | 36 21 8 |
- █ Average max. and min. temperatures in °C
- █ Precipitation totals in mm
- Source: World Weather Online
Imperial conversion
| J | F | M | A | M | J | J | A | S | O | N | D |
| 1.7 68 43 | 2 73 46 | 6 79 54 | 13 81 57 | 21 81 61 | 32 81 64 | 44 81 66 | 35 81 66 | 25 81 64 | 18 79 57 | 2.6 75 50 | 1.4 70 46 |
- █ Average max. and min. temperatures in °F
- █ Precipitation totals in inches

== Wards ==
Viswema comprises two wards:

- Swe–ba ward
- Tepul ward

== Demographics ==
Historical population
| Year | Pop. | ±% |
|---|---|---|
| 2001 | 5,833 | — |
| 2011 | 7,417 | +27.2% |
Viswema Decennial Growth

Viswema is located in Jakhama Sub-Division of Kohima District, Nagaland with total 1369 families residing. It has a population of 7417 of which 3576 are males while 3841 are females as per Population Census 2011.

In Viswema the Average Sex Ratio is 1074 which is higher than Nagaland state average of 931. Child Sex Ratio for the Viswema as per census is 1076, higher than Nagaland average of 943.

=== Religion ===
Religion in Viswema (2011)
1. Christianity (98.1%)
2. Pfütsana (1.00%)
3. Others (0.01%)

Christianity is the dominant religion in Viswema, practised by almost 99% of its population with very few individuals from Kirhazou-mi and Pavo-mi Clans still practicing Pfütsana, the indigenous folk religion. Baptist, Christian Revival and Roman Catholic makes up the Christian population.

== Economy ==
In Viswema, most people were engaged in the civil service which serves as the main source of its economy. In 2016, 62% of the people were engaged in civil service, 4% were involved in private sector and 34% of the people were engaged in agriculture. A large number of Government and Private employees commute to and fro to their workplaces in Kohima daily.

== Culture and attractions ==
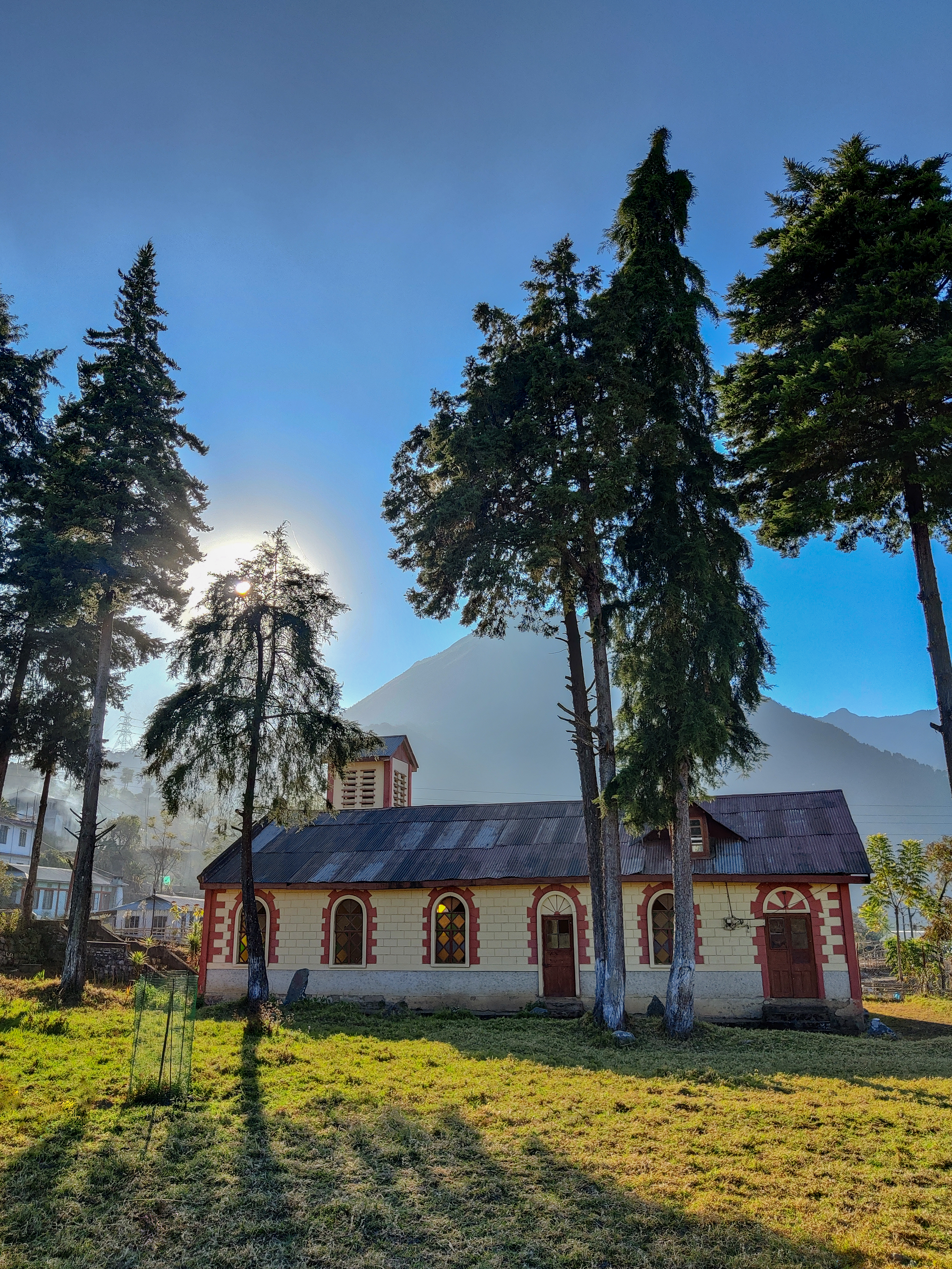
Old Viswema Catholic Church

=== Festivals ===
Apart from the major religious festivals like Christmas, Easter, etc. the village also celebrates several local festivals.

- Te–l Khukhu

Te–l Khukhu is a festival that falls on the 13th of Chünyi (July). It is a time of giving and sharing of food with each other. This is the only festival dedicated for girls. Come July and the young damsels are abuzz with preparations for the Te–l Khukhu festival. They start collecting wild flowers in advance to decorate the particular Chokrwu (eaves at the entrance of a house) they decide on. The most common flowers are Khwüso Pü (Ginger lily, Hedychium aurantiacum wall), Phakü Pü (Rock butterfly lily, Hedychium ellepticum Buch), Terü su and Tsakoshe Pitha Nü (Tender Maize). Gone were the days when different animistic rituals were performed but with the advent of Christianity the rituals were no longer performed. Today it is celebrated as a time of get-togetherness and sharing the little you have with your dear and near ones.

=== Places of interest ===
- Dzukou Valley

The main entry to Dzukou Valley is from Viswema where one can travel to the rest house above Teyozwü by a Tata Sumo taxi. From here one has to climb forty minutes to the top of the mountain. This is where Dzukou starts but the main valley is still another two hours walk away.

- Mount Tempü

This is the highest peak in Viswema situated at an altitude of 2994m above sea level. The best time to visit this peak is during the snow covered winter months.

- Teyozwü

This is a hill located between Viswema and the Dzüko valley.

- Hope Garden

This is a garden located above Viswema on the way to Dzüko valley. It is also a part family burial ground of a Yeri–mi clan.

- Latakhrü Park

Latakhrü Park is located at Krayo which provides a resting shed to travelers and also farmers on the route.

=== Cuisines ===
- Zawo

Zawo or commonly known as Galho among the Angamis is also a popular dish in Viswema. It is a mix dish made of rice, vegetables and various meats.

- Mesü

Mesü is pork or beef cooked with its blood. It is a common cuisine among the Tenyimis but the Mesü of Viswema is considered to be the best.

=== Film ===
Some portions of the 2005 film Were I the Moon? The Legend of Sopfünuo was filmed in Viswema.

== Churches ==
Viswema has three churches: Baptists, Roman Catholic and Christian Revival.

The Viswema Baptist Church will celebrate 100 years of Christianity in 2028.

== Education ==
Viswema has a higher literacy rate compared to Nagaland. In 2011, the literacy rate of Viswema was 80.69% compared to 79.55% of Nagaland. In Viswema Male literacy stands at 86.91% while female literacy rate was 74.89%.

Educational Institutions in Viswema:

- John Government Higher Secondary School
- St. Joseph's Higher Secondary School
- Viswema Baptist School

The St. Joseph's College, Jakhama is located about two km from Viswema.

== Government and politics ==
=== Government ===
Viswema is headed by the chairman of the Viswema Village Council. The council does not only represent the citizens of Viswema but every citizens of Viswe–mi residing in and outside Viswema. The council is responsible for customary practices, public safety, welfare services, etc. The chairman and council members are elected to five-year term. The term for the chairman and council members lasts five years and only has a one term limit.

=== Politics ===
Viswema falls under the Southern Angami II constituency, of the Nagaland Legislative Assembly.

In the 2023 General election the most popular party was the Bharatiya Janata Party (BJP) which received 36.97% of the vote. The next two most popular parties were the Nationalist Congress Party (NCP) (34.19%) and the Janata Dal (United) (JD(U)) (28.56%). In the general election, a total of 16,188 votes were cast, and the voter turnout was 90.90%.

== Sports ==
=== Football ===
Viswema is known for its football club Viswemi FC.

=== Traditional sports ===
- Kene

Kene, the folk wrestling style and traditional sport of the Nagas is also a popular local sport in Viswema. Viswema biennially sends its wrestling title-holder to participate in the Naga Wrestling Championship.

- Pcheda

Pcheda is a traditional game that requires players to throw thin bamboo sticks from a set distance. An open competition is held annually in the month of January.

== Transportation ==
=== Airports ===
The nearest airport is Dimapur Airport located at Chümoukedima–Dimapur about 96 kilometres (60 miles) from Viswema. The airport serves domestic flights to and from the country.

The Bir Tikendrajit International Airport is located about 120 kilometres (75 miles) south of Viswema.

Both the airports are linked to Viswema by the Asian Highway 1 and 2.

The Kohima Chiethu Airport is currently under construction. Once completed it will serve as the nearest airport to Viswema.

=== Roadways ===
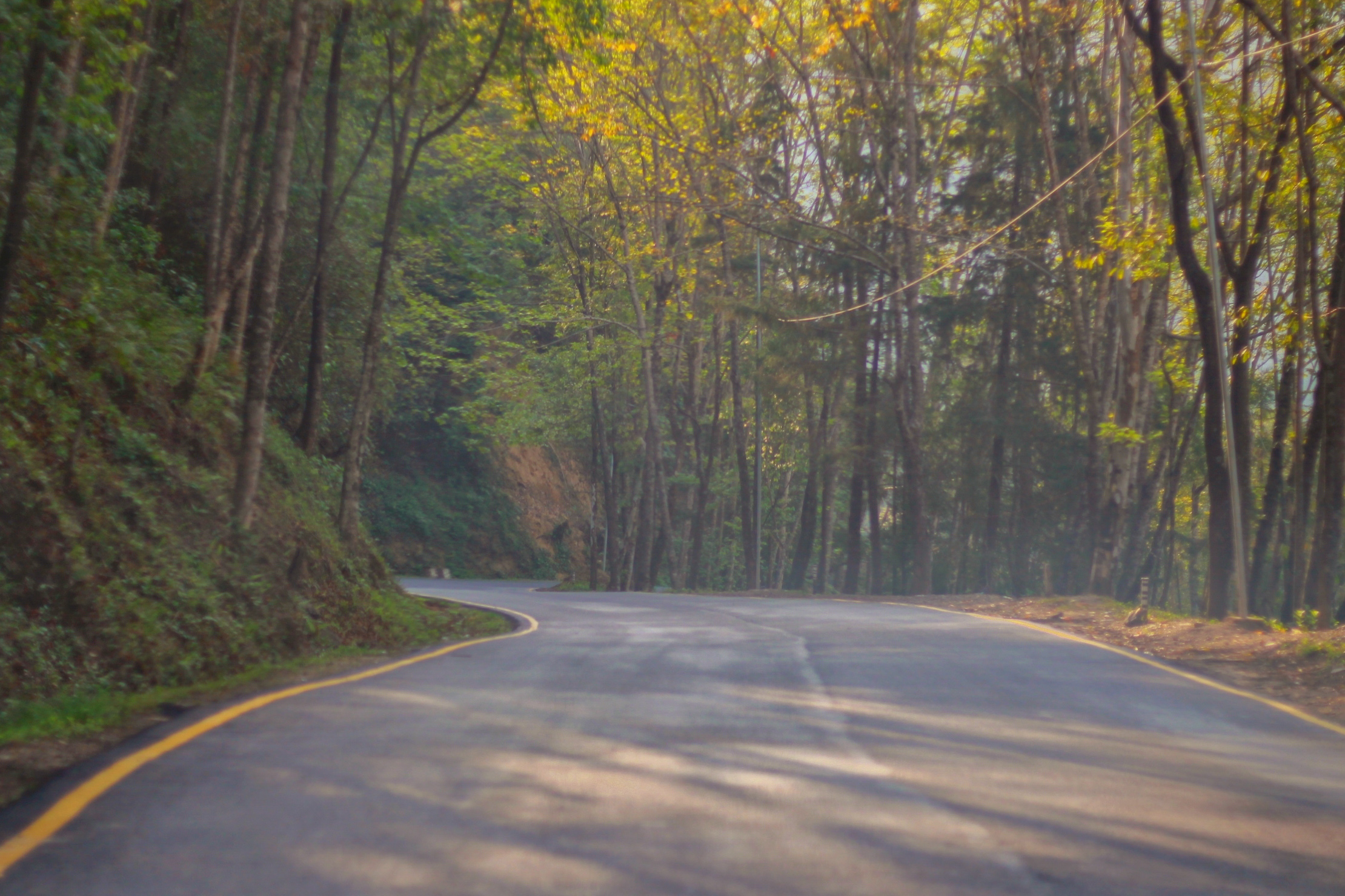
AH1 passing through Viswema

==== Highways passing through Viswema ====
- Asian Highway 1: Tokyo – Viswema – Istanbul
- Asian Highway 2: Denpasar – Viswema – Khosravi
- NH 2: Dibrugarh (Assam) – Viswema – Tuipang (Mizoram)

Viswema is well connected by road with the AH1 and AH2 and also the NH-2 and the state highway connecting it with the various parts of Kohima District and also the neighboring Phek District through Viswema. Taxis from Kohima to Viswema are also available.

=== Rail ===
The Chümoukedima Shokhüvi Railway Station and the Dimapur Railway Station serves as the nearest railway stations to Viswema. The currently under-construction Kohima Zubza Railway Station on the Dhansiri–Zubza line once completed will serve as the nearest railway station from Viswema.

== Notable personalities ==
Throughout its history, a sizeable number of people of Viswema descent have become notable in many varied fields. Among its notable personalities are prominent figures in the state such as:

=== Politics ===
- Vizol Koso, The fourth Chief Minister of Nagaland and also the first Naga pilot (Royal Indian Air Force during World War II)
- Zale Neikha, Member of Nagaland Legislative Assembly from 2018 to 2023 from the Nationalist Democratic Progressive Party
- Viswesül Pusa, Member of Nagaland Legislative Assembly from 1993 to 2013 from the Indian National Congress Party
- Tseilhoutuo Rhütso, Present Member of Nagaland Legislative Assembly from Kohima Town Assembly constituency from the National People's Party
- Vizadel Sakhrie, first Naga Medical Specialist
- Zaku Zachariah Tsükrü, student leader
- Kropol Vitsu, Present Member of Nagaland Legislative Assembly from the Bharatiya Janata Party

=== Sports ===
- Viseyie Koso, first Naga sportsman to represent India at an Asian Games (2010 Asian Games held in Guangzhou, Guangdong, China)

=== Others ===
- Hovithal Sothu, Project Director at TAFMA

== See also ==
- List of villages in Nagaland
- Viswema Hall
- Angami Naga
- Chakhesang Naga
- Index of Viswema-related articles
- Naga peoples
