= Kezol-tsa Forest =

Forest in the Indian states of Nagaland and Manipur

- Interactive map of Kezol-tsa Forest

Geography
- Location: Viswema
- Coordinates: 25.55°N 94.09°E

The Kezol-tsa Forest is a thick old-growth forest along the southern and northern edges of the Indian states of Nagaland and Manipur. The forest is located on the southern part of Dzüko Valley.

This forest has dry, warm summers and cool winter. The accumulation of several inches of snow during the winter is not uncommon and can stay on the ground for several days.

Some threats to the Kezol-tsa forest include logging, changing fire regimes and climate change.

== Flora and Fauna ==
The Kezol-tsa forests has diverse species of trees.

Animals that may be found in this forest include the deer, etc.

== Dispute ==
Kezol-tsa has been the center stage of dispute between the Mao Council of Manipur and the Southern Angami Public Organisation (SAPO) of Nagaland. Both parties have been stalking claim for Kezol-tsa forest for the last many years.

On 23 November 2000, a rest house constructed by volunteers from Viswema at Kezol-tsa was destroyed by suspected Songsong villagers and this led to tension between the Maos and the Southern Angamis. On enquiry made by Memai Council of Mao, it was found that some youths from Songsong village had destroyed the rest house and the written report was intimated by Memai Council of Mao to the then Japfüphiki Public Organization which is renamed now as Southern Angami Public Organisation. During this relevant time of tension, the then Tenyimi Central Union (TCU) intervened and directed the defaulters (Songsong village) to reconstruct the rest house of Viswema which read as ‘the destroyed rest house should be re-constructed to its original shape by Songsong village within 20 (twenty) days with effect from 15th February 2001’. The destroyed rest house was re-constructed to its original shape by the Songsong village within the stipulated time and Southern Angami ownership of Kezol-tsa is undisturbed until tensions rose again in 2015.

== See also ==
- Dzüko Valley
- Viswema
