= Dzukou Valley =

Valley on the Nagaland–Manipur border, India

- Dzükou Valley
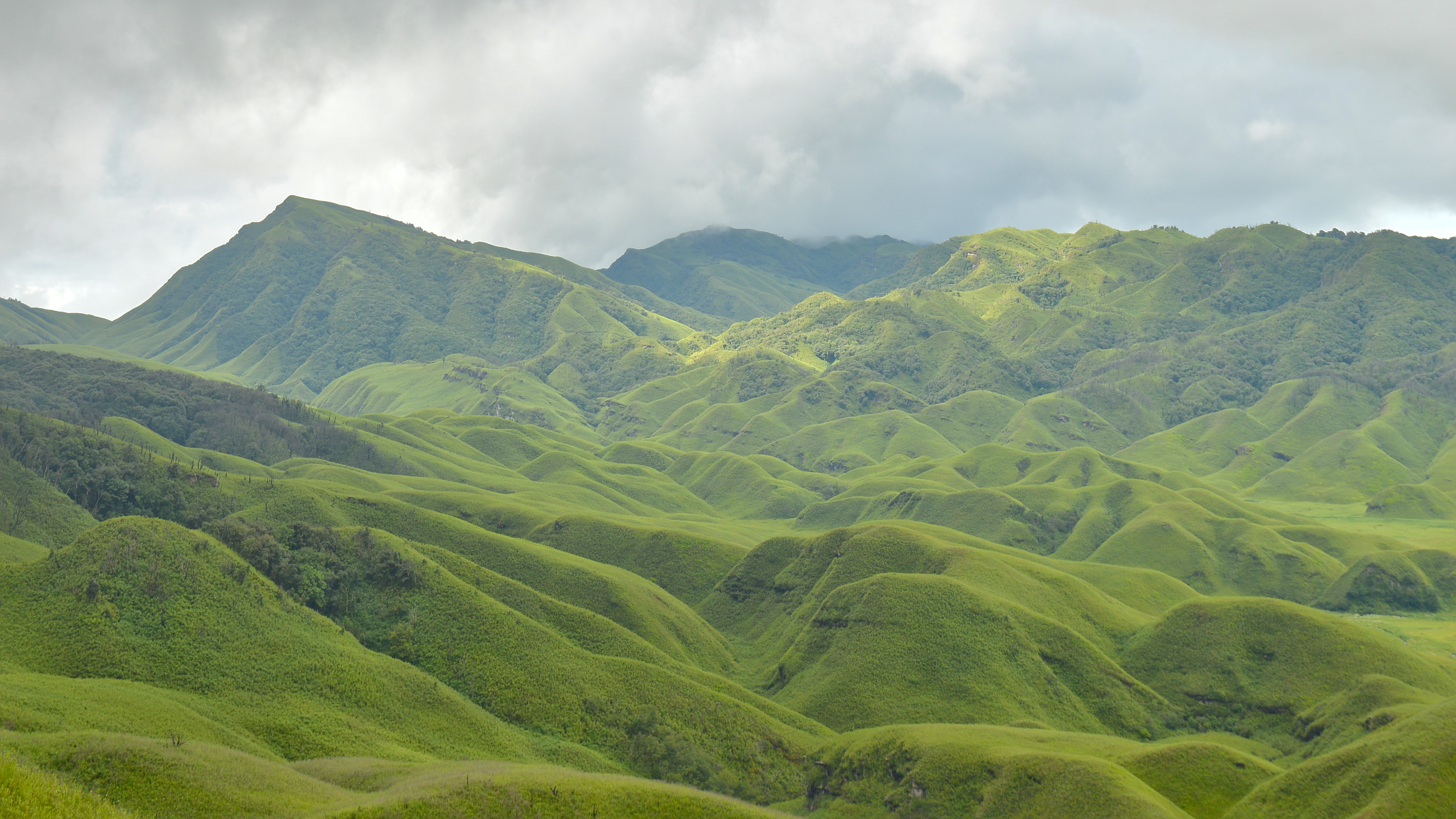
- Dzukou Valley

- Location within India
- Floor elevation: 2,438 metres (7,999 ft)
- Area: 80–90 km^{2} (31–35 sq mi)

Geography
- Location: Kohima district, Nagaland and Senapati district, Manipur, India
- Coordinates: 25.553329°N 94.067065°E
- Rivers: Dzukou Stream
- Interactive map of Dzukou Valley

The Dzukou Valley (also spelt Dzüko, Dzükou or Dzukuo) is a high-altitude valley in Northeast India, straddling the inter-state border of the states of Nagaland and Manipur. Lying behind Mount Japfü at an elevation between 2,438 and 2,452 m (7,999 and 8,045 ft) above sea level in the Kohima and Senapati districts, it is known for its rolling meadows, seasonal wildflowers and rich biodiversity, and is among the most popular trekking destinations in northeastern India.

The valley is one of the principal habitats of Blyth's tragopan (Tragopan blythii), the state bird of Nagaland, and is the type locality of the Dzukou Valley horned frog (Megophrys dzukou), described in 2020. Its iconic seasonal bloom, long known locally as the "Dzukou lily", is the same species as the Shirui lily (Lilium mackliniae). A comprehensive floristic survey was published by the Botanical Survey of India in 2016.

Administration over much of the valley is contested between Manipur and Nagaland as part of a wider inter-state boundary dispute, with the Mao Naga community of Senapati and the Southern Angami community of Kohima both asserting customary claims. The valley is also periodically threatened by wildfires, including major blazes in 2006, 2020–21 and January 2026.

== Etymology ==
The word Dzukou is drawn from a term shared by the neighbouring Angami and Mao Naga languages. Two interpretations are commonly cited. The widely circulated one glosses the name as "cold water", a compound of dzü ("water") and kou ("cold"), in reference to the icy stream that flows through the valley year round. A second, drawn from the Viswema dialect of Angami, renders the name as "dull" or "soulless", attributed to ancestors of Viswema village who tried to settle the valley but found its soil and climate unsuited to cultivation.

The umlauted form Dzükou approximates the original vowel; in practice, English-language sources use a range of spellings, including Dzukou, Dzüko, Dziiko and Dzukuo. Of these, Dzukou is the most common in contemporary news coverage and government tourism material.

== Geography ==
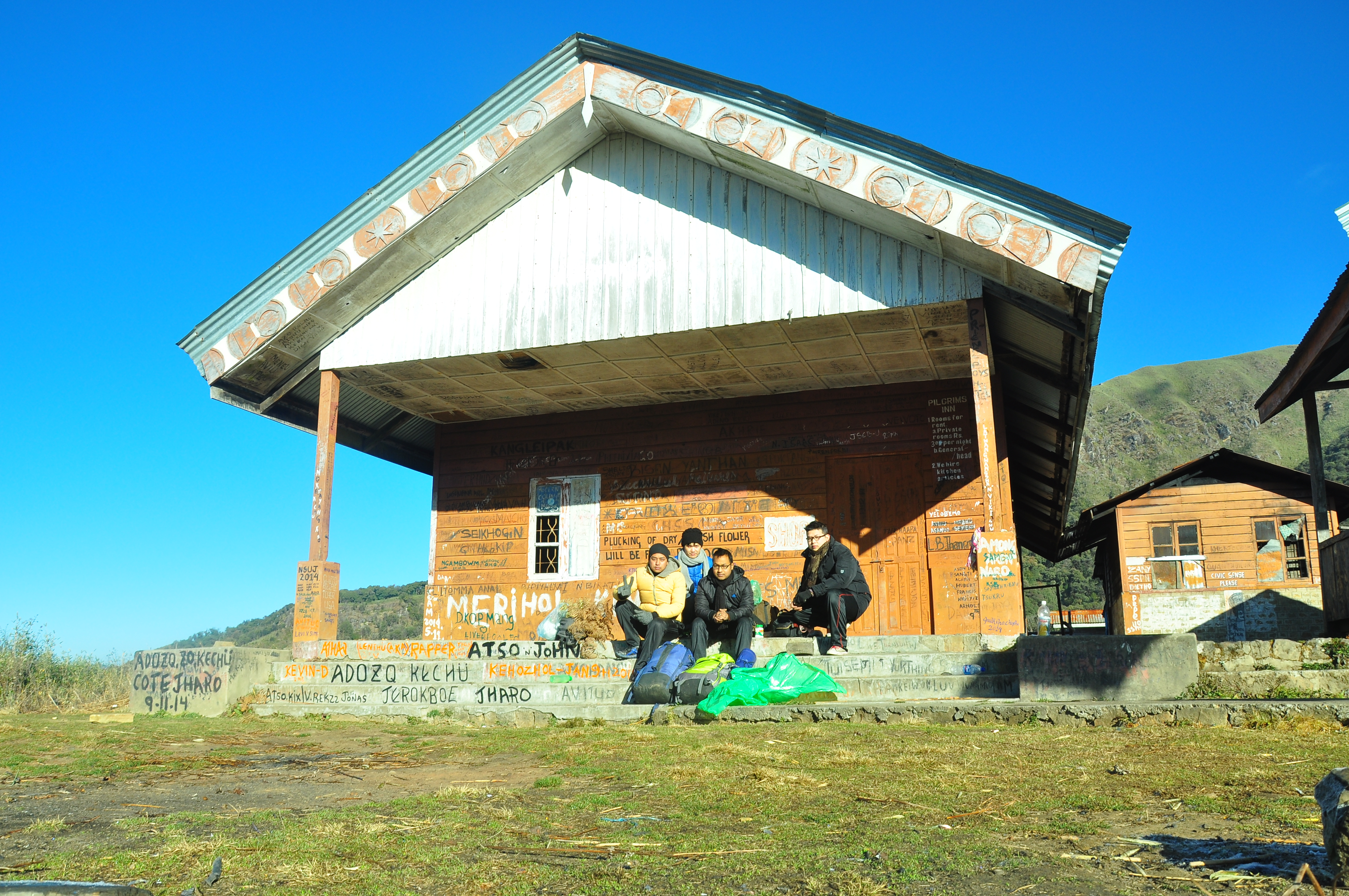
The valley guest house, operated by the Government of Nagaland

The Dzukou Valley lies immediately south of Mount Japfü (Japfü Peak), which rises to 3,048 m (10,000 ft) and is the second-highest peak in Nagaland. Elevation figures cited for the valley floor itself vary between sources, ranging from roughly 2,438 m (7,999 ft) to 2,452 m (8,045 ft) above sea level. The valley floor is a broad, undulating expanse of meadow and dwarf bamboo (Yushania rolloana, also recorded as Sinarundinaria rolloana), bounded by ridges of old-growth temperate broadleaf forest and rhododendron stands. Estimates of its area vary, with several sources placing it between 80 and 90 km^{2} (31 and 35 sq mi) (about 20,000 acres).

The valley is drained by the Dzukou Stream, which flows southward through its centre and gives the place its name in one of the proposed etymologies.

The valley is most commonly approached from the Nagaland side through the Angami villages of Viswema and Jakhama (Zakhama), both within about 25 km (16 mi) of Kohima. From the Manipur side, trails ascend from the Mao area of Senapati district, including from Mount Iso (Issi).

== Flora ==
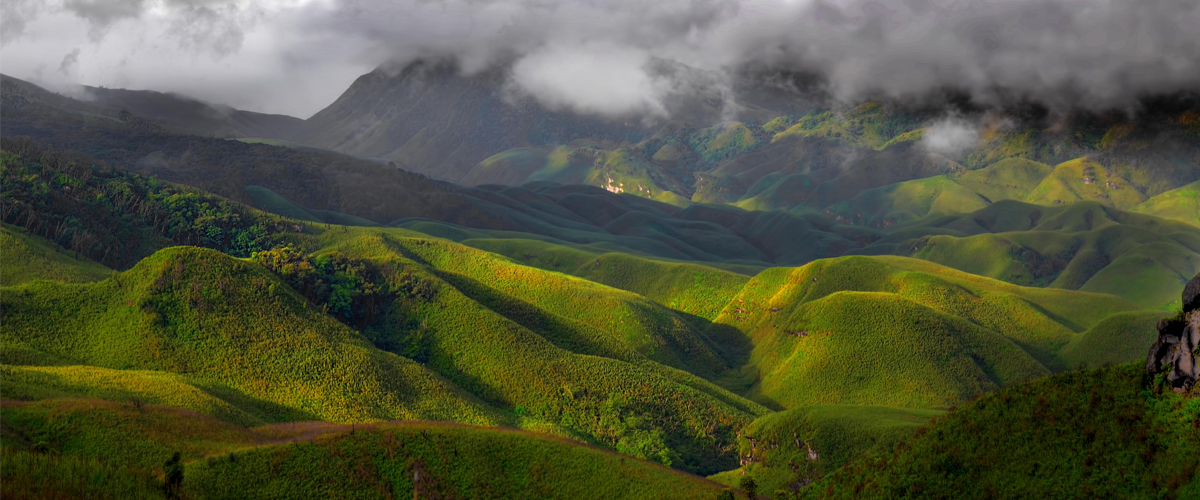
Dzukou valley in summer

The valley is best known for its succession of seasonal wildflowers, which carpet the meadow floor between May and September. A floristic study by Ashiho A. Mao and Rajib Gogoi of the Botanical Survey of India, later expanded into a book-length treatment in 2016, documented 335 vascular plant species across 223 genera and 114 families, with roughly six per cent endemic to the valley and the wider eastern Himalaya.

The most celebrated plant in the valley is a pink-flowered lily that blooms in May and June and is widely referred to as the "Dzukou lily". It was first collected in the valley in the summer of 1991 by Hijam Bikramjit of the Department of Life Sciences at Manipur University, on a trek organised under the Manipur Cultural Integration Conference. Bikramjit treated the plant as a new species, naming it Lilium chitrangadae after his mother, Chitrangada. Subsequent studies, however, found the Dzukou plant to be botanically indistinguishable from the Shirui lily (Lilium mackliniae), first described from the Shirui Hills of Manipur by Frank Kingdon-Ward in 1948 and named for his wife Jean Macklin. The name Lilium chitrangadae is therefore not accepted, and modern floristic treatments record the Dzukou population as L. mackliniae, with the pink form sometimes accompanied in the valley by an uncommon white-flowered variant.

Other characteristic flowering plants of the valley include several species of rhododendron, the monk's hood Aconitum nagarum, Euphorbia sikkimensis, and a range of Ranunculus, Gentiana and orchid species. Dwarf bamboo dominates the valley floor and forms dense thickets along its periphery, growing in places to 9 m (30 ft) in height; it tends to recolonise burnt ground rapidly and has been identified as a driver of recurrent fire cycles within the valley.

== Fauna ==
The valley and the old-growth forest around it support several rare and threatened animals. It is one of the strongholds of Blyth's tragopan (Tragopan blythii), the state bird of Nagaland, which is classed as Vulnerable on the IUCN Red List. The bird occupies forested slopes around the valley rather than its open meadow, and survives here despite hunting pressures and habitat fragmentation that have led to local declines elsewhere in the region.

Mammals reported from the valley and its surroundings include the Asian golden cat, clouded leopard, Asian black bear, hoolock gibbon, capped langur, stump-tailed macaque and serow.

The valley is the type locality of the Dzukou Valley horned frog (Megophrys dzukou), described in 2020 by Stephen Mahony, Rachunliu G. Kamei, Emma C. Teeling and S. D. Biju, alongside two other newly described species of horned frog from northeastern India. The type series was collected from leaf litter near a pool fed by a small stream within mixed broadleaf and bamboo forest at about 2,650 m (8,690 ft) in the Jakhama circle of Kohima district. M. dzukou is known only from the valley and is listed as Critically Endangered, with potential occurrence in adjacent areas of Manipur.

== Conservation ==
The Dzukou Valley does not enjoy the statutory protection of a national park or wildlife sanctuary, although the adjacent Pulie Badze Wildlife Sanctuary lies a short distance away in Kohima district. Civic and environmental bodies in both Manipur and Nagaland have campaigned for greater legal safeguards, and the Southern Angami Public Organisation (SAPO) and Southern Angami Youth Organisation (SAYO) regulate access from the Nagaland side, including the imposition of fines on visitors found to have caused fires.

=== Wildfires ===
The valley has been repeatedly affected by wildfires, which spread quickly through its dry winter grasses and dwarf bamboo and are difficult to control because of the inaccessibility of the surrounding terrain. A fire in 2006 was reported to have destroyed about 20 km (12 mi) of forest in and around the valley before being contained, and a further blaze occurred in 2018.

Between late December 2020 and early January 2021, a much larger fire burnt for roughly two weeks, destroying an estimated 200 acres (80 ha or 200 acres) of forest and grassland. National Disaster Response Force teams were deployed and the Indian Air Force conducted Bambi bucket sorties using Mi-17V5 helicopters drawing water from a lake near Dimapur.

A further wildfire broke out in the southern part of the valley on 26 January 2026 and burnt for more than a week before being substantially contained. About 30 trekkers stranded in the area were evacuated, trekking was suspended from both the Jakhama and Viswema routes, and a multi-agency response of roughly 150 personnel was mounted, including the State Disaster Response Force, the Nagaland State Disaster Management Authority, the state forest and fire services, the 13th Assam Rifles and SAYO volunteers. Two Indian Air Force helicopters carried out Bambi bucket sorties from 31 January. Officials reported that the main valley remained largely unaffected, with the fire concentrated on slopes around Mount Tempü and approaching Manipur's highest peak, Mount Iso (also spelt Esii). Dense dwarf bamboo and steep terrain were cited as the principal obstacles to ground-level firefighting.

Researchers have suggested that the recurrence of such fires is partly self-reinforcing: dwarf bamboo recolonises burnt ground rapidly and suppresses other vegetation, creating dense, fire-prone thickets that fuel later blazes. Several recent fires have been linked to visitor negligence, prompting calls for tighter regulation of trekking and camping in the valley.

Local civic and environmental organisations have also conducted clean-up drives in the valley, including a "plastic-free zone" campaign launched on World Environment Day in 2019, under which visitors carrying plastic items are required to pay a refundable security deposit at the entry point and produce the items on the way out.

== Boundary dispute ==
The valley lies within the broader Nagaland–Manipur border dispute, which traces in part to differences in how the colonial-era boundary surveys of 1872, attributed to the British administrators Butler and Gordon, have been interpreted by the two states. Both state governments assert claims over portions of the valley, and three Naga communities, namely the Mao and Maram of Manipur and the Southern Angami of Nagaland, each assert customary ownership of overlapping tracts.

The dispute has periodically flared into civil action. In 2015, the Mao and Angami communities clashed openly over Kezoltsa, with the Mao Council representing the Mao side and SAPO the Angami; the matter was eventually addressed by the Tenyimia People's Organization, the apex council of the related Naga tribes, and in 2017 the two communities agreed to maintain the status quo. In March 2022, the Southern Angami Public Organisation declared an indefinite bandh on National Highway 2 in protest against Manipur's deployment of armed personnel and construction of structures in the contested Kezoltsa (Kazing) forest area, which lies adjacent to the valley.

Tourism infrastructure is more developed on the Nagaland side, where the valley is reached by trail from Viswema or Jakhama and serviced by a guest house operated by the state government; the Manipur side remains less frequented, with most visitors approaching via the Mao area of Senapati district.

== See also ==
- Kezol-tsa Forest
- Mount Japfü
- Mount Tempü
- Pulie Badze Wildlife Sanctuary
- Shirui Hills
  - Shirui lily
- Tourism in Manipur
- Tourism in Nagaland
