= List of institutions of higher education in Nagaland =

The following is a list of institutions of higher education in the Indian state of Nagaland:

== Universities ==
- Nagaland University
- North East Christian University, Medziphema
- ICFAI University, Chümoukedima
- St. Joseph University, Chümoukedima
- The Global Open University, Chümoukedima

== Medical institutes ==
- Nagaland Institute of Medical Science and Research, Kohima
- Mon Medical College

== Colleges ==
=== Chümoukedima District ===
- C-Edge College
- Mount Mary College
- Norman Putsure College
- North East Institute of Social Sciences
- Patkai Christian College
- Tetso College

=== Dimapur District ===
- City College
- City Law College
- Cornerstone College
- Dimapur Government College
- Eastern Christian College
- Immanuel College
- Pranabananda Women's College
- Sakus Mission College
- SALT College
- St. John College, Dimapur
- S. D. Jain Girls' College
- Unity College

=== Kohima District ===
- Alder College
- Baptist College
- Kohima College
- Japfü Christian College
- Kohima Science College
- KROS College
- Model Christian College
- Modern College
- Mount Olive College
- Oriental College
- Sazolie College
- St. Joseph's College, Jakhama

=== Mokokchung District ===
- Fazl Ali College
- Mokokchung Law College
- Tuli College

=== Mon District ===
- Wangkhao Government College

=== Peren District ===
- Peren Government College
- St. Xavier College, Jalukie

=== Phek District ===
- Pfütsero Government College, Pfütsero
- Phek Government College, Phek

=== Tuensang District ===
- Sao Chang College

=== Wokha District ===
- Mount Tiyi Government College

=== Zünheboto District ===
- Zünheboto Government College

== Autonomous institutions ==
- National Research Centre on Mithun, Medziphema

== See also ==
- Lists of universities and colleges
