= Angami people =

Major Naga ethnic group

Angami Naga
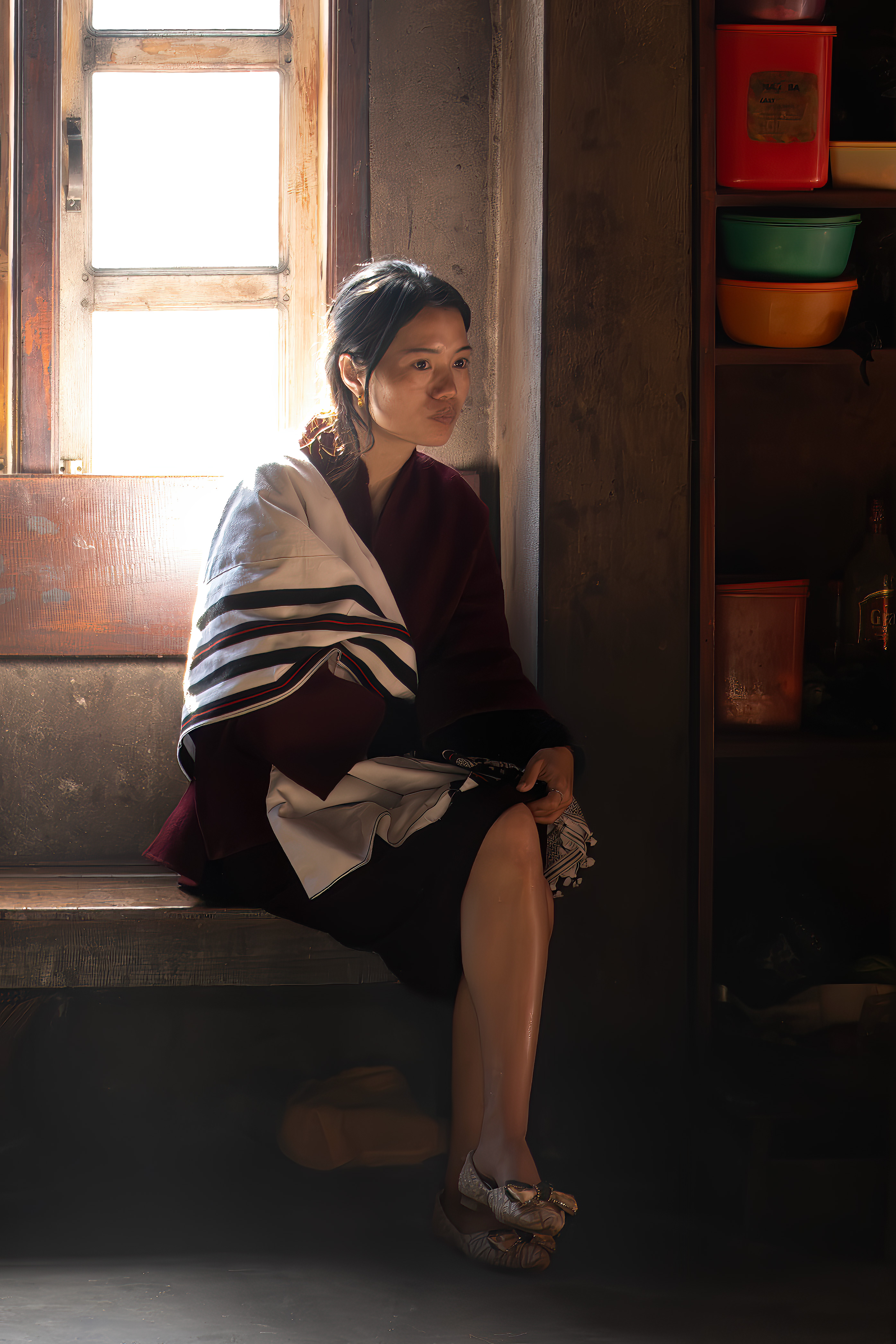
- Angami Naga woman in traditional attires

Regions with significant populations
- Nagaland (Kohima District · Chümoukedima District · Dimapur District)

Languages
- Tenyidie · Keyho · Dzu-o

Religion
- Majority: Predominantly Christianity in modern times Traditionally: Pfütsana; Minority: Pfütsana

Related ethnic groups
- Tenyimi (Chakhesang Naga · Mao Naga · Poumai Naga · Maram Naga · Rengma Naga · Zeme Naga)

The Angamis are a major Naga ethnic group native to the Northeast Indian state of Nagaland. They predominantly inhabit the Kohima District and are also found in Chümoukedima District and Dimapur District of Nagaland. There are four regional divisions of the Angamis, namely Chakhro Angami, Northern Angami, Southern Angami and Western Angami. The now separated Chakhesangs were previously known as the Eastern Angamis.

== Etymology ==
The Angamis traditionally identify themselves through village affiliations and more broadly as part of the Tenyimi group, a collective ethnolinguistic designation shared with several related Naga ethnic groups.

The origin of the term Angami is an exonym. Scholars have suggested that the name may derive from Shüngamei or Ngami, terms reportedly used by neighbouring communities such as the Mao Nagas, Poumai Nagas, Maram Nagas and the Meiteis to refer to the Angami people. Over time, the term was adopted and anglicised in British colonial ethnographic and administrative records as Angami.

The Angami were also referred to as "Gamai" meaning thieves/robbers by the Zeliangrong Naga mainly because in the past Khonoma villagers would raid some of the Zeme villages located near the border between the Angami and Zeme territory.

== Origin ==
The origins of the Angami, like the rest of the Nagas, are preserved primarily through oral traditions. The Angamis trace their ancestry to Makhel, a historic settlement under present-day Senapati District of Manipur, which is regarded as a common point of dispersal for the Tenyimis and several other Naga ethnic groups.

Kigwema and Viswema are considered the oldest ancestral settlements of the Angami Nagas. According to Angami oral tradition, many villages later branched out from these two settlements.

== Distribution ==
The territory of the Angamis is mostly located in the present Kohima, Chümoukedima and Dimapur Districts of Nagaland with a part of its territory also lying in the Niuland District of Nagaland and Senapati District of Manipur. The territory is divided into four regions:

=== Southern Angami ===
This region also known as Japfüphiki is bounded on the south by the Mao Nagas, on the southwest by the Maram Nagas, on the west by the Zeliangrongs, on the northwest by the Western Angamis, on the north by the Northern Angamis, on the northeast by the Chokri Chakhesangs and on the southeast by the Khezha Chakhesangs.

The urban and rural centres are:

- Viswema, Jakhama, Kigwema, Khuzama, Phesama, Kidima, Mima, Mitelephe, Pfuchama, Kezoma, Kezo Basa, Kezo Town and Sakhabama (formerly Chakhabama).

=== Western Angami ===
This region is bounded by the Zeliangrongs on the west, on the southeast by the Southern Angamis, on the east by the Northern Angamis and on the northwest by the Chakhro Angamis.

The urban and rural centres are:

- Khonoma, Jotsoma, Dzüleke, Sechü Zubza, Mezoma, Sechüma, Kiruphema, Peducha, Mengujüma and Thekrejüma.

=== Northern Angami ===
This region is bounded by the Western Angamis on the west, on the south by the Southern Angamis, on the east by the Chakhesang Nagas, the northeast by the Sümi Nagas, on the north by the Rengma Nagas and on the northwest by the Western Sümis.

The urban and rural centres are:

- Kohima, Kohima Village, Chiephobozou, Chiechama, Nachama, Tuophema, Zhadima, Kijümetouma, Tsiemekhuma, Chüziema, Chedema, Meriema, Nerhema, Gariphema, Dihoma, Rüsoma, Tsiesema, Tsiesema basa, Seiyhama, Botsa and Phekerkrie.

=== Chakhro Angami ===
Mostly settled in the flatlands around the Districts of Chümoukedima, Dimapur and Niuland.

The urban and rural centres are:

- Chümoukedima District: Chümoukedima, Medziphema, Sovima, Kirha, Tenyiphe I, Tenyiphe II, Virazouma, Vidima, Rüzaphema, Seithekema, Pherima, Piphema, Sirhima, Toulazouma, Diphupar 'B' and Sodzülhou.
- Dimapur District: Kuda, Phevima, Signal Angami
- Niuland District: Tsiepama, Viphoma and parts of Seithekema.

=== Former Eastern Angami ===
The former Eastern Angamis have separated and are now recognised as the Chakhesang Nagas.

== Culture and society ==
Traditional Angami society was historically organized around autonomous village-states, each maintaining distinct clan genealogies and oral records of settlement.

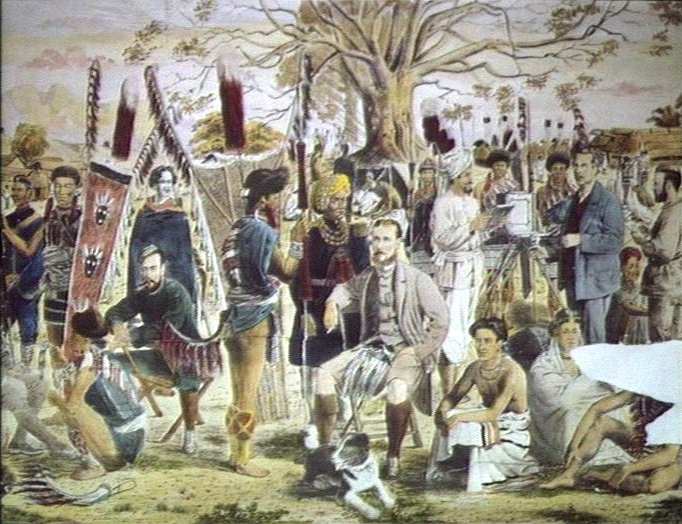
Captain Butler and assembled Nagas; seated left to right: Lt. Ridgeway, Capt. Butler, Angami Naga interpreter Sezele of Chephama, Mikir coolie. Standing left to right: Angami Naga, Inspector of Police, Angami Naga Dotsole of Chedema, Angami Naga, Rengma Naga, Commander in Chief Manipur Army, (sacred tree with skulls), ?, 2 Rengma Nagas, Dr Brown - Political Agent, Manipur

=== Cuisine ===
Galho is a popular Angami cuisine made from a mixture of rice, Himalayan knotweed, vegetables, and meats (pork or beef), etc. Rice is an important part of their diet.

=== Religion ===
The majority of Angami Naga follow the Christian faith, whilst only .77% follow animism.

- Christianity

Christian missionary activity among the Angami began in the late 19th century. The first missionary to work among the Angami Nagas was the American Baptist missionary Rev. C. D. King and his wife, who established the mission work at Kohima in 1881. Today, the majority of Angami Nagas identify as Christian, predominantly adhering to Baptist Christianity.

- Other religions

The traditional Angami religion is known as Pfütsana or Krüna. Although more than 99% of the Angamis are Christian, they are among the few Nagas with a surviving indigenous religious minority. According to the 1991 Census of India, there were 1760 practitioners of Pfütsana, a figure which declined to 884 in the 2001 census. Practitioners are concentrated in several villages in the southern part of Kohima District. In 1987, the religious organisation Japfüphiki Pfütsana was established to preserve and institutionalise indigenous Angami religious practices.

=== Festivals ===
- Sekrenyi

The Angamis celebrate a ten-day festival called Sekrenyi. A purification festival is observed to wash off past sins.

- Te–l Khukhu

Te–l Khukhu is a festival that falls on the 13th of Chünyi (July). It is a time of giving and sharing food with each other. This is the only festival dedicated to girls. Gone were the days when different animistic rituals were performed, but with the advent of Christianity, the rituals were no longer performed. Today, it is celebrated as a time of get-togetherness and sharing with the dear and near ones.

- Other Festivals

Other notable festivals include Terhünyi, Ngonyi, Chadanyi, and Kerunyi.

== Language ==
There are several dialects of the Angamis, the most prominent being Khwüno Dialect (around Western Angami area), Kewhi Dialect (in the Northern Angami area) and Viswe Dialect or Keyho Dialect (in the Southern Angami area). Tenyidie is the prestige dialect, used for publications and taught in the schools.

== Gallery ==
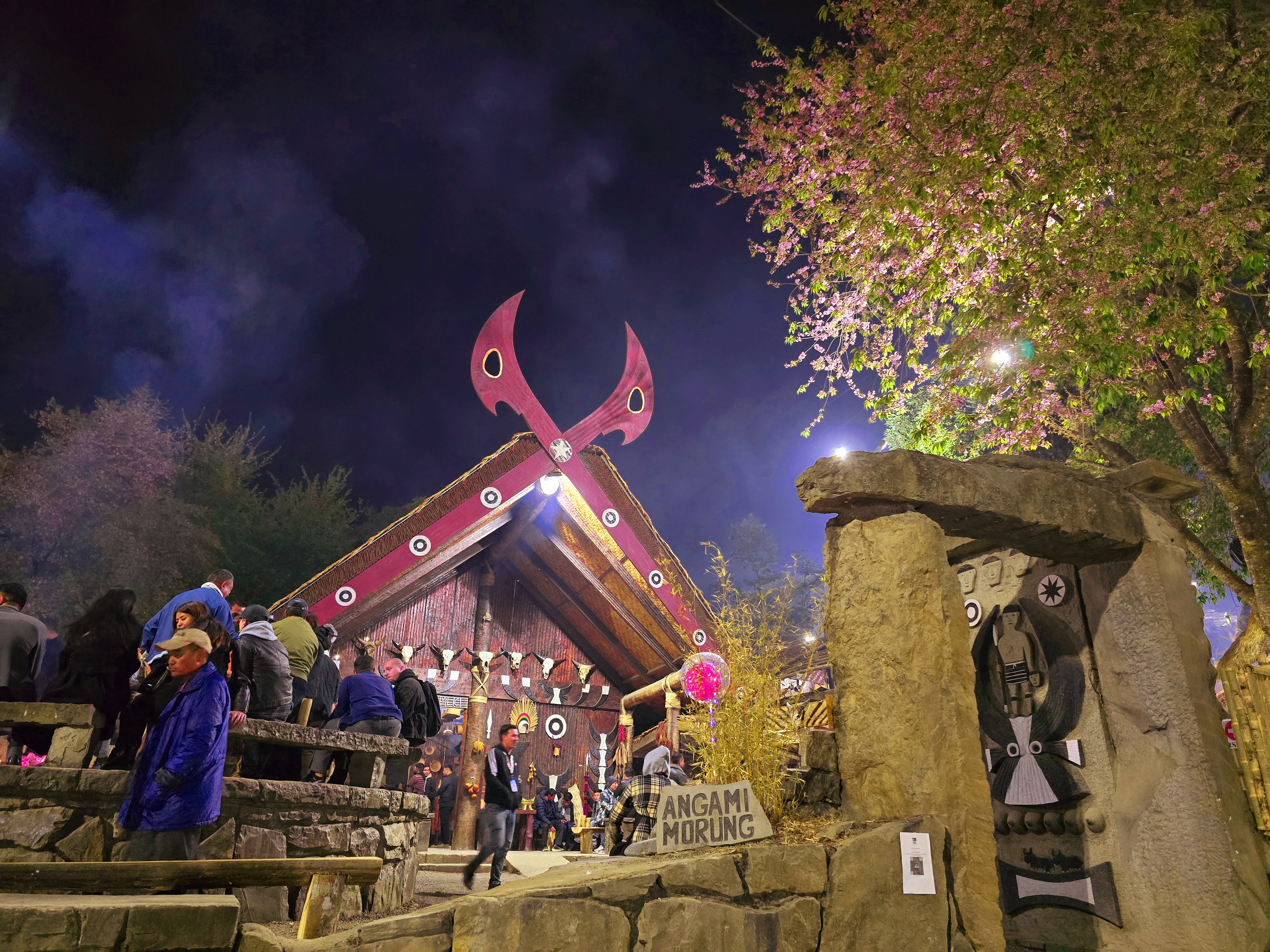
Angami Kichuki (Morung)

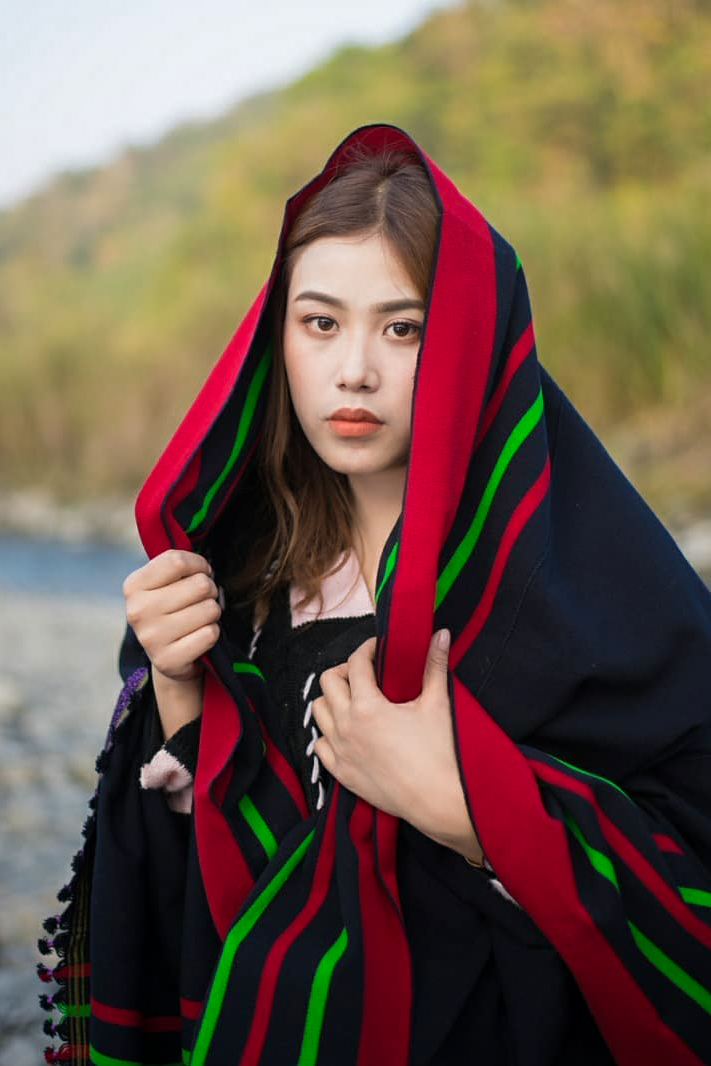
Angami Naga girl in her traditional attires

Angami women

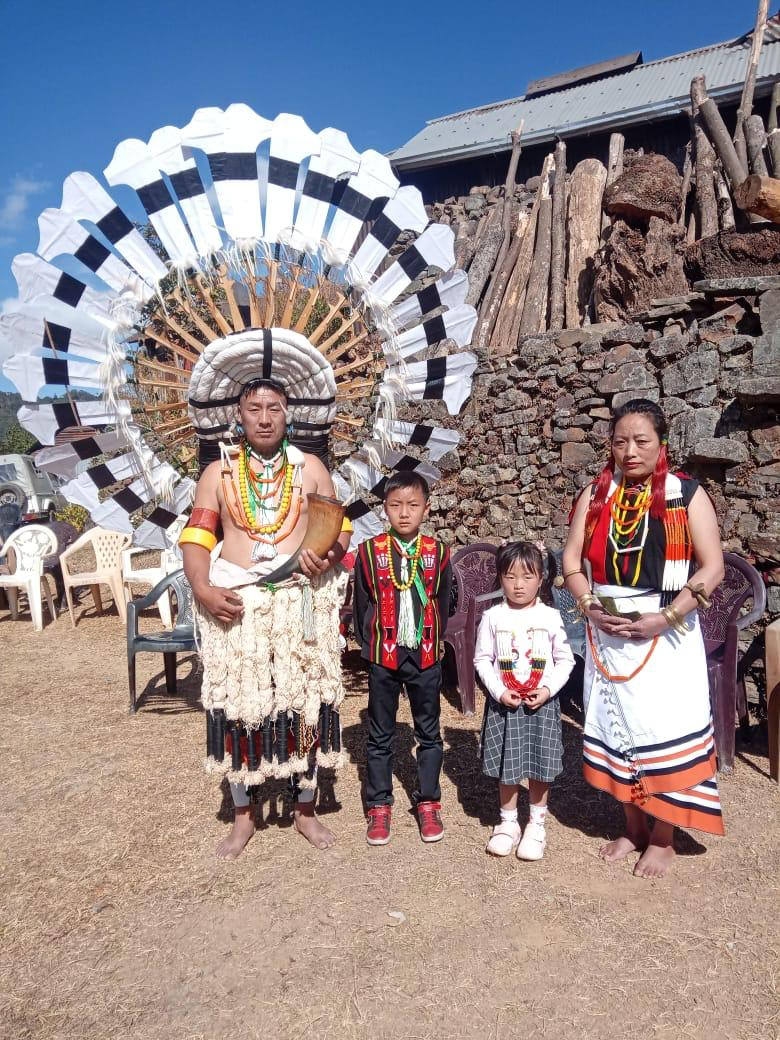
Angami Naga family

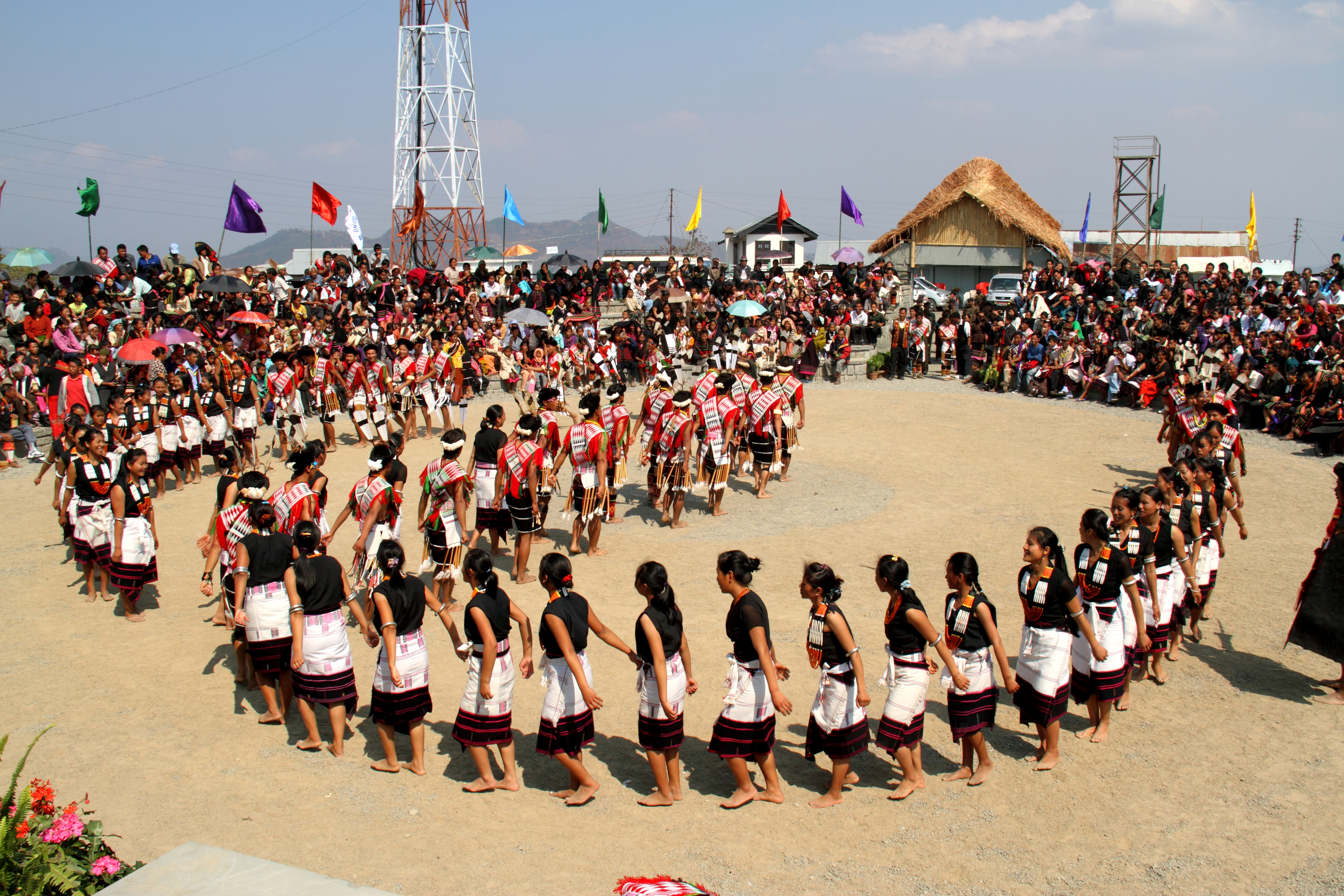
Angami Nagas performing a traditional dance

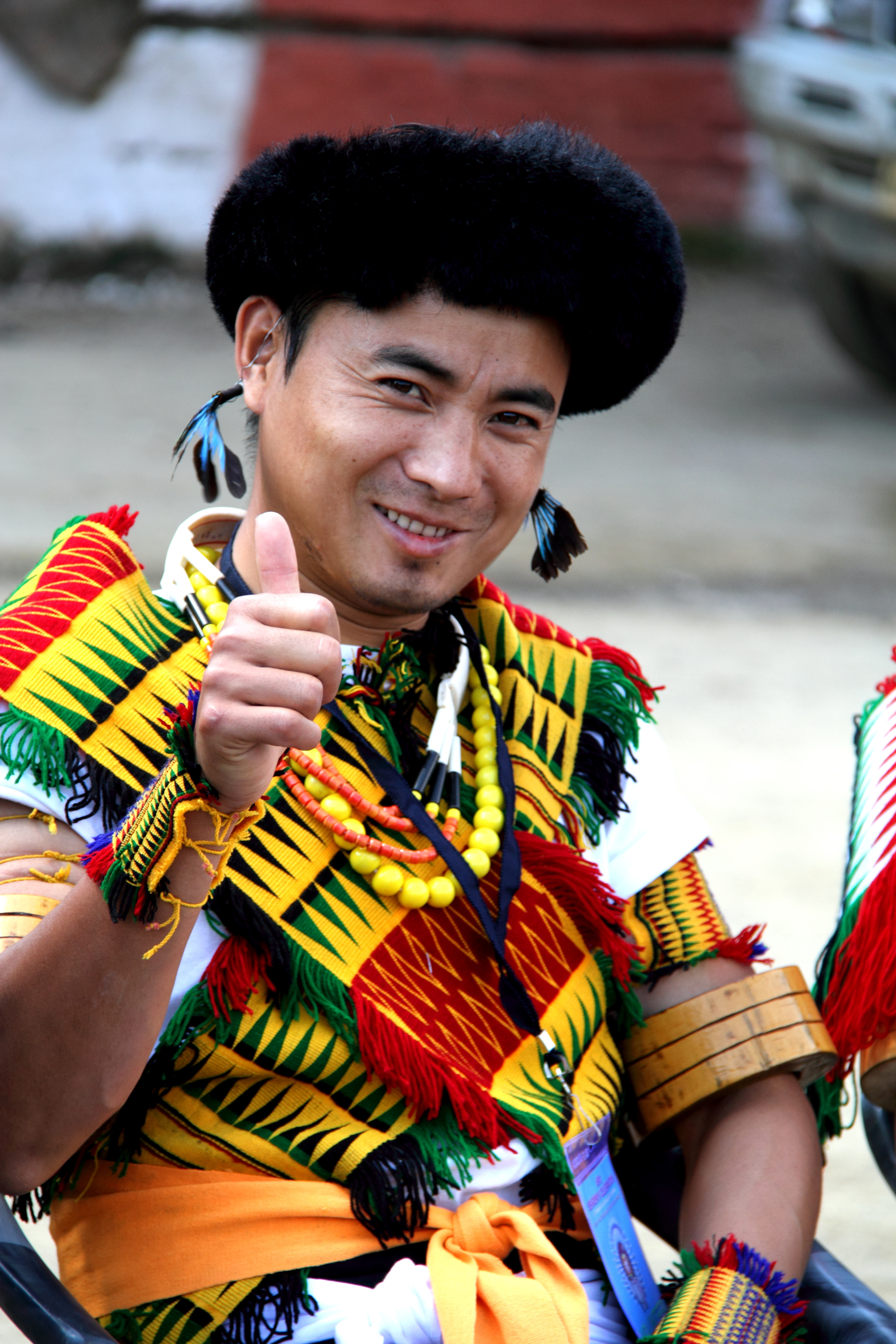
Angami Naga man in his traditional attires

== See also ==
- List of Naga ethnic groups
- Angami Baptist Church Council
- Angami name
- Angami Public Organization
- Angami Women Organization
- Index of Angami-related articles
