= Chümoukedima metropolitan area =

Area of Chümoukedima in Nagaland, India

Chümoukedima Metropolitan Area
- Metropolitan area
- Interactive map of Chümoukedima Metropolitan Area
- Coordinates: 25.811766°N 93.758827°E
- Country: India
- State: Nagaland
- District: Chümoukedima district
- City: Chümoukedima

Area
  - Metro: 600 km^{2} (230 sq mi)

Population (2011)
  - Urban: 125,400
- Major Urban Centres: Chümoukedima (includes 11 wards); Medziphema; Sovima; Tenyiphe-I; Tenyiphe-II; Diphupar; Naga United; Chekiye

Chümoukedima Metropolitan Area is the metropolitan area of Chümoukedima and its surrounding region, located in south-west Nagaland, India. It is the largest metropolitan area in Nagaland and the third largest in population after Dimapur and Kohima. It covers an area of approximately 600 km^{2} (231 mi^{2}). The region forms the commercial, financial, and industrial centre of Nagaland. The largest city is Chümoukedima, followed by Medziphema. (Note: Chümoukedima District was carved out of Dimapur District on 18 December 2021 and was officially inaugurated on 29 June 2022.)

== Transport ==
The Dimapur Airport serves the metropolis, currently the only airport in Nagaland

The Asian Highway 1 and Asian Highway 2, as well as the NH29, pass through the region.

Chümoukedima Shokhüvi Railway Station is the only operating railway station in the region.

== See also ==
- Geography of Nagaland
