= Alobo Naga =

Indian singer and songwriter (born 1984)

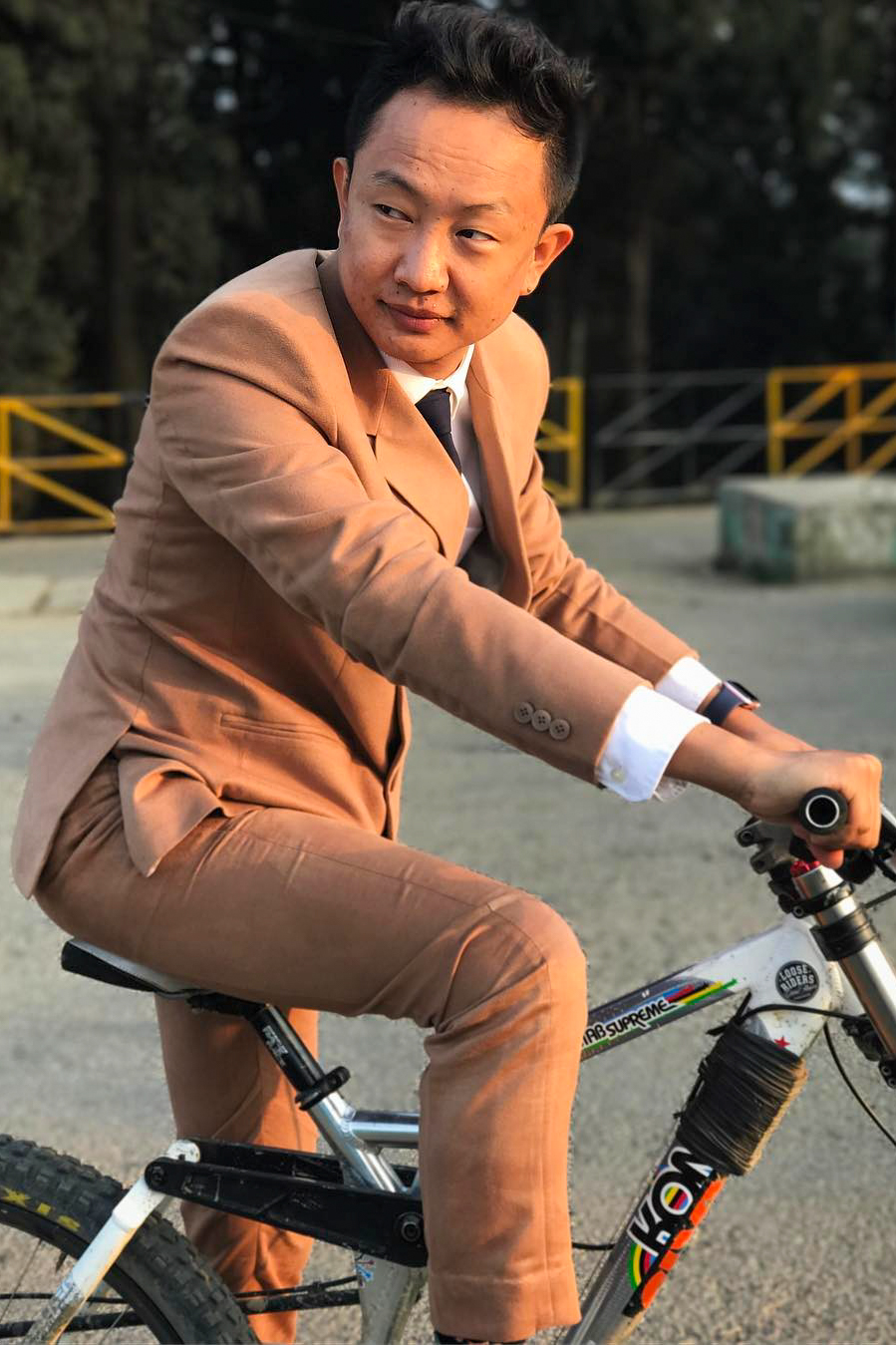
- Alobo Naga in Kohima, 2017
- Born: Alobo Achümi; 6 May 1984 (age 42); Kohima, Nagaland, India
- Education: University of Delhi
- Occupations: Singer; songwriter; composer; music recording artist
- Years active: 2001–present
- Spouse: Kiniholi Jakha (m. 2022)
- Musical career
- Origin: Dimapur, Nagaland
- Genres: Pop; folk; pop-rock; rap

Alobo Achümi (born 6 May 1984), known professionally as Alobo Naga, is an Indian singer and songwriter from Nagaland. He rose to fame with his debut album, Road of a Thousand Dreams. He has hosted his talk show, The Alobo Naga Show, since July 2021.

== Early life ==
Alobo Naga was born on 6 May 1984 in Kohima, Nagaland to a Naga family. He did his schooling from Charity School, Kohima; Assembly of God School, Dimapur; Greenwood School, Kuda; and completed his B.A. in Political science from Patkai Christian College in Chümoukedima. He later attended University of Delhi from 2004 to 2007.

In 2008, he left his full-time job at a construction firm and began studying music.

== Career ==
In 2010, he formed Alobo Naga & The Band (ANTB) and launched his first album in Nagaland. The band rose to fame in 2011 with their video single "Painted Dreams". It premiered in August 2011 on VH1. Later that year, Alobo Naga & The Band started touring the world.

His second album, Kini was launched in 2017.

On 25 February 2019, mobs who were protesting (against the Arunachal Government's decision to provide permanent residence certificates to non-Arunachal Pradesh Scheduled Tribe residents) set ablaze his band's vehicle containing all their musical instruments at the venue of the Itanagar International Film Festival (IIFF). Protesters burnt several other vehicles and buildings. He was among the many other artists from other northeastern states who were in Arunachal Pradesh to perform at the 1st Itanagar International Film Festival.

He is the Founder and Director of Musik-A also known as Alobo Naga School of Music. He has also found success on Youtube with his talk show The Alobo Naga Show.

== Personal life ==
On 20 March 2022, Alobo Naga in his Instagram post announced his engagement with Kiniholi Jakha, a former flight attendant for Jet Airways. On 21 October 2022, they married at the Agri Expo, Chümoukedima.

== Awards ==
- Winner of Best Rock Song of The Year, Best Rock Band of the Year, Best Producer of the year – "Painted Dreams" at 2011 Music Awards of Nagaland
- Winner of Best Folk Fusion song for "Kümsüjulo" at the 2011 Music Awards of Nagaland
- In 2012, his band's music video "Painted Dreams" won the Best Indian Act at the 2012 MTV Europe Music Awards (EMA).
- Governor's Award for excellence in the field of Music (2015)
- Nominated for Best Pop Artist for Radio City Freedom Awards 5
- Alobo Naga won three Awards at the 2018 Artist Aloud Music Awards.

== Discography ==
=== Solo Studio albums ===
- Road of a Thousand Dreams (2010)
- Kini 2 (2017)

=== Singles ===
- Painted Dreams (Dub Step Version) ft. DJ Ina (2012)
- Laughter & Tears (Single) 7 September 2013
- All We Have is Now – single (2014) collaborated with Tim Palmer
- Anthem Song for North East United FC (ISL) with various artiste from North East India
- Chasing Ghosts (2016)
- Never Let You Go (OST October)
- Ningu Kumtsü (Single) – 2018
- Choro Küpi (Single) – 2018
- Kikimiye Le (Single) - 2020
- Together We Can (Milikena Hatabo) – 2020
- Last Train (Single) – 2020
- Wolo (Single) -2021
- My Pomegranate Girl (Single)- 2021

=== Others ===
- Yesterday Today Forever (Various Artiste) (2001)
- Summer Jam (2003)
- Achumis (2003)
- Icons (Various Artiste) (2008)
- Kohima Komets Anthem (2012)
- General Election Theme Song (2013)
- Painted Dreams (2010)
- Beyond: OST of Bollywood Movie “Beyond”
- Pal: OST, Te Amo (Bollywood)
- The Anushree Experiment (OST)
- 2 a.m. at Lokhandwala (OST)

== Filmography ==
=== Web show ===
- The Alobo Naga Show (2021, YouTube)

=== Film scoring ===
- October
- Anushree Experiment
- Beyond the Third Kind
- Te Amo
- 2 a.m. at Lokhandwala
