= Tovihoto Ayemi =

Indian politician

H. Tovihoto Ayemi (born 1979) is an Indian politician from Nagaland. He is a member of the Nagaland Legislative Assembly from Dimapur I Assembly constituency in Dimapur district. He won the 2023 Nagaland Legislative Assembly election, representing the Bharatiya Janata Party (BJP).

== Early life and education ==
Ayemi is from Dimapur, Nagaland. He is the son of Hejeto Ayemi. He completed his BA (honors) in 2001 at Patkai Christian College, Dimapur, which is affiliated with Nagaland University.

== Career ==
In 2013 Ayemi was elected for the first time on an Naga People's Front (NPF) ticket to the Nagaland Legislative Assembly. He defeated his nearest rival, and former chief minister, K. L. Chishi of the Indian National Congress by a margin of 1838 votes. He retained the seat in the 2018 Nagaland Legislative Assembly election, beating Pukhavi Yepthomi of the Naga People's Front by a margin of 6,600 votes. In 2023, he became a three-time MLA representing the BJP again. Ayemi won from Dimapur I Assembly constituency representing the BJP in the 2023 Nagaland Legislative Assembly election. He polled 13,325 votes and defeated his nearest rival, Kewekhape Therie of the Indian National Congress, by a margin of 6,959 votes.

He is the advisor for tribal affairs and elections to the Government of Nagaland.
