= Chümoukedima (disambiguation) =

Chümoukedima is a municipality in Nagaland, India.

Chümoukedima may also refer to:

- Chümoukedima district, a district of Nagaland, India
- Chümoukedima Metropolitan Area, the Chümoukedima metropolis
