= Rangapahar Wildlife Sanctuary =

Wildlife sanctuary near Dimapur in Nagaland, India

- Location within Nagaland Location within India
- Interactive map of Rangapahar Wildlife Sanctuary
- Location: Rangapahar, Chümoukedima District, Nagaland
- Nearest city: Chümoukedima–Dimapur
- Coordinates: 25.857100°N 93.719400°E
- Area: 4.70 km^{2} (1.81 sq mi)
- Designation: Wildlife sanctuary
- Established: 1986; 40 years ago
- Governing body: Forest Department, Government of Nagaland

Rangapahar Wildlife Sanctuary is a wildlife sanctuary in the Chümoukedima District of the Indian state of Nagaland. The sanctuary spans approximately 4.7 km² (470 hectares) and was notified as a wildlife sanctuary in 1986 to conserve remnant forest patches and native wildlife in the western Nagaland landscape.

== History ==
Rangapahar was created from portions of the former Rangapahar Reserved Forest and formally notified as a wildlife sanctuary in 1986. Being one of the closest legally protected forest patches to Dimapur city, it has formed an important local conservation area since notification.

Despite notification, the sanctuary and adjacent reserved forests have faced persistent pressures from encroachment and land-use change. Media reporting has at times highlighted how encroachment complicated efforts to effectively protect forest lands in the Rangapahar area.

== Geography and climate ==
The sanctuary occupies low hills and undulating terrain near Dimapur. Vegetation is typical of semi-evergreen and mixed deciduous hill forests of the Indo–Myanmar biodiversity hotspot. The region experiences a monsoonal climate with heavy rains during the southwest monsoon and drier winters.

== Flora and fauna ==
Avifauna in the sanctuary include woodpeckers, hornbills, cuckoos and other resident and migratory species. Mammals reported from the sanctuary and neighbouring forest patches include various deer species, primates, squirrels and other small to medium mammals. The region also hosts the endangered hoolock gibbons.

== Threats and conservation ==
The major threats are illegal encroachment, expansion of agriculture, grazing and edge effects from nearby urbanisation. These pressures have historically reduced effective forest cover and complicated management of the sanctuary.

== Nagaland Zoological Park ==
The Rangapahar forest landscape includes the Nagaland Zoological Park, established in 2008 and managed by the Nagaland Forest Department. The zoo has been active in regional conservation work and ex-situ initiatives and is affiliated with the Central Zoo Authority.

The zoo has participated in conservation milestones such as captive-breeding and rewilding efforts for regionally important species.

== Public engagement and tourism ==
The sanctuary and zoological park host outreach activities, including Wildlife Week events for students, aimed at building local conservation awareness. Being close to Dimapur, Rangapahar receives visits from bird watchers, school groups and local tourists; visitors are advised to follow Forest Department guidelines to minimise disturbance.

== See also ==
- Tawi Wildlife Sanctuary
- Khawnglung Wildlife Sanctuary
