= Methaneilie Solo =

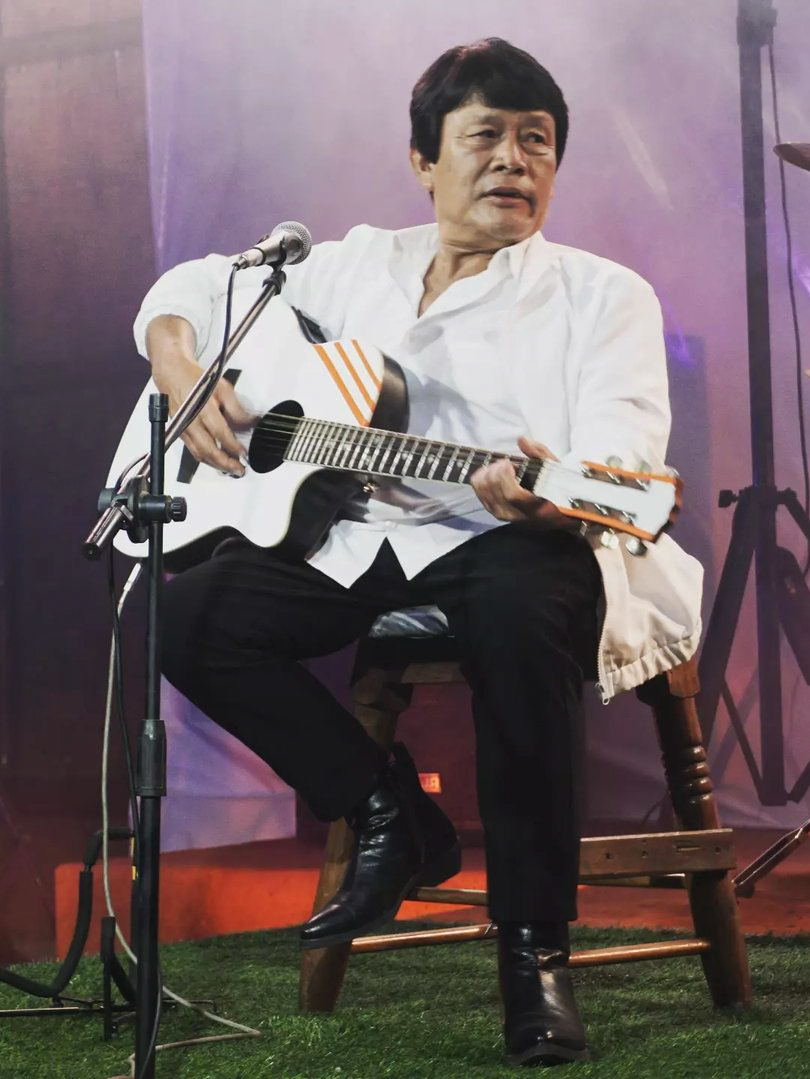
- Solo performing in 2021
- Born: Methaneilie Solo; 27 July 1955 (age 71); Kohima Village, Assam, India (now Nagaland, India)
- Occupations: Singer, songwriter
- Years active: 1968–present
- Spouse: Dziesetuonuo Solo (m. 1983)
- Children: 4
- Musical career
- Origin: Kohima, Nagaland, India
- Genres: Pop

Methaneilie Solo (born 27 July 1955), better known by his stage name Methaneilie Jütakhrie Solo, is an Indian singer and composer from Nagaland who became successful as a musician in the 1980s and 1990s.

== Early years ==
Methaneilie Solo was born on 27 July 1955 to an Angami Naga family from the Tsütuonuomia Thinuo of Kohima Village. His mother and father were Khrienuo and Zajükhrie Solo. Solo became hunchbacked at the age of four after a wrestling match with his brother and could study only up to 4th class. However, his parents and friends encouraged him to sing.

== Career ==
Methaneilie Solo composed his first song in 1973, and recorded his first album in 1984. In 1993, his 12th volume of cassette was released which includes recording in his own Angami dialect (Tenyidie), as well as translations from other tribal languages and Hindi. He has recorded 250 songs, and has composed 187 songs himself.

A few of his popular Tenyidie songs are:

- "Kekhrie"
- "Pfütsero"
- "Sievü No"
- "Dzükou"
- "Nagamia Rüli"
- "Oh Kohima"

"Whiskey", "I Call Her Darling" and "Nagaland City Kuribole" are some of his popular Nagamese songs.

== Discography ==
- ‘Jütakhrieko’ (1984)

== Awards and nominations ==
On 26 October 2021, Solo was awarded the ‘Lifetime Achievement Award’ at the 13th Music Awards of Nagaland held at RCEMPA.

== Personal life ==
=== Family ===
Solo married Dziesetuonuo in 1983. Together the couple has two daughters and two sons.
