= Bade, Chümoukedima District =

Bade
- Village and Metropolitan area
- Location of Bade Bade (India)
- Coordinates: 25°49′14″N 93°40′14″E
- Country: India
- Region: Northeast India
- State: Nagaland
- District: Chümoukedima District

Population (2011)
  - Total: 2,289
  - Official: English
- Time zone: UTC+5:30 (IST)
- PIN: 797113
- Website: nagaland.nic.in

Bade is a village located in the Chümoukedima District of Nagaland, India, and is a suburb of Chümoukedima, the district headquarters.

== Demographics ==
Bade is situated in the Chümoukedima District of Nagaland. As per the Population Census 2011, there are a total 497 households in Bade. The total population of Bade is 2289.

== See also ==
- Chümoukedima District
