= Angami Baptist Church Council =

Association in the Nagaland Baptist Church Council

Coordinates: 25.676°N 94.111°E

- Classification: Protestant
- Orientation: Baptist
- Associations: Nagaland Baptist Church Council
- Region: Nagaland, India
- Origin: 1885; 141 years ago Kohima, Nagaland
- Congregations: 111
- Members: 42,880
- Official website: www.abcconline.org

The Angami Baptist Church Council (ABCC) is one of the 20 associations in the Nagaland Baptist Church Council (NBCC). Through the NBCC, the ABCC is part of the Baptist World Alliance (BWA). Its headquarters, Kohima, is the second station of the American Baptist Foreign Missionary Society in Nagaland, India.

== History ==
In 1878 Mrs. and Rev. C. D. King, the first American Baptist Missionary to the Angamis arrived in Chümoukedima. But they had to flee back to Sibsagar due to the hostilities between the Angamis and the British. After the British finally established their administrative headquarters at Kohima in 1879, Mrs. and Rev C. D. King arrived in Kohima on 25 February 1881 with the Gospel.

On 29 March 1883, the Kohima Baptist Church was established. In 1885, four Angamis from Kohima accepted Christ and were baptized. Unfortunately, when the King family left for the USA because of health reasons, these early believers left the faith. However, in 1887, Mrs. Hattie and Dr. Sidney W. Rivenburg transferred from Molung, Assam, Nagaland to Kohima to restart the work. After laboring for five years, they saw their first convert. And thereafter slowly but steadily men and women from other villages started coming to Christ. Mrs. Hattie E. Rivenburg died in Kohima and is buried on the A.B.C.C. compound. Dr. Rivenburg continued to work among the Angami people until 1923.

== Present day ABCC ==
As of 2023, the Council has 111 Churches with about 42,880 baptized members and 57 ordained ministers and 118 licentiate pastors. The Council runs three institutions- Baptist High, Baptist College and Shalom Bible Seminary. The Council has 6 Departments- Women, Youth, Men, Christian Education & Literature, Missions, Property & Socio-Economic Development. Dr. Rachülie Vihienuo is the present Executive Director of the Council.

The ABCC celebrated its 125 years of ministry at Kohima in February 2010. During the four-day celebration (3 to 7 February 2010), the Council donated $8,744 towards Haiti earthquake relief.

== Theology and practice ==
As a member of the Universal Body of the Lord Jesus Christ, the ABCC believes in the:

- Priesthood of all Believers.
- One personal God, eternally existent in three persons - Father, Son and Holy Spirit.
- The Bible as the Word of God is the divine inspiration, authentic and final authority, sufficient for our faith.
- Freedom from every kind of Slavery
- Believers Baptism through immersion.

=== Church and State ===
The ABCC is not against the political aspirations of the Naga people but, with the NBCC, the ABCC is against and will oppose the unbiblical ideologies and means to attain those aspirations. Affirming the State-Church separation, the ABCC resolved not to participate in state/political group sponsored programs that undermine the State-Church separation.

== Missions and affiliated organizations ==
=== Mission Department ===
The Mission Department was established in 1980. At present the Council has 41 Missionaries and 20 Native Evangelists serving in different fields.

- International Fields: Nepal, Thailand, Chad (North Central Africa), Gambia (South Africa), Cambodia, Bhutan, Myanmar, Kyrgyzstan, East Timor, Laos.
- National Fields: Sikkim, Chandigarh, Assam, Nagaland-Assam Border.
- Fields in Nagaland: Reaching Non-locals in Chümoukedima, Dimapur and Kohima.
- Fields in partnership with other Missions agencies: West Bengal, Bangalore, Manipur, Nsong, Mumbai, and Delhi.

=== Youth Department ===
The Angami Baptist Youth Department (ABYD) was officially established in 1932 with the missionary Rev. J. E. Tanquist and his wife Mabel Tanquist. Initially it was called Angami Christian Endeavour Union (ACEU). The ABYD celebrated its 75 Years of ministry in the year 2007 at Khonoma. The objective of ABYD is to help and equip the Youth members to share their faith with others as well as to develop second line leadership for evangelism. Focusing on this, the ABYD organizes seminars and trainings every year. One of the notable contributions by the ABYD is in the area of Music. Currently, the department is emphasizing on Sports Ministry and True Love Waits (TLW) seminars in order to reach the youth members even outside the Church.

=== Seminaries and Colleges ===
Apart from evangelism and other Church activities, as part of its endeavor towards spiritual development, the ABCC gives equal importance to human resources development with Christian values. Towards this, there are three (3) institutions:

- Baptist High: Established in 1959, it is a Higher Secondary School in Science stream.
- Baptist College: Established in 1982, the College offers Bachelor’s Degree in Arts and Commerce streams.
- Shalom Bible Seminary (SBS): Established in 1996, SBS offers B.Th., M.Div., and M.Th. Degrees.

== Angami (Tenyidie) Bible ==
=== History ===
Bible Translation works happened to be one of the priorities of the American missionaries. The first translation of the Book of Matthew was started by Rev. C. D. King. However, he could not complete as he left for home. Later, it was translated by Rev. Dr. S. W. Rivenburg in 1890. He also translated the Books of John and Acts. Miss Narola, the daughter of Rivenburg, translated the Book of Mark in 1915. In the same year the Book of Luke was translated by Rev. J.E. Tanquist. Revelation, the last Book of the New Testament was translated in 1918. Consequently, through the efforts or the missionaries and native leaders, the New Testament was brought out in 1927.

Translation of the Old Testament started around 1940, and a good portion was translated. But during the Battle of Kohima in 1944, all the manuscripts were lost. Vigorous translation then began again and the Book of Genesis was published in 1950. However most of the manuscripts (of the remaining books) were again destroyed during the Indo-Naga conflicts in 1956.

=== The Release of the Angami (Tenyidie) Bible ===
In 1966 the Angami Baptist Women took the initiative in helping translation works again. The long expected Tenyidie Bible of the Angami Nagas was finally released and presented on 20 December 1970, with a huge congregation of thanksgiving, held at Kohima Local Baptist Church.

=== Fresh Translation Works ===
The revised edition of the New Testament was released in December 1995. With regard to the Old Testament revision, the project began in 1986. The new translation of the Old Testament was released in 2009.

== See also ==
- Ao Baptist Arogo Mungdang
