= Diezephe =

- Village and Metropolitan area
- Location of Diezephe Diezephe (India)
- Country: India
- Region: Northeast India
- State: Nagaland
- District: Chümoukedima District

Population (2011)
  - Total: 755
  - Official: English
- Time zone: UTC+5:30 (IST)
- PIN: 797116
- Website: nagaland.nic.in

Diezephe is a village located in the Chümoukedima District of the Indian state of Nagaland and is a suburb of Chümoukedima, the district headquarters. It is the site of the Diezephe Craft Museum displaying woodcarving and weaving.
