= Vidima =

Vidima may refer to:

- PFC Vidima-Rakovski Sevlievo, a Bulgarian association football club
- Vidima Village, Chümoukedima District, Nagaland, India
- Vidima, Lovech Province, a former village that is now a quarter of Apriltsi, Bulgaria
- Vidima (river), a tributary of the Rositsa in Bulgaria
- A brand of Ideal Standard bathrooms
- Ntokozo Vidima (born 1995), South African rugby union player
