= Baptist College, Kohima =

College in Nagaland

Baptist College
- Established: 23 August 1982; 43 years ago
- Affiliations: Angami Baptist Church Council, Nagaland Baptist Church Council
- Academic affiliations: Nagaland University
- Location: Kohima, Nagaland, India; 25.677°N 94.111°E
- Campus: Urban
- Website: baptistcollege.in

Baptist College is a Baptist in Kohima, Nagaland, India. It is affiliated with the Angami Baptist Church Council (Nagaland Baptist Church Council). It offers undergraduate courses in Arts and Commerce and is affiliated to the Nagaland University.

== History ==
The college was established in 1982 by the Angami Baptist Church Council.

== Departments ==
=== Arts and Commerce ===
- English
- History
- Political Science
- Sociology
- Commerce

== Accreditation ==
The college is recognized by the University Grants Commission (UGC).
