= Chekiye =

- Village
- Country: India
- Region: Northeast India
- State: Nagaland
- District: Chümoukedima District

Population (2011)
  - Total: 7,105
  - Official: English
- Time zone: UTC+5:30 (IST)
- PIN: 797113
- Website: nagaland.nic.in

Chekiye is a village located in the Chümoukedima District of Nagaland and is a suburb of Chümoukedima, the district headquarters.

== Demographics ==
Chekiye is situated in the Chümoukedima District of Nagaland. As per the Population Census 2011, there are a total 1293 households in Chekiye. The total population of Chekiye is 7105.

== See also ==
- Chümoukedima District
