= Naga United =

- Village
- Country: India
- Region: Northeast India
- State: Nagaland
- District: Chümoukedima District

Population (2011)
  - Total: 1,492
  - Official: English
- Time zone: UTC+5:30 (IST)
- PIN: 797113
- Website: nagaland.nic.in

Naga United is a village located in the Chümoukedima District of Nagaland and is a suburb of Chümoukedima, the district headquarters.

== Demographics ==
Naga United is situated in the Chümoukedima District of Nagaland. As per the Population Census 2011, there are a total 288 households in Naga United. The total population of Naga United is 1,492.

== See also ==
- Chümoukedima District
