= Kirha =

- Village and Metropolitan area
- Interactive map of Kirha
- Location of Kirha Kirha (India)
- Coordinates: 25.877005°N 93.766256°E
- Country: India
- Region: Northeast India
- State: Nagaland
- District: Chümoukedima District

Population (2011)
  - Total: 707
  - Official: English
- Time zone: UTC+5:30 (IST)
- PIN: 797112
- Website: nagaland.nic.in

Kirha is a village located in the Chümoukedima District of Nagaland and is a suburb of Chümoukedima, the district headquarters.

== History ==
Kirha was founded by members of Kirhazou-mi Clan from Viswema in Kohima District.

== Demographics ==
Kirha is situated in Chümoukedima District of Nagaland. As per the Population Census 2011, there are total 168 families residing in Kirha. The total population of Kirha is 707.

== See also ==
- Chümoukedima District
