= Sovima =

- Village and Metropolitan area
- Location of Sovima
- Coordinates: 25.842917°N 93.773237°E
- Country: India
- Region: Northeast India
- State: Nagaland
- District: Chümoukedima District
- Established: 1966

Government
  - Type: Village Council
  - Body: Sovima Village Council
  - Chairman: Sebastian Zümvü

Population (2011)
  - Total: 1,839
  - Official: English
- Time zone: UTC+5:30 (IST)
- PIN: 797115
- Sex ratio: 961 ♂/♀
- Website: nagaland.nic.in

Sovima is an Angami Naga village located in Chümoukedima District of Nagaland, India and is a suburb of Chümoukedima, the district headquarter.

== History ==
Sovima was founded in 1966.

== Demographics ==
Sovima is situated in Chümoukedima District of Nagaland. As per the Population Census 2011, there are total 374 families residing in Sovima, with an approximated population count of 1839 inhabitants.

== Education ==
Colleges

- Tetso College

Universities

- ICFAI University
- St Joseph University

== Sports ==
The Nagaland Cricket Association Stadium is located in Sovima.

== Notable activities ==
In 2025 and 2026, ICFAI University, Nagaland, located in Sovima, hosted cybersecurity education sessions in partnership with NexusCipherGuard India, a cybersecurity firm based in Kohima. These included an expert talk on AI and a digital safety workshop conducted for students and faculty.

== See also ==
- Chümoukedima District
