= Dimapur Government College =

College in Nagaland

Coordinates: 27.3141°N 88.6002°E

- Motto: Try Trust Triumph
- Type: Undergraduate college
- Established: 1966; 60 years ago
- Affiliations: Nagaland University
- Principal: Dr. T. Tiakaba Jamir
- Location: Dimapur, Nagaland, India
- Campus: Urban
- Website: dimapurgovtcollege.in

Dimapur Government College (DGC), established in 1966, is a general degree college located in Dimapur, Nagaland. It offers undergraduate courses in arts and commerce and is affiliated to Nagaland University.

== History ==
The college was started in 1966 through the initiative of people in the town to address the need of a higher education institution for those who could not afford to go elsewhere for education. It was inaugurated on 25 July 1966 by Mhondamo Kithan, then the Education Minister in the Nagaland Government. It was then known as Dimapur College. In the first year of its operation, it had seven faculty members and 83 students enrolled in its Arts programme.

The college was then affiliated to Gauhati University. After the establishment of North-Eastern Hill University in 1973, college received affiliation to the new university from 1974 to 1993. The college is now affiliated with Nagaland University since its erection in 1989. The Government of Nagaland took over the administration and finances of the college on 1 February 1989 and it was renamed as Dimapur Government College.

== Departments ==
=== Arts and Commerce ===
- Economics
- Bengali
- English
- Tenyidie
- History
- Political Science
- Education
- Commerce
- Philosophy
- Hindi

=== Vocational programmes ===
- Hospitality and Management
- Floriculture

== Accreditation ==
The college is recognised by the University Grants Commission (UGC).
