= Eastern Christian College, Dimapur =

Coordinates: 25.897927°N 93.755486°E

Eastern Christian College

Location
- Padumpukhuri; Dimapur; India

Information
- Type: College
- Motto: "Knowledge is Power"
- Established: 1992; 34 years ago
- Principal: Sivichan T Joseph
- Gender: Co-Education
- Classes offered: Arts and Commerce
- Language: English
- Campus: Urban
- Affiliation: Nagaland University
- Website: http://eccnagaland.edu.in/

Eastern Christian College is an Arts and Commerce College located at Padumpukhuri, Dimapur, Nagaland.

== History ==
The college was an initiative of a group of people who thought of providing education to localities at an affordable price. Thus the college was established in 1992.

== Affiliations ==
The college was given approval by the Higher & Technical Education Government of Nagaland to open a college on 19 July 1993. In 1998 the Nagaland University granted a three-year provisional approval to open B.A Degree Course. In 2009, the Nagaland University Granted permission to open B.Com. Degree Course and B.A Sociology. In 2011 Nagaland University granted provisional affiliation to introduce B.A General (Evening Shift). The college received recognition from the University Grant Commission (UGC) Under 2(f) and 12(B) on 28 November 2006.

== At present ==
Motto of the college is "Knowledge is Power". It is a co-educational Institution. College is affiliated to Nagaland University. Mr. Sivichan T. Joseph and Ms. Adila Imchen are the respective Principal and Vice Principal of the college.
