= Nagaland Zoological Park =

Zoo in Nagaland, India

- Nagaland Zoological Park logo
- Interactive map of Nagaland Zoological Park
- 25.853371°N 93.724281°E
- Date opened: 28 August 2008; 18 years ago
- Location: Rangapahar, Chümoukedima, Chümoukedima District, Nagaland
- Land area: 176 ha (430 acres)
- No. of animals: 325
- No. of species: 40
- Annual visitors: 67,367 (2017)
- Memberships: CZA
- Major exhibits: great indian hornbill, royal bengal tiger, hoolock gibbon
- Website: http://dimapur.nic.in/Zoological%20Park.htm

The Nagaland Zoological Park is a 176-hectare (430-acre) zoo located at Rangapahar in the Chümoukedima District of Nagaland. It is Nagaland's biggest zoo and was opened to public in August 2008. The park is a part of the Rangapahar Wildlife Sanctuary.

== Gallery ==
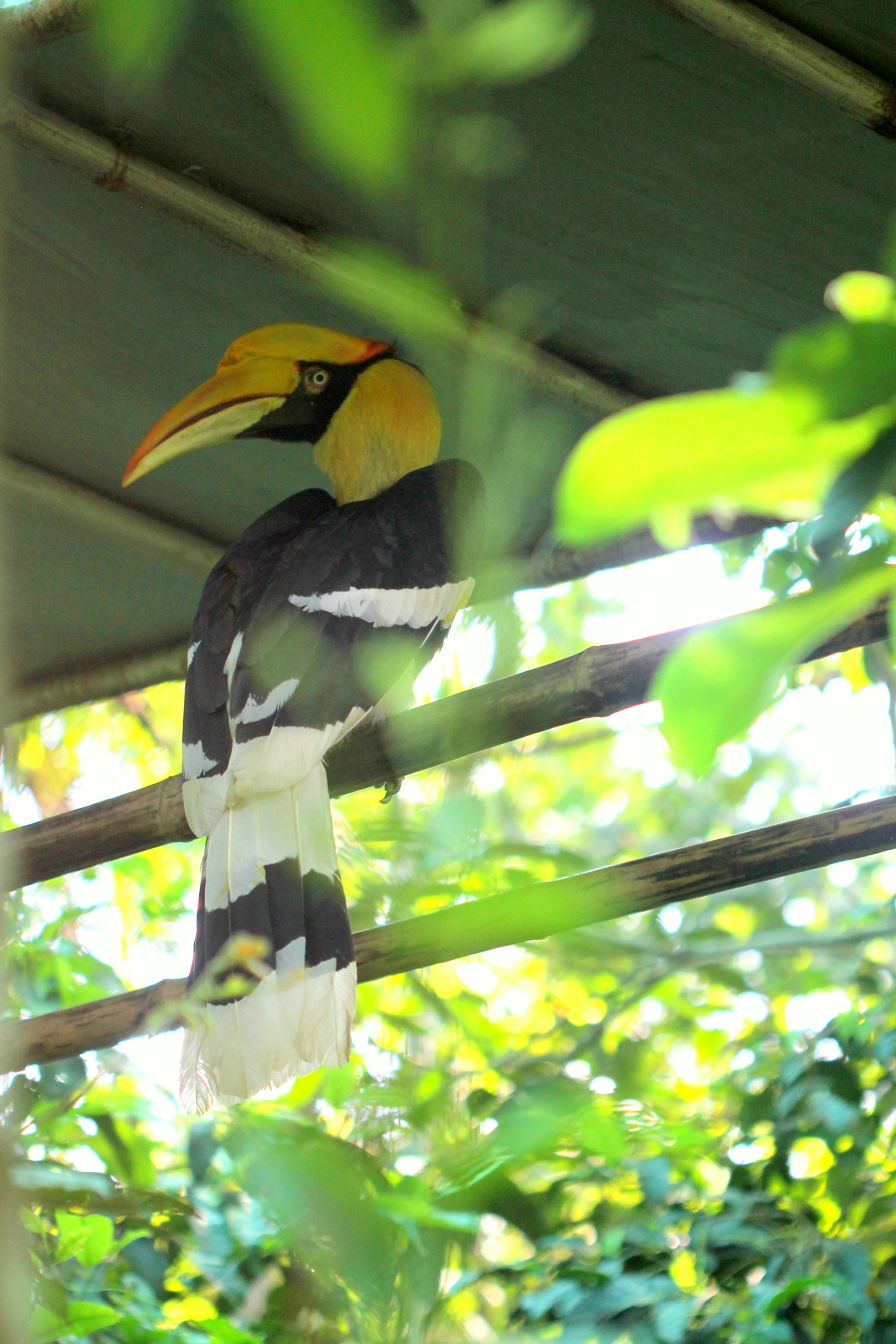
Great Indian Hornbill at Nagaland Zoological Park

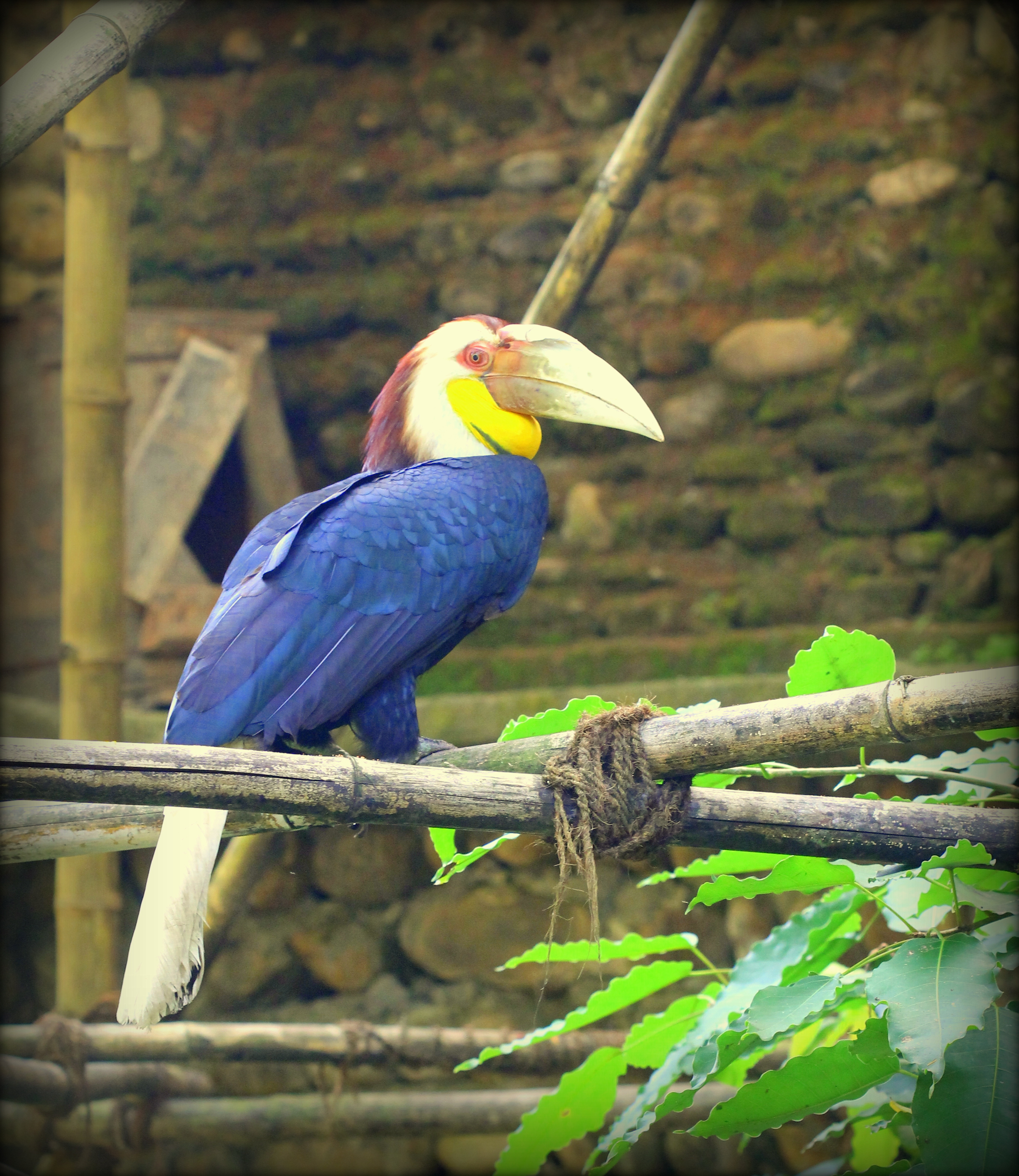
Hornbill at NZP

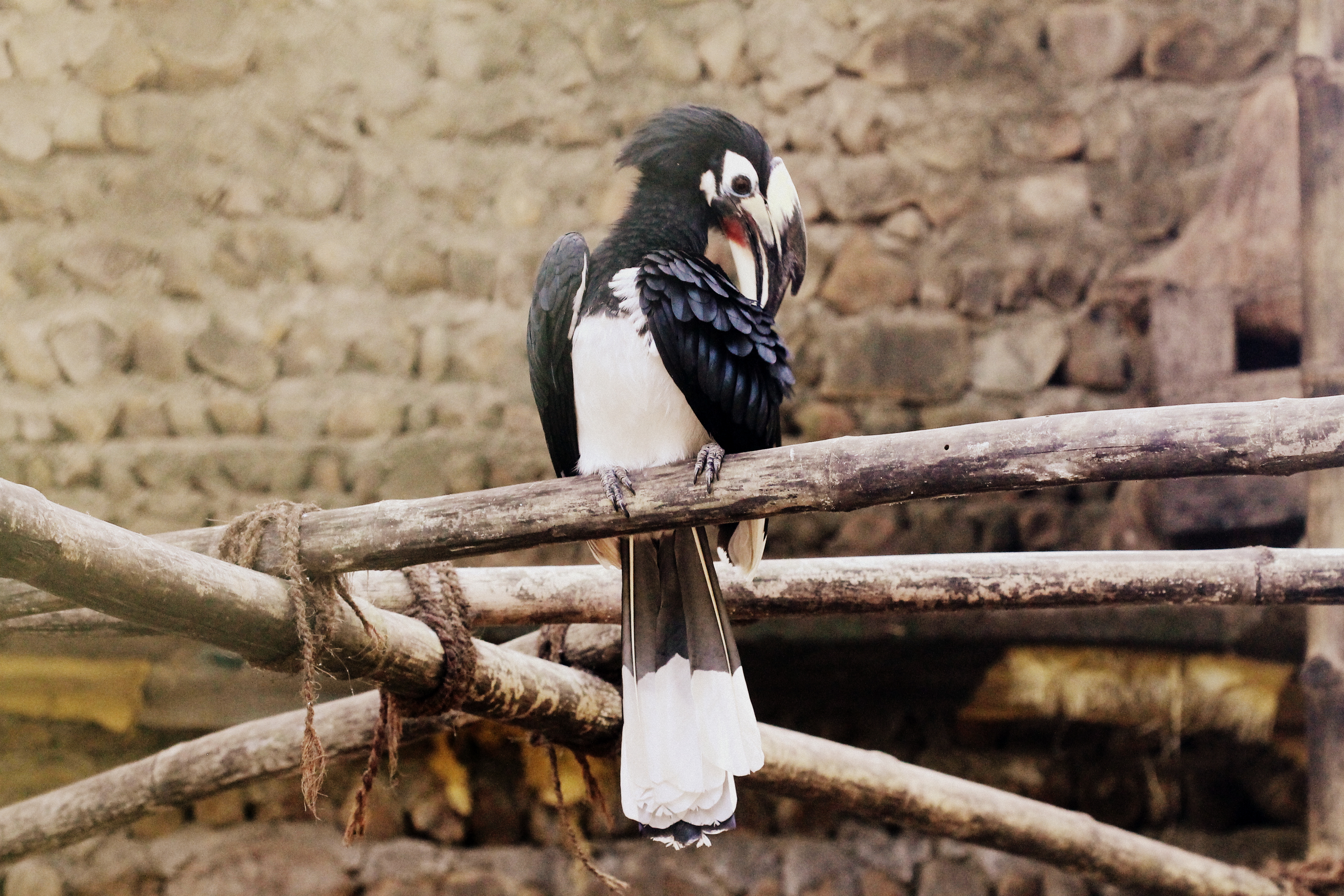
Hornbill at Nagaland Zoological Park
