= Nagaland Cricket Association Stadium =

Cricket ground

- Sovima Cricket Stadium
- Interactive map of Nagaland Cricket Association Stadium
- Location: Sovima, Chümoukedima District, Nagaland
- Country: India
- Coordinates: 25.848°N 93.755°E
- Establishment: 2012
- Capacity: 10,000
- Owner: Government of Nagaland
- Operator: Nagaland Cricket Association
- Tenants: Nagaland cricket team
- End names
- na na
- As of 12 July 2014; Source

The Nagaland Cricket Association Stadium or Sovima Cricket Stadium is a cricket stadium located at Sovima in the Chümoukedima District of Nagaland. It is the only cricket stadium in the northeastern Indian state of Nagaland.

In 2012, Nagaland Cricket Association and Government of Nagaland inaugurated a new stadium in Sovima. It cost 10.33 crores and contained all the modern technologies.

The stadium's floodlights allow it to host day-night matches.

It also has a branch of the National Cricket Academy so that players need not to travel to Guwahati and other places for training and coaching camps.

The first match played on this ground was between the Under-16 Dimapur district team and the Sovima Youth Cricket Club. Dimapur defeated Sovima Youth Cricket Club by 68 runs in this friendly match of 50 overs in April 2012.

In 2013, the stadium was the host of the Nagaland Cricket Association North East Twenty20 Cup.
