= Kohima Village =

Kohima Village Kewhira
- Village and metropolitan area
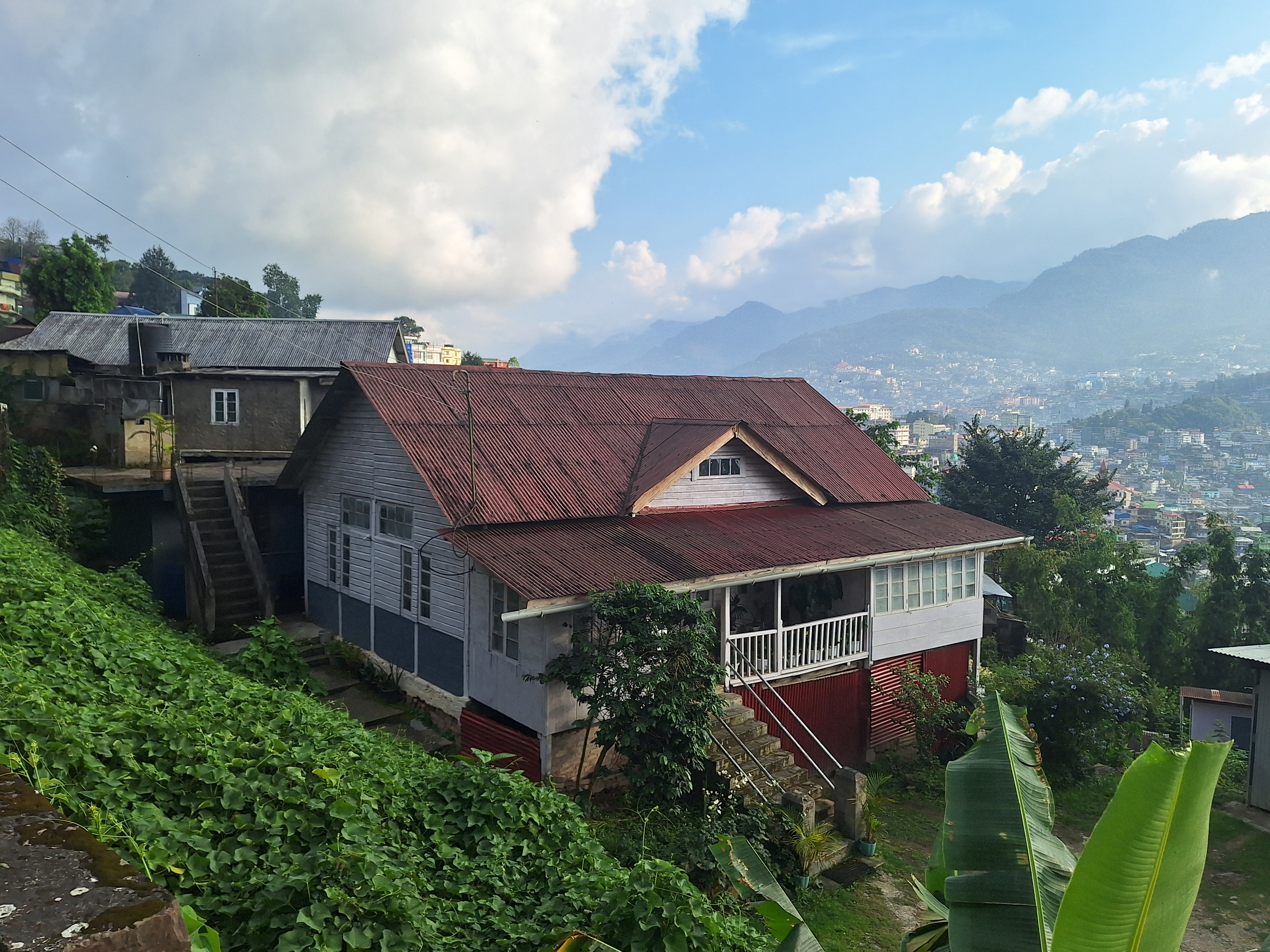
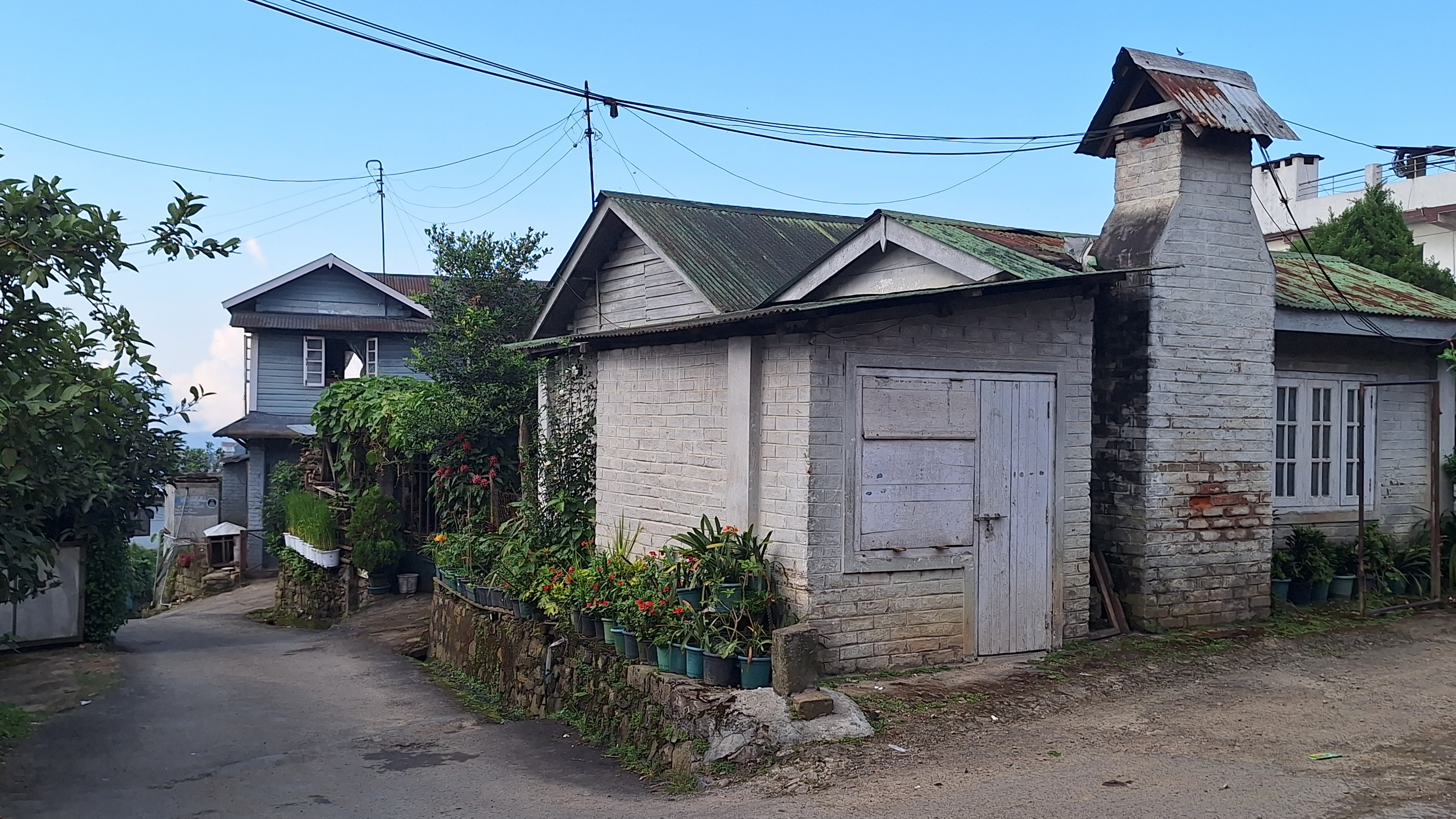
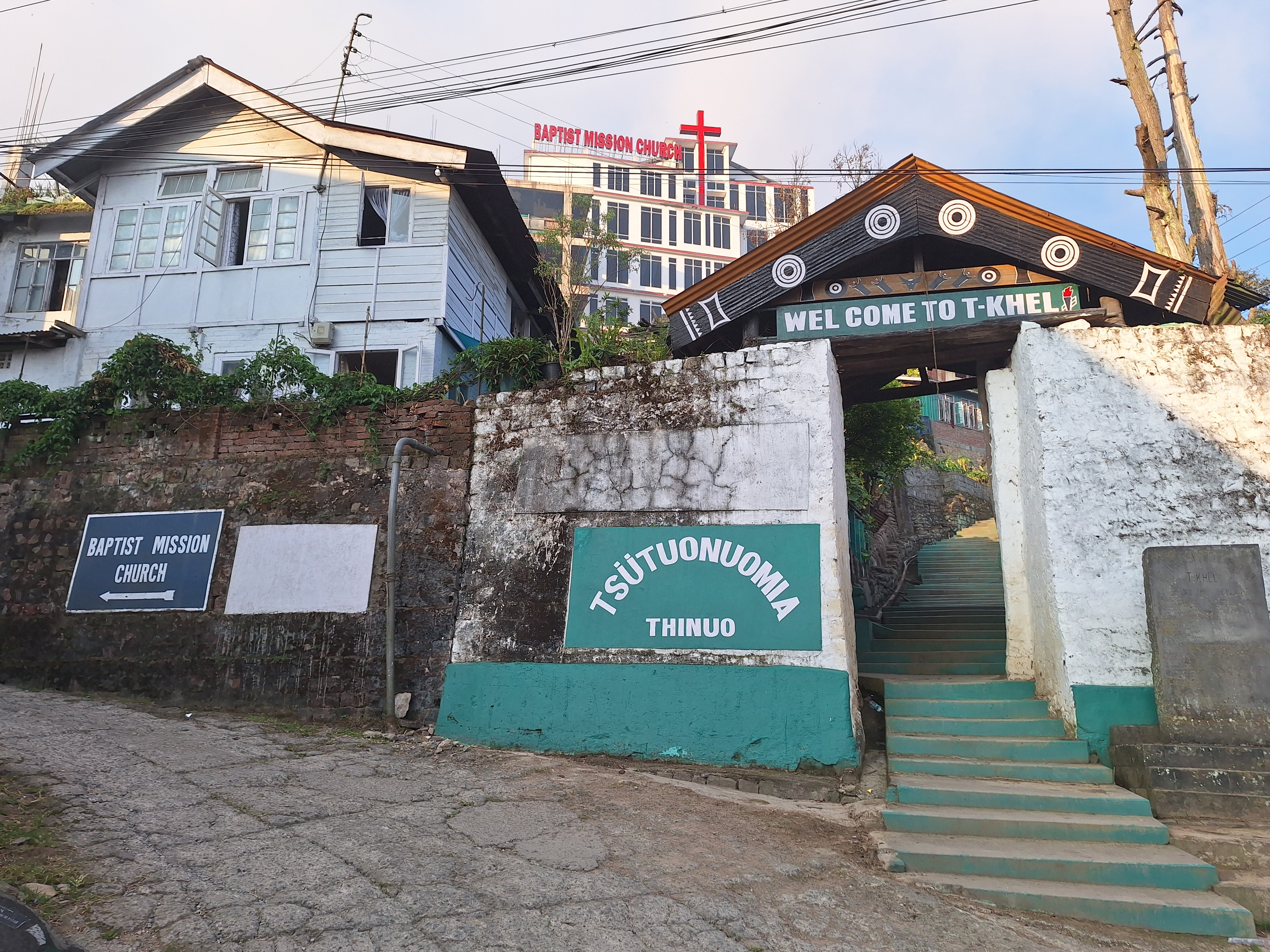
- Kohima Village Typical side street Tsütuonuomia Khel entrance gate
- Interactive map of Kohima Village
- Location of Kohima Village Kohima Village (India)
- Coordinates: 25.675°N 94.112°E
- Country: India
- Region: Northeast India
- State: Nagaland
- District: Kohima District

Government
  - Type: Village Council
  - Body: Kohima Village Council
  - Chairman: Helievi-o Solo

Population (2011)
  - Total: 15,734
- Time zone: UTC+5:30 (IST)
- PIN: 797001
- Vehicle registration: NL-01
- Sex ratio: 1013 females per 1000 males ♂/♀

Kohima Village is an Angami Naga village in Kohima District of the Indian state of Nagaland. It is located in the northeastern part of the present-day Kohima Urban Area. The village is widely considered to be the second biggest village in Asia.

== See also ==
- Kohima, the capital city of Nagaland
