= Dzüleke =

- Village
- Location of Dzüleke Dzüleke (India)
- Coordinates: 25.621°N 93.956°E
- Country: India
- Region: Northeast India
- State: Nagaland
- District: Kohima District

Population (2011)
  - Total: 156

Languages
  - Official: English
- Time zone: UTC+5:30 (IST)
- Vehicle registration: NL-01
- Sex ratio: 902 ♂/♀

Dzüleke is a village in Kohima District of the Indian state of Nagaland. The total population of the village is about 156 with 35 households.

== Tourism ==
In 1999, the village council banned trapping and hunting of wild animals of the village forest. This decision has helped increase the fauna population, especially birds, bears, deer, monkey, and mithun. The village streams also have a significant population of common snowtrout. The village council thereafter, also set up the Dzüleke Eco-Tourism Board (DETB). North East Initiative Development Agency (NEIDA), part of the Tata Trusts, has invested in training the village community in organising tourism-related activities and setting up homestays. NEIDA also set up the Dzüleke Development Fund, where the community contributes a tenth of their income from tourism-related activities towards community development. Between 2016 and 2019, over 800 tourists visited the village utilising the homestays and participating in trekking and camping activities.

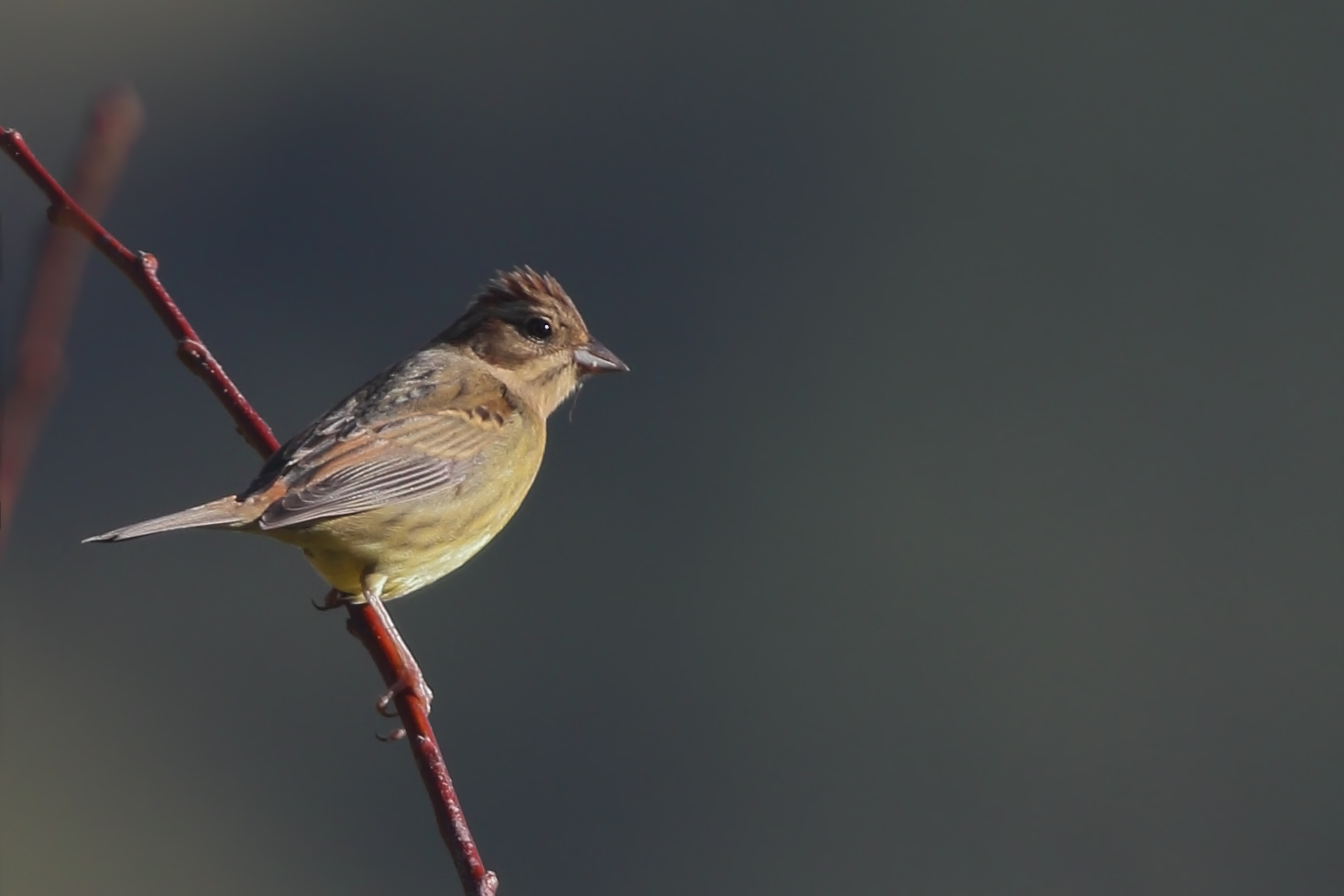
Chestnut bunting spotted in the village.
