= Tenyiphe I =

- Village and Metropolitan area
- Country: India
- Region: Northeast India
- State: Nagaland
- District: Chümoukedima District

Population (2011)
  - Total: 3,037
  - Official: English
- Time zone: UTC+5:30 (IST)
- PIN: 797103
- Website: nagaland.nic.in

Tenyiphe I is a village located in the Chümoukedima District of Nagaland and is a suburb of Chümoukedima, the district headquarters.

== Demographics ==
Tenyiphe I is situated in the Chümoukedima District of Nagaland. As per the Population Census 2011, there are a total 612 households in Tenyiphe I. The total population of Tenyiphe I is 3037.

== See also ==
- Chümoukedima District
