= Tetso College =

College in Nagaland, India

- Motto: Strive for Excellence
- Established: 1994
- Founder: P. S. Lorin
- Affiliations: Nagaland University
- Chairman: Kvulo Lorin
- Principal: Dr. Hewasa L. Khing
- Location: 5th Mile, Sovima, Chümoukedima District, Nagaland, India; 25.851579°N 93.762301°E
- Website: www.tetsocollege.org

Tetso College is a co-educational arts, commerce and management college with its main college campus located at Sovima in the Chümoukedima District of Nagaland in India. It offers Undergraduate and Post Graduate courses.

The college is affiliated to Nagaland University and NBSE. It was founded by P. S. Lorin and Shasinle Lorin. The college is sponsored by the Council of Rengma Baptist Churches (CRBC). The name of the college "Tetso" is taken from the indigenous Rengma Naga language word meaning "top".

== Campus ==
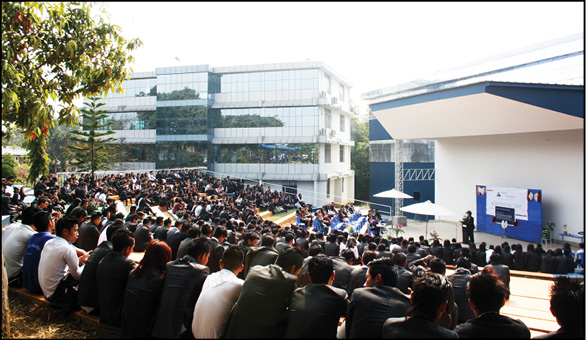
Tetso College Amphitheater
