= Kuda, Dimapur =

Village in Dimapur District, Nagaland

Kuda
- Village and Metropolitan area
- Location of Kuda
- Coordinates: 25.895534°N 93.734319°E
- Country: India
- Region: Northeast India
- State: Nagaland
- District: Dimapur District
- Established: 1941

Government
  - Type: Village Council
  - Body: Kuda Village Council
  - Chairman: Vikie Nagi

Population (2011)
  - Total: 16,108

Languages
  - Official: English
  - Major languages: Angami; Nagamese; other Naga languages
- Time zone: UTC+5:30 (IST)
- PIN: 797112
- Website: nagaland.nic.in

Kuda, formerly Nagarjan, is an Angami Naga village, located in the Dimapur District of the Indian state of Nagaland, India. Founded in 1941, Kuda is the oldest recognised Naga village in Dimapur area and one of the biggest in Nagaland. As of 2011 census, Kuda had a total population of 16,108 inhabitants.

Being located on banks of the fertile Dhansiri, the village has been the main producer and supplier of fresh vegetables and fruits to Dimapur markets. The village post-statehood, had won many awards from the State's Agriculture Department for its hard work and productivity such as "Best Farmer", "Biggest Vegetable", etc during the Annual Agri Exhibitions, when often a single Pumpkin would yield a record 10 kg, Gourds 8 kg, Cabbage 5 kg, Papaya 5 kg, etc.

== History ==
Kuda village was established in 1941. It was previously known as 'Nagarjan' but a resolution on 14 May 1999 by the Kuda Village Council officially changed the name to its present name.

== Geography ==
Kuda is bounded by Dimapur to the north, Thahekhü and Signal Angami village to the west, Dhansiri River to the east and Toulazouma to the south.

== Notable people ==
- Thepfülo-u Nakhro, Chief Minister of Nagaland from 1966 to 1969
- Kiyanilie Peseyie, Speaker of the Government of Nagaland from 2003 to 2013

== See also ==
- List of villages in Nagaland
