= National Research Centre on Mithun =

Indian research center

ICAR-National Research Centre on Mithun
- Type: Registered society
- Established: 1988; 38 years ago
- Affiliations: Indian Council of Agricultural Research
- Director: Dr. Girish Patil S.
- Location: NH 39, Medziphema, Chümoukedima District, Nagaland, India; 25.758°N 93.842°E
- Campus: Urban
- Nickname: NRCM
- Website: www.nrcmithun.res.in/home.html

ICAR National Research Centre on Mithun is an autonomous research centre in Nagaland, India for developing scientific and sustainable mithun (a type of large bovine) rearing system and for catering the needs of mithun farmers. It was established at Medziphema in the Chümoukedima District of Nagaland under the Indian Council of Agricultural Research. The mandate of the institute was redefined in 1997 and 2006.

The major function is the identification, evaluation and characterisation of mithun germplasm available in the country as well as conservation and improvement of mithun for meat and milk. To act as a repository of germplasm and information centre on mithun.

== See also ==
- Indian Council of Forestry Research and Education
- National Initiative on Climate Resilient Agriculture
