= Lumami =

Coordinates: 26.210°N 94.475°E

Lumami is a village located in the Zünheboto District of the North-East Indian state of Nagaland. It is the headquarters of Nagaland University, which is a central university established by an Act of Parliament in 1989. [Ref. :-https://lumami.nagalanduniversity.ac.in/].
