= Vidima Village =

Vidima
- Village and Metropolitan area
- Location in Nagaland Vidima (India)
- Coordinates: 25°47′32″N 93°41′53″E
- Country: India
- Region: Northeast India
- State: Nagaland
- District: Chümoukedima District

Population (2011)
  - Total: 562
  - Official: English
- Time zone: UTC+5:30 (IST)
- PIN: 797113
- Website: nagaland.nic.in

Vidima is a village located in the Chümoukedima District of Nagaland and is a suburb of Chümoukedima, the district headquarters.

== Demographics ==
Vidima is situated in the Chümoukedima District of Nagaland. As per the Population Census 2011, there are a total 121 households in Vidima. The total population of Vidima is 562.

== See also ==
- Chümoukedima District
