= St. Joseph University, Chümoukedima =

- Type: State Private University
- Established: 2016
- Chancellor: Rev. Fr. (Dr.) J. E. Arulraj
- Vice-Chancellor: Dr. D. Gnanadurai
- Location: Ikishe, Chümoukedima, Chümoukedima District, Nagaland, India; 25.852°N 93.748°E
- Website: www.stjosephuniv.edu.in

St. Joseph University, Chümoukedima is a private Catholic university located in Chümoukedima in the Indian state of Nagaland. It is run by DMI Sisters & MMI Fathers with the sole goal of providing education to the people of Nagaland. It was started in the year 2016 and is recognized by University Grants Commission (UGC), Approved by All India Council for Technical Education (AICTE).
