= Patkai Christian College =

College in Nagaland

Coordinates: 25°48′23″N 93°48′09″E

- Motto: Light and Truth
- Type: Post-Graduate College
- Established: 1974; 52 years ago
- Academic affiliations: Nagaland University
- Principal: Dr. Thepfuvilie Pierü
- Location: Chümoukedima–Seithekema, Chümoukedima District, Nagaland
- Campus: Urban
- Website: www.patkaicollege.edu.in

Patkai Christian College is a college of higher education in Chümoukedima–Seithekema, Nagaland. It is rated highest by the National Assessment and Accreditation Council in the state of Nagaland, out of 11 colleges recognised by the University Grants Commission of India. It is rated with A grade for three consecutive assessments by NAAC and also with a status of CPE (College with potential for excellence).

The NAAC team re-accredited the institution in March 2010, giving it the A grade with a CGPA of 3.06. In 2016, it was re-accredited with CGPA 3.26. Patkai Christian College was established in 1974 as a liberal Arts College.

== History ==
Patkai, of which the Nagaland Baptist Church Council and Manipur Baptist Convention are major sponsors, was started in August 1974 with twenty students. However, the college is not a denominational institution, so the college receives financial assistance from several Christian denominational churches as well as independent churches and organizations. In late 1975, Patkai was provisionally affiliated to the North Eastern Hill University, Shillong.

The college offers various courses from all available art courses, social sciences, commerce, sciences, computer sciences, business administration, and music courses.

- 1974 - College started on 28 August
- 1975 - Provisional Affiliation with NEHU
- 1985 - Honours programme in Political Science
- 1986 - Permanent Affiliation with NEHU
- 1994 - Affiliation transferred to NU.
- 1997 - B.Sc. Programme
- 2004 - Accredited B++ Grade by NAAC
- 2005 - Conferred Autonomous Status by UGC
- 2010 - Reaccredited 'A' Grade with CGPA of 3.06 by NAAC
- 2010 - Conferred 'CPE (College with potential for excellence) Status' by UGC
- 2011 - Autonomy status extended for Second term till 2016-2017
- 2012 - Delinked Higher Secondary from Degree as per UGC Guidelines.
- 2013 - M.Sc.in Environmental Science

- M.A. in English

- Recognized as ‘PG College’ by UGC

- UGC approved Certificate Course in Music

- UGC approved Certificate Course in Applied Electronics and Computer Hardwares

- UGC approved Certificate Course in IT

- Certificate Course in Communication Skills for M.A. in English

- Diploma in Computer Applications for M. Sc. Env. Sc.

- 2014 - Diploma in Computer Applications

–Bachelor of Music

- Diploma in IT

- Certificate in Counselling

- M.Sc. in Geology

- 2016 - Re-accredited with CGPA 3.26 by NAAC. First college in Nagaland to adopt the Choice-based credit system (CBCS) as per UGC guideline
- 2019 - M.A. in Political Science

== Programmes offered ==
=== Undergraduate programmes ===
- Bachelor of Arts
  - Economics
  - Education
  - English
  - History
  - Political Science
  - Philosophy
- Bachelor of Science
  - Botany
  - Chemistry
  - Geology
  - Mathematics
  - Physics
  - Zoology
  - Computer Science
- Bachelor of Commerce
- Bachelor of Computer Applications
- Bachelor of Music

=== Postgraduate programmes ===
- M. A. in English
- M. A. in Political Science
- M. Sc. In Environmental Science
- M. Sc. Geology
- M. Sc. Botany
- M. Sc. Zoology
- M. Sc. Chemistry
- M. Sc. Physics
