= ICFAI University, Nagaland =

Private university in Nagaland, India

- Established: 2006
- Affiliations: UGC
- Chancellor: Dr. T. R. K. Rao
- Vice-Chancellor: Dr. Amit Kumar Aditya
- Location: Sovima, Chümoukedima District, Nagaland, India; 25.837°N 93.762°E
- Website: Official website

ICFAI University, Nagaland, formerly known by its full name Institute of Chartered Financial Analysts of India University (Nagaland), is a private university located in Sovima, Nagaland, India. The university was established in 2006 under the Institute of Chartered Financial Analysts of India University, (Nagaland) Act 2006 and renamed in 2015 under the ICFAI University, Nagaland (Amendment) Act, 2014.

C.P. Alexander was the Vice-Chancellor (VC) of the university from 2016 until his death in 2019. Arun Kumar Varma was appointed VC in April 2021.

== Industry collaborations ==
In 2025, ICFAI University Nagaland partnered with NexusCipherGuard India, a cybersecurity firm based in Kohima, for a series of cybersecurity education sessions aimed at students and faculty. The collaboration included an expert talk on AI and a cybersecurity workshop held at the university's campus. NexusCipherGuard India has also cited the university as a key institutional partner in its cybersecurity awareness initiatives across Nagaland.
