= Medziphema =

- Town and municipality
- Interactive map of Medziphema
- Location in Nagaland, India Medziphema (India) Medziphema (Asia) Medziphema (Earth)
- Coordinates: 25.753°N 93.863°E
- Country: India
- State: Nagaland
- District: Chümoukedima District

Government
  - Body: Medziphema Town Council

Area
  - Total: 17 km^{2} (6.6 sq mi)

Population (2011)
  - Total: 8,738

Languages
  - Official: English
  - Major languages: Angami; Ao; Chakhesang; Lotha; Nagamese; Sümi
- Time zone: UTC+5:30 (IST)
- Vehicle registration: NL-07
- Website: Official website

Medziphema is a town and sub-division located in Chümoukedima District of Nagaland state of India. Medziphema Town and Medziphema Village are situated few kilometers apart, the village stands on a hill top to the north of the near-valley Town. It is located 44 km from the Capital City of Kohima, 20 km from Chümoukedima and 33 km from Dimapur. The National Highway 29 runs through the Town area.

== Geography ==
Medziphema spreads over a landscape and its altitude is about 360 m above the sea level. It is neither a hill nor a valley and it gently slope down towards the southern region from the north-eastern side of the town. This town actually represents an interface of the Hilly Nagaland and the valleys as the actual hill region more or less starts after this town as we move up towards Kohima and it overlooks the valley of Chümoukedima District. The temperature during summer ranges between 28-32 °C and winter from 10 to 15 °C. The total population of this town is around 9,000-10,000.

Other settlements in and around Medziphema Town are Pherima, Piphema, Molvom, Kukidolong, Khaibung, Sirhima, Vihokhu, Zuikhu, Rüzaphema, New Socünoma etc. Medziphema Postal Index Number is 797106

== Demographics ==
The population is a conglomerate of all the major Naga ethnic groups in the state. Angamis, the community solely inhabiting Medziphema Village also has sizable inhabitants in the Town area and consist close to 40–45% of the population approximately. Other major inhabitants includes the Lothas, Sümis, Aos, Chakhesangs, Kukis, Rengmas and to a lesser extent the tribes of Zeliangrongs, Pochurys, Sangtams, etc.

=== Religion ===
About 90–95% of the population is Christian by faith like in any other part of the State. Mostly the Christians are Baptists who were evangelised by the American Missionaries in the 1800s.

Most of the communities residing in Medziphema have their own churches which forms the fundamental structure of the society along with the Hohos (the Unions).

== Economy ==
=== Agriculture ===
Medziphema is also known for its pineapples. There are several villages around this town that cultivate pineapples at a large scale; some are even called as pineapple villages for their mass cultivation. In peak seasons one can find a lot of sells on the road sides of the highway at very low prices.

== Education ==
The School of Agricultural Sciences and Rural Development (SASRD), Nagaland University, Medziphema campus where is the hall mark of this small town. Added to this a new Central Institute of Horticulture (CIH) is coming up which will become fully functional soon. There are several small training centers like Veterinary training center, CTC, IECTC, etc. to boost human resources developments. There are also talks of an engineering college and a Veterinary college coming up in this town in the near future.
