= Dimapur district =

- District of Nagaland
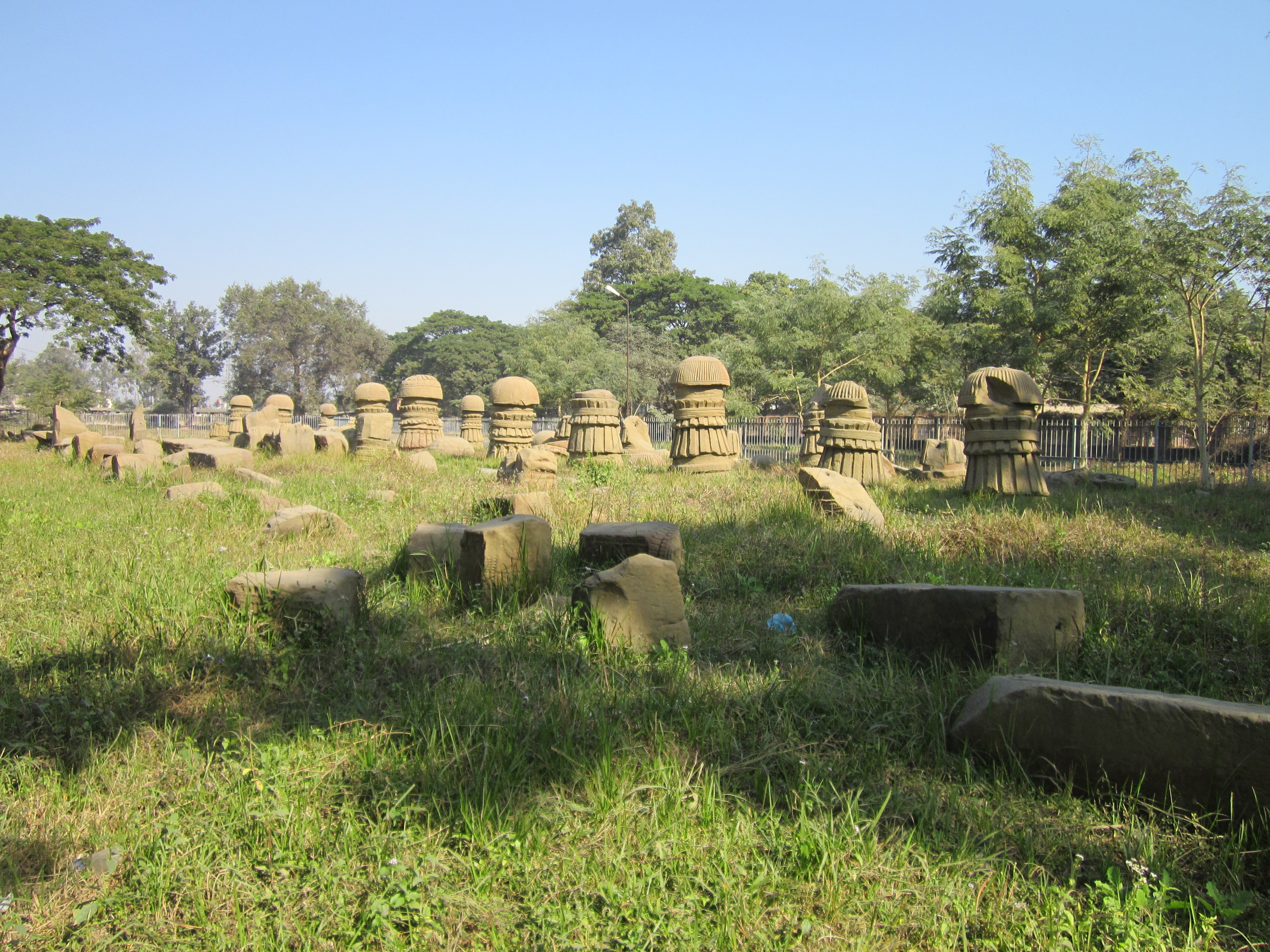
- Ruins of Kachari Rajbari in Dimapur
- Nickname: Commercial District
- Dimapur District in Nagaland
- Interactive map of Dimapur district
- Coordinates: 25.9055°N 93.7315°E
- Country: India
- State: Nagaland
- Seat: Dimapur

Government
  - Deputy Commissioner: Rajesh Soundararajan, IAS
  - Assembly constituencies: 3 constituencies

Area
  - Total: 70 km^{2} (27 sq mi)
- Elevation: 260 m (850 ft)

Population (2011)
  - Total: 170,000
  - Density: 2,400/km^{2} (6,300/sq mi)
- Time zone: UTC+05:30 (IST)
- PIN: 797112, 797113, 797116
- ISO 3166 code: IN-NL-DI
- Major highways: AH1; AH2; NH 29; NH 129; NH 129A
- Website: dimapur.nic.in

Dimapur district (/ˌdɪməˈpʊər/) is a district of Nagaland state in India. With an area of about 70 km^{2} (27 sq mi), it is the smallest district in the state of Nagaland. The district headquarters is Dimapur.

== History ==
=== Assam lease Dimapur to Nagaland ===
In 1918, Dimapur was leased to then Naga Hills District (Now Nagaland) by then erstwhile Assam Province of British India for 30 years for construction of Railways lines (unclear from which district). In 1963, It was again leased to the present state of Nagaland for 99 years. Now it is an inalienable part of the State of Nagaland.

On 18 December 2021, two new districts were carved out of Dimapur District namely Chümoukedima District and Niuland District and which became the 14th and 15th district of Nagaland respectively. The present district primarily consists of the DMC administered area and a few extended colonies contiguous to the traditional boundary of the erstwhile Town Committee area. In all practicality, the Dimapur-Chumukedima stretch of the Highway and adjacent areas is one continuous sprawl that have all attained urban features, and together qualify to be an urban agglomeration (UA). There is a felt need for joint planning and infrastructural development for a future metropolitan area.

== Administration ==
=== Divisions ===
- Ao Yimküm
- Aoyimti
- Bamunpukhuri
- Darogajan
- Dimapur Municipality
- Duncan Bosti
- Ekranipathar
- Eralibill
- Indisen
- Industrial Village Razhüphe (IVR)
- Khusiabill
- Kuda
- Lengrijan
- Naharbari
- Nuton Bosti
- Padumpukhuri
- Phaipijang
- Phevima
- Purana Bazar
- Rilan
- Samaguri
- Sangtamtilla
- Senjüm
- Shozukhü
- Signal Angami
- Thahekhü
- Toluvi
- Zani

== Demographics ==
According to the 2011 census, Dimapur district has a population of 170,000, Its population growth rate over the decade 2001–2011 was 0%. Dimapur has a sex ratio of 916 females for every 1000 males, and a literacy rate of 85.44%.

=== Religion ===
Religion in Dimapur district (2011)
1. Christianity (61.8%)
2. Hinduism (28.8%)
3. Islam (8.24%)
4. Jainism (0.57%)
5. Buddhism (0.34%)
6. Sikhism (0.15%)
7. Other (0.04%)
8. Not stated (0.08%)

According to the 2011 official census, Christianity is major religion in Dimapur district, with 2,34,239 Christians (61.84%); 1,08,900 Hindus (28.75%); 31,212 Muslims (8.24%); 2,148 Jains (0.57%); 1,270 Buddhists (0.34%); 567 Sikhs (0.15%), 157 others (0.04%) and 319 not stated (0.08%).

== Education ==
The district has ample number of institutions devoted for providing quality education to the residents. Most schools have English as their medium of instruction and are affiliated to the Nagaland Board of School Education.

== Sports ==
Dimapur is also home to Dimapur United a soccer club which plays in Nagaland Premier League. Most schools in Dimapur held friendly football matches and tournaments. Apart from football, many other games are also played in the district. Cricket, Badminton, Wrestling and Angling are other sports played in Dimapur.
