= Nagaland University =

Public university in Nagaland, India

- Motto: Labor et Honor (Latin)
- Motto in English: By Labour and Honour
- Type: Public central university
- Established: 6 September 1994; 31 years ago
- Affiliations: UGC; NAAC; AIU
- Chancellor: Dr. Samudra Gupta Kashyap
- Vice-Chancellor: Jagadish K. Patnaik
- Rector: Governor of Nagaland
- Visitor: President of India
- Faculty: 198
- Students: 2,650
- Undergraduates: 550
- Postgraduates: 1,559
- Doctoral students: 541
- Location: Lumami, Zünheboto District, Nagaland, India; 25°43′29″N 94°05′44″E
- Campus: Rural
- Website: nagalanduniversity.ac.in

Nagaland University is a Central University established in the state of Nagaland by an Act of Parliament by the Government of India in 1989. It is headquartered at Lumami, Zünheboto District. Two other permanent campuses are located at Meriema (near Kohima) and Medziphema. Altogether 70 colleges are affiliated to the university with a total student population of around 24,000. Different courses in 43 disciplines are offered at University and college levels in M.A, M.Sc, M.Com, MBA, M.Ed, M.Sc (Agri.), B.Tech, B.Sc (Agri.), LL.B, B.Ed, B.Sc, B.A, B.Com, BBA, BCA, B.Sc (Nursing) and B.Voc.

== Organisation and administration ==
=== School of Management Studies ===
The university offers MBA degree and the Department of Management is known as the School of Management Studies is situated at the kohima, Nagaland (Nu kohima campus). The Department of Management Studies under the School of Management Studies was inaugurated on 29 October 2007, and the first batch of MBA students was admitted in 2008.

The Master of Business Administration (MBA) is a two-year (4 semesters) full-time programme and is approved by the AICTE. The School of Management Studies organizes annual Management festival which is known as ZOOMMAX.

Admission for MBA Programme is done on the basis of MAT conducted by AIMA since its inception of the department which is a national level entrance test.

=== School of Engineering and Technology ===
Nagaland University's School of Engineering & Technology was established in 2007. The School of Engineering Technology(SET) has been shifted to Meriema Campus, Kohima as per the university authority's decision.

It is the first School of Engineering in the State of Nagaland and has state-of-the-art infrastructure. The academic complex is located at D.C. Court Junction, Dimapur, Nagaland.

The School currently offers 4 years (8 semesters) undergraduate (B.Tech.) programs, approved by AICTE/University, in 5 different streams:

- Agricultural Engineering & Technology
- Biotechnology
- Computer Science & Engineering
- Electronics & Communication Engineering
- Information Technology

The school adopts a teaching pattern of course credit system in semesters. Major emphasis is laid on practical & industrial training.

== Student life ==
=== Student bodies ===
There are four Student bodies under Nagaland University viz. Nagaland University Students' Union, Lumami Campus Hqrs, Post Graduate Students Union (PGSU) Meriema Campus, Post Graduate Students' Union, SMS and School of Engineering and Technology Students' Union (SETSU). However, it is likely that the PGSU, SMS and SETSU will be merged with PGSU, Meriema Campus.

The students body elections are conducted each year. Students activity includes Freshers Day, Parting Social, sports week, cultural activities, literary weeks, musical nights, carnivals, debates etc., NUSU(L) also actively takes up students issues as well as those related to Nagaland University as a whole. NUSU(L) conduct general body meetings twice a year. Lumami Campus have seen changes from NUSU(L) through dustbin initiatives, sign boards, footpath construction, regular campus cleanliness drive, etc. with active support from NU administration.

=== Cultural festivals ===
The School of engineering and technology organizes annual Management festival which is known as TECH AURA. The third edition of the Nagaland University Festival (NU FEST) was held from 4–6 May 2016 hosted by the Nagaland University Students' Union, Lumami Campus.
