= Chümoukedima =

Chümoukedima Samaguting
- City and municipality
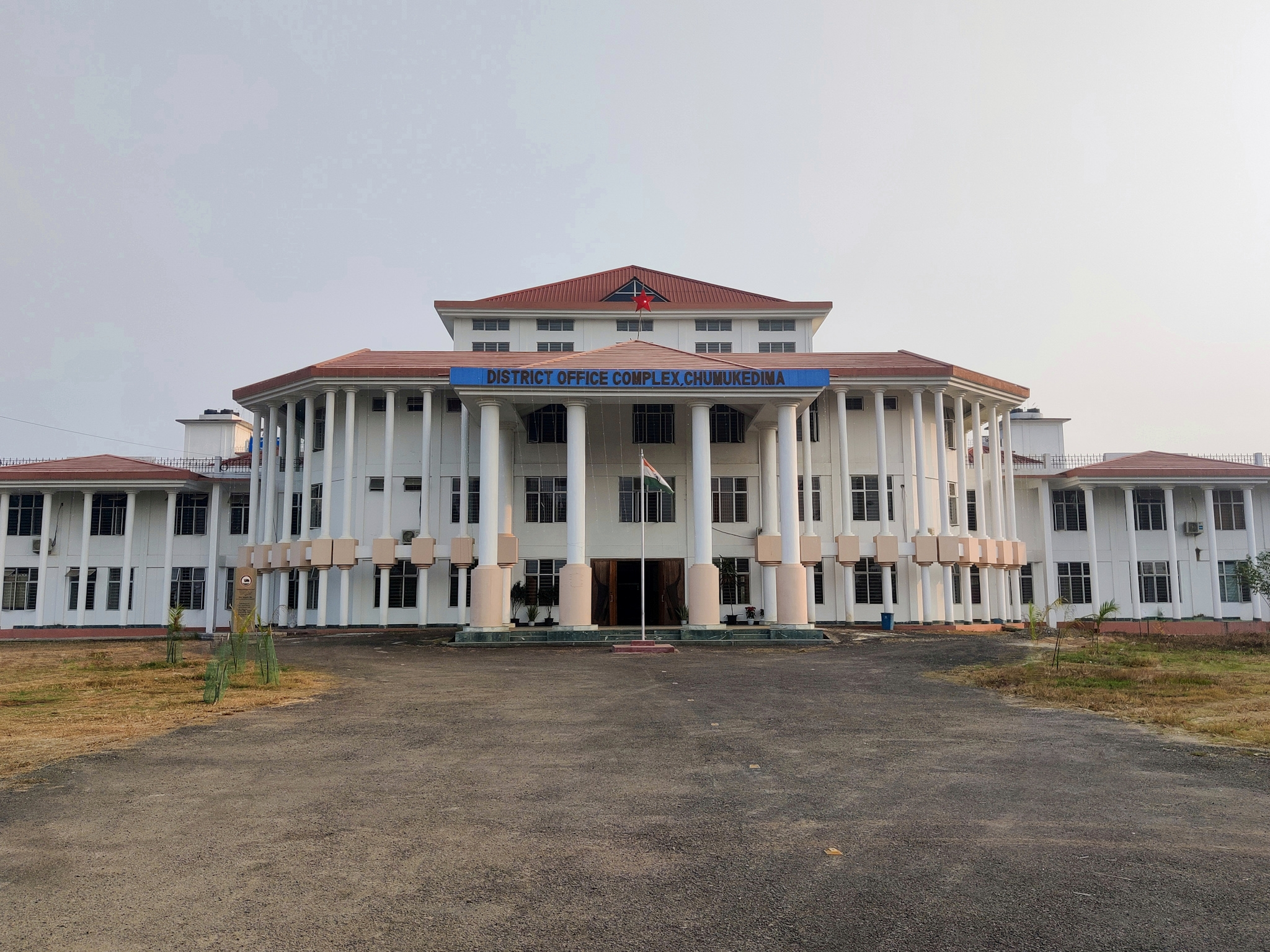
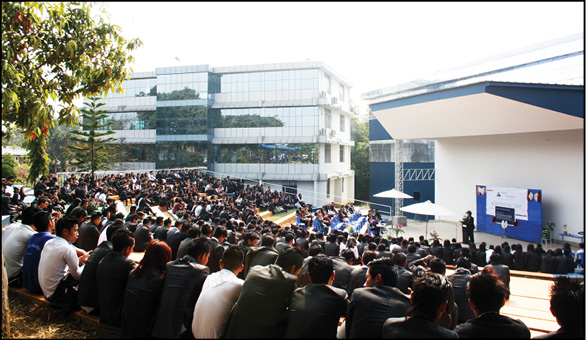
- From Top: Chümoukedima DC Office Complex; Tetso College
- Nickname: Land of Opportunities
- Interactive map of Chümoukedima
- Location in Nagaland, India Chümoukedima (India) Chümoukedima (Asia) Chümoukedima (Earth)
- Coordinates: 25°48′23.041″N 93°46′43.016″E
- Country: India
- Region: Northeast India
- State: Nagaland
- District: Chümoukedima
- Wards: 11

Government
  - Type: Municipality
  - Body: Chümoukedima Town Council
  - Chairperson: Lhousito Khro (Naga People's Front)
  - Deputy Chairperson: Moala Ao (Naga People's Front)
- Elevation: 190 m (620 ft)

Population (2011)
  - Total: 43,516

Languages
  - Official: English
  - Major languages: Angami; Ao; Chakhesang; Lotha; Nagamese; Sümi
- Time zone: UTC+5:30 (IST)
- PIN: 797103
- Vehicle registration: NL-07
- Website: chumoukedima.nic.in

Chümoukedima (/ˈtʃmʊkɛdimə/), previously spelled Chumukedima, formerly known as Samaguting, is a municipality in the Chümoukedima District of the Indian state of Nagaland. It is situated on the left bank of the Chathe and with its surrounding area that includes several other towns and villages, the Chümoukedima Metropolitan Area is the largest urban agglomeration in Nagaland in terms of area and third largest in terms of population, after Dimapur and Kohima.

Chümoukedima is the only municipality of the district of the same name. Chümoukedima was designated as the first headquarters of then Naga Hills District of Assam Province, British India, from 1866 until the administrative office moved to Wokha in 1875 and then to Kohima in 1879.

== Names ==
During the colonial era, Chümoukedima was mispronounced as "Samaguting" by British officials. This was later corrected in the book, My Experiences in Manipur and the Naga Hills (1896) by James Johnstone, who acknowledged that the proper name was Chumookodima.

In a public notice issued on 1 November 2017, the Chümoukedima Village Council stated that the name "Chümoukedima" had been incorrectly pronounced, spelled and recorded over time as "Chumukedima". To restore the original name, the council officially declared that henceforth it would be known and identified as "Chümoukedima" in all official and informal contexts.

== History ==
Chümoukedima has a historical background rooted in the interactions between the indigenous Nagas and the Dimasas. The region has been a focal point of trade, conflict and cultural exchange for centuries.

=== Early encounters and Ahom influence ===
Angami folklore

According to folklore, an Angami warrior named Thezhü-u from Kiruphema alongwith 30 warriors from Chümoukedima allied with the Dimasas, aiding them in establishing their kingdom in Dimapur after taking the consent from Chümoukedima people. Thezhü-u and his warriors lived amongst the Dimasa people for a considerable period and Thezhü-u later married the daughter of the Dimasa Raja (King). Thezhü-u and his warriors later returned to their native villages, and shortly after, the Dimasa kingdom fell to the Ahoms. (Note: It may be noted that the Dimasa remnants have sculptures of traditional Angami Spear and Daos and the Dimapur Gate was even referred to as "Thezhü-u Kharu" (Thezhü-u Gate) by the Angamis.)

Following conflicts between the Ahoms and the Dimasa kingdom, the Dimasa Raja and his followers migrated to the Medziphema and Rüzaphema valleys before settling in the Chümoukedima peaks at Tsiedukhru. Remnants of this settlement, such as whetstones and pottery, continue to be found in the region.

=== Colonial era ===
During the British era from 1866 to 1875, Chümoukedima served as the first headquarters of the then Naga Hills District of Assam Province, when it was known as Samaguting, and coming to prominence during the 1944 Japanese offensive into Manipur and the Naga Hills during the South-East Asian theatre of World War II.

=== Contemporary era ===
On 2 December 1997, the Government of Nagaland declared the erstwhile-Dimapur Sub-Division of Kohima District as a full-fledged District with Chümoukedima as its district headquarter. Construction of a new Deputy Commissioner's Office Complex at Chümoukedima soon began with the old Additional Deputy Commissioner's Office Complex at Dimapur continuing to temporarily serve the new district but over the years there were stiff oppositions from various Dimapur-based Civil Society Organizations to shift the district headquarters to Chümoukedima. On 18 December 2021, the Government of Nagaland in response split the Dimapur District into three separate districts—Chümoukedima, the existing Dimapur and Niuland.

== Geography ==
Chümoukedima is situated in the foothills of the Naga Hills rising above the city from the south. The main city centre is located on the left bank of the Chathe.

The Tourist Village at the top of the southern hills projects a bird's eye view of the whole of Chümoukedima District, Dimapur District and other parts of Karbi Anglong District of Assam. Waterfalls are also located in this area.

=== Climate ===
Chümoukedima experiences a humid subtropical climate with distinct seasonal variations. Summers are typically hot and humid, while winters are mild. The monsoon season brings heavy rainfall to the region.

Chümoukedima

Climate chart (precipitation, max. and min. temperature)
J	F	M	A	M	J	J	A	S	O	N	D
31 25 7	34 28 9	95 32 13	244 33 16	432 34 19	670 33 23	757 32 24	621 33 22	516 32 20	337 31 16	50 28 11	29 25 9
- █ Average max. and min. temperatures in °C
- █ Precipitation totals in mm
- Source: Weather and Climate
Imperial conversion
J	F	M	A	M	J	J	A	S	O	N	D
1.2 76 44	1.4 83 48	3.7 89 55	9.6 92 61	17 93 66	26 92 73	30 90 75	24 92 72	20 90 68	13 88 60	2 82 52	1.1 77 48
- █ Average max. and min. temperatures in °F
- █ Precipitation totals in inches

== Wards ==
The city has 11 administrative wards:

- Chaara Ward
- Chatherü-I Ward
- Chatherü-II Ward
- Chühotsa Ward
- Dzüde-I Ward
- Dzüde-II Ward
- Khadeirü Ward
- Pheluo Ward
- Phetso Ward
- Radeitsa Ward
- Seiurüzha Ward

== Demographics ==
As of 2011 India census, Chümoukedima had a population of 43,516.

== Economy ==
Chümoukedima is one of the fastest-growing urban centres in Nagaland. In fact, it forms part of the Chümoukedima–Dimapur urban area, which is the largest and the fastest-growing urban hub of Nagaland. The town's population has grown by nearly five times in the last two decades.

== Culture ==
=== Parks ===
Appu Park is a park located inside Chümoukedima Police Complex. The Nagaland Zoological Park, Green Park, Aqua Mellow Park, Agri Expo site, Niathu Resort and Noune Resort are all located in the Chümoukedima Metropolitan Area.

=== Media ===
Chümoukedima is home to Nagaland's first satellite television network: Hornbill TV.

== Sports ==
Football is a popular sports in the city. The 2025 Nagaland Super League was held mainly at the Chümoukedima Football Stadium. The stadium is located inside the Chümoukedima Police Complex. The city is also home to Nagaland United SC, which plays in the Nagaland Super League.

Chümoukedima co-hosted the 3rd edition of the North East Games in 2024.

== Transportation ==
=== Air ===
Chümoukedima is served by the Dimapur Airport located 7 kilometres (4.3 miles) north from the city centre.

=== Road ===
==== Highways passing through Chümoukedima ====
- Asian Highway 1 : Tokyo – Chümoukedima – Istanbul
- Asian Highway 2 : Denpasar – Chümoukedima - Khosravi
- NH 29 : Dabaka (Assam) – Chümoukedima – Jessami (Manipur)

=== Rail ===
Chümoukedima is connected with the Chümoukedima Shokhüvi Railway Station located 10 kilometres (6.2 miles) south-west from the city center. The Dimapur Railway Station is located 12 kilometres (7.5 miles) north from Chümoukedima.

== Education ==
=== Universities and Colleges ===
- ICFAI University
- St. Joseph University
- Mount Mary College
- National Institute of Technology, Nagaland
- Patkai Christian College
- Tetso College
- North East Institute of Social sciences & Research
- Norman Putsure College
- College of Nursing CIHSR
- C-Edge College
- J.N. Aier College
- Oriental Theological Seminary
- National Research Centre on Mithun

=== Schools ===
- North Town Higher Secondary School
- St. Joseph Higher Secondary School
- DMI St. Joseph Global School
- Charis High Academy
- Godwin Higher Secondary School
- Mount Mary Higher Secondary School

== Notable residents ==
=== Politics ===
- S. C. Jamir, Politician
- Salhoutuonuo Kruse, Politician
- Neiphiu Rio, Politician
- Zhaleo Rio, Politician

=== Sport ===
- Chekrovolü Swüro, Sportsperson

=== Others ===
- Melhite Kenye, Pastor and Agriculturist

== See also ==
- Dimapur
