= Index of Nagaland-related articles =

The following is a list of articles relating to the Indian state of Nagaland, sorted in alphabetical order.

== Quick index ==
A B C D E F G H I J K L M N O P R S T U V W Y Z

== 0–9 ==
=== 13 ===
- 13th Nagaland Assembly
- 14th Nagaland Assembly

=== 19 ===
- 1964 Nagaland Legislative Assembly election
- 1969 Nagaland Legislative Assembly election
- 1974 Nagaland Legislative Assembly election
- 1977 Nagaland Legislative Assembly election
- 1982 Nagaland Legislative Assembly election
- 1986 Killings of Kekuojalie Sachü and Vikhozo Yhoshü
- 1987 Nagaland Legislative Assembly election
- 1989 Nagaland Legislative Assembly election
- 1993 Nagaland Legislative Assembly election
- 1994 Mokokchung Massacre
- 1995 Kohima massacre
- 1996 Dimapur car bombing
- 1998 Nagaland Legislative Assembly election

=== 20 ===
- 2003 Nagaland Legislative Assembly election
- 2004 Dimapur bombings
- 2008 Nagaland Legislative Assembly election
- 2013 Nagaland Legislative Assembly election
- 2018 Nagaland Legislative Assembly election
- 2017 Nagaland Olympic Games
- 2017 Nagaland protests
- 2021 MG Music Awards
- 2021 Nagaland killings
- 2022 MG Music Awards
- 2022 Nagaland Olympic & Paralympic Games
- 2023 Kohima fire
- 2023 Nagaland Legislative Assembly election

== A ==
=== Ab ===
- Abdon Mech
- Aboi Assembly constituency
- Abraham Lotha

=== Ag ===
- Aghunato
- Aghunato Assembly constituency
- Agri Farm Ward

=== Ah ===
- Ahthibung

=== Ai ===
- AIR FM Tragopan

=== Al ===
- Alder College
- All India Institute of Medical Sciences, Nagaki
- Alobo Naga

=== Ak ===
- Akhuni
- Aki Kiti
- Akuluto
- Akuluto Assembly constituency

=== Al ===
- Alichen
- Alongtaki Assembly constituency

=== An ===
- Andrea Kevichüsa
- Angami Baptist Church Council
- Angami language
- Angami Naga
- Angami name
- Angami–Pochuri languages
- Angami Public Organization
- Angami Women Organization
- Angami Zapu Phizo
- Angetyongpang Assembly constituency

=== Ao ===
- Ao language
- Ao languages
- Ao Naga
- Aoleang
- Aonglenden Assembly constituency
- Aoyim

=== Ar ===
- Arkakong Assembly constituency

=== At ===
- Atoizü Assembly constituency

== B ==
=== Ba ===
- Bade, Chümoukedima District
- Baptist College, Kohima
- Battle of Kohima
- Battle of the Tennis Court
- Bayavü Hill Ward

=== Be ===
- Beisumpuikam

=== Bh ===
- Bhandari Assembly constituency

== C ==
=== Ca ===
- Capi (Newspaper)
- Capital College of Higher Education

=== Ch ===
- Chalie Kevichüsa
- Chakhesang Naga
- Chang language
- Chang Naga
- Changtongya
- Chathe
- Chathe Valley
- Chekiye
- Chekrovolü Swüro
- Chiephobozou
- Chingwang Konyak
- Chirr language
- Chishi
- Chizami Assembly constituency
- Chokri language
- Chotisüh Sazo
- Chozuba
- Chozuba Assembly constituency
- Christian Institute of Health Sciences and Research
- Christianity in Nagaland
- Chubatoshi Apok Jamir
- Chuchuyimlang
- Chümoukedima
- Chümoukedima district
- Chümoukedima Metropolitan Area
- Chungli Ao language

=== Cm ===
- C. M. Chang

=== Co ===
- COVID-19 pandemic in Nagaland

== D ==
=== Da ===
- Daklane Ward
- Dainty Buds School

=== Db ===
- D. Block Ward

=== De ===
- Democratic Alliance of Nagaland

=== Dh ===
- Dhansiri–Zubza line

=== Di ===
- Diezephe
- Dimapur
- Dimapur Airport
- Dimapur district
- Dimapur Government College
- Dimapur I Assembly constituency
- Dimapur II Assembly constituency
- Dimapur III Assembly constituency
- Dimapur–Kohima Expressway
- Dimapur railway station

=== Do ===
- Dobashi
- Dolly Kikon
- Doyang
- Doyang Hydro Electric Project

=== Dr ===
- Dreams & Chaos
- Dreams & Chaos (book)

=== Dz ===
- Dzüko Valley
- Dzüleke
- Dzülhami
- Dzüvürü Ward

== E ==
=== Ea ===
- Easterine Kire
- Eastern Christian College, Dimapur
- Eastern Mirror

=== El ===
- Elections in Nagaland
- Electrical Ward

=== Em ===
- Emblem of Nagaland

=== En ===
- Englan

=== Et ===
- Ethnic conflict in Nagaland

== F ==
=== Fa ===
- Fazl Ali College

=== Fe ===
- Feast of Merit

=== Fi ===
- Fifth Rio ministry

=== Fl ===
- Flag of Nagaland

=== Fo ===
- Forest Ward, Kohima
- Fourth Rio ministry

== G ==
=== Ga ===
- Galho
- Gaan-Ngai

=== Gh ===
- Ghaspani I Assembly constituency
- Ghaspani II Assembly constituency

=== Gk ===
- G. Kaito Aye

=== Go ===
- God Bless Nagaland
- Government of Nagaland

=== Gr ===
- G. Rio School

== H ==
=== He ===
- Hekani Jakhalu Kense

=== Hi ===
- History of Kohima
- History of the Nagas

=== Hk ===
- H. K. Sema

=== Ho ===
- Hokaito Zhimomi
- Hokishe Sema
- Hornbill Festival
- Hornbill TV
- Hovithal Sothu

== I ==
=== Ic ===
- ICFAI University, Nagaland

=== Im ===
- Imchalemba
- Immanuel Higher Secondary School, Zunheboto
- Imnainla Jamir
- Impur
- Impur Assembly constituency
- Imtikümzük Longkümer
- Imtilemba Sangtam

=== In ===
- Index of Kohima-related articles
- Index of Viswema-related articles
- Indira Gandhi Stadium, Kohima

=== Is ===
- Isak Chishi Swu

== J ==
=== Ja ===
- Jail Ward
- Jain Temple Kohima
- Jakhama
- James Kithan
- Jamir (surname)
- Jangpetkong Assembly constituency
- Japfü Christian College

=== Ji ===
- Jina and Etiben

=== Jo ===
- John Bosco Jasokie
- John Government Higher Secondary School
- Jotsoma

== K ==
=== Ka ===
- Kapamüdzü
- K. Asungba Sangtam

=== Ke ===
- Kenuozou Hill Ward
- Kevichüsa Angami
- Kewhira Dielie
- Kezol–tsa Forest

=== Kh ===
- Khaibung
- Khezhakeno
- Khiamniungan language
- Khiamniungan people
- Khodao Yanthan
- Khonoma
- Khonoma Nature Conservation and Tragopan Sanctuary
- Khuochiezie
- Khuzama
- Khriehu Liezietsu
- Khrielie-ü Kire
- Khriezephe
- Khwetelhi Thopi

=== Ki ===
- Kikon
- Kigwema
- Kihoto Hollohon
- Kiphire
- Kiphire district
- Kire (surname)
- Kirha
- Kisama Heritage Village
- Kitsübozou Ward
- Kiyaneilie Peseyie

=== Kl ===
- K. L. Chishi

=== Ko ===
- Kohima
- Kohima (disambiguation)
- Kohima Ao Baptist Church
- Kohima Botanical Garden
- Kohima Capital Cultural Center
- Kohima Chiethu Airport
- Kohima district
- Kohima Komets
- Kohima Lotha Baptist Church
- Kohima Mizo Presbyterian Church
- Kohima Municipal Council
- Kohima North Police Station
- Kohima Science College
- Kohima Stone Inscription
- Kohima Town Assembly constituency
- Kohima Village
- Kohima War Cemetery
- Kohima Zubza Railway Station
- Konyak language
- Konyak languages
- Konyak Naga
- Koridang Assembly constituency
- Koso (Angami surname)

=== Kr ===
- Kropol Vitsu
- KROS College, Kohima

=== Ku ===
- Kuda Village
- Kuzhami language

== L ==
=== La ===
- Lake Shilloi
- Lakhüti
- Langpangkong Range

=== Le ===
- Lerie Ward

=== Lh ===
- Lhüthiprü Vasa

=== Li ===
- Liangmei Naga
- Liezietsu
- Liezietsu ministry
- List of airports in Nagaland
- List of chief ministers of Nagaland
- List of deputy chief ministers of Nagaland
- List of districts of Nagaland
- List of governors of Nagaland
- List of higher education and academic institutions in Kohima
- List of hospitals in Nagaland
- List of institutions of higher education in Nagaland
- List of massacres in Nagaland
- List of Monuments of National Importance in Nagaland
- List of mountains in Nagaland
- List of Naga people
- List of Naga politicians
- List of newspapers in Nagaland
- List of people of Angami descent
- List of railway stations in Nagaland
- List of Rajya Sabha members from Nagaland
- List of rivers in Nagaland
- List of schools in Nagaland
- List of traditional Naga festivals
- List of traditional Naga games and sports
- List of villages in Nagaland

=== Lk ===
- L. Kijungluba Ao

=== Lo ===
- Local government in Nagaland
- Longkhim–Chare Assembly constituency
- Longkümer
- Longleng
- Longleng district
- Longleng Assembly constituency
- Longri Ao
- Lotha language
- Lotha Naga
- Lower Mediezie Ward
- Lower Chandmari Ward
- Lower Police Reserve Hill Ward
- Lower PWD Ward

=== Lu ===
- Lumami

== M ==
=== Ma ===
- Macnivil
- Mary Help of Christians Cathedral, Kohima
- Matikhrü
- Matikhrü Massacre
- Mayangnokcha Ao

=== Me ===
- Medziphema
- Melhite Kenye
- Meluri Assembly constituency
- Mengujüma
- Merhülietsa Ward
- Methaneilie Solo
- Metsübo Jamir
- Mezhür Higher Secondary School
- Mezoma

=== Mg ===
- MG Music Awards

=== Mi ===
- Middle PWD Ward
- Midland Ward
- Ministers' Hill Baptist Higher Secondary School
- Miss Nagaland

=== Mm ===
- Mmhonlümo Kikon

=== Mo ===
- Moatsü
- Model Christian College, Kohima
- Moka Assembly constituency
- Mokokchung
- Mokokchung district
- Mokokchung Town Assembly constituency
- Mokokchung Village
- Moko Koza
- Molvom
- Molvom Railway Station
- Monalisa Changkija
- Mon district
- Mongoya Assembly constituency
- Mongsen Ao language
- Mon Town
- Mon Town Assembly constituency
- Mopungchuket
- Mount Mary College, Chümoukedima
- Mount Japfü
- Mount Saramati

=== Mu ===
- Mungmung
- Municipal Wards of Kohima
- Murder of Vihozhonü Zao
- Mürise
- Music Awards of Nagaland
- Music of Nagaland

== N ==
=== Na ===
- Naga Army
- Naga Bazaar Ward
- Naga cuisine
- Naga folklore
- Naga Hills District, British India
- Naga Hospital Authority
- Naga Hospital Ward
- Nagaki
- Naga Plebiscite
- Nagaki Rüzaphema International Airport
- Nagaland
- Nagaland Baptist Church Council
- Nagaland Cricket Association
- Nagaland Cricket Association Stadium
- Nagaland cricket team
- Nagaland Dobashi Association
- Nagaland football team
- Nagaland Information Commission
- Nagaland Legislative Assembly
- Nagaland Liquor Total Prohibition Act, 1989
- Nagaland Lok Adalat
- Nagaland Lokayukta
- Nagaland (Lok Sabha constituency)
- Nagaland Medical College
- Nagaland Nationalist Organisation
- Nagaland Page
- Nagaland Peace Accord
- Nagaland Police
- Nagaland Post
- Nagaland Pradesh Congress Committee
- Nagaland Premier League
- Nagaland State Election Commission
- Nagaland State Library
- Nagaland State Museum
- Nagaland University
- Nagaland women's cricket team
- Nagaland Wrestling Association
- Nagaland Zoological Park
- Naga people
- Naga People's Front
- Naga Students' Federation
- Naga United
- Naga Wrestling Championship
- Naginimora
- NAJ Cosfest
- Nana: A Tale of Us
- National Institute of Technology, Nagaland
- Nationalist Democratic Progressive Party
- National Research Centre on Mithun
- National Socialist Council of Nagaland

=== Nb ===
- N. Bongkhao Konyak

=== Ne ===
- Neiba Kronu
- Neichülie-ü Nikki Haralu
- Neidonuo Angami
- Neikezhakuo Kengurüse
- Neiliezhü Üsou
- Neiphiu Rio
- New Market Ward
- New Ministers' Hill Ward
- New Reserve Ward

=== Ni ===
- Niuland district

=== No ===
- Noklak
- Noklak district
- Noklak Assembly constituency
- Noksen Assembly constituency
- North East Zone Cultural Centre
- Northern Angami I Assembly constituency
- Northern Angami II Assembly constituency
- Northfield School, Kohima

=== Nt ===
- Ntangki National Park
- Ntenyi language

== O ==
=== Ol ===
- Old Ministers' Hill Ward

=== On ===
- Ongpangkong

=== Ou ===
- Outline of Kohima

=== Or ===
- Oriental Theological Seminary

== P ==
=== Pa ===
- Pangti
- Patkai Christian College

=== Pc ===
- Pcheda

=== Pe ===
- Peraciezie Ward
- Peren (town)
- Peren Assembly constituency
- Peren district
- Peren Government College

=== Pf ===
- Pfütsero
- Pfütsero Government College
- Pfütsero Assembly constituency

=== Ph ===
- Phangnon Konyak
- Phek
- Phek district
- Phek Assembly constituency
- Phomching Assembly constituency
- Phom language
- Phom Naga

=== Pi ===
- Piyong Temjen Jamir

=== Pk ===
- P. Kilemsungla

=== Po ===
- Pochuri language
- Pochury Naga
- Police Reserve Hill Ward
- Politics of Nagaland
- Porba

=== Pp ===
- P. Paiwang Konyak

=== Ps ===
- P. Shilu Ao

=== Pu ===
- Public College of Commerce
- Pughoboto
- Pughoboto Assembly constituency
- Pulie Badze
- Pulie Badze Wildlife Sanctuary
- Pungro Kiphire Assembly constituency

== R ==
=== Ra ===
- Raj Bhavan, Kohima
- Rano M. Shaiza
- Razhukhrielie Kevichüsa

=== Re ===
- Regional Centre of Excellence for Music & Performing Arts
- Reivilie Angami
- Rengma language
- Rengma Naga

=== Ri ===
- Rio (surname)

=== Ro ===
- Roman Catholic Diocese of Kohima
- Rongsen Jonathan

=== Ru ===
- Ruins of Kachari Rajbari
- Rüzaphema

== S ==
=== Sa ===
- Sakhrie Park
- Sakraba
- Salesian College of Higher Education
- Salhoutuonuo Kruse
- Sanctuary Falls
- Sangtam language
- Sangtam Naga
- Sanis Assembly constituency
- S. Anungla
- Satakha
- Satakha Assembly constituency

=== Se ===
- Sechü Zubza
- Sekrenyi
- Sepfüzou Ward
- Sesino Yhoshü
- Seyochung–Sitimi Assembly constituency

=== Sc ===
- S. C. Jamir

=== Sh ===
- Shalom Bible Seminary
- Shamator district
- Shamator–Chessore Assembly constituency
- Sharingain Longkümer
- Shokhüvi Railway Station
- Shikiho Sema
- Shürhozelie Liezietsu

=== Si ===
- Silas Kikon

=== So ===
- Sodzülhou
- Sopfünuo
- Southern Angami
- Southern Angami I Assembly constituency
- Southern Angami II Assembly constituency
- Southern Angami Public Organization
- Sovima

=== St ===
- St. Joseph's College, Jakhama
- St. Joseph University, Nagaland

=== Su ===
- Sümi language
- Sümi Naga
- Suruhoto Assembly constituency

=== Sw ===
- Swe–ba

== T ==
=== Ta ===
- Talimeren Ao
- Tamlu Assembly constituency
- Tapi Assembly constituency
- Tati (instrument)

=== Te ===
- Tehok Assembly constituency
- Te–l Khukhu
- Temjen Imna Along
- Temsu Clover
- Tening Assembly constituency
- Tenyiphe I
- Tenyiphe II
- Temsüla Ao
- Tetseo Sisters
- Tetso College
- Teyozwü Hill

=== Th ===
- Thenucho Tünyi
- Thegabakha Ward
- Theja Rio
- The Morung Express
- The Pangti Story
- Thepfülo-u Nakhro
- Thonoknyu Assembly constituency
- Thuthse

=== Ti ===
- Tikhir language
- Timeline of Naga history
- Tizit Assembly constituency

=== To ===
- Tobu Assembly constituency
- Tokheho Yepthomi
- Tokhü Emong
- Tongpang Ozüküm

=== Tr ===
- Trance Effect
- Trinity Theological College, Dimapur
- T. R. Zeliang

=== Ts ===
- Tseilhoutuo Rhütso
- Tseminyü
- Tseminyü district
- Tseminyü Assembly constituency
- Tsiepfü Tsiepfhe Ward
- Tsüngkotepsü

=== Tt ===
- T. Torechu

=== Tu ===
- Tubu Kevichüsa
- Tuensang
- Tuensang district
- Tuensang Sadar I Assembly constituency
- Tuensang Sadar II Assembly constituency
- Tuli, India
- Tuli Assembly constituency

=== Ty ===
- Tyüi Assembly constituency

=== Tz ===
- Tzürangkong

== U ==
=== Un ===
- Ungma
- United Democratic Alliance (Nagaland)

=== Up ===
- Upper Mediezie Ward
- Upper Chandmari Ward
- Upper PWD Ward

=== Ur ===
- Ura Mail
- Urra Village

== V ==
=== Va ===
- Vamüzo Phesao

=== Ve ===
- Venüzo Dawhuo

=== Vi ===
- Vidima
- Vikho-o Yhoshü
- Virazouma
- Viseyie Koso
- Viswema
- Viswema Hall
- Viswesül Pusa
- Vizol Koso
- Vizadel Sakhrie

== W ==
=== Wa ===
- Wakching Assembly constituency
- Wati Aier

=== We ===
- Western Angami Assembly constituency

=== Wo ===
- Wokha
- Wokha district
- Wokha Assembly constituency

== Y ==
=== Ya ===
- Yankey Patton
- Yanthungo Patton

=== Ye ===
- Yemhi Memorial College

=== Yh ===
- Yhoshü

=== Yi ===
- Yikhüm
- Yimkhiung Naga
- Yimkhiungrü language
- Yimyu

== Z ==
=== Za ===
- Zaku Zachariah Tsükrü
- Zale Neikha

=== Ze ===
- Zeme language
- Zemeic language
- Zeme Naga
- Zeliangrong

=== Zh ===
- Zhaleo Rio
- Zhokhoi Chüzho

=== Zu ===
- Zuboni Hümtsoe
- Zünheboto
- Zünheboto district
- Zünheboto Sümi Baptist Church
- Zünheboto Assembly constituency
- Zutho

== See also ==
- Outline of Nagaland
