= Index of Kohima-related articles =

The following is an incomplete list of articles related to the city of Kohima, Nagaland, sorted in alphabetical order. To learn quickly what Kohima is, see Outline of Kohima.

== Quick index ==
A B C D E F G H I J K L M N O P R S T U V W Y Z

== 0–9 ==
=== 19 ===
- 1986 Killing of Kekuojalie Sachü and Vikhozo Yhoshü
- 1995 Kohima massacre

=== 20 ===
- 2022 MG Music Awards
- 2022 Nagaland Olympic & Paralympic Games
- 2023 Kohima fire

== A ==
- Agri Farm Ward
- AIR FM Tragopan
- Alder College
- Angami Public Organization
- Angami Women Organization
- Andrea Kevichüsa

== B ==
- Baptist College, Kohima
- Battle of Kohima
- Battle of the Tennis Court
- Bayavü Hill Ward

== C ==
- Capi (newspaper)
- Chalie Kevichüsa

== D ==
- Daklane Ward
- D. Block Ward
- Dimapur–Kohima Expressway
- Dzüvürü Ward

== E ==
- Electrical Ward

== F ==
- Forest Ward, Kohima

== H ==
- Hekani Jakhalu Kense

=== Hi ===
- History of Kohima

=== Ho ===
- Hornbill Festival
- Hovithal Sothu

== I ==
- Imnainla Jamir
- Indira Gandhi Stadium, Kohima

== J ==
- Jail Ward
- Jain Temple Kohima

== K ==
=== Ke ===
- Kenuozou Hill Ward
- Kewhira Dielie
- Keziekie Ward

=== Kh ===
- Khriehu Liezietsu
- Khrielie-ü Kire
- Khuochiezie

=== Ki ===
- Kitsübozou Ward

=== Ko ===
- Kohima
- Kohima Ao Baptist Church
- Kohima Botanical Garden
- Kohima Camp
- Kohima Capital Cultural Center
- Kohima Chiethu Airport
- Kohima (disambiguation)
- Kohima district
- Kohima Komets
- Kohima Lotha Baptist Church
- Kohima Mizo Presbyterian Church
- Kohima Municipal Council
- Kohima North Police Station
- Kohima Science College
- Kohima Stone Inscription
- Kohima Town (Vidhan Sabha constituency)
- Kohima Village
- Kohima War Cemetery
- Kohima Zubza Railway Station

=== Kr ===
- KROS College, Kohima

== L ==
- Lerie Ward
- Lhüthiprü Vasa
- List of higher education and academic institutions in Kohima
- List of religious buildings in Kohima
- Lower Mediezie Ward
- Lower Chandmari Ward
- Lower Police Reserve Hill Ward
- Lower PWD Ward

== M ==
- Macnivil
- Mary Help of Christians Cathedral, Kohima
- Merhülietsa Ward
- Methaneilie Solo
- Mezhür Higher Secondary School
- Middle PWD Ward
- Midland Ward
- Ministers' Hill Baptist Higher Secondary School
- Miss Nagaland
- Model Christian College, Kohima
- Municipal Wards of Kohima
- Murder of Vihozhonü Zao

== N ==
- Naga Bazaar Ward
- Naga Hospital Authority
- Naga Hospital Ward
- Nagaland Medical College
- Nagaland State Library
- Nagaland State Museum
- Nagaland Wrestling Association
- Naga Wrestling Championship
- NAJ Cosfest
- Neidonuo Angami
- Neiliezhü Üsou
- New Market Ward
- New Ministers' Hill Ward
- New Reserve Ward

== O ==
- Old Ministers' Hill Ward

== P ==
- Peraciezie Ward
- Police Reserve Hill Ward
- Pulie Badze
- Pulie Badze Wildlife Sanctuary

== R ==
- Raj Bhavan, Kohima
- Razhukhrielie Kevichüsa
- Regional Centre of Excellence for Music & Performing Arts
- Roman Catholic Diocese of Kohima

== S ==
- Sakhrie Park
- Salhoutuonuo Kruse
- Sepfüzou Ward
- Sesino Yhoshü
- Shürhozelie Liezietsu

== T ==
- Tetseo Sisters
- Thegabakha Ward
- Theja Rio
- Tseilhoutuo Rhütso
- Tsiepfü Tsiepfhe Ward

== U ==
- Upper Mediezie Ward
- Upper Chandmari Ward
- Upper PWD Ward

== Z ==
- Zaku Zachariah Tsükrü
- Zale Neikha
- Zapu Phizo

== See also ==
- Outline of Kohima
