= Outline of Kohima =

Overview of and topical guide to Kohima

The following outline is provided as an overview of and topical guide to Kohima:

Kohima (/koʊˈhiːmə/; Tenyidie: Kewhira (IPA: [ˈkɛʍɪɻə])) is the capital of the North East Indian state of Nagaland. With a resident population of almost 100,000, it is the second largest city in the state. Kohima constitutes both a district and a municipality. The municipality covers 20 km^{2} (7.7 sq mi). The city lies on the foothills of Japfü section of the Barail Range located south of the district () and has an average elevation of 1,261 m (4,137 ft).

Originally known as Kewhira, the city's history goes back to a time when it was a village of the Angami Nagas. It became an urban centre in 1878 when the British Empire established its headquarters of the then Naga Hills District of Assam Province. Kohima was the site of one of the bloodiest battles of World War II during the Japanese U-Go offensive into British India in 1944. The battle is often referred to as the Stalingrad of the East. In 2013, the British National Army Museum voted the Battle of Kohima to be Britain's Greatest Battle.

It officially became Nagaland's capital after the state was inaugurated in 1963. (See: main article.)

== General reference ==
- Common English name(s): Kohima
- Official English name(s): City of Kohima

== Geography of Kohima ==
Geography of Kohima

- Kohima is: a city
- Population of Kohima:
- Area of Kohima:
- Atlas of Kohima

=== Location of Kohima ===
- Kohima is situated within the following regions:
  - Northern Hemisphere
  - Eastern Hemisphere
    - Eurasia
      - Asia
        - South Asia
          - India
            - Northeast India
              - Nagaland
                - Kohima District
- Time zone(s): Indian Standard Time (UTC+5:30)

=== Environment of Kohima ===
- Climate of Kohima

=== Landforms of Kohima ===
- Pulie Badze

=== Areas of Kohima ===
==== Wards of Kohima ====
Municipal Wards of Kohima

The specific wards are listed below.

1. Agri Farm Ward
2. Bayavü Hill Ward
3. Daklane Ward
4. D. Block Ward
5. Dzüvürü Ward
6. Electrical Ward
7. Forest Ward
8. Jail Ward
9. Kenuozou Hill Ward
10. Keziekie Ward
11. Kitsübozou Ward
12. Lerie Ward
13. Lower Mediezie Ward
14. Lower Chandmari Ward
15. Lower Police Reserve Hill Ward
16. Lower PWD Ward
17. Merhülietsa Ward
18. Middle PWD Ward
19. Midland Ward
20. Naga Bazaar Ward
21. Naga Hospital Ward
22. New Market Ward
23. New Ministers' Hill Ward
24. New Reserve Ward
25. Old Ministers' Hill Ward
26. Peraciezie Ward
27. Police Reserve Hill Ward
28. Sepfüzou Ward
29. Thegabakha Ward
30. Tsiepfü Tsiepfhe Ward
31. Upper Mediezie Ward
32. Upper Chandmari Ward
33. Upper PWD Ward

==== Neighborhoods in Kohima ====
- Neighborhoods in Kohima

=== Locations in Kohima ===
==== Parks and zoos in Kohima ====
- Sakhrie Park

==== Historic locations in Kohima ====
- Kohima War Cemetery

== Government and politics of Kohima ==
- Kohima Municipal Council

=== Nagaland government within Kohima ===
Kohima is the capital of Nagaland, and its branches of government located there are:

- Raj Bhavan, Kohima

== History of Kohima ==
History of Kohima

=== History of Kohima, by subject ===
- Battle of Kohima
- 1986 Killing of Kekuojalie Sachü and Vikhozo Yhoshü
- 1995 Kohima massacre
- 2017 Nagaland protests
- 2023 Kohima fire
- Murder of Vihozhonü Zao

== Culture in Kohima ==
Culture of Kohima

- Architecture of Kohima
  - Kohima Capital Cultural Center
  - Regional Centre of Excellence for Music & Performing Arts

=== Religion in Kohima ===
- Christianity in Kohima
  - Churches in Kohima
    - Kohima Ao Baptist Church
    - Kohima Lotha Baptist Church
    - Mary Help of Christians Cathedral, Kohima

=== Sports in Kohima ===
Sport in Kohima

- Football in Kohima
  - Kohima Komets
- Sort venues in Kohima
  - Indira Gandhi Stadium

== Economy and infrastructure of Kohima ==
- Banking in Kohima
- Commerce in Kohima
  - Markets in Kohima
- Communications in Kohima
  - Media in Kohima
    - Newspapers in Kohima
      - Capi

=== Transportation in Kohima ===
Transport in Kohima

- Air transport in Kohima
  - Kohima Chiethu Airport
- Rail transit in Kohima
  - Kohima Zubza Railway Station

== Education in Kohima ==
Education in Kohima

- Educational Institutions in Kohima
- Universities in Kohima
  - Nagaland University, Meriema Campus

== Health in Kohima ==
- Hospitals in Kohima
  - Naga Hospital Authority
  - Nagaland Medical College

== See also ==
- Nagaland
- Index of Kohima-related articles
- Outline of geography
