= Chandmari =

Chandmari or Chanmari may refer to:

- Chandmari, Guwahati, locality of Guwahati, Assam
- Chandmari, Uttarakhand, a village in the Indian state of Uttarakhand
- Chanmari FC, football club based in Aizawl Mizoram
- Lower Chandmari Ward, ward of Kohima, Nagaland
- Upper Chandmari Ward, ward of Kohima, Nagaland
