= Nagaland State Library =

State library in Nagaland state, India

Coordinates: 25.657772°N 94.098192°E

- Location: Police Reserve Hill, Kohima, Nagaland, India
- Established: 1981

Collection
- Size: 58,000

Access and use
- Population served: all citizens

Nagaland State Library is a Metropolitan Library in Kohima, Nagaland, India. It is located in Police Reserve Hill on the road leading to Jotsoma.

== History ==
Nagaland State Library was established in 1981 under the Nagaland Government's Department of Arts & Culture.

In 2016-17 the library received ₹1,75,48,000 (over ₹17 million) under the National Mission on Libraries (NML) for upgradation, subscription for e-journals and e-books, and procurement of reading resources, and other programmes. By 2019 the library had a collection of more than 58,000 books with 3796 registered members. The library had 17 people employed which was much less than the required staff and experts to manage it.

== See also ==
- List of libraries in India
