= Kohima Botanical Garden =

Indian landmark

- Interactive map of Kohima Botanical Garden
- Type: Urban park
- Location: Aradurah Hill, New Ministers' Hill Ward, Kohima, Nagaland, India
- Coordinates: 25.649353°N 94.099215°E
- Status: Open all year

Kohima Botanical Garden is a botanical garden in Kohima, Nagaland, India. It is located in the New Ministers' Hill Ward of Kohima. The garden is looked after by the Nagaland Forest Department.

In November 2024 the garden unveiled its digital tree guide for most of the trees housed. The QR code on the trees provide for interactive learning.
