= Kohima (disambiguation) =

Kohima is the capital city of the Indian state of Nagaland.

Kohima may also refer to:

== India ==
- Kohima district, a district of Nagaland, India, with the city as its capital
- Kohima Town Assembly constituency, a legislative assembly constituency of Nagaland
- Kohima Village, a village in the city
- Municipal Wards of Kohima, ward divisions of the city
- Battle of Kohima, an important battle of the Second World War

== Hong Kong ==
- Kohima Camp, a military post

== Zambia ==
- Kohima Barracks, a military post
