= Nagaland State Museum =

Museum Bayavü Hill, Kohima, Nagaland

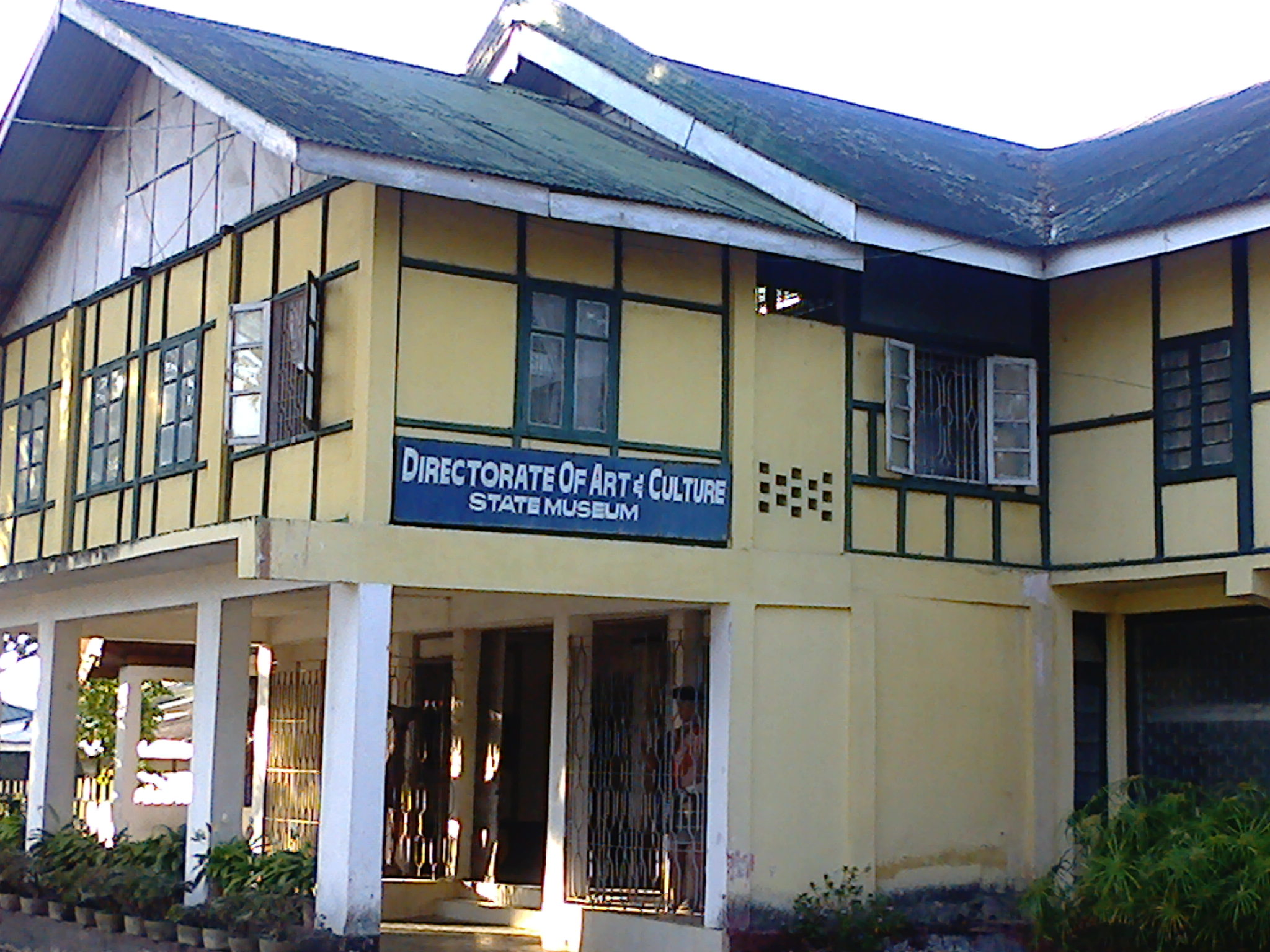
- Entrance to the museum
- Established: 25 November 1970; 55 years ago
- Location: Bayavü Hill, Kohima, Nagaland, India
- Coordinates: 25.6850°N 94.1049°E
- Visitors: 20,539 (2019)
- Director: Rongsen Pongener
- Website: artandculture.nagaland.gov.in

The Nagaland State Museum is a museum located in Bayavü Hill, Kohima, Nagaland, India. It is operated by the Department of Art and Culture, Nagaland. The museum collects, preserves and displays a comprehensive collection of artefacts including ancient sculptures, traditional dresses, inscriptions from all over Nagaland. The museum was first opened to public on 25 November 1970.

The museum is one of the two museums operated by the Directorate of Art and Culture, Nagaland.

== History ==
The Directorate of Art and Culture (formerly Naga Institute of Culture) was formed on 1 November 1964. Its main focus was to research on Naga Life and Culture and a Research Library.

In early 1970, the Nagaland State Museum building was constructed which also housed the Directorate. The museum which consisted of an ethnographic gallery was formally opened to the public on 25 November 1970.
