= Dreams & Chaos =

2020 Naga television series

- Promotional poster
- Genre: Drama
- Created by: DABA Youth Ministry
- Based on: Dreams & Chaos by Sentilong Ozüküm
- Written by: Sentilong Ozüküm
- Directed by: Bendang Walling
- Starring: Kilangtemsü Imsong; Waluniba Ajem; Limasenla Jamir
- Composer: Nokrang Longkümer
- Country of origin: India
- Original languages: Ao; Nagamese
- No. of seasons: 2
- No. of episodes: 12

Production
- Cinematography: Aakum Den
- Editor: Menang Jamir
- Running time: 18–45 minutes

Original release
- Network: YouTube
- Release: 13 November 2020 – 4 March 2022

Dreams & Chaos is a Naga web series based on writer Sentilong Ozüküm's 2020 book of the same name. The series stars Kilangtemsü Imsong alongside Waluniba Ajem and Limasenla Jamir. The first season aired on YouTube from 13 November 2020 to 25 December 2020. The second season aired between 28 January 2022 and 4 March 2022.

== Synopsis ==
After a quarrel with his policeman father which resulted in a broken windowpane, Moluti finds himself more and more estranged from his father. An attempt by his mother for reconciliation ends up in another bitter quarrel.

== Cast ==
=== Main ===
- Kilangtemsü Imsong as Moluti
- Waluniba Ajem as Senti
- Limasenla Jamir as Ali

=== Supporting ===
- Lipokümzük Pongen as Moluti's father
- Renemsongla Ozüküm as Moluti's mother
- Merang Lemtür as Vicky
- Sungjemmong Jamir as Moluti's sister
- Imtinaro as Kim

== Episodes ==
=== Season 1 ===
No.	Title	Directed by	Written by	Original release date
1	"A New Beginning"	Bendang Walling	Sentilong Ozüküm	13 November 2020
After a quarrel with his policeman father which resulted in a broken windowpane, Moluti finds himself more and more estranged from his father. An attempt by his mother for reconciliation ends up in another bitter quarrel.
2	"The Road Less Traveled"	Bendang Walling	Sentilong Ozüküm	20 November 2020
After a bitter quarrel with his parents, Moluti Jamir elopes from home and takes refuge with his friend Senti at Dimapur. Living completely at the hospitality of his old hostel roommate, he needs to urgently find a job and start earning his own daily bread. As he scans the newspaper every morning searching for job advertisements and runs around the city for job interviews, life teaches him the bitter truths of reality.
3	"Against All Odds"	Bendang Walling	Sentilong Ozüküm	27 November 2020
After several unsuccessful job interviews and with nowhere else to turn to, Moluti ends up working as a salesman in a hardware shop in Dimapur. The difficult, mundane work batters Moluti's spirit. A bitter encounter with his elder sister who accuses him of bringing disgrace to the family and the continuous struggle for daily existence leaves him battered, bruised and burnt.
4	"Heralding Hope"	Bendang Walling	Sentilong Ozüküm	11 December 2020
After working for months at the hardware store, Moluti gets another job as a cataloguing employee at an online store called Kimbo where he enjoys the work. At Kimbo, Moluti discovers his passion and purpose through his work. Within months, Moluti transforms the bankrupted online store into a profitable company and is appointed as the manager of the store.
5	"The Reunion"	Bendang Walling	Sentilong Ozüküm	18 December 2020
After a turn of events, Moluti acquires the Kimbo store after an agreement with Kim. Excited at the prospect at hand he continues to work hard at the store determined to pay off all his debts. However, he faces hurdles after hurdles, as the Govt. passes new tax regulations and Kimbo isn't able to make profit. He encounters his long-lost college best friend Ali, who is working as the Director of an NGO working with destitute women. Together they join hands to lift Kimbo out of bankruptcy.
6	"The Confession"	Bendang Walling	Sentilong Ozüküm	25 December 2020
Kimbo and Second Chances joint venture becomes a hit and Kimbo online store is lifted out of bankruptcy. Ali slowly sheds away the wall she has built around Moluti and together they strive to establish themselves as the upcoming young entrepreneurs of the state. Moluti finds himself slowly falling for after a boost of encouragement from his friend Senti, Moluti invites Ali for a date and plans to confess his feelings for him, but on the date, little does he know that a big surprise awaits him.

=== Season 2 ===
No.	Title	Directed by	Written by	Original release date
1	"Back to College Days"	Bendang Walling	Sentilong Ozüküm	28 January 2022
As Moluti walks home under the beautiful Dimapur night sky after his date with Ali, he can’t help but reminiscence about his college days in Mokokchung. Ten years ago Moluti Jamir, horribly late for his class, runs into a beautiful girl in the college hallway and he is completely smitten by her beauty. He can no longer focus on what the lecturers are teaching in the classroom and spends the day dreaming about the girl in the hallway. Later, when his college gang of Ali, Jungshi, Atsi, Aien and Vicky discusses the issues of the education system and unemployment problem in the country, Moluti is lost in the world of ‘love at first sight'. Will Moluti run into her again?
2	"Love, Friendship and Beyond"	Bendang Walling	Sentilong Ozüküm	4 February 2022
Moluti, madly in love with Esther, runs from pillar to post searching for her phone number. He confesses his feelings for Esther to his best friend Ali who is not pleased with Moluti’s sudden change in behaviour. Nurturing a secret broken heart, Ali lectures Moluti on the meaning of true love but Moluti is hell-bent on reaching out to Esther. However, things go haywire when he tries to contact Esther over the phone. Meanwhile, a new youth director is appointed at the church and the youth leaders led by Moluti’s elder sister Ayala, come together to discuss the urgent problem faced by the youths of the church – The problem of educated unemployed youths.
3	"Beyond Mess"	Bendang Walling	Sentilong Ozüküm	11 December 2022
Moluti is on top of the world after he nurtures a relationship with Esther over the phone. Meanwhile, the youth leaders of the church discuss and plan various programmes to mitigate the problem of educated unemployed youths. Moluti’s sister Aya and the youths director leaves no stones unturned to recruit youths in the ‘dignity of labour’ programme. Back at the college, the gang finally goes for a picnic at a riverside. Things, however, turns ugly at the picnic.
4	"Love Quake"	Bendang Walling	Sentilong Ozüküm	18 February 2022
Things fall apart on the day Moluti meets Esther which spirals into a series of conflicts between him and his most trusted friends, Ali and Vicky which forces him into a state of mental depression. Ali with Moluti’s sister Aya, conjures up a plan to pull Moluti out of his mental state. Will Moluti meet Esther again?
5	"True Love Waits"	Bendang Walling	Sentilong Ozüküm	25 February 2022
After Moluti runs into Esther several times despite his attempt to erase her out of his life, he is convinced that it is fate that is bringing their union together. Ali, however, tries her best to convince Moluti to stop with his folly and tells him that True Love Always Waits. Moluti however plans to get close to Esther. Will he succeed in his mission?
6	"Different Destinations"	Bendang Walling	Sentilong Ozüküm	4 March 2022
After appearing his graduation exams, Moluti lands in a state of utter confusion and chaos as he finds himself unable to plan for his future. Both Ali and Esther vanishes from his life leaving him in a state of turmoil. Meanwhile, a season of love descends into the lives of Moluti's sister and the Youth Director. What will Moluti decide for his future?

== Book ==
Dreams & Chaos is a novel by Sentilong Ozüküm. It is his second solo novel, and his third book overall. It was published on 19 October 2020. It tells the story of Moluti Jamir, in the journey of the growing pains of adulthood, of expectations unrealised, of learning how to let go and moving on, of a love lost and found and, of second chances.

== Production ==
=== Music ===
Nokrang Jamir composed the music for the web series and the theme song of the series ‘Teimla’ was composed and sung by Kümzük T. Jamir.

== Reception ==
=== Awards and nominations ===
Year	Award	Category	Recipient	Result	Ref.
2021	Kashi Indian International Film Festival	Best Web Series	Dreams & Chaos	Won	
