= Beisumpuikam =

Beisumpuikam Beisumpui
- Village
- Location Nagaland, India Beisumpuikam (India)
- Coordinates: 25.522629°N 93.680352°E
- Country: India
- State: Nagaland
- District: Peren
- Circle: Athibung
- Beisumpuikam: 08.02.1990 [date of recognition]
- Founder: Tadibe Disuang

Population (2011)
  - Total: 2,904
- Time zone: UTC+5:30 (IST)
- Census code: 268326

Beisumpuikam is a village in the Peren district of Nagaland, India. It is located in the Athibung Circle.

== Demographics ==
According to the 2011 census of India, Beisumpuikam has 494 households. The effective literacy rate (i.e. the literacy rate of population excluding children aged 6 and below) is 71.37%.

Demographics (2011 Census)
	Total	Male	Female
Population	2904	1502	1402
Children aged below 6 years	553	293	260
Scheduled caste	0	0	0
Scheduled tribe	2371	1216	1155
Literates	1678	936	742
Workers (all)	1866	974	892
Main workers (total)	842	635	207
Main workers: Cultivators	513	362	151
Main workers: Agricultural labourers	159	142	17
Main workers: Household industry workers	7	7	0
Main workers: Other	163	124	39
Marginal workers (total)	1024	339	685
Marginal workers: Cultivators	518	183	335
Marginal workers: Agricultural labourers	180	54	126
Marginal workers: Household industry workers	60	22	38
Marginal workers: Others	266	80	186
Non-workers	1038	528	510
