= Kohima Mizo Presbyterian Church =

Presbyterian church in Kohima, India

- Kohima Mizo Kohhran Biak In
- Kohima Mizo Presbyterian Church
- 25.661020°N 94.099966°E
- Location: Lower Police Reserve Hill, Kohima, Nagaland
- Country: India
- Denomination: Presbyterian

History
- Founded: 1957; 69 years ago

Kohima Mizo Presbyterian Church (Mizo: Kohima Mizo Kohhran Biak In), is a church located in Kohima in the Indian state of Nagaland. Established in 1957, the church is the earliest Mizo church located outside Mizoram. It was formerly under Zoram Pawn Mizo Kohhran (ZPMK), it is now administered by the Mizoram Presbyterian Church Synod, which appoints its pastor.

== See also ==
- Presbyterian Church of India
- Mizoram Presbyterian Church Synod
- Christianity in Nagaland
