= Sakhrie Park =

Public park in Kohima

- Interactive map of Sakhrie Park
- Type: Urban park
- Location: Middle Tsiepfü Tsiepfhe Ward (Middle AG), Kohima, Nagaland, India
- Coordinates: 25°39′18″N 94°06′21″E
- Area: 0.68 acres (0.28 ha; 0.00106 mi^{2}; 0.0028 km^{2})
- Created: 2016; 10 years ago
- Owner: VAST Group
- Open: Tuesday to Saturday – 10:00 a.m. to 6:00 p.m. Sunday – 12:00 p.m. to 6:00 p.m.

Sakhrie Park is an urban park located at Middle Tsiepfü Tsiepfhe Ward (Middle AG) in Kohima, Nagaland in north-eastern India. The park was opened to public on 7 April 2016.

The area was previously a garbage dump and sinking area due to which it was prone to landslides. The project was undertaken by a private firm VAST Group which transformed the wasteland into an urban park. The park is equipped with numerous facilities such as a café, a candy store, a children's park, a conference room, a multipurpose hall, and a parking lot.
