= Kohima North Police Station =

Coordinates: 25.675742°N 94.109239°E

- Interactive map of Kohima North Police Station

General information
- Status: Operating
- Type: Police Station
- Location: Keziekie Ward, Kohima, Nagaland, India
- Completed: 1933

Kohima North Police Station, is a police station located at Keziekie Ward near the Kohima Village entry gate in Kohima, Nagaland, India. Established in 1933, it is the oldest police station in Nagaland.

As of April 2022, the highly controversial Armed Forces (Special Powers) Act (AFSPA) is still applicable in the station's jurisdiction along with 14 other Police Stations in Nagaland. In April 2022, the Indian Government in major development reduced the disturbed areas of the AFSPA for the first time in Nagaland and several other North Eastern states.

== History ==
Kohima North Police Station was opened in 1933 as the first police station to be established under the then-Naga Hills District of Assam Province, British India (now Nagaland, India).

In 2020, the station became the first police station and a government facility in the entire North Eastern Region of India to receive the International Organization for Standardization (ISO) 9001 Certification for quality management system.
