= Feast of Merit =

Traditional prestige-giving ceremonial institution among the Nagas

- Type: Ceremonial feast
- Practised by: Nagas
- Region: present day Northeast India (Nagaland · Manipur)
- Purpose: Social prestige, wealth redistribution, ritual status
- Associated rituals: Mithun sacrifice, communal feasting, house decoration

Feast of Merit is a traditional ceremonial institution practiced historically among the Nagas in present-day Northeast Indian states of Nagaland and Manipur. It involves the public distribution of wealth, typically through feasting, animal sacrifice and gift-giving to attain social prestige, ritual status and communal recognition.

The institution is associated with the sacrifice of valuable livestock such as mithun (gayal), buffalo and pigs. In return, the feast-giver acquires symbolic privileges, including the right to wear distinctive ceremonial shawls, erect decorated house-fronts and display carvings or architectural markers denoting status.

== Overview ==
The Feast of Merit functions as a system of wealth redistribution and status acquisition. Rather than accumulating material wealth privately, individuals gain prestige by publicly sharing resources with the whole village.

Among Naga groups, the feast often consists of multiple stages, each requiring increasing expenditure and ritual obligations. Completion of successive feasts elevates social rank and may grant hereditary prestige to descendant.

== Regional variations ==
Different Naga communities use distinct local names and ritual forms Marān Kasā, among the Tangkhul Nagas. Zhotho, among the Chakhesang Nagas.

== See also ==
- Gift economy
- Potlatch
