= NAJ Cosfest =

Cosplay event in Kohima, India

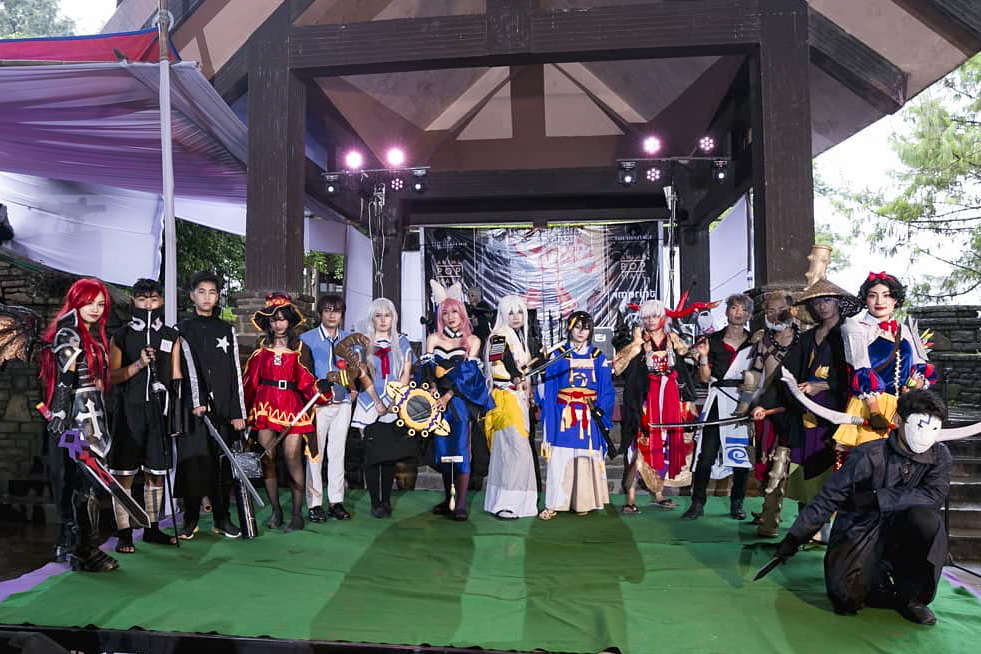
- Cosplayers at the 2018 NAJ Cosfest
- Status: Active
- Genre: Anime, Manga, Japanese pop culture
- Venue: The Heritage Kohima
- Locations: Kohima, Nagaland
- Country: India
- Inaugurated: 29 June 2013
- Previous event: 25–26 July 2026
- Organizer: Nagaland Anime Junkies

NAJ Cosfest, is an annual cosplay event held every year in the month of July at Kohima in the Indian state of Nagaland. The two-day festival is organised by the Nagaland Anime Junkies and is the biggest cosplay festival in the Northeast region of India.

== History ==
The Nagaland Anime Junkies was founded in 2011 by Biebe Natso. It started as a Facebook page to connect people with Anime interests from Nagaland.

The first edition of the NAJ Cosfest was held on 29 June 2013 with an attendance of 500.

== See also ==
- List of anime conventions
