= 1995 Kohima Massacre =

1995 massacre in Nagaland, India

- Part of Naga conflict
- Location: Kohima, Nagaland
- Date: 5 March 1995; 1:30–3:30 p.m. (IST)
- Target: Civilians
- Attack type: Massacre
- Deaths: 7
- Injuries: 36
- Perpetrators: 16th Rashtriya Rifles

The 1995 Kohima Massacre took place in India on 5 March 1995, when forces of the 16th Rashtriya Rifles of the Indian Army fired upon the civilian populace while the convoy was traversing through Kohima, the capital city of Nagaland.

The incident was sparked by a tyre burst from one of the convoy's own vehicle leading the armed troops to fire at civilians after mistaking the sound of the tyre bursting for a bomb attack.

== Incident ==
On 5 March 1995, a convoy of the 16th Rastriya Rifles (RR) was traversing through Kohima on its way from Bishnupur, Manipur, to Dimapur, Nagaland.

The heavily armed convoy which stretched over 5 kilometres (3.1 mi) had 63 vehicles with five officers, 15 JCOs and 400 privates. As the convoy was crossing the AOC and BOC area which is a thickly populated part of Kohima, a tyre on one of the convoy's truck burst which led the army personnel to react immediately. Unaware that the tyre burst was one of their own, the armed troops started firing at the civilian populace. The fired included 1,207 rounds of gunfire and five rounds of mortar fire. The firing continued from 1:30 p.m. until after 3:30 p.m. Seven civilians were killed and 36 were injured.

The RR personnel also deliberately attacked property, damaging buildings and houses. They then prevented the injured from being treated.

== Legacy ==
In 2022, TakeOne Nagaland produced a short documentary under its series Lest We Forget, documenting the fear and trauma arising from the incident.

== See also ==
- List of massacres in Nagaland
- List of massacres in India
