= Middle PWD Ward =

- Ward under Kohima
- Location in Nagaland, India
- Coordinates: 25.661427°N 94.104518°E
- Country: India
- State: Nagaland
- City: Kohima
- Time zone: UTC+5:30 (IST)

Middle PWD Ward is a ward located under Nagaland's capital city, Kohima. The ward falls under the designated Ward No. 11 of the Kohima Municipal Council.

== Education ==
Educational Institutions in Middle PWD Ward:

=== Schools ===
- Pinewood School

== See also ==
- Municipal Wards of Kohima
