= Lerie Ward =

- Ward under Kohima
- Location in Nagaland, India
- Coordinates: 25.650735°N 94.097593°E
- Country: India
- State: Nagaland
- City: Kohima
- Time zone: UTC+5:30 (IST)

Lerie Ward is a ward located under Nagaland's capital city, Kohima. The ward falls under the designated Ward No. 15 of the Kohima Municipal Council.

== Education ==
=== Educational Institutions in Lerie Ward ===
Colleges

- KROS College

Schools

- St. Mary's Cathedral Higher Secondary School
- The Vineyard School

== Notable residents ==
- Andrea Kevichüsa, Model and Actress
- Salhoutuonuo Kruse, the first woman to be elected to the Nagaland Legislative Assembly

== See also ==
- Municipal Wards of Kohima
