= Naga Bazaar Ward =

- Ward under Kohima
- Location in Nagaland, India
- Coordinates: 25.676506°N 94.104987°E
- Country: India
- State: Nagaland
- City: Kohima
- Time zone: UTC+5:30 (IST)

Naga Bazaar Ward is a ward located under Nagaland's capital city, Kohima. The ward falls under the designated Ward No. 4 of the Kohima Municipal Council and is sub-divided into Upper Naga Bazaar and Lower Naga Bazaar.

== Education ==
Educational Institutions in Naga Bazaar Ward:

=== Schools ===
- Naga Bazaar Baptist School
- Naga Bazaar Government Middle School
- Naga Bazaar Government Primary School

== See also ==
- Municipal Wards of Kohima
