= Kitsübozou Ward =

- Ward under Kohima
- Location in Nagaland, India
- Coordinates: 25.674820°N 94.111170°E
- Country: India
- State: Nagaland
- City: Kohima
- Incorporated: 1970
- Time zone: UTC+5:30 (IST)

Kitsübozou Ward is a ward located under Nagaland's capital city, Kohima. The ward falls under the designated Ward No. 5 of the Kohima Municipal Council.

== Education ==
Educational Institutions in Kitsübozou Ward:

=== Schools ===
- Kitsübozou Government Primary School
- Oking Christian School
- Tabitha Enabling Academy School

== See also ==
- Municipal Wards of Kohima
