= Sepfüzou Ward =

- Ward under Kohima
- Location in Nagaland, India
- Coordinates: 25.681551°N 94.102405°E
- Country: India
- State: Nagaland
- City: Kohima
- Time zone: UTC+5:30 (IST)

Sepfüzou Ward is a ward located under Nagaland's capital city, Kohima. The ward falls under the designated Ward No. 2 of the Kohima Municipal Council.

== Education ==
Educational Institutions in Sepfüzou Ward:

=== Colleges ===
- Alder College

=== Schools ===
- Sepfüzou Government Primary School

== See also ==
- Municipal Wards of Kohima
