= Daklane Ward =

- Ward under Kohima
- Location in Nagaland, India
- Coordinates: 25.672028°N 94.107171°E
- Country: India
- State: Nagaland
- City: Kohima
- Time zone: UTC+5:30 (IST)

Daklane Ward is a ward located under Nagaland's capital city, Kohima. The ward falls under the designated Ward No. 7 of the Kohima Municipal Council.

== Education ==
Educational Institutions in Daklane Ward:

=== Colleges ===
- Mount Olive College

=== Schools ===
- Charity School
- Daklane Government Higher Secondary School

== Notable residents ==
- Vizol Angami (1914–2008), fourth Chief Minister of Nagaland

== See also ==
- Municipal Wards of Kohima
