= Lok Bhavan, Kohima =

Residence of the Governor of Nagaland

Lok Bhavan, Nagaland
- Interactive map of the Lok Bhavan, Nagaland area

General information
- Coordinates: 25.666531°N 94.100363°E
- Current tenants: Nand Kishore Yadav
- Owner: Government of Nagaland

References
- Website

Lok Bhavan formerly Raj Bhavan (translation: Government House) is the official residence of the governor of Nagaland. It is located in the capital city of Kohima, Nagaland.

== See also ==
- Government Houses of the British Indian Empire
