= Jail Ward =

- Ward under Kohima
- Location in Nagaland, India
- Coordinates: 25.657162°N 94.096170°E
- Country: India
- State: Nagaland
- City: Kohima
- Time zone: UTC+5:30 (IST)

Jail Ward is a ward located under Nagaland's capital city, Kohima. The ward falls under the designated Ward No. 19 of the Kohima Municipal Council.

== See also ==
- Municipal Wards of Kohima
