= 1986 Killings of Kekuojalie Sachü and Vikhozo Yhoshü =

1986 killing of students by police forces in Kohima, Nagaland, India

- Kekuojalie Sachü (left) and Vikhozo Yhoshü (right)
- Location: Phoolbari Junction, Kohima, Nagaland, India
- Date: 20 March 1986
- Deaths: 2
- Injuries: 50
- Victims: Two students: Vikhozo Yhoshü (Student of Kohima English School now known as Mezhür Higher Secondary School); Kekuojalie Sachü (Student of Baptist English School now known as Baptist High)
- Perpetrator: Nagaland Police
- Motive: Protest

The 1986 Killings of Kekuojalie Sachü and Vikhozo Yhoshü was the killing of the two students in indiscriminate firing by the Nagaland State Police Forces on 20 March 1986 while they participated in a peaceful protest called by the Naga Students' Federation (NSF) to rally against the State Government's decision on the introduction of Indian Police Service (IPS) cadres and the extension of the Disturbed Area Belt from 5 to 20 km along the Indo-Myanmar (Indo-Burma) border.

The event was so tumultuous that it led to three Cabinet Ministers and five State Ministers of Nagaland tendering their resignation.

== Background ==
The NSF was observing a peaceful 12 hour protest against the introduction of India Police Service (IPS) in Nagaland and the extension of the 5 km Disturbed Area Belt to 20 km along the international border by the Government of India.

"The incident was sparked off by the Chief Secretary of Nagaland, I. Longkümer, knowing fully well that the Naga Students' Federation had called a hartal from 6 am to 6 pm, he was on his way to his office in a car when NSF volunteers stopped him. He was not harassed in any manner nor was his car damaged and a magistrate on duty drove him back to his official residence. But he falsely alleged that the student had manhandled him and damaged his vehicle, as a result of which 144 CrPC was imposed in TCP Gate, MLA Hostel junction and Razhü Point junction."

— NSF narrates on the incident

Not wanting to confront the police, the students' leaders negotiated with the Magistrate and Police officers on duty. The NSF said, “They arrived of an agreement that the students will move out of the 144 CrPC imposed areas and that the students will be allowed to continue their peaceful hartal.”

== Police firing ==
As the students were moving out of the MLA Hostel Junction (Phoolbari) as directed by their leader, the Police opened fire on them without any information and warning, killing two and injuring approximately 50 others. In the melee, Vikhozo Yhoshü, 14-year-old student of Kohima English School (Now known as Mezhür Higher Secondary School) and Kekuojalie Sachü, 19-year-old student of Baptist English School (Now known as Baptist High) were shot and killed.

== Reactions ==
Following the killing, eight Ministers tendered their resignation to the Chief Minister. They were T. A. Ngüllie—the then-Minister for Finance & Taxation and Land Revenue & Power, I. K. Sema—the then-Minister for Agriculture & Horticulture, Vizadel Sakhrie—the then-Minister for Public Health and Family Welfare, H. L. Singson—the then-Minister for Relief & Rehabilitation, Jail and Industries, Puse Zhotso—the then-Minister for Information & Public Relations, Tourism and Power, Nocklem Konyak—the then-minister for Printing & Stationery and Agriculture, Marchiba—the then-Minister for Fisheries and Public Health Engineering and Nokzenketba—the then-Minister for Soil Conservation and Art & Culture.

== Funeral ==
Almost 50,000 Nagas attended the funeral service of Vikhozo Yhoshü and Kekuojalie Sachü at the Kohima Local Ground, which today is the venue of the Martyrs' Memorial Trophy.

== Legacy ==
“On hearing about my brother being shot, our father decided to go to town with his gun but the villagers stopped him. That was one of the most depressing days — a day I cannot forget in my entire lifetime.”

— Thinuohelie Sachü, the younger brother of Kekuojalie recalls (Quote: The Hindu, from 15 October 2015 interview).

“I would dream about my son for nights. One day he appeared in my dream dressed in white and I ran towards him, trying to grab him. But then he disappeared. After that I never saw him in my dreams again. They not only shot my son but smashed all his fingers with rifle butts. My heart aches every time I think or talk of him. His scars always come fresh in front of me.”

— Neibano Yhoshü, the mother of Vikhozo recalls (Quote: The Hindu, from 15 October 2015 interview).

=== NSF Martyrs' Memorial Trophy ===
In commemoration of the incident, the NSF Martyrs' Memorial Trophy is held annually.
