= Kohima Jain temple =

Jain temples in Nagaland

Kohima Jain Temple
- Kohima Jain Temple

- Location within Nagaland Kohima Jain temple (India)

Religion
- Affiliation: Jainism
- Sect: Digambar
- Deity: Mahavira
- Festivals: Mahavir Jayanti, Paryushan

Location
- Location: Kohima, Nagaland
- Coordinates: 25°40′35″N 94°06′33″E

Architecture
- Creator: Shri Hardeo Sethi, Shri Hiralal Sethi
- Established: 1920

Kohima Jain Temple is located in Kohima, Nagaland. This temple is the oldest Jain temple in Nagaland built in 1920.

== History ==
During the pre-independence era, most of the Jain families in Nagaland were settled in Kohima. The first Jain temple in Nagaland was built in Kohima in 1920 by the 8 Sethi families whose patriarchs were Shri Hardeo Sethi and Shri Hiralal Sethi. However these families later moved to Dimapur in 1944 due to Japanese invasion during the World War II. The Moolnayak of the temple is an idol of Mahavira. These families then built the Dimapur Jain Temple in 1947, SD Jain School in 1947 and the SD Jain Charitable Hospital in 1975. The first President of the Kohima Jain Temple Committee was Shri Devalal Sethi followed by Shri Jethmal Sethi. Shri Phulchand Sethi served as the Secretary of the Temple. Shri Phulchand Sethi became the President of the Kohima Jain Temple Committee in 1947 and continued till 1965. He was followed by Shri Kishanlal Sethi, Shri Gaurilal Sethi, Shri Prakash Chand Sethi and Shri Sohanlal Sethi. Shri Pawan Kumar Sethi, son of Phulchand Sethi is the current president of the Kohima Jain Temple Committee.

== Gallery ==
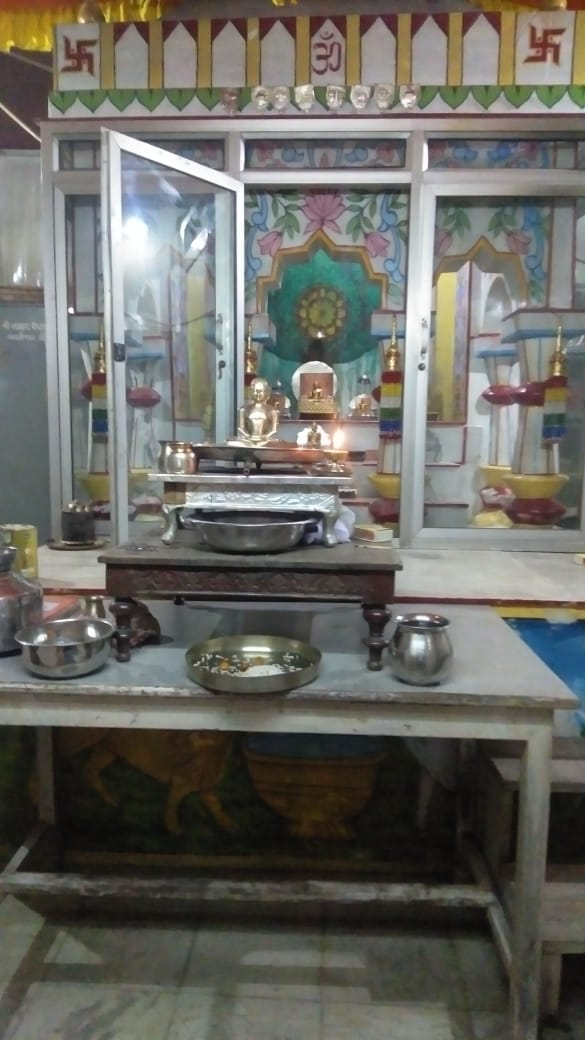
Inside the Kohima Jain Temple

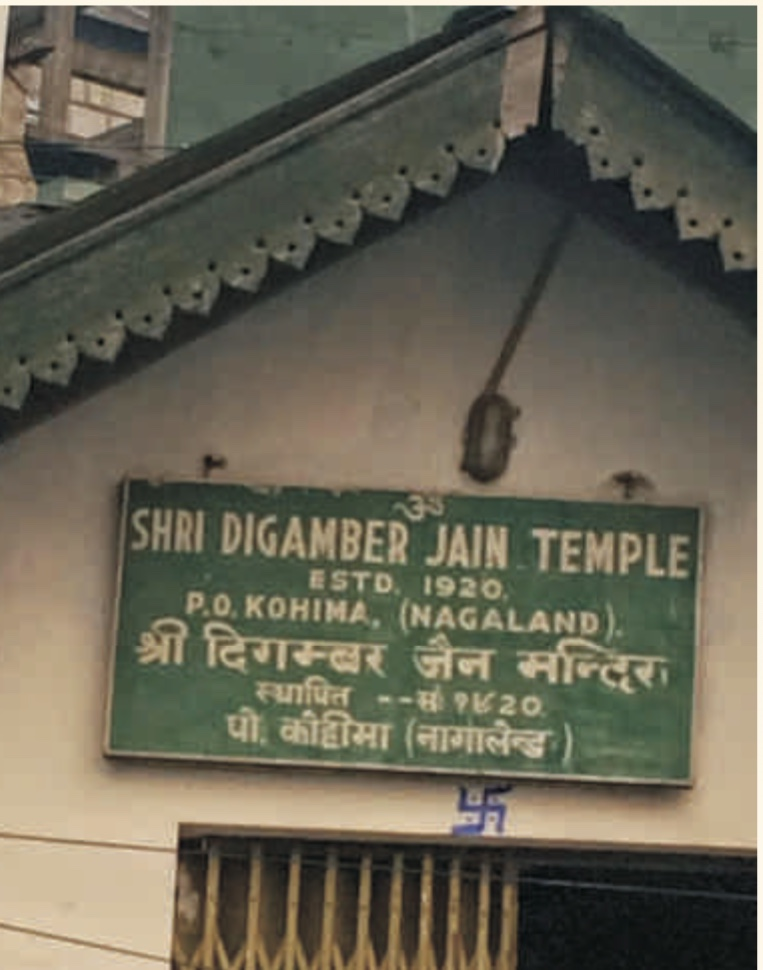
Board outside the Kohima Jain Temple

== See also ==
- Jainism in Nagaland
- Kohima
