= Lower Mediezie Ward =

Lower Mediezie Ward Lower Agri
- Ward under Kohima
- Location in Nagaland, India
- Coordinates: 25.659413°N 94.094284°E
- Country: India
- State: Nagaland
- City: Kohima
- Incorporated: 1994

Population (2019)
  - Total: 2,000
- Time zone: UTC+5:30 (IST)

Lower Mediezie Ward also known as Lower Agri Ward is a ward located under Nagaland's capital city, Kohima. The ward falls under the designated Ward No. 17 of the Kohima Municipal Council.

== See also ==
- Municipal Wards of Kohima
