= Forest Ward, Kohima =

Forest Ward
- Ward under Kohima
- Location in Nagaland, India
- Coordinates: 25.661775°N 94.087806°E
- Country: India
- State: Nagaland
- City: Kohima
- Time zone: UTC+5:30 (IST)

Forest Ward is a ward located under Nagaland's capital city, Kohima. The ward falls under the designated Ward No. 17 of the Kohima Municipal Council.

== See also ==
- Municipal Wards of Kohima
