= Old Ministers' Hill Ward =

- Ward under Kohima
- Location in Nagaland, India
- Coordinates: 25.656462°N 94.096663°E
- Country: India
- State: Nagaland
- City: Kohima
- Time zone: UTC+5:30 (IST)

Old Ministers' Hill Ward is a ward located under Nagaland's capital city, Kohima. The ward falls under the designated Ward No. 14 of the Kohima Municipal Council.

== History ==
=== 2025 murder case ===
Old Ministers' Hill was the site of the 2025 murder of Vihozhonü Zao, inside her home. Vihozhonü's adopted uncle, Samuel Zao, was arrested in connection with the case.

== Education ==
Educational Institutions in Old Ministers' Hill Ward:

- Dainty Buds School
- Ministers' Hill Baptist Higher Secondary School
- RDNUMS School

== See also ==
- Municipal Wards of Kohima
