= D Block Ward =

- Ward under Kohima
- Location in Nagaland, India
- Coordinates: 25.673194°N 94.108962°E
- Country: India
- State: Nagaland
- City: Kohima
- Time zone: UTC+5:30 (IST)

D Block Ward is a ward located under Nagaland's capital city, Kohima. The ward falls under the designated Ward No. 6 of the Kohima Municipal Council.

== Education ==
Educational Institutions in D Block Ward: Colony Chairman is Thenusou Sekhose of D Block elected as the Deputy Chairperson of the Kohima Municipal Council (KMC)

=== Schools ===
- Assam Rifles Public School
- D Block Government Primary School
- East View Home School
- Savio Kindergarten School

=== Colleges ===
- Ura College of Teachers' Education

== See also ==
- Municipal Wards of Kohima
