= New Market Ward =

- Ward under Kohima
- Location in Nagaland, India
- Coordinates: 25.669477°N 94.102363°E
- Country: India
- State: Nagaland
- City: Kohima
- Time zone: UTC+5:30 (IST)

New Market Ward is a ward located under Nagaland's capital city, Kohima. The ward falls under the designated Ward No. 8 of the Kohima Municipal Council.

== Education ==
Educational Institutions in Daklane Ward:

=== Schools ===
- Modern School
- New Market Government High School

== See also ==
- Municipal Wards of Kohima
