= Kewhira Dielie =

Indian newspaper

- Type: Monthly newspaper
- Format: Single-Sheet Legal
- Publisher: George W. Supplee
- Founded: 1932
- Language: Tenyidie
- City: Kohima
- Country: British India (Now India)

Kewhira Dielie (lit. Kohima News) was a monthly Tenyidie newspaper published from Kohima. It was the first modern newspaper from present-day Nagaland, India. The newspaper was a single-sheet legal sized paper printed on both sides and was published by George W. Supplee, an American Baptist Missionary who was based in Kohima.

== See also ==
- List of newspapers in Nagaland
