= Keziekie Ward =

Municipal ward in Nagaland, India

Keziekie Ward North Block
- Ward under Kohima
- Location in Nagaland, India
- Coordinates: 25.677488°N 94.109652°E
- Country: India
- State: Nagaland
- City: Kohima
- Time zone: UTC+5:30 (IST)

Keziekie Ward is a ward located under Nagaland's capital city, Kohima. The ward falls under the designated Ward No. 3 of the Kohima Municipal Council.

== Education ==
Educational Institutions in Keziekie Ward:

=== Schools ===
- Keziekie Government Primary School

== See also ==
- Municipal Wards of Kohima
