= Peraciezie Ward =

Peraciezie Ward High School
- Ward under Kohima
- Location in Nagaland, India
- Coordinates: 25.688963°N 94.098448°E
- Country: India
- State: Nagaland
- City: Kohima
- Time zone: UTC+5:30 (IST)

Peraciezie Ward is a ward located under Nagaland's capital city, Kohima. The ward falls under the designated Ward No. 1 of the Kohima Municipal Council.

== Education ==
Educational Institutions in Peraciezie Ward:

- G. Rio School
- Rüzhükhrie Government Higher Secondary School

== See also ==
- Municipal Wards of Kohima
