= Kohima Lotha Baptist Church =

- KLBC
- Kohima Lotha Baptist Church
- 25.662257°N 94.105581°E
- Location: Lower Chandmari Ward, Kohima, Nagaland
- Country: India
- Denomination: Baptist
- Website: www.klbconline.com

History
- Founded: 1956; 70 years ago
- Dedicated: 10 September 2017

Architecture
- Years built: 2011–2017
- Groundbreaking: 2011
- Completed: September 2017

Specifications
- Capacity: 3000

Kohima Lotha Baptist Church is a Baptist church located in the locality of Lower Chandmari Ward, Kohima, Nagaland, India. The church building was opened in 2017, although the congregation had been formed since 1956. It is one of the biggest Lotha Baptist churches in Nagaland and also the main church building of the Lotha Nagas in Kohima city.

== History ==
The Kohima Lotha Baptist Church was established on 4 March 1956. The old church building was demolished in 2011 and a new building was constructed in 2017. Today the church has a total membership of 2406 with 7 sectoral fellowships across the city.

== Architecture ==
The four floored building has a 3000 seating capacity with two floors in the basement for vehicular parking. It was built at a cost of ₹ 1,63,65,000. Hutoshe Awomi as the Chief Engineer and Nungsangwati as the Chief Architect.

== See also ==
- Christianity in Nagaland
