= Nagaland Post =

Nagaland daily Newspaper

- Front page for 5 March 2018
- Type: Daily newspaper
- Format: Print, online
- Owner: Geoffrey Yaden
- Publisher: Geoffrey Yaden
- Founded: 3 December 1990; 35 years ago
- Political alignment: Independent
- Language: English
- City: Dimapur
- Country: India
- Circulation: 61,394
- Price: INR 5
- Website: nagalandpost.com

Nagaland Post is an English newspaper published from Dimapur in the Indian state of Nagaland. It is the first and highest circulated daily newspaper of Nagaland state and also the first newspaper in Nagaland to be published in multi-colour.

Nagaland Post was established on 3 December 1990, and is currently a 12-page English daily. According to space requirements, the newspaper is occasionally increased to 16 pages, except on Sundays. The newspaper adds a four-page supplement every Sunday called "Sunday Post" with the regular 12 page newspaper.

== See also ==
- List of newspapers in Nagaland
