= Upper Mediezie Ward =

Upper Mediezie Ward Upper Agri
- Ward under Kohima
- Location in Nagaland, India
- Coordinates: 25.657474°N 94.091200°E
- Country: India
- State: Nagaland
- City: Kohima
- Time zone: UTC+5:30 (IST)

Upper Mediezie Ward also known as Upper Agri Ward is a ward located under Nagaland's capital city, Kohima. The ward falls under the designated Ward No. 17 of the Kohima Municipal Council.

== Education ==
Educational Institutions in Upper Agri Ward:

=== Schools ===
- Fernwood School
- Stella Higher Secondary School

== See also ==
- Municipal Wards of Kohima
