= Thegabakha Ward =

Thegabakha Ward Officers' Hill
- Ward under Kohima
- Location in Nagaland, India
- Coordinates: 25.665240°N 94.099148°E
- Country: India
- State: Nagaland
- City: Kohima
- Time zone: UTC+5:30 (IST)

Thegabakha Ward also known as Officers' Hill is a ward located under Nagaland's capital city, Kohima. The ward falls under the designated Ward No. 10 of the Kohima Municipal Council.

== Education ==
Educational Institutions in Thegabakha Ward:

=== Schools ===
- Thegabakha Government Primary School

== See also ==
- Municipal Wards of Kohima
