= Kenuozou Hill Ward =

Municipal ward in Nagaland, India

- Ward under Kohima
- Location in Nagaland, India
- Coordinates: 25.684239°N 94.108900°E
- Country: India
- State: Nagaland
- City: Kohima
- Time zone: UTC+5:30 (IST)

Kenuozou Hill Ward is a ward located under Nagaland's capital city, Kohima. The ward falls under the designated Ward No. 3 of the Kohima Municipal Council.

== Education ==
Educational Institutions in Kenuozou Ward:

=== Schools ===
- Kenuozou Government Primary School
- Mount Hermon Higher Secondary School

== See also ==
- Municipal Wards of Kohima
