= Merhülietsa Ward =

Merhülietsa Ward Para Medical
- Ward under Kohima
- Location in Nagaland, India
- Coordinates: 25.665471°N 94.092069°E
- Country: India
- State: Nagaland
- City: Kohima
- Time zone: UTC+5:30 (IST)

Merhülietsa Ward also known as Para Medical is a ward located under Nagaland's capital city, Kohima. The ward falls under the designated Ward No. 18 of the Kohima Municipal Council.

== Education ==
Educational Institutions in Merhülietsa Ward:

=== Schools ===
- Merhülietsa Government Middle School
- Merhülietsa School
- St. John School

== See also ==
- Municipal Wards of Kohima
