= Pulie Badze =

Geographic feature in Nagaland

- Location within Nagaland Location within India Location within Asia Location within Earth

Highest point
- Elevation: 2,296 m (7,533 ft)
- Coordinates: 25°38′53″N 94°4′21″E

Geography
- Location: Jotsoma, Kohima District, Nagaland

Pulie Badze is a mountain peak in Kohima District of the Indian state of Nagaland, standing at an elevation of 2,296 m (7,533 ft) overlooking the capital city of Nagaland, Kohima. It is the centerpiece of Pulie Badze Wildlife Sanctuary.

The mountain's name means "Pulie's Seat", named after the legendary folktale character "Pulie".
