= Police Reserve Hill Ward =

Police Reserve Hill Ward P. R. Hill
- Ward under Kohima

- Location in Nagaland, India
- Coordinates: 25.658666°N 94.099117°E
- Country: India
- State: Nagaland
- City: Kohima
- Time zone: UTC+5:30 (IST)

Police Reserve Hill Ward also known as P. R. Hill is a ward located under Nagaland's capital city, Kohima. The ward falls under the designated Ward No. 19 of the Kohima Municipal Council.

== Attractions ==
- Kohima Capital Cultural Center

The Kohima Capital Cultural Center is located at Police Reserve Hill.

== See also ==
- Municipal Wards of Kohima
