= Kohima Capital Cultural Center =

Cultural center in Kohima, Nagaland

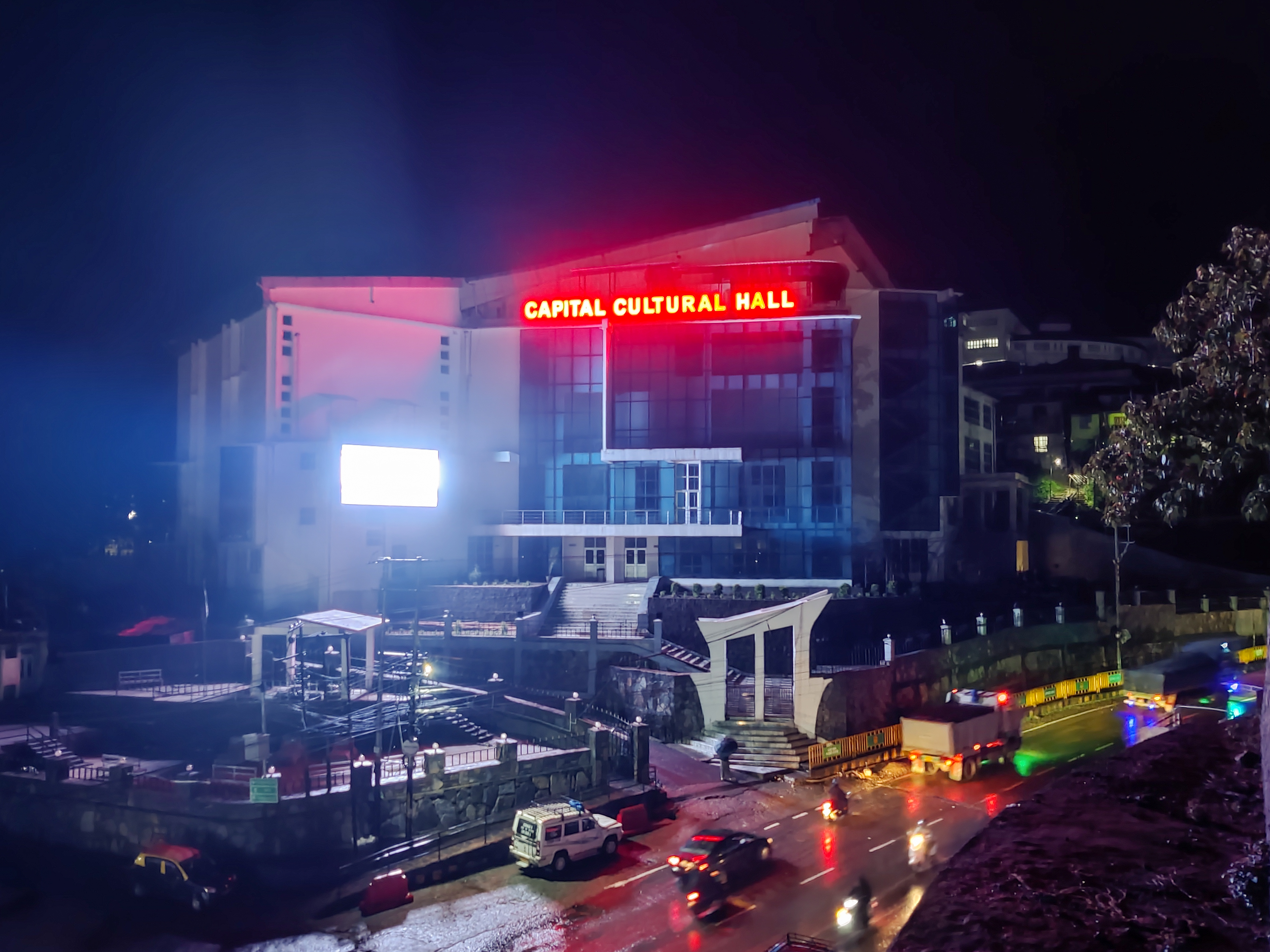
- Interactive map of the Kohima Capital Cultural Center area

General information
- Location: Kohima, Nagaland, India
- Coordinates: 25°39′37″N 94°6′3″E

The Kohima Capital Cultural Center is a cultural center located at Kohima, Nagaland, India.

The center includes exhibition halls, conference hall with 150 seating capacity, restaurant with pantry, dedicated basement parking facility for 40 cars and many other facilities.

== History ==
The project was first sanctioned in 2005 and construction soon began but was halted for more than a decade due to a land dispute issue. Under the supervision of the Kohima Smart City Development Ltd. (KSCDL), construction resumed in 2019 and was completed one month ahead of its schedule in November 2021. The cultural center was opened to public on 1 December 2021.
