= Lower Police Reserve Hill Ward =

Lower Police Reserve Hill Ward Lower P. R. Tinglepork Jr.
- Ward under Kohima
- Location in Nagaland, India
- Coordinates: 25.660986°N 94.097939°E
- Country: India
- State: Nagaland
- City: Kohima
- Time zone: UTC+5:30 (IST)

Lower Police Reserve Hill Ward also known as Lower P. R. Hill is a ward located under Nagaland's capital city, Kohima. The ward falls under the designated Ward No. 19 of the Kohima Municipal Council.

== Education ==
Educational Institutions in Lower Police Reserve Hill Ward:

=== Schools ===
- Lower P.R. Hill Government Primary School
- St. Peter's School

== See also ==
- Municipal Wards of Kohima
