= New Ministers' Hill Ward =

- Ward
- Location in Nagaland, India
- Coordinates: 25.650735°N 94.097593°E
- Country: India
- State: Nagaland
- City: Kohima
- Time zone: UTC+5:30 (IST)

New Ministers' Hill Ward is a ward located under Nagaland's capital city, Kohima. The ward falls under the designated Ward No. 15 of the Kohima Municipal Council.

== Education ==
Educational Institutions in New Ministers' Hill Ward:

- Little Flower Higher Secondary School
- Mount Sinai Higher Secondary School

== See also ==
- Municipal Wards of Kohima
