= Tsiepfü Tsiepfhe Ward =

Tsiepfü Tsiepfhe Ward AG Ward
- Ward under Kohima
- Location in Nagaland, India
- Coordinates: 25°39′23″N 94°6′36″E
- Country: India
- State: Nagaland
- City: Kohima
- Time zone: UTC+5:30 (IST)

Tsiepfü Tsiepfhe Ward also AG is a ward located under Nagaland's capital city, Kohima. The ward falls under the designated Ward No. 15 of the Kohima Municipal Council and is sub-divided into three sub-wards: Upper Tsiepfü Tsiepfhe, Middle Tsiepfü Tsiepfhe and Lower Tsiepfü Tsiepfhe.

== Education ==
Educational Institutions in Tsiepfü Tsiepfhe Ward:

=== Colleges ===
- Model Christian College, Kohima

=== Schools ===
- Azedon School
- Corragio School
- Tsiepfü Tsiepfhe Government Primary School
- Holy Family School
- Model Higher Secondary School
- Rosemount International Preschool

== See also ==
- Municipal Wards of Kohima
