= Dzüvürü Ward =

Dzüvürü Ward Porterlane
- Ward under Kohima
- Coordinates: 25.656018°N 94.1100116°E
- Country: India
- State: Nagaland
- City: Kohima

Government
  - Type: Dzüvürü Council
- Time zone: UTC+5:30 (IST)

Dzüvürü Ward also known as Porterlane, is a ward located under Nagaland's capital city, Kohima.

== Education ==
Educational Institutions in Dzüvürü Ward:

=== Colleges ===
- Modern College, Kohima

=== Schools ===
- Dzüvürü Public School
- Porterlane Government Middle School
- Schola 'Lojes' School

== See also ==
- Municipal Wards of Kohima
