= Upper Chandmari Ward =

- Ward under Kohima
- Location in Nagaland, India
- Coordinates: 25.657265°N 94.103539°E
- Country: India
- State: Nagaland
- City: Kohima
- Time zone: UTC+5:30 (IST)

Upper Chandmari Ward is a ward located under Nagaland's capital city, Kohima. The ward falls under the designated Ward No. 12 of the Kohima Municipal Council.

== Education ==
Educational Institutions in Upper Chandmari Ward:

=== Schools ===
- Chandmari Higher Secondary School
- Genesis School
- Government High School

== See also ==
- Municipal Wards of Kohima
