= Bayavü Hill Ward =

- Ward under Kohima
- Location in Nagaland, India
- Coordinates: 25.688963°N 94.098448°E
- Country: India
- State: Nagaland
- City: Kohima
- Time zone: UTC+5:30 (IST)

Bayavü Hill Ward is a ward located under Nagaland's capital city, Kohima. The ward falls under the designated Ward No. 2 of the Kohima Municipal Council and is sub-divided into Upper Bayavü Hill and Lower Bayavü Hill.

== Attractions ==
- Nagaland State Museum

The Nagaland State Museum located in Bayavü Hill Ward and displays a comprehensive collection of artefacts including ancient sculptures, traditional dresses, inscriptions of the Naga people.

== Education ==
Educational Institutions in Bayavü Ward:

=== Schools ===
- Bayavü Higher Secondary School
- Bayavü Government Middle School
- Grace Higher Secondary School
- Vinyüzo School

== See also ==
- Municipal Wards of Kohima
