= Regional Centre of Excellence for Music & Performing Arts =

Cultural center in Jotsoma, Kohima District, Nagaland

- Interactive map of the Regional Centre of Excellence for Music & Performing Arts area
- Alternative names: RCEMPA

General information
- Location: Jotsoma, Kohima District, Nagaland, India
- Coordinates: 25.663479°N 94.075075°E
- Completed: 2013; 13 years ago
- Inaugurated: 1 December 2013; 12 years ago

The Regional Centre of Excellence for Music & Performing Arts (RCEMPA) is a cultural center located at Jotsoma, Kohima District, Nagaland, India. The center has a multipurpose hall and a gallery of contemporary art which allows artists to display and sell their art on spot.
