= Lower Chandmari Ward =

- Ward under Kohima
- Location in Nagaland, India
- Coordinates: 25.662357°N 94.105441°E
- Country: India
- State: Nagaland
- City: Kohima
- Time zone: UTC+5:30 (IST)

Lower Chandmari Ward is a ward located under Nagaland's capital city, Kohima. The ward falls under the designated Ward No. 13 of the Kohima Municipal Council.

== Attractions ==
- Kohima Lotha Baptist Church

The Kohima Lotha Baptist Church is one of the biggest churches in Kohima is located at Lower Chandmari Ward.

== Education ==
Educational Institutions in Lower Chandmari Ward:

=== Schools ===
- Lower Chandmari Government Middle School
- St. Joseph High School
- Government High School

== See also ==
- Municipal Wards of Kohima
