= Administrative divisions of Kohima =

The Municipal Wards of Kohima are the nineteen wards comprising the capital city of Nagaland, Kohima. The municipality covers an area of about 20 km² with a population of 115,609. Each ward has its own council government and handles many of the functions that are handled by city governments in other jurisdictions.

== List of municipal wards ==
Municipal Wards of Kohima
Sector	Name	Abbreviations
Ward No. 1	Peraciezie (High School)	
Ward No. 2	Bayavü Hill	
Ward No. 2	Sepfüzou	
Ward No. 3	Kenuozou Hill	
Ward No. 3	Keziekie (North Block)	
Ward No. 4	Naga Bazaar	
Ward No. 5	Kitsübozou	
Ward No. 6	D. Block	
Ward No. 7	Daklane	
Ward No. 8	New Market	
Ward No. 9	Midland	
Ward No. 10	Thegabakha (Officers' Hill)	
Ward No. 10	Naga Hospital	
Ward No. 11	Upper PWD	Upper Public Works Department
Ward No. 11	Middle PWD	Middle Public Works Department
Ward No. 11	Lower PWD	Lower Public Works Department
Ward No. 12	Upper Chandmari	
Ward No. 13	Lower Chandmari	
Ward No. 14	Dzüvürü (Porterlane)	
Ward No. 14	Old Ministers' Hill	
Ward No. 15	Tsiepfü Tsiepfhe (AG)	Accountant General
Ward No. 16	New Ministers' Hill	
Ward No. 16	Lerie	
Ward No. 16	New Reserve	
Ward No. 17	Agri Farm	
Ward No. 17	Upper Mediezie (Upper Agri)	
Ward No. 17	Electrical	
Ward No. 17	Forest	
Ward No. 18	Merhülietsa (Para Medical)	
Ward No. 18	Lower Mediezie (Lower Agri)	
Ward No. 19	P.R. Hill	Police Reserve Hill
Ward No. 19	Lower P.R. Hill Ward	Lower Police Reserve Hill
Ward No. 19	Jail	

== See also ==
- Administrative division
- Urban area
