= Kohima =

Capital of the Indian state of Nagaland

Kohima Kewhira
- Capital city and municipality
- City of Kohima
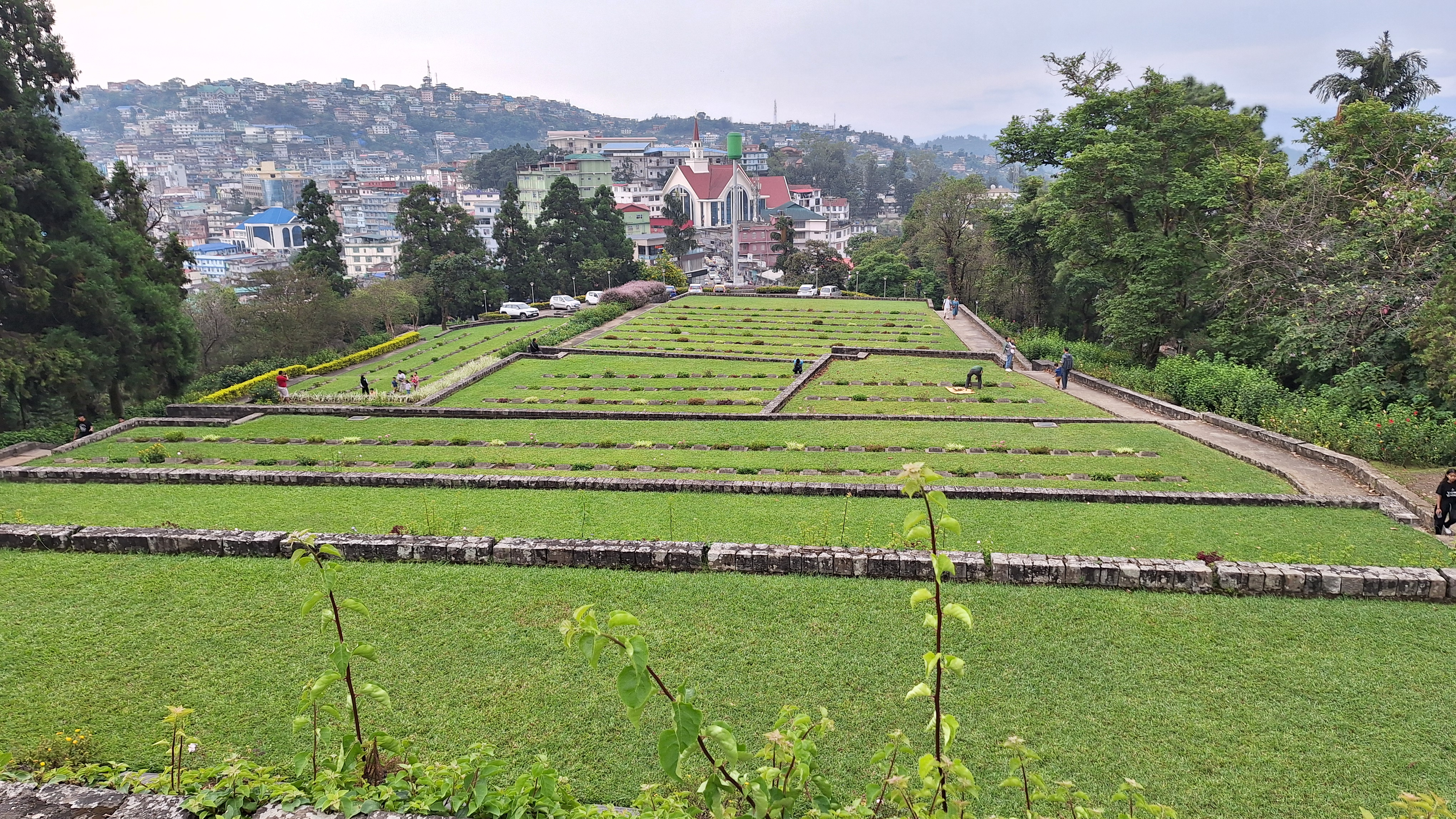
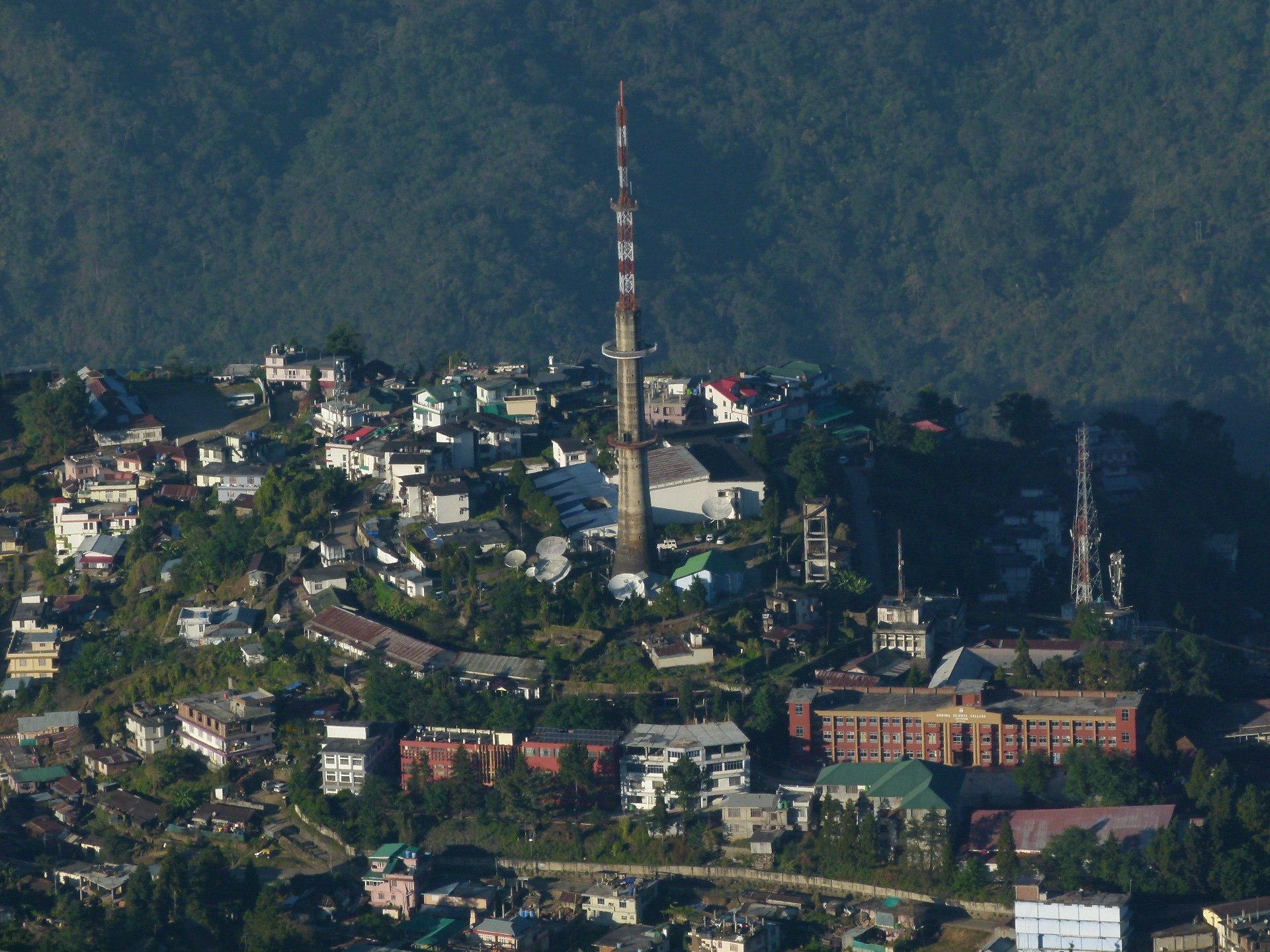
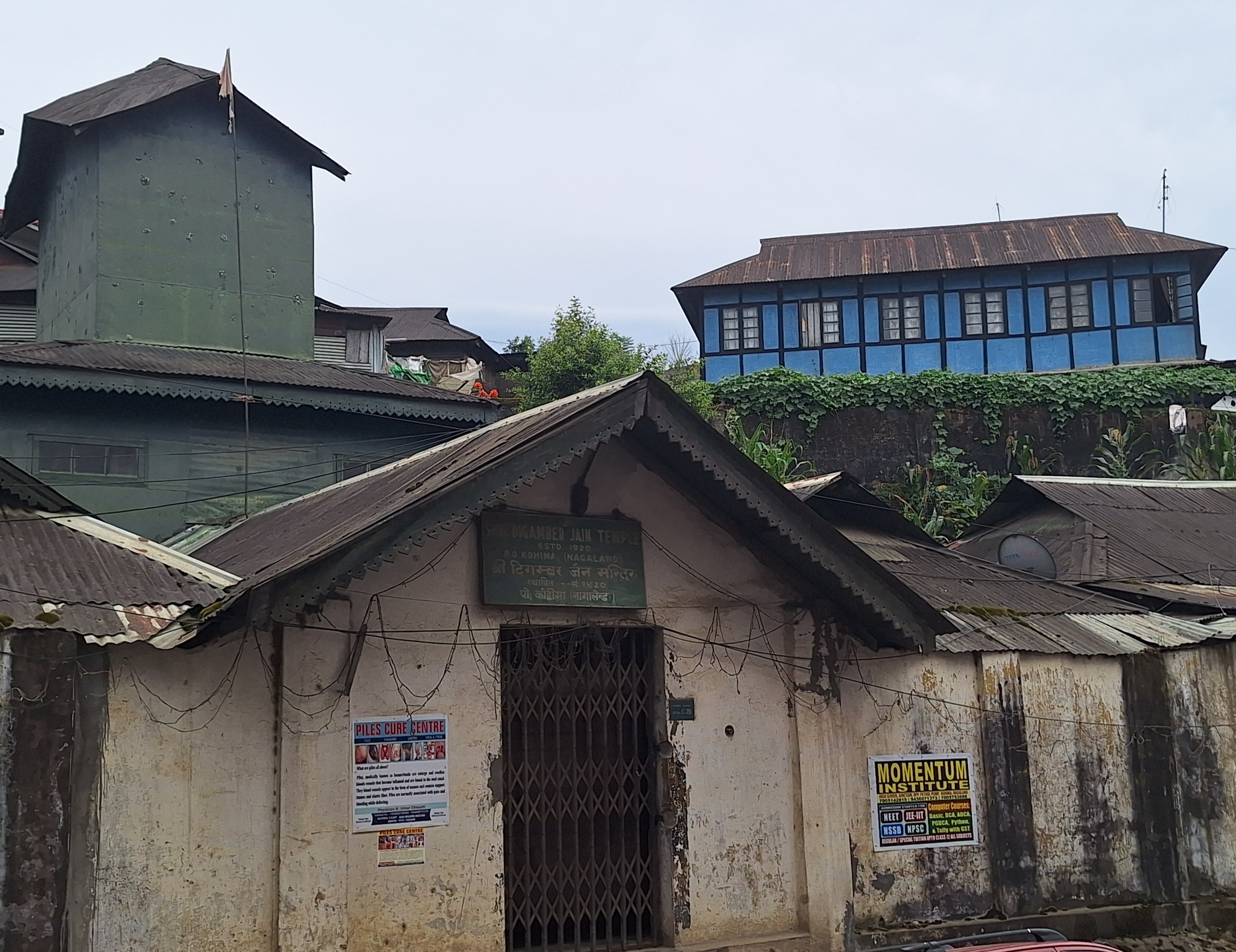
- Kohima skyline from Kohima Village Kohima War Cemetery Kohima Science College Vertical cityscape of Kohima Naga Bazaar Kohima Jain Temple
- Motto: "Work is Pride"
- Interactive map of Kohima
- Location of Kohima in Nagaland Kohima (India)
- Coordinates: 25.67°N 94.10°E
- Country: India
- Region: Northeast India
- State: Nagaland
- District: Kohima District
- Established: 1879
- Divisions: 19 municipal wards

Government
  - Type: Municipality
  - Body: Kohima Municipal Council
  - Chairperson: Neibodzelie Solo (Naga People's Front)
  - Deputy Chairperson: Thenuso-ü Sekhose, (Naga People's Front)
  - Administrator: Lanusenla Longkümer

Area
  - Total: 20 km^{2} (7.7 sq mi)
- Elevation: 1,444 m (4,738 ft)

Population (2011)
  - Total: 115,283
  - Density: 5,800/km^{2} (15,000/sq mi)
- Demonym(s): Kohimian kewhi–mia

Languages
  - Official: English
  - Major languages: Angami • Ao • Chakhesang • Lotha • Sümi
- Time zone: UTC+5:30 (IST)
- PIN: 797001
- Telephone code: 91 (0)370
- Vehicle registration: NL-01
- Sex ratio: 927 ♂/♀
- Climate: Temperate (Köppen)
- Website: kmc.nagaland.gov.in

Kohima (/koʊˈhiːmə/; Tenyidie: Kewhira (IPA: [ˈkɛʍɪɻə])) is the capital of the North East Indian state of Nagaland. With a resident population of almost 100,000, it is the second largest city in the state. Kohima constitutes both a district and a municipality. The municipality covers 20 km^{2} (7.7 sq mi). The city lies on the foothills of Japfü section of the Barail Range located south of the district (25.67°N 94.12°E) and has an average elevation of 1,261 m (4,137 ft).

Originally known as Kewhira, the city's history goes back to a time when it was a village of the Angami Nagas. It became an urban centre in 1878 when the British Empire established its headquarters of the then Naga Hills District of Assam Province. Kohima was the site of one of the bloodiest battles of World War II during the Japanese U-Go offensive into British India in 1944. The battle is often referred to as the Stalingrad of the East. In 2013, the British National Army Museum voted the Battle of Kohima to be Britain's Greatest Battle.

It officially became Nagaland's capital after the state was inaugurated in 1963.

== Etymology ==
Kohima was originally known as Kewhi–ra. People from different places and directions came in search of a place to settle down and formed a homogenous group that necessitated the establishment of a village. They named it Kewhira which is derived from the Angami word kephfükewhi which means to "meet and assemble together" and ra means "village" with its area jurisdiction. The people of Kewhira are called Kewhimia (mia means people) who are the indigenous inhabitants and hereditarily owned the land of Kewhira.

== History ==
=== Medieval era ===
According to oral history, the historical founder of Kewhira (Kohima Village) was Tsiera (stone defender). The village is said to be more than 700 years old and is believed to be the second largest village in Asia. The village is divided into four large clans (thinuo): Tsütuonuomia, Lhisemia, Dapfhütsumia and Pfüchatsumia (T, L, D, and P Khel respectively).

=== Colonial era ===
The East India Company Administration started to expand into Kohima beginning the 1840s. The progress made by the company armies in annexing the region continued after the Indian Rebellion of 1857, although now under the auspices of the British Indian Army. Kohima was the first seat of modern administration as the Headquarters of Naga Hills District (then under Assam Province) with the appointment of Guybon Henry Damant as Political Officer in 1879.

=== Battle of Kohima ===
In 1944 during the Second World War the Battle of Kohima along with the simultaneous Battle of Imphal was the turning point in the Burma Campaign. For the first time in South-East Asia, the Japanese lost the initiative to the Allies, which the Allies then retained until the end of the war. This hand-to-hand battle and slaughter prevented the Japanese Army from gaining a base from which they might have easily gone into the plains of India.

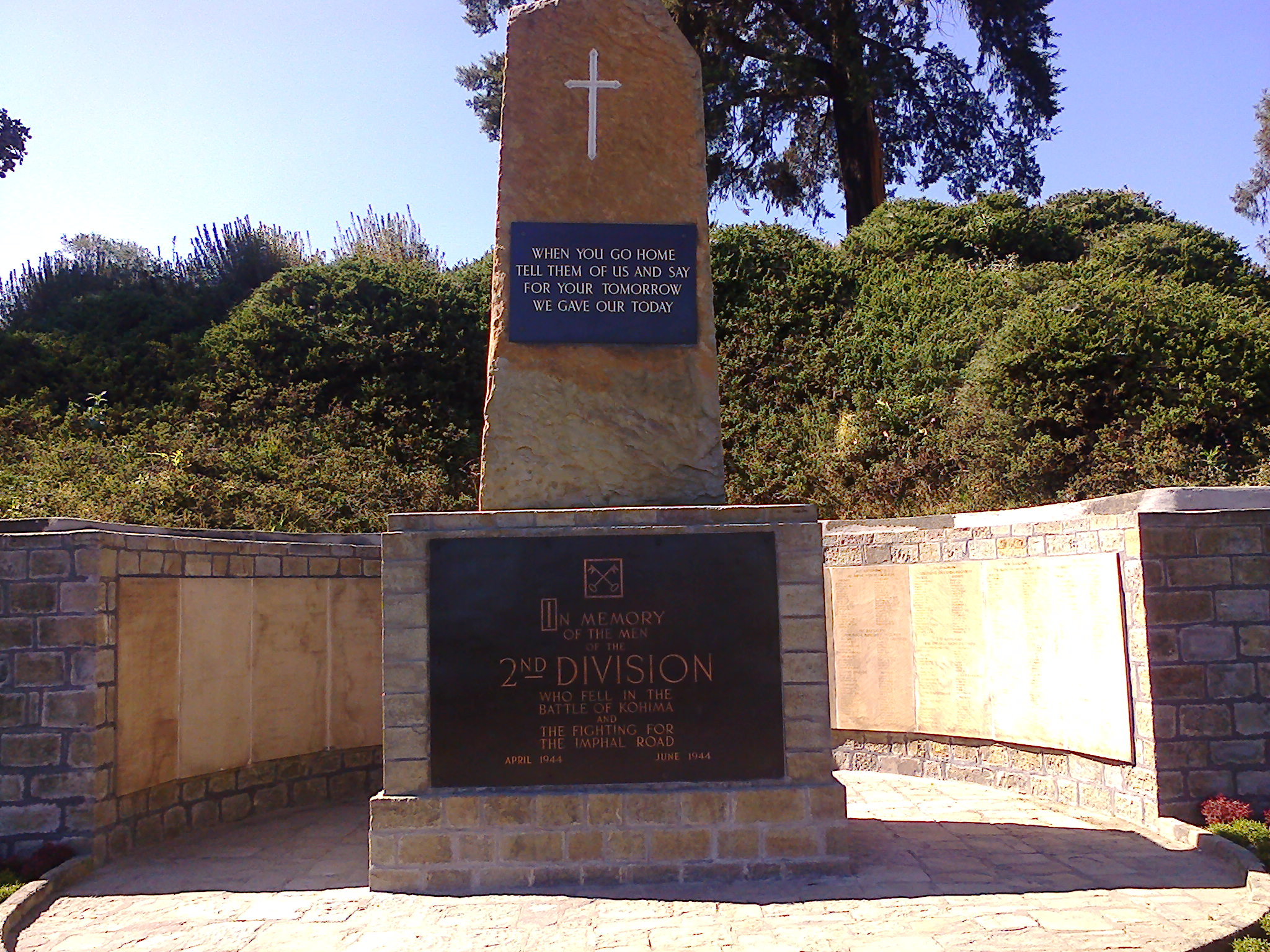
Kohima War Cemetery

Kohima has a large cemetery known as the Kohima War Cemetery for the Allied war dead; it is maintained by the Commonwealth War Graves Commission. The cemetery lies on the slopes of Garrison Hill, in what was once the Deputy Commissioner's tennis court, which was the scene of intense fighting known as the Battle of the Tennis Court. The epitaph carved on the memorial of the 2nd British Division in the cemetery has become world-famous as the Kohima poem.

When You Go Home, Tell Them of Us and Say,
For Your Tomorrow, We Gave Our Today.

The verse is attributed to John Maxwell Edmonds (1875–1958), and is thought to have been inspired by the epitaph written by Simonides to honour the Greek who fell at the Battle of Thermopylae in 480 BC.

=== 1963–present ===
When Nagaland became a full-fledged state on 1 December 1963, Kohima was named as the state capital.

==== Killings of Kekuojalie Sachü and Vikhozo Yhoshü ====
On 20 March 1986, two students Kekuojalie Sachü (19) and Vikhozo Yhoshü (14) were killed and over 50 others were injured in indiscriminate firing by Nagaland Police when they participated in a peaceful protest called by the Naga Students' Federation (NSF) to rally against the state government's decision on the introduction of Indian Police Service (IPS) cadres and the extension of the Disturbed Area Belt from 5 to 20 km along the Indo-Myanmar (Indo-Burma) border. The event was so tumultuous that it led three Cabinet ministers and five State Ministers of Nagaland to resign.

==== 1995 Kohima Massacre ====
On 5 March 1995, when a convoy of the 16th Rashtriya Rifles of the Indian Army, comprising 63 vehicles with 5 officers, 15 junior commissioned officers and approximately 400 soldiers was traversing through the densely populated AOC and BOC areas of Kohima en route from Bishnupur to Dimapur, a tyre burst from one of the convoy's own vehicle led the armed troops to mistake the sound of the tyre bursting for a bomb attack by insurgents. The troops reacted immediately and started firing at civilian populace. The firing lasted approximately 1:30 p.m. to 3:30 p.m., during which the soldiers discharged 1,207 rounds of gunfire and 5 mortal shells into civilian areas. A total of 7 were killed and 36 were left injured. Eyewitness accounts and subsequent investigations found no evidence of an actual ambush or crossfire with insurgents. The incident is widely referred to as the 1995 Kohima Massacre.

==== 2017 Nagaland protests ====
On 2 February 2017, the office building of the Kohima Municipal Council was burned down by a mob as part of the boycott of the Civic Elections. The fire significantly damaged adjoining government and private buildings. On 19 February, in response against the backdrop of widespread protests and civil unrest in the state, T. R. Zeliang announced his resignation as the Chief Minister of Nagaland.

==== 2023 Kohima fire ====
On 27 February 2023, a massive fire broke in Mao Market and NN Market, one of the biggest commercial areas in Kohima, causing complete damage to the markets.

== Geography ==
=== Topography ===
Kohima is located at 25°67' North, 94°10' East, in the southern part of Nagaland. It lies north of the Japfü–Barail intersection with Pulie Badze to the southwest overlooking the city. The hills on which Kohima is located has an elevation ranging from 1,345 to 1,560 metres (4,413 to 5,118 feet).

=== Climate ===
The city experiences a subtropical highland climate (Köppen: Cwb), with greater contrast between summer and winter than in other continents due to the monsoons but mild temperatures even for latitude and altitude. The months of June to September concentrate much of the precipitation.

Climate data for Kohima (1991–2020, extremes 1952–2020)
Month	Jan	Feb	Mar	Apr	May	Jun	Jul	Aug	Sep	Oct	Nov	Dec	Year
Record high °C (°F)	24.5 (76.1)	25.0 (77.0)	29.1 (84.4)	32.2 (90.0)	33.9 (93.0)	30.5 (86.9)	33.1 (91.6)	31.1 (88.0)	31.0 (87.8)	31.5 (88.7)	29.5 (85.1)	26.0 (78.8)	33.9 (93.0)
Mean daily maximum °C (°F)	16.1 (61.0)	19.0 (66.2)	23.5 (74.3)	25.2 (77.4)	25.1 (77.2)	26.0 (78.8)	25.8 (78.4)	26.2 (79.2)	25.6 (78.1)	24.2 (75.6)	21.8 (71.2)	17.0 (62.6)	22.8 (73.0)
Mean daily minimum °C (°F)	5.1 (41.2)	6.6 (43.9)	10.6 (51.1)	13.3 (55.9)	14.7 (58.5)	16.7 (62.1)	17.2 (63.0)	17.2 (63.0)	16.4 (61.5)	13.5 (56.3)	8.8 (47.8)	5.2 (41.4)	11.9 (53.4)
Record low °C (°F)	0.6 (33.1)	2.3 (36.1)	4.0 (39.2)	5.0 (41.0)	8.3 (46.9)	9.4 (48.9)	7.8 (46.0)	8.3 (46.9)	7.5 (45.5)	5.0 (41.0)	3.1 (37.6)	0.7 (33.3)	0.6 (33.1)
Average rainfall mm (inches)	12.1 (0.48)	28.5 (1.12)	48.6 (1.91)	100.1 (3.94)	188.5 (7.42)	248.3 (9.78)	334.7 (13.18)	344.0 (13.54)	268.2 (10.56)	125.2 (4.93)	22.9 (0.90)	6.4 (0.25)	1,727.6 (68.02)
Average rainy days	1.4	3.0	4.6	9.2	13.8	17.7	20.7	19.0	16.1	8.0	1.8	0.7	116.1
Average relative humidity (%)	74	67	65	70	77	85	88	88	86	83	76	71	78
Source: India Meteorological Department (humidity 1961-1990)

Kohima has been ranked 36th best “National Clean Air City” under (Category 3 population under 3 lakhs cities) in India.

== Environment ==
=== Water supply and availability ===
Most Wards in Kohima experiences severe water shortages during the dry seasons. The current water resources from the reservoirs of Zarü River and the streams from the slopes of Pulie Badze do not fulfill the needs of the rapidly growing population of Kohima. With the augmentation of the Zarü River project and several other upcoming water projects to be supplied from Dzüko Valley and others. The water supply is expected to cover more wards.

== Administration ==
The Kohima Town Council (KTC) was established in 1957 as the city's first local governing body with eight wards, comprising eight elected members and four government nominees. Dr. Neilhouzhu Kire served as its first Vice-Chairman, while the Deputy Commissioner of Kohima, Shri Yusuf Ali, IFAS, was the first ex-officio Chairman. In 1982, the council elected its first full-fledged Chairperson, Late Joseph Jasokie. Following the municipal elections held in December 2004, the Kohima Municipal Council (KMC) was constituted in 2005 under the provisions of the Nagaland Municipal Act, 2001. The KMC succeeded the Kohima Town Council and assumed its responsibilities, along with additional functions, including those specified in the Twelfth Schedule of the Constitution, to meet the city's growing administrative and civic requirements.It has waste management, drainage and trade licensing and other responsibilities.

Other departments of the state government, which sit in Kohima, also have a role in the administration of Kohima. The "City Development Plan" for the town, for example, was written by state Urban Development Department.

=== Wards ===
Kohima is divided into nineteen sectors with a total of thirty-three administrative wards under the authority of the Kohima Municipal Council, covering an area of about 35 km^{2} (14 sq mi). Each ward has its own council government and handles many of the functions that are handled by city governments in other jurisdictions.

- Agri Farm Ward
- Bayavü Hill Ward
- Daklane Ward
- D. Block Ward
- Dzüvürü Ward
- Electrical Ward
- Forest Ward
- Jail Ward
- Kenuozou Hill Ward
- Keziekie Ward
- Kitsübozou Ward
- Lerie Ward
- Lower Mediezie Ward
- Lower Chandmari Ward
- Lower Police Reserve Hill Ward
- Lower PWD Ward
- Merhülietsa Ward
- Middle PWD Ward
- Midland Ward
- Naga Bazaar Ward
- Naga Hospital Ward
- New Market Ward
- New Ministers' Hill Ward
- New Reserve Ward
- Old Ministers' Hill Ward
- Peraciezie Ward
- Police Reserve Hill Ward
- Sepfüzou Ward
- Thegabakha Ward
- Tsiepfü Tsiepfhe Ward
- Upper Mediezie Ward
- Upper Chandmari Ward
- Upper PWD Ward

=== Public safety ===
==== Police and law enforcement ====
The Kohima Police of the Nagaland Police is the police force responsible for maintaining security, law and order in the Kohima Metropolitan Area. It is headed by a Superintendent of Police (SP). Kevithuto Sophie is the current SP of Kohima. The municipal area of Kohima is served by two police stations—Kohima North Police Station and Kohima South Police Station.

In 2020, the Kohima North Police Station became the first police station and a government facility in the entire North Eastern Region of India to receive the International Organization for Standardization (ISO) 9001 Certification for quality management system.

== Governance ==
Nagaland's traditional governance system persists in rural areas and urban Kohima through ward panchayats. Each ward elects a panchayat chairman every five years by a show of hands, who then appoints officials, including joint secretaries and Gaon Burhas (GBs). Recognized by the District Commissioner, ward panchayats oversee peaceful community coexistence, resolve disputes, and communicate community concerns to the government. GBs manage house tax collection due to their familiarity with households. These traditional bodies are integral to development work within their wards and hold meetings as needed. Institutionalizing them under the municipal act could formalize their roles, transferring councillors' duties to panchayat chairmen and integrating them into municipal councils as ward committees. The Kohima Town Committee (KTC) was established in 1957 with 8 wards, 8 elected members, and 4 government nominees. Key pioneers include Shri Yusuf Ali as the first Ex-Officio Chairman, Late Dr. Neilhouzhu Kire as the first Vice-Chairman (1957–1967), and Late Joseph Jasokie as the first elected Chairman (1982–1983).

In 2005, Kohima's first municipality was formed under the Nagaland Municipal Act, 2001, with 19 elected councillors. The Kohima Municipal Council (KMC) remains in a transitional phase, with its powers and functions under the 74th Constitutional Amendment Act yet to be fully transferred by state government departments.

Currently, KMC governs 19 wards, covering nearly 11 sq. km (17% of the greater Kohima planning area) with a population of 98,000 as per the 2011 census.

== Demographics ==
=== Census data ===
Historical population
Year	Pop.	±%
1910	2,423	—
1920	2,790	+15.1%
1930	2,759	−1.1%
1940	3,507	+27.1%
1950	4,125	+17.6%
1960	7,246	+75.7%
1970	21,545	+197.3%
1980	34,340	+59.4%
1990	51,418	+49.7%
2000	77,030	+49.8%
2010	99,039	+28.6%
Kohima Decadal Growth:

As of 2011, Kohima had a population of 99,039 of which males and females were 51,626 and 47,413 respectively. Kohima has an average literacy rate of 90.76%, higher than the national average of 76.55%.

=== Religion ===
Religion in Kohima City (2011)
1. Christianity (80.2%)
2. Hinduism (16.1%)
3. Islam (3.06%)
4. Buddhism (0.45%)
5. Jainism (0.01%)
6. Sikhism (0.08%)
7. Others (0.05%)
8. Not stated (0.04%)

The major religion in Kohima is Christianity which is practised by 80.22% of the population. Other religions includes Hinduism (16.09%), Islam (3.06%) and Buddhism (0.45%).

== Economy ==
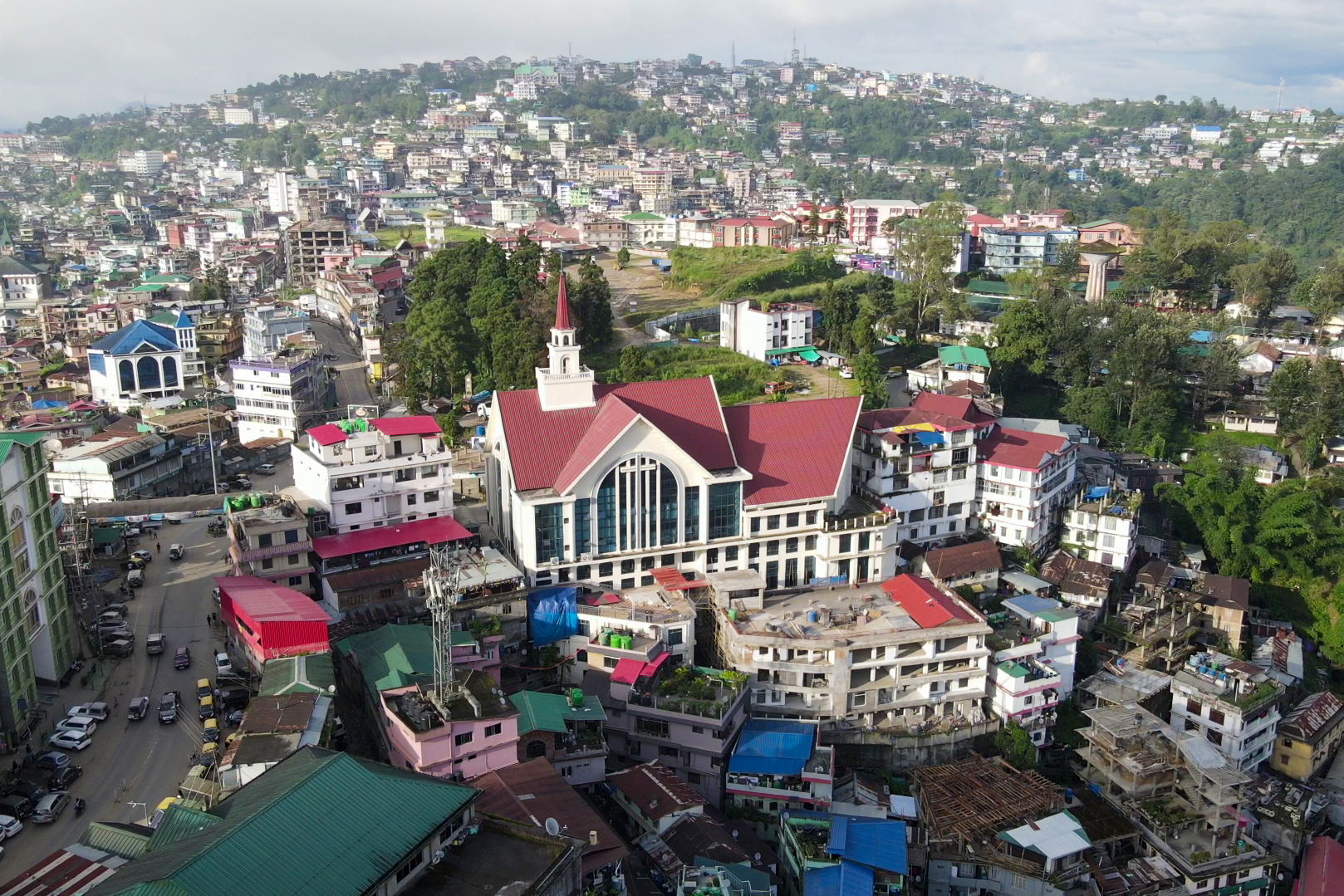
Kohima Central

=== Tourism ===
Tourism plays an important role in the city's economy. The number of tourists visiting Kohima has been increasing significantly each year.

=== Smart City and Digital Infrastructure ===
Kohima was selected as one of 100 cities under India's Smart Cities Mission in 2016 and was incorporated as Kohima Smart City Limited (KSC) under the Companies Act, 2013. Kohima became the only city from the northeastern states to be ranked in the top ten across all three major Smart Cities Mission intervention challenges — Street for People, Cycle for Change, and Nurturing Neighbourhood Challenge — and won the first season of all three categories.

The Kohima Integrated Command and Control Centre (ICCC) serves as a pan-city IoT, AI, and Internet of Everything (IoE) technology platform that manages city surveillance and traffic management, e-governance for municipal services, environment and pollution monitoring, and smart street lighting. Kohima was ranked 10th out of 100 Smart Cities in the Data Maturity Assessment Framework 2.0 and was certified as "Enabled", the highest tier, for its work on city data policy, an open data portal, and data analysis in sectors such as water, air, mobility, and disaster management.

The city's digital governance is supported by the National Informatics Centre (NIC), which hosts the Kohima district portal and provides e-governance infrastructure across government departments in the state. The Software Technology Parks of India (STPI) and the state's Department of Information Technology and Communications (DITC) have also worked to expand internet access and create an ICT ecosystem across the state, with Kohima as the administrative hub.

Kohima has also emerged as a base for private-sector cybersecurity activity in the northeastern region. NexusCipherGuard India (OPC) Private Limited, a cybersecurity firm founded in the city in December 2024, has been involved in workshops, training, and awareness programmes on digital safety for schools, colleges, and institutions across Nagaland. Its founder was among the Nagaland representatives at the National Youth Festival 2025 (Viksit Bharat Young Leaders Dialogue), where he addressed delegates on the importance of digital security in India's development. In June 2025, NexusCipherGuard India was among nine Nagaland-based startups selected to receive support under the Startup India Seed Fund Scheme. The firm also conducts cybersecurity education sessions in partnership with institutions such as ICFAI University Nagaland and has published commentary on cybersecurity challenges specific to Northeast India in regional publications including the Morung Express.

== Cityscape ==
=== Historical sites ===
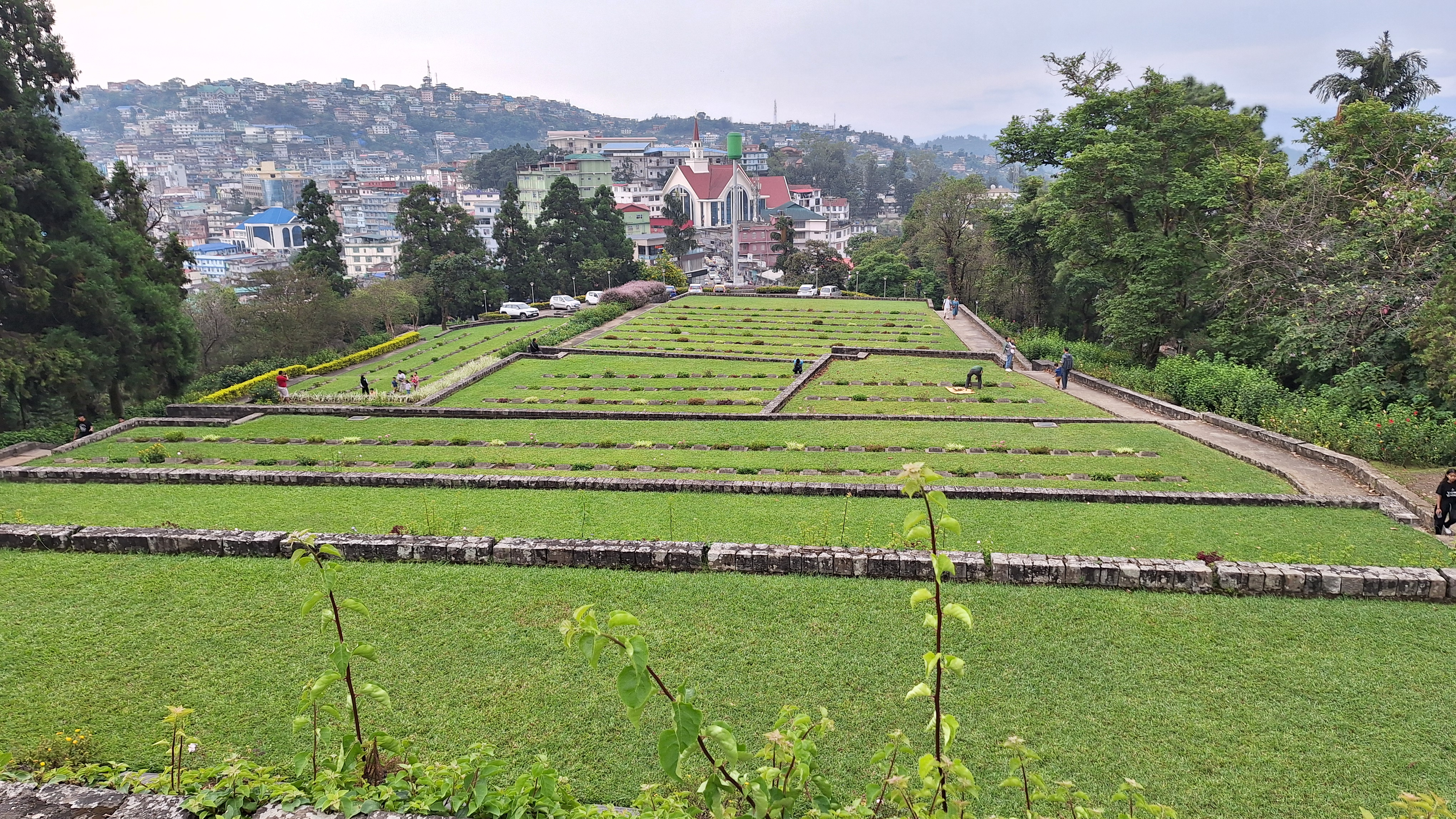
Kohima War Cemetery

- Kohima War Cemetery

Kohima War Cemetery is a memorial dedicated to soldiers of the 2nd British Division of the Allied Forces who died in the Second World War at Kohima in April 1944. There are 1,420 Commonwealth burials of the Second World War at this cemetery.

=== Parks ===
- Sakhrie Park

Sakhrie Park is a recreational park located at Middle Tsiepfü Tsiepfhe Ward (Middle AG) located between the Asian Highway 1 and the Tsiepfü Tsiepfhe Road (AG).

- Sokhriezie Park

Sokhriezie Park is a centrally-located lake that sits below the PHQ Junction.

- Kohima Botanical Garden

Kohima Botanical Garden is located at New Ministers' Hill Ward and is looked after by the Nagaland Forest Department.

== Culture ==
=== Cultural centers ===
The Kohima Capital Cultural Center is a cultural center which has a multipurpose hall that provides various facilities for its citizens. The Regional Centre of Excellence for Music & Performing Arts (RCEMPA) is a contemporary arts and music centre located in Jotsoma, about 6 km (3.7 mi) west of the city centre.

=== Events and Festivals ===
- NAJ Cosfest

The NAJ Cosfest is an Otaku-based cosplay festival held every year in the month of July. The annual event was started in 2013 and is organized by the Nagaland Anime Junkies. The cosfest is one of the biggest cosplay festivals in North East India.

- Hornbill Festival

The Hornbill Festival is the biggest annual festival in North East India. The festival is held every year from 1 to 10 December with the purpose to promote the richness of the Naga heritage and traditions. The main venue is located at the Kisama Heritage Village, located 12 km (7.5 mi) south of the city centre.

=== Fashion ===
The inhabitants of Kohima have been historically characterized as "fashion-conscious". Numerous fashion stores are located across the city and a number of fashion related events are held annually. The southern wards starting from Main Town and beyond are the most fashionable areas of Kohima.

=== Museums ===
The Nagaland State Museum is located in Bayavü Hill and displays a comprehensive collection of artefacts including ancient sculptures, traditional dresses, inscriptions of the Naga people.

=== Religious sites ===
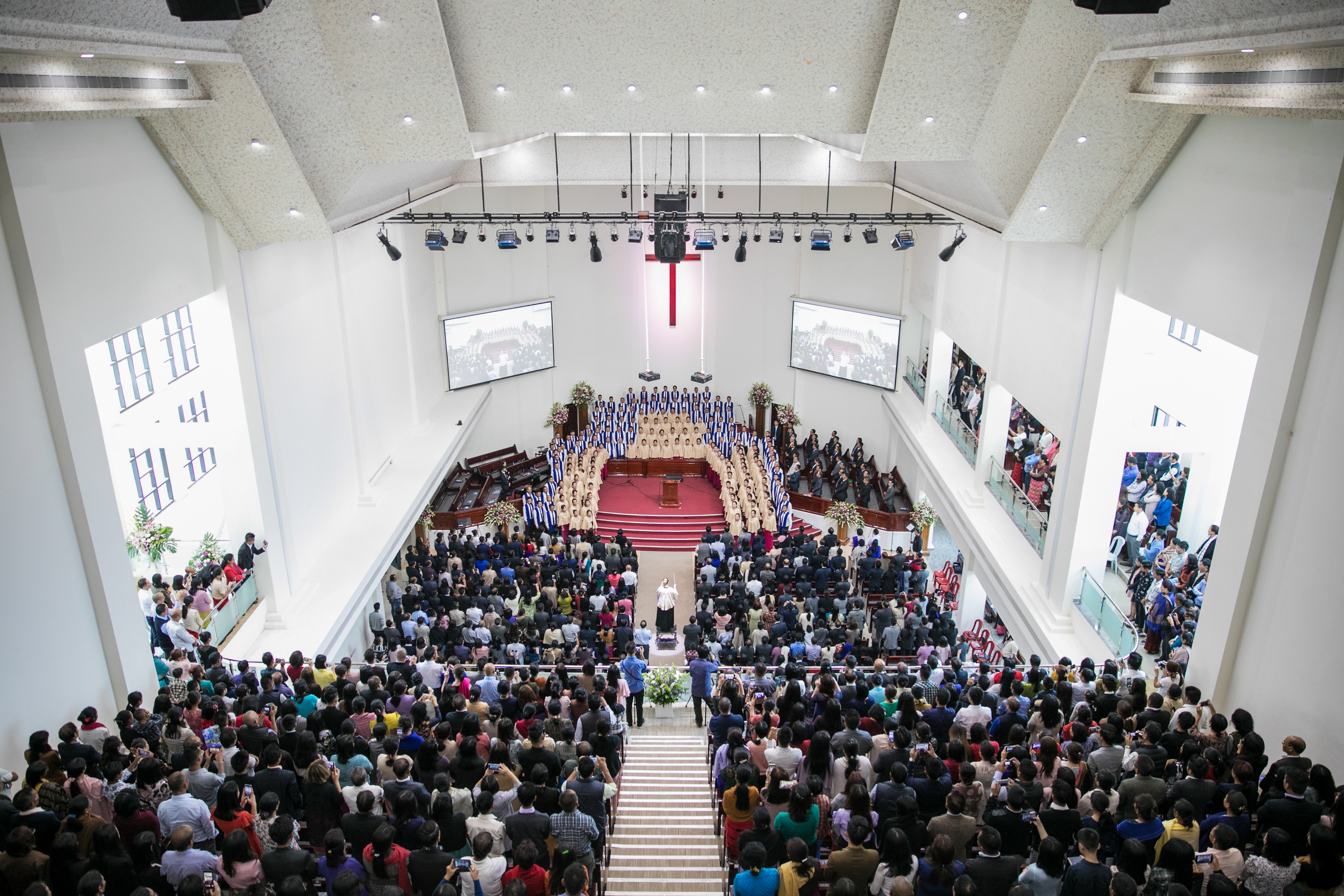
Kohima Ao Baptist Church

The Mary Help of Christians Cathedral or commonly known as the Kohima Cathedral is a prominent landmark in Kohima. The 16 feet high carved wood crucifix is one of Asia's largest crosses. It is the biggest Catholic church in Nagaland and was constructed in 1998. There are numerous Protestant churches in Kohima. Kohima Ao Baptist Church and Kohima Lotha Baptist Church are some of the biggest churches in Kohima.

The Kohima Mizo Presbyterian Church is the oldest Mizo church located outside Mizoram. The Kohima Jain Temple, the oldest Jain temple in North East India was established in 1920.

== Media ==
The most widely circulated newspapers in Kohima are The Morung Express, Nagaland Post, Eastern Mirror, Nagaland Page and the local newspaper Capi. The city was also home to the now defunct Kewhira Dielie, the first modern newspaper published from Nagaland.

Kohima is home to several television networks: Nagaland Cornerstone TV, Doordarshan Kendra Kohima which operates the DD Nagaland, etc.

State-owned All India Radio has a local station in Kohima, which transmits various programs of mass interest like AIR FM Tragopan, etc.

== Transportation ==
The major public transportation in Kohima are buses and taxis.

=== Airports ===
Kohima is served by the Dimapur Airport located in Chümoukedima–Dimapur, 74 kilometres (46 miles) from the city centre of Kohima. The currently under construction Kohima Chiethu Airport once completed will serve as the main airport for the Greater Kohima Metropolitan Area.

=== Roadways ===
Kohima is connected by road with NH 2 and NH 29 which pass through the city. The Dimapur–Kohima Highway is a tolled highway connecting Kohima with Dimapur.

==== Highways passing through Kohima ====
- Asian Highway 1: Tokyo – Kohima – Istanbul
- Asian Highway 2: Denpasar – Kohima - Khosravi
- NH 2: Dibrugarh (Assam) – Kohima – Tuipang (Mizoram)
- NH 29: Dabaka (Assam) – Kohima – Jessami (Manipur)

=== Rail ===
Kohima is not connected with the rail network. The nearest railway stations are the Chümoukedima Shokhüvi Railway Station and the Dimapur Railway Station. An extension of the railway line from Dimapur to Kohima was proposed and surveyed in 2009. Due to a dispute over land acquisition, the track was resurveyed and an alternative alignment was proposed in 2013 and is expected to be completed by 2026. Once completed the Kohima Zubza Railway Station on the Dhansiri–Zubza Line will serve as the main railway station of Kohima.

=== Cycling ===
Regardless of its hilly terrain, cycling has become an increasingly popular way to get in and around Kohima. A bicycle-sharing system was launched in September 2020.

== Education ==
As the state capital, and one of the hub on inter-state migration, the city has many educational institutions.

=== Universities and Colleges ===
- Nagaland Institute of Medical Science and Research
- Model Christian College
- Alder College
- Baptist College
- Capital College of Higher Education
- Kohima College
- Mount Olive College
- Oriental College
- Kros College
- Modern College
- Kohima Law College
- Don Bosco College

The following are major Universities and Colleges located in the Greater Kohima Metropolitan Area:

- St. Joseph's College, Jakhama
- Kohima Science College, Jotsoma
- Sazolie College, Jotsoma
- Japfü Christian College, Kigwema
- Nagaland University, Meriema Campus

=== Notable secondary schools ===
- Ministers' Hill Baptist Higher Secondary School
- Little Flower Higher Secondary School
- Mezhür Higher Secondary School
- Rüzhükhrie Government Higher Secondary School
- Fernwood School
- G. Rio School
- Dainty Buds School
- Vineyard School
- Northfield School
- Coraggio School
- Stella Higher Secondary School
- Chandmari Higher Secondary School
- Mount Sinai Higher Secondary School
- Bethel Higher Secondary School

== Sports ==
The Indira Gandhi Stadium, inaugurated in 2003 is the multipurpose stadium of the city. It includes a running track and a football field.

=== Football ===
Kohima is home to Kohima Komets, an association football club that plays in the top division Nagaland Premier League.

=== Wrestling ===
Naga wrestling enjoys widespread popularity in Kohima with people from all over Nagaland coming to witness the Naga Wrestling Championship held every two years at Khuochiezie (Kohima Local Ground). The tournament was organised in 1971.

== See also ==
- Outline of Kohima
- Municipal Wards of Kohima
- Index of Kohima-related articles
