= Kohima Municipal Council =

Local council in Nagaland, India

- 1st Kohima Municipal Council

History
- Founded: 1956

Leadership
- Chairperson: Neibodzelie Solo, Naga People's Front
- Deputy Chairperson: Thenuso-ü Sekhose, Naga People's Front
- Administrator: T. Lanusenla Longkümer

Structure
- Seats: 19
- Political groups: Nationalist Democratic Progressive Party (13) National People's Party (3) IND (3)
- Length of term: 5 years

Elections
- Voting system: First-past-the-post
- Last election: 26 June 2024
- Next election: 2029

Website
- Kohima Municipal Council

The Kohima Municipal Council is the local council of Kohima. The council has 19 members from 19 Municipal Wards.

It was initially known as Kohima Town Committee (KTC) and had eight wards and four Government nominees. Yusuf Ali was the first Ex-Officio Chairman and Dr. Neilhouzhü Kire was the first Vice-Chairman (1957–1967). In 1982, John Bosco Jasokie was elected as its first chairman. It became a Municipal Council in 2005 with 19 elected councillors. As of 2021 it is still in a transitional stage without full powers transferred.

== Current councillors ==
=== List of council members ===
The council members for the 2024–29 tenure are:

Zone	Ward Number	Ward Name	Member	Areas Covered	Assembly Constituency	Political party
	Ward 1		Kelhousenuo Khruomo			Naga People's Front
	Ward 2		Avilie Rio			Naga People's Front
	Ward 3		Ruokuovolie Rutsa			Naga People's Front
	Ward 4		Zeneivonuo Nakhro			Naga People's Front
	Ward 5		Vimhalie Pienyü			Independent
	Ward 6		Thenuso-ü Sekhose			Naga People's Front
	Ward 7		Kazheli Tungoe			Naga People's Front
	Ward 8		Thejavizo Phillip Solo			Naga People's Front
	Ward 9		Kekhrieselhou Angami			Naga People's Front
	Ward 10		Kevinei-ü Sekhose			Independent
	Ward 11		Neibodzelie Solo			Naga People's Front
	Ward 12		Ahelie Theyo			Independent
	Ward 13		K. Asangla Jamir			Naga People's Front
	Ward 14		Vizokhoto George Kirha			Naga People's Front
	Ward 15		Ketousie Khamo			Naga People's Front
	Ward 16		Ane-ü Khaming			National People's Party
	Ward 17		Khrielievi Chüsi			Naga People's Front
	Ward 18		Neikhozo Suokhrie			Naga People's Front
	Ward 19		Medoviu Martin Suohu			Naga People's Front
