= List of villages in Nagaland =

As of 2021, there are 1280 recognised villages, 75 unrecognised villages and 111 hamlets in the Indian state of Nagaland. The following is a list of recognised villages in Nagaland:

== Chümoukedima District ==
Chümoukedima District has a total of 82 recognised villages. They are:

Division	Villages
Dhansiripar (SDO (C))	Amaluma
Dhansiripar (SDO (C))	Chen Village
Dhansiripar (SDO (C))	Daniel
Dhansiripar (SDO (C))	Dhansiripar
Dhansiripar (SDO (C))	Disagaphu
Dhansiripar (SDO (C))	Doyapur
Dhansiripar (SDO (C))	Ganeshnagar
Dhansiripar (SDO (C))	Ghowoto
Dhansiripar (SDO (C))	Hazadisa
Dhansiripar (SDO (C))	K. Xekiye
Dhansiripar (SDO (C))	Khekiho
Dhansiripar (SDO (C))	Khiamnok
Dhansiripar (SDO (C))	Kiyevi
Dhansiripar (SDO (C))	Kiyeto
Dhansiripar (SDO (C))	Lhothavi
Dhansiripar (SDO (C))	Manglumukh
Dhansiripar (SDO (C))	Melongmen
Dhansiripar (SDO (C))	Pimla
Dhansiripar (SDO (C))	Razhaphe
Dhansiripar (SDO (C))	Razhaphe Basa
Dhansiripar (SDO (C))	Shikavi
Dhansiripar (SDO (C))	Shitovi
Dhansiripar (SDO (C))	Toshezu
Dhansiripar (SDO (C))	Zutovi
Medziphema (ADC)	Bungsang
Medziphema (ADC)	Hekheshe
Medziphema (ADC)	Khaibung
Medziphema (ADC)	Kukidolong
Medziphema (ADC)	Kupuhe
Medziphema (ADC)	Medziphema Village
Medziphema (ADC)	Maova
Medziphema (ADC)	Molvom
Medziphema (ADC)	New Chümoukedima
Medziphema (ADC)	New Medziphema
Medziphema (ADC)	New Socünoma
Medziphema (ADC)	Pherima
Medziphema (ADC)	Piphema 'A'
Medziphema (ADC)	Piphema New
Medziphema (ADC)	Piphema Old
Medziphema (ADC)	Rüzaphema
Medziphema (ADC)	Sirhi Angami
Medziphema (ADC)	Sirhima
Medziphema (ADC)	Tsiepama
Medziphema (ADC)	Tsiepama Model
Medziphema (ADC)	Tsüüma
Medziphema (ADC)	Zhuikhu
Seithekema (EAC)	5th Mile Model
Seithekema (EAC)	7th Mile Model
Seithekema (EAC)	Aoyim
Seithekema (EAC)	Bade
Seithekema (EAC)	Chekiye
Seithekema (EAC)	Chümoukedima Village
Seithekema (EAC)	Chümoukedima 'A'
Seithekema (EAC)	Diezephe
Seithekema (EAC)	Diphupar
Seithekema (EAC)	Diphupar 'B'
Seithekema (EAC)	Ikishe
Seithekema (EAC)	Khopanala
Seithekema (EAC)	Khriezephe
Seithekema (EAC)	Kirha
Seithekema (EAC)	Kozabe
Seithekema (EAC)	Mürise
Seithekema (EAC)	Naga United
Seithekema (EAC)	Seitheke 'A'
Seithekema (EAC)	Seitheke 'B'
Seithekema (EAC)	Seitheke 'C'
Seithekema (EAC)	Seitheke Old
Seithekema (EAC)	Seluophe
Seithekema (EAC)	Shokhüvi
Seithekema (EAC)	Singrijan
Seithekema (EAC)	Sodzülhou
Seithekema (EAC)	Sovima
Seithekema (EAC)	Tenyiphe-I
Seithekema (EAC)	Tenyiphe-II
Seithekema (EAC)	Thilixü
Seithekema (EAC)	Tir
Seithekema (EAC)	Toulazouma
Seithekema (EAC)	Tsithrongse
Seithekema (EAC)	Unity
Seithekema (EAC)	Urra
Seithekema (EAC)	Vidima
Seithekema (EAC)	Virazouma

== Dimapur District ==
Dimapur District has a total of 31 recognised villages. They are:

Division	Villages
Dimapur (DC Sadar)	Ao Yimküm
Dimapur (DC Sadar)	Aoyimti
Dimapur (DC Sadar)	Bamunpukhri 'A'
Dimapur (DC Sadar)	Bamunpukhuri 'B'
Dimapur (DC Sadar)	Darogapathar
Dimapur (DC Sadar)	Dikoi
Dimapur (DC Sadar)	Doragajan
Dimapur (DC Sadar)	Doshehe
Dimapur (DC Sadar)	Dubagaon
Dimapur (DC Sadar)	Ekaranipathar
Dimapur (DC Sadar)	Ekhyo Yan (Domukhia)
Dimapur (DC Sadar)	Eralibill
Dimapur (DC Sadar)	Indisen
Dimapur (DC Sadar)	Industrial Village Razhüphe (IVR)
Dimapur (DC Sadar)	Kashiram
Dimapur (DC Sadar)	Khushiabill
Dimapur (DC Sadar)	Kuda
Dimapur (DC Sadar)	L. Hotovi
Dimapur (DC Sadar)	Padam Pukhri
Dimapur (DC Sadar)	Phaipijang
Dimapur (DC Sadar)	Phevima
Dimapur (DC Sadar)	Purana Bazar 'B'
Dimapur (DC Sadar)	Rilan
Dimapur (DC Sadar)	Samaguri
Dimapur (DC Sadar)	Sangtamtilla
Dimapur (DC Sadar)	Senjüm
Dimapur (DC Sadar)	Shozukhü
Dimapur (DC Sadar)	Signal Angami
Dimapur (DC Sadar)	Thahekhü
Dimapur (DC Sadar)	Toluvi
Dimapur (DC Sadar)	Zani

== Kiphire District ==
Kiphire District has a total of 103 recognised villages. They are:

Division	Villages
Amahator (EAC)	Amahator
Amahator (EAC)	Bilongkyu
Amahator (EAC)	Changchor
Amahator (EAC)	Hurong
Amahator (EAC)	Keor
Amahator (EAC)	Kisetong
Amahator (EAC)	New Risethsi
Amahator (EAC)	Old Risethsi
Amahator (EAC)	Yingshukur
Khongsa (EAC)	Fakim
Khongsa (EAC)	Khong
Khongsa (EAC)	Khongsa
Khongsa (EAC)	Penkim
Khongsa (EAC)	Salomi
Khongsa (EAC)	Thanamir
Khongsa (EAC)	Threntsuvong
Khongsa (EAC)	Tsundang
Khongsa (EAC)	Vongtsuvong
Kiphire (DC Sadar)	Kiphire Village
Kiphire (DC Sadar)	Langkok
Kiphire (DC Sadar)	Lihtsaoung
Kiphire (DC Sadar)	Longthonger
Kiphire (DC Sadar)	Okhe
Kiphire (DC Sadar)	Phelungre
Kiphire (DC Sadar)	Singrep
Kiusam (EAC)	Chikiuponger
Kiusam (EAC)	Ditanvong
Kiusam (EAC)	Kiusam
Kiusam (EAC)	Kiusisu
Kiusam (EAC)	Latsu
Kiusam (EAC)	Limtsang
Kiusam (EAC)	Longtsunger
Kiusam (EAC)	Metonger
Kiusam (EAC)	Pokphur
Kiusam (EAC)	Reichem
Kiusam (EAC)	Sangkhumti
Kiusam (EAC)	Sangtsung
Kiusam (EAC)	Tukiavong
Kiusam (EAC)	Vitsuvong
Longmatra (EAC)	Aso
Longmatra (EAC)	Azetso
Longmatra (EAC)	Longmatra
Longmatra (EAC)	New Longmatra
Longmatra (EAC)	Ngoromi
Longmatra (EAC)	Pongren
Longmatra (EAC)	Samphure
Longmatra (EAC)	Sangtsoze
Longmatra (EAC)	Tethuze
Longmatra (EAC)	Tsongphong
Longmatra (EAC)	Tutheyo
Pungro (ADC)	Amikioro
Pungro (ADC)	Betang
Pungro (ADC)	Hakumati
Pungro (ADC)	Iponger
Pungro (ADC)	Jenty
Pungro (ADC)	Khaha
Pungro (ADC)	Khongjiri
Pungro (ADC)	Khongka
Pungro (ADC)	Kiuro
Pungro (ADC)	Ledeyevong
Pungro (ADC)	Longkhimvong
Pungro (ADC)	Lopfukhong
Pungro (ADC)	Luthur
Pungro (ADC)	Mimi
Pungro (ADC)	Mongtsu
Pungro (ADC)	Moya
Pungro (ADC)	Mutingkhong
Pungro (ADC)	New Vongti
Pungro (ADC)	Old Vongti
Pungro (ADC)	Phuvkiu
Pungro (ADC)	Pungro
Pungro (ADC)	Throngkim
Pungro (ADC)	Thulun
Pungro (ADC)	Tikenvong
Pungro (ADC)	Tsurevong
Pungro (ADC)	Tsutowong
Pungro (ADC)	Vongva
Pungro (ADC)	Zaonger
Pungro (ADC)	Zhimkiur
Seyochung (ADC)	Longbeakru
Seyochung (ADC)	Lukhami
Seyochung (ADC)	New Monger
Seyochung (ADC)	Old Monger
Seyochung (ADC)	Phisami
Seyochung (ADC)	Seyochung
Seyochung (ADC)	Shothumi 'A'
Seyochung (ADC)	Shothumi 'B'
Seyochung (ADC)	Thangthur
Seyochung (ADC)	Thsingar
Seyochung (ADC)	Yangzitong
Seyochung (ADC)	Yingphire
Sitimi (EAC)	Honito
Sitimi (EAC)	Ighoto
Sitimi (EAC)	Kiyezhe
Sitimi (EAC)	Langzanger
Sitimi (EAC)	Natsami
Sitimi (EAC)	Nikiye
Sitimi (EAC)	Nitoi
Sitimi (EAC)	Shishimi
Sitimi (EAC)	Sitimi
Sitimi (EAC)	Thazuvi
Sitimi (EAC)	Xuvishe
Sitimi (EAC)	Yangsekyu

== Kohima District ==
Kohima District has a total of 58 recognised villages. They are:

Division	Villages
Botsa (EAC)	Botsa
Botsa (EAC)	Gariphe Basa
Botsa (EAC)	Gariphema
Botsa (EAC)	Seiyhama
Botsa (EAC)	Seiyha Phesa
Botsa (EAC)	Teichüma
Botsa (EAC)	Tsiemekhu Basa
Botsa (EAC)	Tsiemekhuma Bawe
Botsa (EAC)	Tuophema
Botsa (EAC)	Tuophe Phezou
Chiephobozou (ADC)	Chiechama
Chiephobozou (ADC)	Meriema
Chiephobozou (ADC)	Nachama
Chiephobozou (ADC)	Nerhe Phezha
Chiephobozou (ADC)	Nerhema
Chiephobozou (ADC)	Nerhema Model
Chiephobozou (ADC)	Phekerkriema
Chiephobozou (ADC)	Phekerkriema Basa
Chiephobozou (ADC)	Rüsoma
Chiephobozou (ADC)	Thizama
Chiephobozou (ADC)	Tsabozou
Chiephobozou (ADC)	Tsiesema
Chiephobozou (ADC)	Tsiese Basa
Chiephobozou (ADC)	Viphoma
Chiephobozou (ADC)	Zhadima
Chiephobozou (ADC)	Ziezou
Jakhama (SDO(C))	Jakhama
Jakhama (SDO(C))	Khuzama
Jakhama (SDO(C))	Kigwema
Jakhama (SDO(C))	Mima
Jakhama (SDO(C))	Pfüchama
Jakhama (SDO(C))	Phesama
Jakhama (SDO(C))	Viswema
Kezocha (EAC)	Dihoma
Kezocha (EAC)	Kezo Basa
Kezocha (EAC)	Kezoma
Kezocha (EAC)	Kidima
Kezocha (EAC)	Kijümetuoma Basa
Kezocha (EAC)	Kijümetuoma
Kezocha (EAC)	Mitelephe
Kezocha (EAC)	Sakhabama
Kohima (DC Sadar)	Chedema
Kohima (DC Sadar)	Chede Model Village
Kohima (DC Sadar)	Kohima Village
Sechü Zubza (SDO(C))	Dzüdza
Sechü Zubza (SDO(C))	Dzüleke
Sechü Zubza (SDO(C))	Jotsoma
Sechü Zubza (SDO(C))	Khonoma
Sechü Zubza (SDO(C))	Khonoma Basa
Sechü Zubza (SDO(C))	Kiruphema Basa
Sechü Zubza (SDO(C))	Kiruphema Bawe
Sechü Zubza (SDO(C))	Mengujüma
Sechü Zubza (SDO(C))	Mezo Basa
Sechü Zubza (SDO(C))	Mezoma
Sechü Zubza (SDO(C))	Peducha
Sechü Zubza (SDO(C))	Sechü Zubza
Sechü Zubza (SDO(C))	Sechüma
Sechü Zubza (SDO(C))	Thekrejüma

== Longleng District ==
Longleng District has a total of 51 recognised villages. They are:

Division	Villages
Longleng (DC Sadar)	Bhumnyu
Longleng (DC Sadar)	Dungkhao
Longleng (DC Sadar)	Hamlikong
Longleng (DC Sadar)	Hukphang
Longleng (DC Sadar)	Lingtak
Longleng (DC Sadar)	Meyangkhang
Longleng (DC Sadar)	Mongkhong
Longleng (DC Sadar)	Mongtikang
Longleng (DC Sadar)	Oukshok
Longleng (DC Sadar)	Oulam
Longleng (DC Sadar)	Orangkong
Longleng (DC Sadar)	Pongching
Tamlu (ADC)	Ametchong
Tamlu (ADC)	Kangching
Tamlu (ADC)	Netnyu
Tamlu (ADC)	Tamlu
Namsang (EAC)	Apoiji
Namsang (EAC)	Bura Namsang
Namsang (EAC)	Ladigarh
Namsang (EAC)	Namhaching
Namsang (EAC)	Ngetchongching
Namsang (EAC)	Shamnyuching
Namsang (EAC)	Shetap
Namsang (EAC)	Yonglok
Sakshi (EAC)	Auching
Sakshi (EAC)	Hongnyu
Sakshi (EAC)	Mungkhu
Sakshi (EAC)	Pongo
Sakshi (EAC)	Sakshi
Sakshi (EAC)	Yangching
Sakshi (EAC)	Yimchong
Sakshi (EAC)	Yongphang
Sakshi (EAC)	Yongsham
Yachem (EAC)	Alayong
Yachem (EAC)	Noksosang
Yachem (EAC)	Sanglu
Yachem (EAC)	Toiching
Yachem (EAC)	Yachem
Yachem (EAC)	Yaongyimchen
Yongnyah (EAC)	Amosen
Yongnyah (EAC)	Chingong
Yongnyah (EAC)	Chingshang
Yongnyah (EAC)	Chingtok Village
Yongnyah (EAC)	Mechong
Yongnyah (EAC)	Nyang
Yongnyah (EAC)	Shamshang
Yongnyah (EAC)	Tangha
Yongnyah (EAC)	Yongam
Yongnyah (EAC)	Yongnyah
Yongnyah (EAC)	Yongshei
Yongnyah (EAC)	Yungja

== Meluri District ==
Meluri District has a total of 31 recognised villages. They are:

Division	Villages
Lephory (EAC)	Akhen
Lephory (EAC)	Kanjang
Lephory (EAC)	Lephori
Lephory (EAC)	Matikhrü
Lephory (EAC)	Mollen
Lephory (EAC)	Reguri
Meluri (DC Sadar)	Akhegwo
Meluri (DC Sadar)	Khumiasu
Meluri (DC Sadar)	Kukhegwo
Meluri (DC Sadar)	Meluri
Meluri (DC Sadar)	New Akhegwo
Meluri (DC Sadar)	Riehuope
Phokhungri (EAC)	Avankhung
Phokhungri (EAC)	Laruri
Phokhungri (EAC)	Letsam
Phokhungri (EAC)	Mokie
Phokhungri (EAC)	New Thewati
Phokhungri (EAC)	Old Thewati
Phokhungri (EAC)	Phokrungri
Phokhungri (EAC)	Sütsü
Phokhungri (EAC)	Washelo
Phokhungri (EAC)	Zhipu
Phor (EAC)	Hutsü
Phor (EAC)	Küzatü
Phor (EAC)	New Phor
Phor (EAC)	Phor
Phor (EAC)	Shatüza
Phor (EAC)	Weziho
Phor (EAC)	Wuzu
Phor (EAC)	Yesisotha
Phor (EAC)	Yisi

== Mokokchung District ==
Mokokchung District has a total of 88 recognised villages.

Division	Villages
Alongkima (EAC)	Dibuia
Alongkima (EAC)	Luyong
Alongkima (EAC)	Molungkimong
Alongkima (EAC)	Molungyimsen
Alongkima (EAC)	Mongchen
Alongkima (EAC)	Waromung
Alongkima (EAC)	Yimjenkimong
Changtongya (SDO(C))	Akhoya
Changtongya (SDO(C))	Changtongya
Changtongya (SDO(C))	Changtongya Yimsen
Changtongya (SDO(C))	Kelingmen
Changtongya (SDO(C))	Liroyim
Changtongya (SDO(C))	Nukshiyim
Changtongya (SDO(C))	Unger
Changtongya (SDO(C))	Yaongyimsen
Chuchuyimlang (EAC)	Chakpa
Chuchuyimlang (EAC)	Chuchuyimlang
Chuchuyimlang (EAC)	Longkong
Chuchuyimlang (EAC)	Mongsenyimti
Chuchuyimlang (EAC)	Salulamang
Chuchuyimlang (EAC)	Yaongyimti New
Chuchuyimlang (EAC)	Yaongyimti Old
Kubolong (EAC)	Chami
Kubolong (EAC)	Khanimu
Kubolong (EAC)	Longjang
Kubolong (EAC)	Longpa
Kubolong (EAC)	Mopungchuket
Kubolong (EAC)	Sungratsu
Kubolong (EAC)	Yimchalu
Longchem (EAC)	Akumen
Longchem (EAC)	Alongtaki
Longchem (EAC)	Aonokpu
Longchem (EAC)	Changdang
Longchem (EAC)	Lakhuni
Longchem (EAC)	Lirmen
Longchem (EAC)	Lizo Model
Longchem (EAC)	Nokpu
Longchem (EAC)	Saringyim
Longchem (EAC)	Tsüremmen
Longchem (EAC)	Yajang 'A'
Longchem (EAC)	Yajang 'B'
Longchem (EAC)	Yajang 'C'
Mangkolemba (ADC)	Atuphumi
Mangkolemba (ADC)	Changki
Mangkolemba (ADC)	Chungliyimsen
Mangkolemba (ADC)	Japu
Mangkolemba (ADC)	Khar
Mangkolemba (ADC)	Longjemdang
Mangkolemba (ADC)	Merayim
Mangkolemba (ADC)	Satsukba
Mangkolemba (ADC)	Shihaphumi
Merangmen (EAC)	Aokum
Merangmen (EAC)	Aosenden
Merangmen (EAC)	Aosungkum
Merangmen (EAC)	Chungtiayimsen
Merangmen (EAC)	Longpayimsen
Merangmen (EAC)	Medemyim
Merangmen (EAC)	Moayimti
Merangmen (EAC)	Vikuto
Merangmen (EAC)	Watiyim
Ongpangkong (EAC)	Aliba
Ongpangkong (EAC)	Chubayimkum
Ongpangkong (EAC)	Chuchuyimpang
Ongpangkong (EAC)	Chungtia
Ongpangkong (EAC)	Khensa
Ongpangkong (EAC)	Kinunger
Ongpangkong (EAC)	Kubza
Ongpangkong (EAC)	Longkhüm
Ongpangkong (EAC)	Longmisa
Ongpangkong (EAC)	Longsa
Ongpangkong (EAC)	Mangmetong
Ongpangkong (EAC)	Mekuli
Ongpangkong (EAC)	Meyilong
Ongpangkong (EAC)	Moalenden
Ongpangkong (EAC)	Mokokchung Village
Ongpangkong (EAC)	Satsu
Ongpangkong (EAC)	Settsu
Ongpangkong (EAC)	Ungma
Tuli (ADC)	Anaki
Tuli (ADC)	Anaki 'C'
Tuli (ADC)	Anakiyimsen
Tuli (ADC)	Aopenzu
Tuli (ADC)	Asangma
Tuli (ADC)	Chubarongpang
Tuli (ADC)	Kangtsung
Tuli (ADC)	Kantsungyimsen
Tuli (ADC)	Merangkong
Tuli (ADC)	Wameken

== Mon District ==
Mon District has a total of 145 recognised villages. They are:

Division	Villages
Aboi (ADC)	Aopao
Aboi (ADC)	Aopao Changle
Aboi (ADC)	Chaoha Chingha
Aboi (ADC)	Chaoha Chinglen
Aboi (ADC)	Chaoha Chingnyu
Aboi (ADC)	Chinglong
Aboi (ADC)	Langmeing
Aboi (ADC)	Ngangching
Aboi (ADC)	Yoonchung
Angjangyang (SDO(C))	Angjangyang
Angjangyang (SDO(C))	Angphang
Angjangyang (SDO(C))	Changlang
Angjangyang (SDO(C))	Jakphang
Angjangyang (SDO(C))	Jakphang Hongha
Chen (SDO(C))	Chenloisho
Chen (SDO(C))	Chenloisho Longkhao
Chen (SDO(C))	Chenloisho Wangto
Chen (SDO(C))	Chenmoho
Chen (SDO(C))	Chenmoho Chinglen
Chen (SDO(C))	Chenwetnyu
Chen (SDO(C))	Chingkhao Chingha
Chen (SDO(C))	Chingkhao Chingnyu
Chen (SDO(C))	Chingkhao Chingpong
Chen (SDO(C))	Chingkhao Nyaho
Chen (SDO(C))	Chingkao Pangkhao
Chen (SDO(C))	Chohzu (Choknyu)
Chen (SDO(C))	Wangti
Hunta (EAC)	Jaboka
Hunta (EAC)	Loakho
Hunta (EAC)	Longting
Hunta (EAC)	Neitong
Hunta (EAC)	Nokyan
Hunta (EAC)	Nokzang
Hunta (EAC)	Old Jaboka
Hunta (EAC)	Yannyu
Longching (EAC)	L/Hongnyu
Longching (EAC)	Longching
Longching (EAC)	Mohung
Longching (EAC)	Mohung Changai
Longching (EAC)	Sowa
Longching (EAC)	Sowa Changle
Longshen (EAC)	Sheanghah Chingnyu
Longshen (EAC)	Sheanghah Lokyo
Longshen (EAC)	Sheanghah Mokok
Longshen (EAC)	Sheanghah Tangten
Longshen (EAC)	Sheanghah Wamsa
Longshen (EAC)	Tangnyu
Longshen (EAC)	Yuching
Mon (DC Sadar)	Amahong
Mon (DC Sadar)	Chi
Mon (DC Sadar)	Goching
Mon (DC Sadar)	Hongphoi
Mon (DC Sadar)	Lampong Sheanghah
Mon (DC Sadar)	Leangha
Mon (DC Sadar)	Leangnyu
Mon (DC Sadar)	Longkei
Mon (DC Sadar)	Mon Village
Mon (DC Sadar)	Oting
Mon (DC Sadar)	Phuktong
Mon (DC Sadar)	Pongkong
Mon (DC Sadar)	Tammong
Mon (DC Sadar)	Totok Chingha
Mon (DC Sadar)	Totok Chingkho
Mon (DC Sadar)	Totok Chinglen
Mon (DC Sadar)	Totok Chingnyu
Mon (DC Sadar)	Totok Omlen
Mon (DC Sadar)	Tuimei
Mon (DC Sadar)	Wangla
Monyakshu (SDO(C))	Bumei
Monyakshu (SDO(C))	Changlangshu
Monyakshu (SDO(C))	Changlangshu Changsha
Monyakshu (SDO(C))	Changlu
Monyakshu (SDO(C))	Meinhangle
Monyakshu (SDO(C))	Monyakshu
Monyakshu (SDO(C))	Pessao
Monyakshu (SDO(C))	Shinnyu
Monyakshu (SDO(C))	Yongkhao
Monyakshu (SDO(C))	Yongkhao Changlu
Mopong (EAC)	Angchen
Mopong (EAC)	Changkong
Mopong (EAC)	Ukha
Mopong (EAC)	Ukha Lampong
Mopong (EAC)	Y/ Changnyu
Mopong (EAC)	Y/ Kenchenshu
Mopong (EAC)	Yaphang
Mopong (EAC)	Yakshu
Mopong (EAC)	Yei
Mopong (EAC)	Yonghong
Naginimora (ADC)	Hotahoti
Naginimora (ADC)	Kongan
Naginimora (ADC)	Lower Tiru
Naginimora (ADC)	Maoting
Naginimora (ADC)	Namthai
Naginimora (ADC)	Upper Tiru
Phomching (SDO(C))	Lungwa
Phomching (SDO(C))	Lungwa Wasa
Phomching (SDO(C))	Longzang
Phomching (SDO(C))	Nyahnyu
Phomching (SDO(C))	Pukha
Phomching (SDO(C))	Wetting
Shangnyu (EAC)	Longphoah
Shangnyu (EAC)	Nyasa
Shangnyu (EAC)	Shangnyu
Shangnyu (EAC)	Zangkham
Shangnyu (EAC)	Zangkham Tingsa
Tizit (ADC)	Lapa
Tizit (ADC)	Loakkun
Tizit (ADC)	Longlem
Tizit (ADC)	Nangtan
Tizit (ADC)	Ngangting
Tizit (ADC)	Shangsa
Tizit (ADC)	Tela
Tizit (ADC)	Tingalibam
Tizit (ADC)	Tizit
Tizit (ADC)	Yanpan
Tizit (ADC)	Zakho
Tobu (ADC)	Eyeang
Tobu (ADC)	New Tobu
Tobu (ADC)	Tamkoang
Tobu (ADC)	Tangkhao
Tobu (ADC)	Tobu
Tobu (ADC)	Wangshu
Tobu (ADC)	Wangshu Changlu
Tobu (ADC)	Wangshu Ngothung
Tobu (ADC)	Yeangmei
Wakching (SDO(C))	Chingdang
Wakching (SDO(C))	Chingphoi
Wakching (SDO(C))	Jumei
Wakching (SDO(C))	Lampong Wakching
Wakching (SDO(C))	Shiyong
Wakching (SDO(C))	Tanhai
Wakching (SDO(C))	Wakching
Wakching (SDO(C))	Wakching Chingla
Wakching (SDO(C))	Wanching
Wakching (SDO(C))	Wanching Yongmuoh

== Niuland District ==
Niuland District has a total of 103 recognised villages. They are:

Division	Villages
Aghunaqa (EAC)	Ahoto
Aghunaqa (EAC)	Aoyimchen
Aghunaqa (EAC)	Ghoshito
Aghunaqa (EAC)	Hevuxu
Aghunaqa (EAC)	Homeland
Aghunaqa (EAC)	Hozheto
Aghunaqa (EAC)	Hukhai
Aghunaqa (EAC)	Husto
Aghunaqa (EAC)	Izhevi
Aghunaqa (EAC)	Kikheyi
Aghunaqa (EAC)	Khehuto
Aghunaqa (EAC)	Khutovi
Aghunaqa (EAC)	Luhevi
Aghunaqa (EAC)	Luhezhe
Aghunaqa (EAC)	L. Vihoto
Aghunaqa (EAC)	Mughavi
Aghunaqa (EAC)	Ngamjalam
Aghunaqa (EAC)	Nguvihe
Aghunaqa (EAC)	Nikihe
Aghunaqa (EAC)	Nikiqhe
Aghunaqa (EAC)	Nitozu
Aghunaqa (EAC)	Nizheto
Aghunaqa (EAC)	Pihekhu
Aghunaqa (EAC)	P. Vihoto
Aghunaqa (EAC)	Qhuhoi
Aghunaqa (EAC)	R. Hovishe
Aghunaqa (EAC)	Shiwoto
Aghunaqa (EAC)	Shokhevi
Aghunaqa (EAC)	Tohoi
Aghunaqa (EAC)	Tohokhu
Aghunaqa (EAC)	Tokishe
Aghunaqa (EAC)	Vikheto
Aghunaqa (EAC)	Xukhuvi
Aghunaqa (EAC)	Yetoho
Aghunaqa (EAC)	Zhekishe
Aghunaqa (EAC)	Zhexuche
Aghunaqa (EAC)	Zutoi
Kuhuboto (SDO(C))	Ahozhe
Kuhuboto (SDO(C))	Ghokito
Kuhuboto (SDO(C))	Henivi
Kuhuboto (SDO(C))	Hoito
Kuhuboto (SDO(C))	Hukato
Kuhuboto (SDO(C))	Keyezhe
Kuhuboto (SDO(C))	Khehokhu
Kuhuboto (SDO(C))	Khughovi
Kuhuboto (SDO(C))	Kughato
Kuhuboto (SDO(C))	Lotovi
Kuhuboto (SDO(C))	Luzheto
Kuhuboto (SDO(C))	Nihoto
Kuhuboto (SDO(C))	Nizhevi
Kuhuboto (SDO(C))	Old Showuba
Kuhuboto (SDO(C))	Pukhato
Kuhuboto (SDO(C))	S. Hotovi
Kuhuboto (SDO(C))	Suhoi
Kuhuboto (SDO(C))	Tokugha
Kuhuboto (SDO(C))	Vihokhu
Kuhuboto (SDO(C))	Vikuho
Kuhuboto (SDO(C))	Xekiye
Kuhuboto (SDO(C))	Xelhozhe
Kuhuboto (SDO(C))	Zuvukhu
Nihokhu (EAC)	Ghokuto
Nihokhu (EAC)	Hokhe
Nihokhu (EAC)	Hozukhe
Nihokhu (EAC)	Khehoyi
Nihokhu (EAC)	New Showuba
Nihokhu (EAC)	Nihokhu
Nihokhu (EAC)	Nikhekhu
Nihokhu (EAC)	S. Hetoi
Nihokhu (EAC)	Sukhato
Nihokhu (EAC)	Toshiho
Niuland (DC Sadar)	Akito
Niuland (DC Sadar)	Ghonivi
Niuland (DC Sadar)	Ghotovi
Niuland (DC Sadar)	Hakhizhe
Niuland (DC Sadar)	Henito
Niuland (DC Sadar)	Hevikhe
Niuland (DC Sadar)	Hevishe
Niuland (DC Sadar)	Hezheto
Niuland (DC Sadar)	Hezulho
Niuland (DC Sadar)	Hokuto Village
Niuland (DC Sadar)	Hovishe
Niuland (DC Sadar)	Hovukhu
Niuland (DC Sadar)	Itovi
Niuland (DC Sadar)	K. Hetoi
Niuland (DC Sadar)	Kiyezu 'A'
Niuland (DC Sadar)	Kiyezu 'B'
Niuland (DC Sadar)	Kiyelho
Niuland (DC Sadar)	Kuhoxu
Niuland (DC Sadar)	Lukuto
Niuland (DC Sadar)	P. Vizheto
Niuland (DC Sadar)	Phuhoto
Niuland (DC Sadar)	Pishikhu
Niuland (DC Sadar)	Sahoi
Niuland (DC Sadar)	Shitoi
Niuland (DC Sadar)	Sunito
Niuland (DC Sadar)	S. Vihuto
Niuland (DC Sadar)	Vishiyi
Niuland (DC Sadar)	Viyito
Niuland (DC Sadar)	Xukiye
Niuland (DC Sadar)	Yehokhu
Niuland (DC Sadar)	Yeveto
Niuland (DC Sadar)	Zuheshe
Niuland (DC Sadar)	Zukihe

== Noklak District ==
Noklak District has a total of 40 recognised villages. They are:

Division	Villages
Noklak (DC)	Dan
Noklak (DC)	Hanyuk
Noklak (DC)	Kusong
Noklak (DC)	New Pangsha
Noklak (DC)	Noklak Village
Noklak (DC)	Nokyan
Noklak (DC)	Nokyan 'B'
Noklak (DC)	Pangsha Old
Noklak (DC)	Wonthoi
Nokhu (EAC)	Anaishu
Nokhu (EAC)	Choklangan
Nokhu (EAC)	Kingpao
Nokhu (EAC)	Langnok
Nokhu (EAC)	Nokhu
Nokhu (EAC)	Nokhu Noking
Panso (EAC)	Ekhao
Panso (EAC)	Kingniu
Panso (EAC)	Lengnyu
Panso (EAC)	Patsho
Panso (EAC)	Pathso Nokeng
Panso (EAC)	Tsangkue
Panso (EAC)	Tsuwao
Panso (EAC)	Yokao
Thonoknyu (SDO(C))	Chiphur
Thonoknyu (SDO(C))	Chilliso
Thonoknyu (SDO(C))	Jejeiking
Thonoknyu (SDO(C))	Kingjung
Thonoknyu (SDO(C))	New Sanglao
Thonoknyu (SDO(C))	New Sanglao Longding
Thonoknyu (SDO(C))	Pang
Thonoknyu (SDO(C))	Pangking
Thonoknyu (SDO(C))	Peshu
Thonoknyu (SDO(C))	Peshunyukya
Thonoknyu (SDO(C))	Sanglao
Thonoknyu (SDO(C))	Thangoun
Thonoknyu (SDO(C))	Thoktsur
Thonoknyu (SDO(C))	Thonoknyu
Thonoknyu (SDO(C))	Thongsonyu
Thonoknyu (SDO(C))	Tukhinkiu
Thonoknyu (SDO(C))	Wui

== Peren District ==
Peren District has a total of 58 recognised villages. They are:

Division	Villages
Athibung (SDO(C))	Beisumpuikam
Athibung (SDO(C))	Beisumpuiram
Athibung (SDO(C))	Bongkolong
Athibung (SDO(C))	Ikiesingram
Athibung (SDO(C))	Inbung
Athibung (SDO(C))	Khelma
Athibung (SDO(C))	Libemphai
Athibung (SDO(C))	Lilen
Athibung (SDO(C))	New Beisumpui
Athibung (SDO(C))	New Chalkot
Athibung (SDO(C))	New Ngaulong
Athibung (SDO(C))	Nkoi B
Athibung (SDO(C))	Nkoi New
Athibung (SDO(C))	Nsenlwa
Athibung (SDO(C))	Old Beisumpui
Athibung (SDO(C))	Old Chalkot
Athibung (SDO(C))	Pelihang
Athibung (SDO(C))	Phaijol
Athibung (SDO(C))	Phaikholum
Athibung (SDO(C))	Phanjang
Athibung (SDO(C))	Saijang
Athibung (SDO(C))	Sailem
Athibung (SDO(C))	Sinjol Lower
Athibung (SDO(C))	Soget New
Athibung (SDO(C))	Soget Old
Athibung (SDO(C))	Songlhuh
Athibung (SDO(C))	Songngou
Athibung (SDO(C))	Songsang
Athibung (SDO(C))	Vongkithem
Jalukie (ADC)	Deukwaram
Jalukie (ADC)	Dungki
Jalukie (ADC)	Jalukie B
Jalukie (ADC)	Jalukie New
Jalukie (ADC)	Jalukie Old
Jalukie (ADC)	Jalukie Pungchi
Jalukie (ADC)	Jalukie Rongkaidai
Jalukie (ADC)	Jalukie (Sangtam)
Jalukie (ADC)	Jalukiekam
Jalukie (ADC)	Jalukielo
Jalukie (ADC)	Jalukieram
Jalukie (ADC)	Jalukie Zangdi
Jalukie (ADC)	Lekieram
Jalukie (ADC)	Lamhai
Jalukie (ADC)	Mhaikam
Jalukie (ADC)	Mhainamtsi
Jalukie (ADC)	Nkwareu
Jalukie (ADC)	Samziuram
Ngwalwa (EAC)	Benreu
Ngwalwa (EAC)	Gaili
Ngwalwa (EAC)	Gaili Namdi
Ngwalwa (EAC)	Heningkunglwa
Ngwalwa (EAC)	Heunambe
Ngwalwa (EAC)	Ngwalwa
Ngwalwa (EAC)	Pedi
Ngwalwa (EAC)	Poilwa
Ngwalwa (EAC)	Poilwa Namci
Ngwalwa (EAC)	Punglwa
Nsong (EAC)	Bamsiakilwa
Nsong (EAC)	Lalong
Nsong (EAC)	Ngaulong Old
Nsong (EAC)	Ngam
Nsong (EAC)	Nchan
Nsong (EAC)	Nsong
Nsong (EAC)	Nzauna
Peren (DC Sadar)	Kendung
Peren (DC Sadar)	Kejanglwa
Peren (DC Sadar)	Mpai
Peren (DC Sadar)	Mpai Namci
Peren (DC Sadar)	Ndunglwa
Peren (DC Sadar)	Peletkie
Peren (DC Sadar)	Peren New
Peren (DC Sadar)	Peren Old
Peren (DC Sadar)	Puilwa New
Peren (DC Sadar)	Puilwa Old
Tenning (ADC)	Azailong
Tenning (ADC)	Heiranglwa
Tenning (ADC)	Mbaulwa
Tenning (ADC)	Mbaupungchi
Tenning (ADC)	Mbaupunggwa
Tenning (ADC)	Nchangram
Tenning (ADC)	Nchangram Namsan
Tenning (ADC)	Nkialwa
Tenning (ADC)	Nkio Old
Tenning (ADC)	Nsong Namchi
Tenning (ADC)	Ntu
Tenning (ADC)	Nzau Namsan
Tenning (ADC)	Nzau Old
Tenning (ADC)	Tening
Tenning (ADC)	Tening Namsan
Tenning (ADC)	Tepun
Tenning (ADC)	Tesen New
Tenning (ADC)	Tesen Old
Tenning (ADC)	Sinjol Upper

== Phek District ==
Phek District has a total of 70 recognised villages. They are:

Division	Villages
Chetheba (EAC)	Chesezu Nasa
Chetheba (EAC)	Chesezu Nawe
Chetheba (EAC)	Khulazu Basa
Chetheba (EAC)	Khulazu Bawe
Chetheba (EAC)	Phüyoba
Chetheba (EAC)	Rihuba
Chetheba (EAC)	Thenyizumi
Chetheba (EAC)	Thipüzu
Chizami (EAC)	Chizami
Chizami (EAC)	Enhulumi
Chizami (EAC)	Mesülumi
Chizami (EAC)	Sumi
Chizami (EAC)	Thetsümi
Chozuba (ADC)	Chozu Basa
Chozuba (ADC)	Chozuba
Chozuba (ADC)	Khüsomi
Chozuba (ADC)	Rünguzu Nasa
Chozuba (ADC)	Rünguzu Nawe
Chozuba (ADC)	Thüvopisü
Chozuba (ADC)	Yoruba
Khezhakeno (EAC)	Khezhakeno
Khuza (EAC)	Chepoketa
Khuza (EAC)	Khutsokhuno
Khuza (EAC)	Khuza
Khuza (EAC)	Mütsale
Khuza (EAC)	Süthozu
Khuza (EAC)	Tehephu
Pfütsero (ADC)	Kami
Pfütsero (ADC)	Kikrüma
Pfütsero (ADC)	Lekromi
Pfütsero (ADC)	North Kikrüma
Pfütsero (ADC)	Pfütseromi
Pfütsero (ADC)	Phüsachodu
Pfütsero (ADC)	Tepfulomi
Phek (DC Sadar)	Chosaba
Phek (DC Sadar)	Kizari
Phek (DC Sadar)	Kotisu
Phek (DC Sadar)	Kütsapo
Phek (DC Sadar)	Lanezho
Phek (DC Sadar)	Losami
Phek (DC Sadar)	Losatephe
Phek (DC Sadar)	Lozaphuhü
Phek (DC Sadar)	Phek Village
Phek (DC Sadar)	Phek Basa
Phek (DC Sadar)	Satheri
Phek (DC Sadar)	Sohomi
Phek (DC Sadar)	Sürhoba
Phek (DC Sadar)	Tüzatsu
Sakraba (EAC)	Gidemi
Sakraba (EAC)	Lower Khomi
Sakraba (EAC)	Middle Khomi
Sakraba (EAC)	Pholami
Sakraba (EAC)	Porba
Sakraba (EAC)	Sakraba
Sakraba (EAC)	Upper Khomi
Razeba (EAC)	Tsüpfüme
Razeba (EAC)	Zeloma
Razeba (EAC)	Zhavame
Sekrüzu (EAC)	Dzülhami
Sekrüzu (EAC)	Khütsami
Sekrüzu (EAC)	New Rüzazho
Sekrüzu (EAC)	Phügwimi
Sekrüzu (EAC)	Rüzazho
Sekrüzu (EAC)	Süthozu Nagwu
Sekrüzu (EAC)	Süthozu Nasa
Sekrüzu (EAC)	Thürütsüswümi
Zuketsa (EAC)	Lasumi
Zuketsa (EAC)	Leshemi
Zuketsa (EAC)	Lewoza
Zuketsa (EAC)	Zapami

== Shamator District ==
Shamator District has a total of 37 recognised villages. They are:

Division	Villages
Chessore (SDO)	Aiponger
Chessore (SDO)	Chessore
Chessore (SDO)	Hukir
Chessore (SDO)	Kelongru
Chessore (SDO)	Kenüwong
Chessore (SDO)	Keyanru
Chessore (SDO)	Lunthur
Mangko (EAC)	Kephore
Mangko (EAC)	Kiutsukiur
Mangko (EAC)	Losolo
Mangko (EAC)	Shiponger
Mangko (EAC)	Thiyang
Mangko (EAC)	Y. Anner
Shamator (DC Sadar)	Chassir
Shamator (DC Sadar)	Kesangwong
Shamator (DC Sadar)	Lasikiur
Shamator (DC Sadar)	Liangkonger
Shamator (DC Sadar)	Muleangkiur
Shamator (DC Sadar)	Sangphur
Shamator (DC Sadar)	Shamator Village
Shamator (DC Sadar)	Wapher
Shamator (DC Sadar)	Yakor
Thsotoku (EAC)	K. Longsor
Thsotoku (EAC)	Kiusowongto
Thsotoku (EAC)	Kuthur
Thsotoku (EAC)	Langa
Thsotoku (EAC)	Longtokru
Thsotoku (EAC)	Moyit
Thsotoku (EAC)	Thsotoku (Sotokur)
Tsurungto (EAC)	Anatongre
Tsurungto (EAC)	Hudhangru
Tsurungto (EAC)	Maipok
Tsurungto (EAC)	Nutsu
Tsurungto (EAC)	Pungrunger
Tsurungto (EAC)	Rurur 'A' and Rurur 'B'
Tsurungto (EAC)	Sukiur 'A' and Sukiur 'B'
Tsurungto (EAC)	Tsuthu

== Tseminyü District ==
Tseminyü District has a total of 40 recognised villages. They are:

Division	Villages
Tseminyu (DC Sadar)	Chunlikha
Tseminyu (DC Sadar)	Ehunnu
Tseminyu (DC Sadar)	Guju
Tseminyu (DC Sadar)	Gukhanyü
Tseminyu (DC Sadar)	Henbenji
Tseminyu (DC Sadar)	Kandinu
Tseminyu (DC Sadar)	Kashanyü
Tseminyu (DC Sadar)	Kashanyishin
Tseminyu (DC Sadar)	Khenyü
Tseminyu (DC Sadar)	Khonibinzun
Tseminyu (DC Sadar)	K. Station
Tseminyu (DC Sadar)	Likhwenchu
Tseminyu (DC Sadar)	New Terogvünyü
Tseminyu (DC Sadar)	Ngvuphen
Tseminyu (DC Sadar)	Nsunyü
Tseminyu (DC Sadar)	Phenda
Tseminyu (DC Sadar)	Phenshunyü
Tseminyu (DC Sadar)	Phentejon Bamboo Model
Tseminyu (DC Sadar)	Phenwhenyü
Tseminyu (DC Sadar)	Rumesinyü
Tseminyu (DC Sadar)	Sewanu
Tseminyu (DC Sadar)	Sishunu
Tseminyu (DC Sadar)	Tesophenyü
Tseminyu (DC Sadar)	Tesophenyü New
Tseminyu (DC Sadar)	Terogvunyü
Tseminyu (DC Sadar)	Tseminyü
Tseminyu (DC Sadar)	Tseminyü South
Tseminyu (DC Sadar)	Tsonsa
Tseminyu (DC Sadar)	Tsonzunphen
Tseminyu (DC Sadar)	Yikhanu
Tseminyu (DC Sadar)	Ziphenyü
Tseminyu (DC Sadar)	Zisunyü
Tsogin (EAC)	Gwachonlo
Tsogin (EAC)	Logwesunyü
Tsogin (EAC)	Lotsuphen
Tsogin (EAC)	New Sendenyü
Tsogin (EAC)	Rengmapani
Tsogin (EAC)	Sendenyü
Tsogin (EAC)	Thongsunyü
Tsogin (EAC)	Tsosinyü

== Tuensang District ==
Tuensang District has a total of recognised villages. They are:

Division	Villages
Chare (EAC)	Alisopur
Chare (EAC)	Chungliyimti
Chare (EAC)	Chungliyimti New
Chare (EAC)	Kiding
Chare (EAC)	Longkhitpeh
Chare (EAC)	New Tsadang
Chare (EAC)	New Tsaru
Chare (EAC)	Old Tsadang
Chare (EAC)	Tonlongsor
Chare (EAC)	Trongar
Chare (EAC)	Tsaru
Chingmei (EAC)
Chingmei (EAC)	New Chingmei
Chingmei (EAC)	Taknyu
Chingmei (EAC)	Yimpang
Chingmei (EAC)	Waoshu
Chingmei (EAC)	Chendang Saddle
Chingmei (EAC)	Chingme
Longkhim (ADC)	Ahotsi
Longkhim (ADC)	Angangba
Longkhim (ADC)	Chimonger
Longkhim (ADC)	Chungtor
Longkhim (ADC)	Holongba
Longkhim (ADC)	Lirise
Longkhim (ADC)	New Mungankhyun
Longkhim (ADC)	Old Mungankhyun
Longkhim (ADC)	Phir-Ahir
Longkhim (ADC)	Sangsomong
Longkhim (ADC)	Sangsomong New
Ngoungchung (EAC)	Bhumpak
Ngoungchung (EAC)	Haak
Ngoungchung (EAC)	Lokong
Ngoungchung (EAC)	Longtang
Ngoungchung (EAC)	Momching
Ngoungchung (EAC)	Nakshou
Ngoungchung (EAC)	Saoshou
Ngoungchung (EAC)	Yali
Sangsangnyu (EAC)	Chendang
Sangsangnyu (EAC)	Hakchang
Sangsangnyu (EAC)	Kejok
Sangsangnyu (EAC)	Keshai
Sangsangnyu (EAC)	Konya
Sangsangnyu (EAC)	Maksha
Sangsangnyu (EAC)	Nyinyem
Sangsangnyu (EAC)	Sangchen
Sangsangnyu (EAC)	Sangsangnyu
Tuensang (DC Sadar)	Botambou
Tuensang (DC Sadar)	Chingmelen
Tuensang (DC Sadar)	Chongshen
Tuensang (DC Sadar)	Eshou
Tuensang (DC Sadar)	Helipong
Tuensang (DC Sadar)	Khudei
Tuensang (DC Sadar)	Ngangpong
Tuensang (DC Sadar)	Sipongsang
Tuensang (DC Sadar)	Tuensang
Tuensang (DC Sadar)	Yungphang

== Wokha District ==
Wokha District has a total of 131 recognised villages. They are:

Division	Villages
Aitepyong (EAC)	Akuk New
Aitepyong (EAC)	Akuk Old
Aitepyong (EAC)	Chankayan
Aitepyong (EAC)	Lakhuti
Aitepyong (EAC)	Mekokla
Aitepyong (EAC)	Zuxüshe
Baghty (EAC)	Makharong
Baghty (EAC)	Nitsuyan
Baghty (EAC)	Soku
Baghty (EAC)	Upper Baghty
Bhandari (ADC)	Alikhum
Bhandari (ADC)	Bhandari
Bhandari (ADC)	Hayiyan
Bhandari (ADC)	Khumchoyan
Bhandari (ADC)	Koro New
Bhandari (ADC)	Koro Old
Bhandari (ADC)	Lio Longchum
Bhandari (ADC)	Lio Wokha New
Bhandari (ADC)	Lio Wokha Old
Bhandari (ADC)	Liphi
Bhandari (ADC)	Lishiyo
Bhandari (ADC)	Longayim
Bhandari (ADC)	Longjung
Bhandari (ADC)	Mekirang
Bhandari (ADC)	Merapani
Bhandari (ADC)	Mongphio
Bhandari (ADC)	Pangtong
Bhandari (ADC)	Renthan
Bhandari (ADC)	Roni New
Bhandari (ADC)	Roni Old
Bhandari (ADC)	Ruchan
Bhandari (ADC)	Serika
Bhandari (ADC)	Sungkha
Bhandari (ADC)	Suphayan
Bhandari (ADC)	Tongtiyan
Bhandari (ADC)	Yamhon New
Bhandari (ADC)	Yamhon Old
Bhandari (ADC)	Yencho
Bhandari (ADC)	Yimpang
Bhandari (ADC)	Yimparasa
Bhandari (ADC)	Yimza
Bhandari (ADC)	Zujum
Changpang (EAC)	Aghautito
Changpang (EAC)	Akahuto
Changpang (EAC)	Akuhaiqua
Changpang (EAC)	Amboto New
Changpang (EAC)	Amboto Old
Changpang (EAC)	Azuhoto
Changpang (EAC)	Changpang
Changpang (EAC)	Khakuthato
Changpang (EAC)	Lio Longidang
Changpang (EAC)	Litchuyan
Changpang (EAC)	Longtssiri
Changpang (EAC)	Mithehe
Changpang (EAC)	Sumito
Changpang (EAC)	Tssori New
Changpang (EAC)	Tssori Old
Changpang (EAC)	Wozhu New
Changpang (EAC)	Wozhu Old
Englan (EAC)	Changsu New
Englan (EAC)	Changsu Old
Englan (EAC)	Ekhyoyan
Englan (EAC)	Mmyan
Englan (EAC)	New Riphyim
Englan (EAC)	Old Riphyim
Englan (EAC)	Ronren
Englan (EAC)	Thillong
Englan (EAC)	Yikhüm
Lotsu (EAC)	Longtsung
Lotsu (EAC)	Lotsu
Lotsu (EAC)	Moilan
Lotsu (EAC)	Morakjo
Lotsu (EAC)	Pyangsa
Lotsu (EAC)	Pyotchu
Lotsu (EAC)	Sheru-Echuk
Ralan (SDO(C))	Chandalashung New
Ralan (SDO(C))	Chandalashung Old
Ralan (SDO(C))	Jandalashung B
Ralan (SDO(C))	Likayan
Ralan (SDO(C))	Liphanyan
Ralan (SDO(C))	Lishayan
Ralan (SDO(C))	Ralan New
Ralan (SDO(C))	Ralan Old
Ralan (SDO(C))	Ronsuyan
Ralan (SDO(C))	S. Wochan
Ralan (SDO(C))	Soshan
Ralan (SDO(C))	Tchujanphen
Ralan (SDO(C))	Wochan
Ralan (SDO(C))	Woroku
Ralan (SDO(C))	Yampha
Ralan (SDO(C))	Yanlum
Sanis (ADC)	Chudi
Sanis (ADC)	Esanphen
Sanis (ADC)	Meshangpen
Sanis (ADC)	Sanis
Sanis (ADC)	Sunglup
Sanis (ADC)	Tsopo
Sanis (ADC)	Yonchucho
Sungro (EAC)	Aasha
Sungro (EAC)	Aree New
Sungro (EAC)	Aree Old
Sungro (EAC)	Okotso
Sungro (EAC)	Pangti
Sungro (EAC)	Yanthanro
Wokha (DC Sadar)	Ekokju
Wokha (DC Sadar)	Elümyu
Wokha (DC Sadar)	Hümtso
Wokha (DC Sadar)	Khumtsu
Wokha (DC Sadar)	Longla
Wokha (DC Sadar)	Longsachung
Wokha (DC Sadar)	Longsa
Wokha (DC Sadar)	Niroyo
Wokha (DC Sadar)	N/Longidang
Wokha (DC Sadar)	New Wokha
Wokha (DC Sadar)	Okheyan
Wokha (DC Sadar)	Pongidong
Wokha (DC Sadar)	Ruzumphen
Wokha (DC Sadar)	Santsuphen
Wokha (DC Sadar)	Tsungza
Wokha (DC Sadar)	Wokha
Wokha (DC Sadar)	Yanthamo
Wokha (DC Sadar)	Yimkha
Wozhuro (EAC)	Hankvu
Wozhuro (EAC)	L. Yanthung
Wozhuro (EAC)	Meriyan
Wozhuro (EAC)	N/Longchum
Wozhuro (EAC)	Phiro
Wozhuro (EAC)	Sankiton
Wozhuro (EAC)	Shaki
Wozhuro (EAC)	Totsu
Wozhuro (EAC)	Yankeli

== Zünheboto District ==
Zünheboto District has a total of 171 recognised villages. They are:

Division	Villages
Aghunato (ADC)	Aghiyilimi
Aghunato (ADC)	Akuba Old
Aghunato (ADC)	Aquba New
Aghunato (ADC)	Ghokishe
Aghunato (ADC)	Ghuvishe
Aghunato (ADC)	Keltomi
Aghunato (ADC)	Khetoi
Aghunato (ADC)	Khukishe
Aghunato (ADC)	Lukikhe
Aghunato (ADC)	Lukhuyi
Aghunato (ADC)	Lutsumi
Aghunato (ADC)	Luvishe New
Aghunato (ADC)	Luvishe Old
Aghunato (ADC)	Nivishe
Aghunato (ADC)	Phulesheto
Aghunato (ADC)	Shevishe
Aghunato (ADC)	Thokihi
Aghunato (ADC)	Tokiye
Aghunato (ADC)	Tsukomi
Aghunato (ADC)	Viyelho
Aghunato (ADC)	Viyixe
Aghunato (ADC)	Yezashi
Aghunato (ADC)	Zheyishe
Akuhaito (EAC)	Philimi
Akuhaito (EAC)	Roto New
Akuhaito (EAC)	Roto Old
Akuhaito (EAC)	Khrimtomi
Akuluto (ADC)	Alaphumi
Akuluto (ADC)	Lotisa New
Akuluto (ADC)	Lotisa Old
Akuluto (ADC)	Lumami
Akuluto (ADC)	Lumithsami
Akuluto (ADC)	Sema Settsu
Akuluto (ADC)	Shichimi
Akuluto (ADC)	Sutemi
Akuluto (ADC)	Zaphumi
Asuto (EAC)	Achikuchu 'A'
Asuto (EAC)	Achikuchu 'B'
Asuto (EAC)	Aghulimi
Asuto (EAC)	Akhakhu
Asuto (EAC)	Asuto
Asuto (EAC)	Atunakugha
Asuto (EAC)	Kathara
Asuto (EAC)	Khumishimi 'A'
Asuto (EAC)	Khumishimi 'B'
Asuto (EAC)	Kikhevi
Asuto (EAC)	Kitahumi
Asuto (EAC)	Koiboto
Asuto (EAC)	Lizutomi
Asuto (EAC)	Melahumi
Asuto (EAC)	Ngozubomi
Asuto (EAC)	Nihoshe
Asuto (EAC)	Nizhevi
Asuto (EAC)	Satami
Asuto (EAC)	Tazuhumi
Asuto (EAC)	Tizuhumi
Asuto (EAC)	Tokizhe
Asuto (EAC)	Yeshito
Asuto (EAC)	Yevishe 'A'
Atoizu (ADC)	Asukhuto
Atoizu (ADC)	Awotsakilimi
Atoizu (ADC)	Emlo
Atoizu (ADC)	Litsami
Atoizu (ADC)	Lokobomi
Atoizu (ADC)	Mapulumi
Atoizu (ADC)	Naghuto Old
Atoizu (ADC)	Nahguto New
Atoizu (ADC)	Sukomi
Atoizu (ADC)	Vekuho New
Atoizu (ADC)	Vekuho Old
Atoizu (ADC)	Yesholuto
Ghathashi (EAC)	Awohumi
Ghathashi (EAC)	Chishilimi
Ghathashi (EAC)	Chisholimi
Ghathashi (EAC)	Hebolimi
Ghathashi (EAC)	Iغانumi
Ghathashi (EAC)	Ighavito
Ghathashi (EAC)	Iphonumi
Ghathashi (EAC)	Khughutomi
Ghathashi (EAC)	Kichilimi
Ghathashi (EAC)	Kilomi
Ghathashi (EAC)	Mukalimi
Ghathashi (EAC)	Shesulimi
Ghathashi (EAC)	Tukuliqa
Hoshepu (EAC)	Hoshepu
Hoshepu (EAC)	Khehoto
Hoshepu (EAC)	Khekiye
Hoshepu (EAC)	Nihoshe
Pughoboto (ADC)	Asukiqa
Pughoboto (ADC)	Ghokimi
Pughoboto (ADC)	Kitami
Pughoboto (ADC)	Laza Phuyeqa
Pughoboto (ADC)	Lazami
Pughoboto (ADC)	Mishilimi
Pughoboto (ADC)	Natsumi
Pughoboto (ADC)	Puneboqa
Pughoboto (ADC)	Tsaphimi
Saptiqa (EAC)	Shena New
Saptiqa (EAC)	Shena Old
Saptiqa (EAC)	Usutomi
Saptiqa (EAC)	Zhevishe
Satakha (ADC)	Ghukhuyi
Satakha (ADC)	Hoishe
Satakha (ADC)	Khukiye
Satakha (ADC)	Kilo Old
Satakha (ADC)	Kivikhu
Satakha (ADC)	Kiyekhu
Satakha (ADC)	Lukhai
Satakha (ADC)	Nunumi
Satakha (ADC)	Satakha
Satakha (ADC)	Satakha Old
Satakha (ADC)	Shoipu
Satakha (ADC)	Shoixe
Satakha (ADC)	Sukhai
Satakha (ADC)	Tukunasami
Satakha (ADC)	Vishepu
Satakha (ADC)	Xuivi
Satakha (ADC)	Zhekiye
Satoi (EAC)	Ghokhuvi
Satoi (EAC)	Hokiye
Satoi (EAC)	Ikiye
Satoi (EAC)	Itovi
Satoi (EAC)	Kheshito
Satoi (EAC)	Khuvuxu
Satoi (EAC)	Satoi
Satoi (EAC)	Thakiye
Satoi (EAC)	Tsuruhu
Satoi (EAC)	Tsutoho
Suruhuto (SDO(C))	Aichisaghemi
Suruhuto (SDO(C))	Kholeboto
Suruhuto (SDO(C))	Khuniho
Suruhuto (SDO(C))	Kiyetha
Suruhuto (SDO(C))	Lithsami
Suruhuto (SDO(C))	Phuye New
Suruhuto (SDO(C))	Phuye Old
Suruhuto (SDO(C))	Sapotimi
Suruhuto (SDO(C))	Surumi
Suruhuto (SDO(C))	Tichipami
Suruhuto (SDO(C))	Vedami
Suruhuto (SDO(C))	Yehemi
Suruhuto (SDO(C))	Zhekuto
VK (EAC)	Ajiqami
VK (EAC)	Izheto
VK (EAC)	Litta New
VK (EAC)	Litta Old
VK (EAC)	Maromi
VK (EAC)	Mukhami
VK (EAC)	Phushumi
VK (EAC)	Satsami
Zünheboto (DC Sadar)	Asukhomi
Zünheboto (DC Sadar)	Baimho
Zünheboto (DC Sadar)	Ghukiye
Zünheboto (DC Sadar)	Hekiye
Zünheboto (DC Sadar)	Kawato
Zünheboto (DC Sadar)	Kulhopu
Zünheboto (DC Sadar)	Lizu Aviqato
Zünheboto (DC Sadar)	Lizu Naghuto
Zünheboto (DC Sadar)	Lizu New
Zünheboto (DC Sadar)	Lizu Old
Zünheboto (DC Sadar)	Lochomi
Zünheboto (DC Sadar)	Natha New
Zünheboto (DC Sadar)	Natha Old
Zünheboto (DC Sadar)	Newland
Zünheboto (DC Sadar)	Nikuto
Zünheboto (DC Sadar)	Sheyipu
Zünheboto (DC Sadar)	Shotomi
Zünheboto (DC Sadar)	Sukhalu
Zünheboto (DC Sadar)	Xukhepu
Zünheboto (DC Sadar)	Yemishe
Zünheboto (DC Sadar)	Yezami
Zünheboto (DC Sadar)	Zungti

== See also ==
- Outline of Nagaland
