= Merangkong =

- Village
- Location in Nagaland, India Merangkong (India)
- Coordinates: 26°34′N 94°40′E
- Country: India
- Region: Northeast India
- State: Nagaland
- District: Mokokchung
- Elevation: 547.726 m (1,797.00 ft)

Languages
  - Dialect: Chungli
- Time zone: UTC+5:30 (IST)
- Vehicle registration: NL-02
- Website: nagaland.gov.in

Merangkong is an Ao Naga village located 40 km north of Mokokchung, Nagaland. Merangkong is situated in the Langpangkong Range of Mokokchung District at an altitude of 1,797 ft above sea level.

Changtongya, 3 km to the south, is the nearest town. The census of 2001 put its population at 4052. The population is pushed up to 5570 if Merangkong Compound is included.

== See also ==
- List of villages in Nagaland
