= Chungtia =

- Village
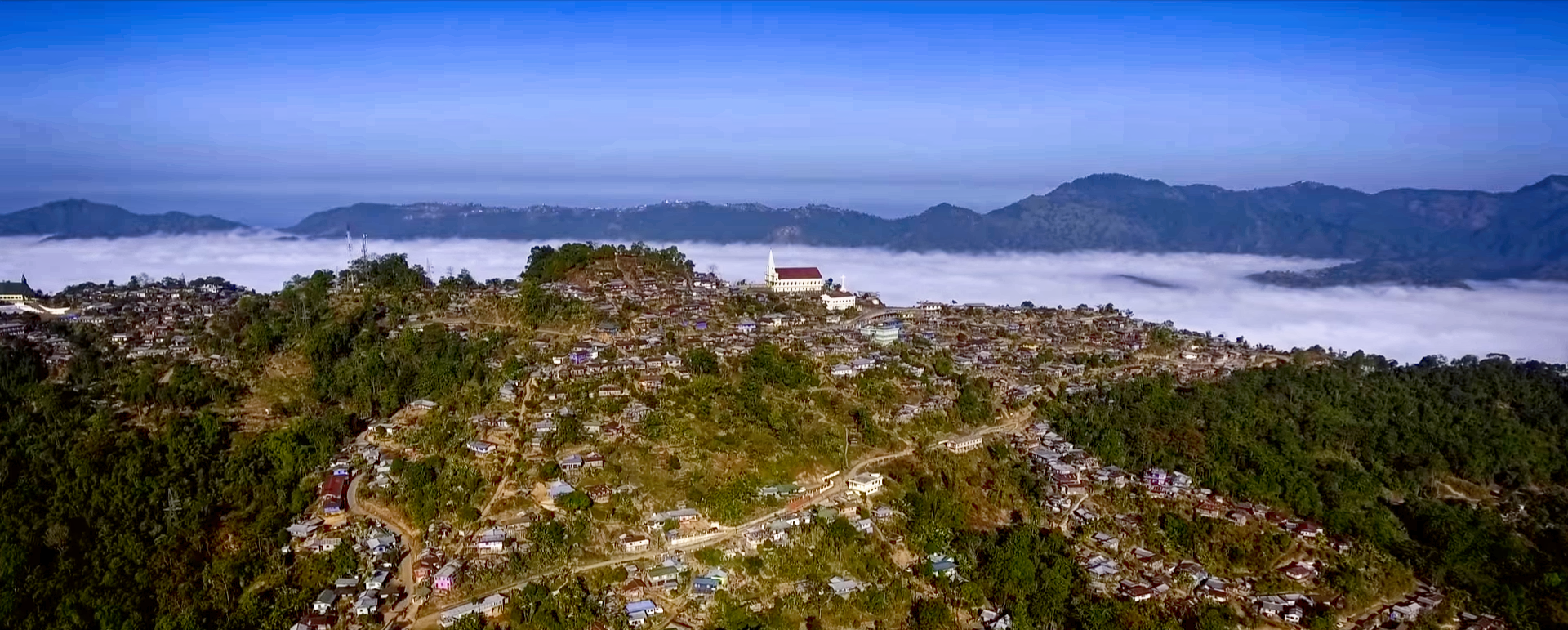
- Aerial view of Chungtia

- Location in Nagaland, India Chungtia (India)
- Coordinates: 26°24′N 94°28′E
- Country: India
- State: Nagaland

Population (2011)
  - Total: 4,661

Languages
  - Official: English
- Time zone: UTC+5:30 (IST)
- Vehicle registration: NL
- Website: nagaland.gov.in

Chungtia is an Ao Naga village in Nagaland, India. It lies in the Ongpangkong range and is located 16 km north-west of Mokokchung. The Mokokchung-Mariani Highway passes through its eastern corner. It is located at an altitude of 3,362 feet (1,025 m) above sea level.

The suburb of Sabangya and the Aliba village form a continuous settlement area along with Chungtia. According to Edward W. Clark's accounts, when he first set foot in Molung village in 1872, Molung, which was under the protectorate of Chungtia, had to seek permission from the latter for his stay which was promptly allowed by Chungtia. Subsequently, he went on to spread Christianity all over Nagaland.

The cultural festivities of the Ao Naga, Moatsü and Tsüngremong, are celebrated by the villagers.

According to the local memory, it is one of the few Ao villages that has never been defeated. Today, stories of those warriors circulate through folk songs, dances, and stories. A historical log drum can also be seen situated on a hill top.

== Population ==
Chungtia village has population of 4661 of which 2408 are males while 2253 are females as per the 2011 Census of India.

The village has a population of children with age 0-6 is 641 which makes up 13.75% of total population of village. Average sex ratio of Chungtia village is 942 which is higher than the state average of 931. Child sex ratio for the Chungtia as per census is 978, higher than Nagaland average of 943.

== Literacy rate ==
Chungtia village has a high literacy rate. In 2011, literacy rate of Chungtia village was 86.12% compared to the average 79.55% of the state. Male literacy stands at 88.39% while female literacy rate is 83.68%.

== Educational Institutions ==
- Government Primary School
- Government Middle School
- Christ King School
- Jubilee Memorial School

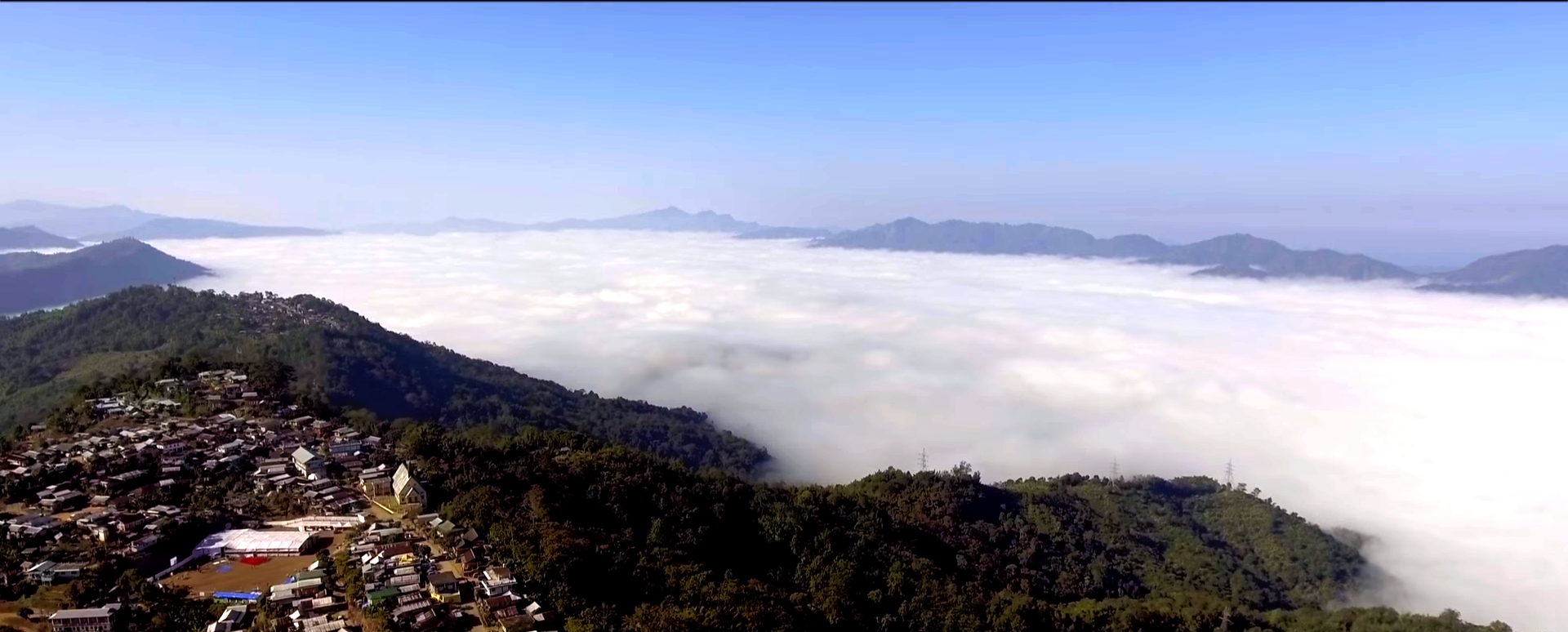
Changkikong as seen from Chungtia.

== Plants of Chungtia ==
Chungtia villagers of Nagaland, India, have a strong reliance on plants as medicines. Previous studies have shown that 31 Chungtia medicinal plants (and parts therein) used customarily for skin related treatments possess antimicrobial properties against skin pathogens, strongly supporting the use of these plants by the Chungtia villagers. Five plants, namely Albizia lucidior, Begonia picta, Cassia floribunda, Holboellia latifolia, and Maesa indica have no previous studies on their antimicrobial properties, while Prunus persica has only antimicrobial activity reported on its fruit, with no reports on its roots, which are used by the Chungtia villagers. These six plants for their antimicrobial properties against dermatologically relevant pathogens and undertake phytochemical analysis of the most active species, Prunus persica.

The presence of pathogenic bacteria and fungi can cause skin infections and exacerbate the healing of and seriousness of sores and wounds. Skin disease and infections cause a significant global disease burden, and with the escalating occurrence of multidrug resistant microorganisms, there is heightened concern that the rates of skin infections will only worsen. Much research effort is therefore being focused on identifying new antimicrobial compounds, including those isolated from nature. Since the introduction of conventional antibiotics in the 1950s, there has been little use of plant derivatives as antimicrobials. However, interest in using phytochemicals (products from secondary plant metabolism) for the treatment of microbial infections has increased from the late 1990s following the poor efficacy of conventional antibiotics, due in part to their often excessive and inappropriate use in mammalian infections.

The Chungtia villagers have developed a wealth of knowledge on medicinal flora over many generations. An ethnobotanical study documented 37 medicinal plants used by Chungtia villagers for the treatment of skin related ailments consistent with a microbial aetiology.

=== Selection of plants for antimicrobial testing ===
Previously reported the customary uses by Chungtia villagers of 38 plants for the topical treatment of skin related ailments of a likely microbial aetiology. Following an extensive literature review on the antimicrobial activities and antimicrobially active extracts/chemical constituents of these plants, it was found that extracts from 21 of the plants, including relevant plant parts used by the Chungtia villagers, have previously been analysed for their antimicrobial properties, 12 were reported for possessing antimicrobial activity in a different plant part and compounds with antimicrobial activities have been isolated from fourteen of them. These findings strongly support the customary uses of these plants by the Chungtia villagers. Five Chungtia plants, namely Albizia lucidior, Begonia picta, Cassia floribunda, Holboellia latifolia, and Maesa indica have no prior studies on their antimicrobial properties, while only fruit of Prunus persica have been previously studied for antimicrobial activity, with no reports on the roots used by the Chungtia villagers. These six plants were therefore selected for antimicrobial studies.

While all the tested plant extracts showed activity against at least two microorganisms in the MTT microdilution assay, only the P. persica extract was active when tested using the disc diffusion method. The discrepancy in results between these two methods is not uncommon. While the disc diffusion assay is a commonly used method for the antimicrobial screening of medicinal plants, the activity measured as the zone of inhibition is influenced by numerous factors including the size and polarity of the compounds present. Moreover, filter paper discs, which are commonly used and were utilised in this study, can also influence results. Paper discs are composed of cellulose, which possesses many free hydroxyl groups which render the surface of the discs hydrophilic. Therefore, polar compounds can adsorb to the surface of the discs and not diffuse into the medium. As a consequence, some polar compounds that possess antimicrobial activity may not show a zone of inhibition in the disc diffusion assay. Non-polar compounds would not be influenced by the hydroxyls on the surface of the paper, but because of their hydrophobic nature may not diffuse through the aqueous medium resulting in false negatives. Large molecules also often diffuse poorly. Thus, some antimicrobial compounds may not be identified using a disc diffusion assay. On the other hand, the accuracy of the MTT microdilution assay can be compromised by samples that are coloured (such as plant extracts), redox active and/or samples that are not soluble in the medium, which is predominantly aqueous. Although more toxic solvents such as methanol or acetone can be used for water-insoluble compounds (no more than 2% final concentration), DMSO is a popular alternative due to its comparatively lower toxicity. Regardless of the solvent used, some of the compounds might still precipitate which will reduce interaction between the sample tested and the bacteria and as a result limit the sample activity. Therefore, a combination of the disc diffusion assay with at least one other assay is often preferred for screening.

=== Isolation and antimicrobial activity of extracts and compounds of P. persica ===
As the extract of the roots of P. persica demonstrated good activity in both the disc diffusion and MTT microdilution assays, it was selected for further chemical analyses. The Chungtia villagers consume the liquid from fresh roots of P. persica soaked in water to treat typhoid and the seed endosperm is eaten to treat dysentery and diarrhoea. The liquid from the roots and aqueous decoctions of the leaves are also used to treat skin related infections. Except for the roots, all plant parts from this species have been reported for various pharmacological properties, such as antioxidant, anti-inflammatory activities, and hepato- and cardio-protective properties. To the best of our knowledge, the only antibacterial activity reported of this species is for the roots.

Antimicrobial screening of Chungtia medicinal plants used customarily for skin related ailments, i.e. Albizia lucidior (roots), Begonia picta (leaves), Cassia floribunda (leaves), Holboellia latifolia (leaves), Maesa indica (leaves) and Prunus persica (roots) against dermatologically relevant microorganisms showed that all of the plants possess various levels of antibacterial activity. This supports the customary use of these species. Investigation of the n-hexane and EtOAc fractions of the root extract of P. persica using bioassay-guided isolation techniques led to the isolation of ent-epiafzelechin-(2α→O→7',4α→8')-(-)ent-afzelechin (1, S. aureus MIC 156 μg/mL, MRSA and MDRSA MIC 312 μg/mL, E. coli β-, S. typhimurium and P. aeruginosa MIC 2500 μg/mL), afzelechin (2, not active), α-cyanobenzyl benzoate (3, S. aureus, MDRSA and MRSA 78 μg/mL, E. coli β- MIC 312 μg/mL and P. aeruginosa MIC 625 μg/mL), β-sitosterol (4, S. aureus, MDRSA, MRSA and E. coli β- MIC 2500 μg/mL, S. typhimurium MIC 625 μg/mL, P. aeruginosa MIC 1250 μg/mL) and stigmast-4-en-3-one (5, S. aureus, MDRSA and MRSA MIC 156 μg/mL, E. coli β- MIC 312, S. typhimurium MIC 625 μg/mL and P. aeruginosa MIC 1250 μg/mL). Very good antimicrobial activity of the isolated compounds 1 and 3 and good activity of compound 4 against a range of dermatologically relevant bacteria supports the traditional application of this plant to treat skin related ailments. This is the first report of the isolated compounds 1 and 3 possessing antimicrobial activities as well as the first report of ent-epiafzelechin-(2α→O→7',4α→8')-(-)ent-afzelechin and α-cyanobenzyl benzoate being isolated from genus Prunus.

== See also ==
- List of villages in Nagaland
