= Changtongya =

Changtongya Mopungyimti, Ozumongdak
- town
- Location in Nagaland, India
- Coordinates: 26.57°N 94.70°E
- Country: India
- State: Nagaland
- District: Mokokchung

Area
  - Total: 4 km^{2} (1.5 sq mi)
- Elevation: 506 m (1,660 ft)

Population (2001)
  - Total: 7,532
  - Density: 2,307/km^{2} (5,980/sq mi)

Languages
  - Official: English
- Time zone: UTC+5:30 (IST)
- PIN: 798613
- Telephone code: 0369
- Vehicle registration: NL-02
- Website: nagaland.nic.in

Changtongya is a hilly town in Mokokchung district of Nagaland. Located around 40 km north of Mokokchung and 40 km south of Tuli, it lies midway between the two largest urban centres of the district. The town is located at an altitude of 954 metres above sea level. Ao is the language spoken here.

Changtongya town comprises two main divisions: Changtongya Headquarters; and Changtongya Electrical Colony.

== Geography ==
Changtongya is located at 26.57°N 94.70°E. It has an average elevation of 506 m (1,660 ft).

== Demographics ==
As per the census of 2011, the population of Changtongya town has been recorded as 7,532. It is the third largest town in the district after Mokokchung and Tuli town

== Nature and wildlife ==
Changtongya is located in the Langpangkong Range which runs in a north–south direction, the Tsula (Dikhu) river flows parallel to the range to the east, and the Melak on its west. The town has views of the Melak and the Tsula Valleys as well as the peaks and ranges of Naga hills rising from the valleys.

Changtongya has a no-hunting zone reserve forest, which is a haven for bird watchers. Migratory falcons from Mongolia and Germany fly to this forest.

A feature of the Tsula (Dikhu) river is that here is a spot in the river where crude oil pops up which the locals called "menemtsu". The locals use the oil as night lamp and for other purposes.

== Transport and Communication ==
Changtongya is well connected to every part of the district as also the state. National Highway-61 passes through this town. It is also the gateway to Longleng district where the highways to Longleng town and Tamlu originate from here. The nearest airport is Jorhat Civil Air Terminal and Dibrugarh in Assam.

== Administration ==
Changtongya is a sub divisional headquarters under a Sub Divisional Officer, i.e. SDO (Civil).

== Politics ==
Changtongya falls under 22 Arkakong Assembly Constituency of the Nagaland Legislative Assembly. Like most parts of Mokokchung District, it has been a stronghold of the Indian National Congress Party for a long time. The present MLA representing the constituency is from NPF Party.
