= Amenba Yaden =

Indian politician

Member of the Nagaland Legislative Assembly
- In office 2013–2018
- Preceded by: L. Temjen Jamir
- Constituency: Tuli Assembly constituency
- In office 2018–2023
- Succeeded by: A. Pangjung Jamir
- Constituency: Tuli Assembly constituency

Amenba Yaden (born 1953) is an Indian politician from Nagaland. He is a former member of the Nagaland Legislative Assembly from Tuli Assembly constituency in Mokokchung district.

== Political life ==
At the age of 60, Yaden was first elected to the 2013 Nagaland Legislative Assembly election as an independent candidate to represent the Tuli Assembly constituency. He defeated the incumbent Naga People's Front (NPF) candidate L. Temjen Jamir by a margin of 2749 votes.

In the 2018 Nagaland Legislative Assembly election, Amenba Yaden won the Tuli seat on an NPF ticket by defeating L. Temjen Jamir who had joined Janata Dal (United) by a margin of 886 votes which was 6.06% of the total votes polled in the constituency. NPF had a vote share of 26.44% in 2018 in the seat.

Yaden was elected to the 2018 Nagaland Legislative Assembly election representing the Tuli Assembly constituency in Mokokchung district reserved for Scheduled Tribe community. He fought the election on an Naga People's Front ticket. He studied till Class 12 but retired as an Indian Forest Officer.

== Personal life ==
He is the son of the late Watimeren.
