= Ongpangkong =

Village in Nagaland, India

Ongpangkong Range

Geography
- Country: India
- State: Nagaland
- District: Mokokchung

Ongpangkong is the largest mountain range in Mokokchung District in the Indian state of Nagaland. The district headquarters of Mokokchung is itself located in this range. Important villages are Longsa, Ungma, Chungtia, Longkhüm, Mokokchung Village, Khensa, Aliba, Mangmetong Mekuli, Kinunger, Chuchuyimpang.
