= A. Pangjung Jamir =

Indian politician

Advisor, Government of Nagaland
- Incumbent
- Assumed office March 2023
- Governor: La. Ganesan
- Chief Minister: Neiphiu Rio
- Ministry and Departments: Fishery & Aquatic Resources

Member of Nagaland Legislative Assembly
- Preceded by: Amenba Yaden
- Constituency: Tuli Assembly constituency

Personal details
- Born: 23 November 1966 (age 59) Tuensang, Tuensang district, Nagaland

A. Pangjung Jamir (born 23 November 1966) is an Indian politician from Nagaland. He is a member of the Nagaland Legislative Assembly from Tuli Assembly constituency, which is reserved for Scheduled Tribe community, in Mokokchung district. He was elected in the 2023 Nagaland Legislative Assembly election, representing the Bharatiya Janata Party.

== Early life and education ==
Jamir was born on 23 November 1966 at Tuensang to Aleinba and Alemla Jamir of Asangma village in Mokokchung district. He completed his B.Sc. in agriculture in 1987 at the School of Agricultural Sciences and Rural Development, Medziphema, Nagaland which was then affiliated to North Eastern Hill University, Shillong. He took voluntary retirement in 2023 as Director of the Land Resources Department, Government of Nagaland.

== Career ==
Jamir was elected from the Tuli Assembly constituency representing the Bharatiya Janata Party in the 2023 Nagaland assembly election. He polled 10,319 votes and defeated his nearest rival and sitting MLA, Amenba Yaden of the Nationalist Congress Party, by 3,029 votes. He was one of the three first-timers who won on the BJP ticket in the Nagaland assembly.

He was sworn in as the advisor to the chief minister for the Fishery and Aquatic Resources department.

== Personal life ==
Jamir's wife is in government service at the Education Department of Nagaland. He has three sons.
