= List of Monuments of National Importance in Nagaland =

This is a list of Monuments of National Importance (ASI) as officially recognized by and available through the website of the Archaeological Survey of India in the Indian state Nagaland. The monument identifier is a combination of the abbreviation of the subdivision of the list (state, ASI circle) and the numbering as published on the website of the ASI. 4 Monuments of National Importance have been recognized by the ASI in Nagaland.

== List of monuments ==
SL. No.	Description	Location	Address	District	Coordinates	Image
N-NL-1	Ruins of Kachari Rajbari	Dimapur		Dimapur District	25°54′13″N 93°44′24″E	Ruins of Kachari Rajbari More images
N-NL-2	Memorials of Mr. G.H. Damant, Major Cook and Subedar Nurbir Sahi	Khonoma		Kohima District	25°39′16″N 94°01′19″E	Upload Photo
N-NL-3	Stone Cairn to the memory of Mr. Damant	Kohima		Kohima District		Upload Photo
N-NL-4	Lt. H. H. Forbes' Grave	Sechüma		Kohima District	25°41′37″N 94°02′05″E	Upload Photo

== See also ==
- List of Monuments of National Importance in India for other Monuments of National Importance in India
- List of State Protected Monuments in Nagaland
