= Longkhüm =

Longkhüm Ao Funemro
- village
- Nickname: Vegetable Capital of Nagaland
- Location in Nagaland, India Longkhüm (India)
- Coordinates: 26.26355°N 94.4123°E
- Country: India
- State: Nagaland

Government
  - Type: Longkhum Yimden
  - Body: Longkhum Village Council (Putu menden)

Area
  - Total: 87.9 km^{2} (33.9 sq mi)

Languages
  - Native: Chungli Ao and Mongsen Ao
- Time zone: UTC+5:30 (IST)
- Vehicle registration: NL
- Website: www.explorelongkhum.com nagaland.gov.in

Longkhüm is a village in Mokokchung district of Nagaland, India.

== History ==
Longkhum is also known as Ao Funemro, which means the 'vanguard village' for the Ao Nagas. This name refers to the village's strategic location from which the surrounding hills and valleys could be viewed during headhunting days.

== Geography ==
Longkhüm is located 17 km south-west of Mokokchung, the district headquarters. Situated at an altitude of 1846m above sea level, it is the highest village amongst the Ao Nagas. This is one of the reason people believed that the village was the resting place for the spirts of the dead.

== People ==
The people of this village are hard working and one can find exquisite handicrafts and handloom items in this village. On a clear day, one can view the eastern Himalayas of Arunachal and beyond and also the industrial smoke bellowing from the industries in Assam. The Aos have a belief that Longkhüm is the resting place of the spirit of dead on their onward journey to paradise. Mongzu Ki - eagle's eyrie - is situated at a high precipice where eagles have nested for centuries. According to Ao mythology, eagles are the manifestations of the spirits of the dead.This village was once called the Father of Ao villages during the ancient days.

Longkhüm is linked by road to National Highway-61.

== See also ==
- List of villages in Nagaland
