= Edward Winter Clark =

American Christian missionary

Reverend Edward Winter Clark
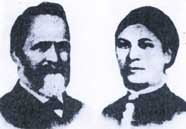
- Clark with his wife, Mary

Personal life
- Born: 25 February 1830
- Died: 18 March, 1913
- Spouse: Mary Mead Clark

Religious life
- Religion: Christianity
- Church: American Baptist Foreign Mission Society

Edward Winter Clark (E. W. Clark) (25 February, 1830 – 18 March, 1913) was an American missionary. Clark is known for his pioneering missionary work in Nagaland and for his work on transcribing the spoken Ao language into a written script. Clark created the first bilingual dictionary of the Ao language and along with his wife, Mary Mead Clark, and set up the first school in the Naga hills region of North-East India. Mary Clark documented their experience in Assam and the Naga Hills in A Corner in India.

== Early life ==
Clark was born on February 25, 1830, in North East, New York, and baptized into the Baptist faith at age 14. He attended Worcester Academy from 1839 to 1841, earned his master's degree from Brown University in 1857, and was ordained a preacher in 1859. Mary Mead was born in Amenia, New York. They married in 1858 and had one child, Carrie, who died in 1863.

== Ministry in India ==
Clark arrived at the Sibsagar Mission in 1871. On receiving permission, he moved to Molungkimong in March 1876 (an Ao Naga village in the Mokokchung district of Nagaland) and lived there until October 24, 1876.

Molung (Molungkimong) is the first Christian village in Nagaland, where 15 converts were baptized on December 22, 1872. It was in Molungyimsen that the first Naga Christian Association was held. Molungyimsen is also known as the "Cradle of Education" as the first school in Nagaland was established in Molung in 1878. The first book in Nagaland was written and printed in Molungyimsen. In 1894 Clark moved the Naga Mission Center to Impur which is now known as the Ao Baptist Arogo Mungdang (Ao Baptist Arogo Mungdang).

In 1905 Clark saw a record 190 baptisms. The Nagas were well aware that to accept Christianity would mean drastic changes in their social life. "Adherents of the old, cruel faith were quick to see that the gospel of peace and love would rapidly empty their skull houses and put to rout most of the old customs handed down from forefathers, for whom they held the greatest reverence. The missionaries presence and his teaching had spread like wildfire from mountain peak to peak and everywhere was fostered the suspicious spirit. Clark died on March 18, 1913 at age 83."

== Legacy ==
Christianity brought an end to the practice of headhunting and destroyed most of the traditional culture and oral knowledge of the various Naga tribes. Clark's vision for a Christian Nagaland came true, with the high price of destroying the Naga's indigenous culture though it has advantages including marking the end to some cultural cruelties.

By 1980 the Naga population was 572,742 and the Baptist population was 185,987.

By 2020 the Census of India put the numbers of Christians to more than 90% of the population of Nagaland thus making it, with Meghalaya and Mizoram, one of the three Christian-majority states in India. Nagaland is known as "the only predominantly Baptist state in the world."

In 2022, Ao Baptist Arogo Mungdang membership was more than 200,000, worshipping in 163 congregations.

=== Archives ===
A biographer of Clark conducting archival research at the American Baptist Historical Society at the Mission Center noted that much of Clark's correspondence was difficult to read, "written on both sides of onion skin paper".

== See also ==
- Ao Baptist Arogo Mungdang
- Nagaland Baptist Church Council
- Angami Baptist Church Council

== Bibliography ==
- Kijung L. Ao, Nokinketer Muncgchen (Impur: Nagaland, Ao Baptist Arogo Mungdang, 1972)
- A. C. Bowers, Under Headhunters' Eyes (Philadelphia: Judson Press, 1929)
- F. S. Downs, Christianity in North East India (Delhi, Ispeck: 1976)
- Tegenfelt, A Century of Growth
