= Khuzama =

- Village and Metropolitan area
- Interactive map of Khuzama
- Location of Khuzama
- Coordinates: 25.534499°N 94.135047°E
- Country: India
- Region: Northeast India
- State: Nagaland
- District: Kohima District

Population (2011)
  - Total: 5,216
  - Dialect: Keyho
- Time zone: UTC+5:30 (IST)
- PIN: 797005
- Vehicle registration: NL-01
- Sex ratio: 1084 ♂/♀
- Website: nagaland.nic.in

Khuzama is a Southern Angami Naga village on the inter-state border with Manipur located 28 km south of Kohima, the capital of Nagaland.

== Demographics ==
Khuzama is situated in Jakhama circle of Kohima District in Nagaland. As per the Population Census 2011, there are total 970 families residing in Khuzama. The total population of Khuzama is 5,216.

== Head Office ==
Khuzama, Nagaland has a Dear Lottery Head Office , where people from different parts of the region come to get information and related assistance.

== See also ==
- Southern Angami
- Angami Naga
- Chakhesang Naga
- List of villages in Nagaland
