= Yikhüm =

- Village
- Location of Yikhüm Yikhüm (India) Yikhüm (Asia) Yikhüm (Earth)
- Coordinates: 26.162768°N 94.244951°E
- Country: India
- Region: Northeast India
- State: Nagaland
- District: Wokha District

Government
  - Type: Village Council
  - Body: Yikhüm Village Council
- Elevation: 863 m (2,831 ft)

Population (2011)
  - Total: 3,174
  - Dialect: Lotha
- Time zone: UTC+5:30 (IST)
- PIN: 797111
- Vehicle registration: NL-05
- Sex ratio: 1020 females per 1000 males ♂/♀
- Climate: Temperate (Köppen)
- Website: nagaland.nic.in

Yikhüm is a Lotha Naga village located 90 km (56 mi) north of Kohima, the capital of Nagaland, India.

== Etymology ==
Yikhüm was originally known as Khümyanpan meaning "place of worship" or "village of worship" referring to the forefathers who performs various rituals before establishing a village.

The name was later changed to Yikhüm (Yi-khüm) which translates to "believe in word". ‘Oyi’ meaning "word" and ‘khüma’ meaning "believe or worship".

== History ==
The history of Yikhüm, according to oral history traces back to the 12th century A.D. Many scholars and writers opined that these people were originally from Manchuria. They migrated crossing Burma, Manipur and finally settled in Yikhüm.

== Clans ==
The people of Yikhüm were originally divided by four sectors and eight clans. Three clans were later excluded from the village—Eni, Ezüng and Kikon. The present five clans are Jüngi, Khanjüng, Kithan, Mürry and Odyüo.

== Geography ==
Yikhüm is situated at 863 m (2,831 ft) above sea level. It is bounded on the west by Sanis, on the north by Wokha, on the east by Englan and on the south by Hümtso and Elümyu.

== Demographics ==
Yikhüm is located in Englan sub-division of Wokha District, Nagaland with total 461 families residing. It has a population of 3174 of which 1571 are males while 1603 are females as per Population Census 2011.

In Yikhüm, the Average Sex Ratio is 1020 which is higher than Nagaland state average of 931.

== See also ==
- List of villages in Nagaland
- Naga people
