= Molung =

Molung Molungyimsen
- village
- Location in Nagaland, India
- Coordinates: 26.665°N 94.600°E
- Country: India
- State: Nagaland

Languages
  - Official: English
- Time zone: UTC+5:30 (IST)
- Vehicle registration: NL
- Website: nagaland.gov.in

Molung, or Molungyimsen, or New Molung is an Ao village located in the Jangpetkong range in Mokokchung District. It was formed on 24 October 1876 and from here the seeds of Christianity and Church that was first planted at Molungkimong (Deka Haimong) on 22 December 1872 by E. W. Clark, further progressed to other parts of Nagaland. An ancient leechi tree, planted by Dr. E. W. Clark in 1878, the first American Missionary to the erstwhile Naga Hills, is found here. It bears fruits even today and is over 140 years old.

Mongsenyimti and Langpangkong are the nearby important tourist places.
