= Tuli, India =

Tuli
- Town
- Location in India
- Coordinates: 26°39′23.331″N 94°38′23.5284″E
- Country: India
- District: Mokokchung District
- Elevation: 350 m (1,150 ft)

Population (2001)
  - Total: 7,864.

Languages
- Time zone: UTC+5:30 (IST)
- PIN: 798618
- Telephone code: 91 (0)38643
- Vehicle registration: NL-02
- Website: mokokchung.nic.in

Tuli is a town in the Mokokchung District of Nagaland, India. It is located on the right bank of Milak river and is 80 km north of Mokokchung. It is here that the Langpangkong Range gently rises above the Melak plains. As such the topography of Tuli is marked by low rolling hills and a gentle plain. The town consists of two main areas, Tuli headquarters and Tzüdikong (Tuli Paper Mill Township).

== Demographics ==
As of 2011 the 2011 census, Tuli town had a population of 7,864.

=== Wider definition ===
It is one of the three components that make up the town of Tuli. Together with Tuli Lenden and Tuli Paper Mill Township (Tzüdikong, population was 6,393), it forms the conglomerate of Tuli town which has a population of 15,252.

This wider definition makes it the second largest town in the Mokokchung district after Mokokchung and the largest non-district headquarters town in Nagaland.

== Transport and Communication ==
The National Highway-61 passes through Tuli. The town is the junction of host of other state and district highways. The foothill-state highway to Naginimora (in Mon) as also highways to Longleng district and Changkikong. The Japukong and Asetkong ranges converge here. The Tuli Pulp and Paper industry is located here. A railway line connects Tuli Paper mill to Amguri in neighbouring Assam.

== Administration ==
The town is a sub-divisional headquarters under an Additional Deputy Commissioner, stationed at Tuli headquarters.
