= Tuli Assembly constituency =

Legislative Assembly constituency in Nagaland State, India

Coordinates: 26.66°N 94.64°E

Tuli
- Constituency No. 21 for the Nagaland Legislative Assembly

Constituency details
- Country: India
- Region: Northeast India
- State: Nagaland
- District: Mokokchung
- Lok Sabha constituency: Nagaland
- Established: 1964
- Total electors: 18,636
- Reservation: ST

Member of Legislative Assembly
- 14th Nagaland Legislative Assembly
- Incumbent A. Pangjung Jamir
- Party: BJP
- Elected year: 2023

Tuli is one of the 60 Legislative Assembly constituencies of Nagaland state in India.

It is part of Mokokchung district and is reserved for candidates belonging to the Scheduled Tribes.

== Members of the Legislative Assembly ==
Year	Member	Party
1964	Kajenkaba	Independent politician
1966 by-election	Merachiba	Independent politician
1969	Merachiba	Nagaland Nationalist Organisation
1974	Merachiba	Nagaland Nationalist Organisation
1977	T. Tali	United Democratic Alliance
1982	I. Merachiba	Indian National Congress
1987	T. Tali	Naga National Democratic Party
1989	Tsuknungpenzu	Indian National Congress
1993	T. Tali	Indian National Congress
1998	T. Tali	Indian National Congress
2003	T. Tali	Indian National Congress
2008	L. Temjen Jamir	Naga People's Front
2013	Amenba Yaden	Independent politician
2018	Amenba Yaden	Naga People's Front
2023	A. Pangjung Jamir	Bharatiya Janata Party

== Election results ==
=== 2023 Assembly election ===
2023 Nagaland Legislative Assembly election: Tuli
Party	Candidate	Votes	%	±%
BJP	A. Pangjung Jamir	10,319	58.47%	
NCP	Amenba Yaden	7,290	41.31%	31.83%
NOTA	Nota	38	0.22%	
Margin of victory		3,029	17.16%	11.06%
Turnout		17,647	94.69%	11.25%
Registered electors		18,636		7.20%
BJP gain from NPF		Swing	31.83%	

=== 2018 Assembly election ===
2018 Nagaland Legislative Assembly election: Tuli
Party	Candidate	Votes	%	±%
NPF	Amenba Yaden	3,865	26.64%	−1.88%
JD(U)	L. Temjen Jamir	2,979	20.54%	
NDPP	James Imtikumba Yaden	2,792	19.25%	
LJP	Lipokmar Tzudir	2,350	16.20%	
NCP	S. Imtiwapang Jamir	1,375	9.48%	
Independent	I. Chubatangit Jamir	784	5.40%	
INC	Lepzungchiba Jamir	297	2.05%	−19.51%
NOTA	None of the Above	64	0.44%	
Margin of victory		886	6.11%	−10.73%
Turnout		14,506	83.44%	−8.40%
Registered electors		17,384		−2.24%
NPF gain from Independent		Swing	-18.72%	

=== 2013 Assembly election ===
2013 Nagaland Legislative Assembly election: Tuli
Party	Candidate	Votes	%	±%
Independent	Amenba Yaden	7,408	45.36%	
NPF	L. Temjen Jamir	4,659	28.53%	−0.12%
INC	I. Chubatangit Jamir	3,520	21.55%	−1.38%
BJP	Imsu Yaden	741	4.54%	
Margin of victory		2,749	16.83%	15.66%
Turnout		16,331	91.84%	22.71%
Registered electors		17,782		−20.17%
Independent gain from NPF		Swing	16.72%	

=== 2008 Assembly election ===
2008 Nagaland Legislative Assembly election: Tuli
Party	Candidate	Votes	%	±%
NPF	L. Temjen Jamir	4,411	28.65%	−13.64%
Independent	T. Tali	4,231	27.48%	
INC	Imtiwapang	3,531	22.93%	−34.78%
RJD	N. I. Wati	3,332	21.64%	
Margin of victory		180	1.17%	−14.26%
Turnout		15,398	69.61%	−29.65%
Registered electors		22,274		25.32%
NPF gain from INC		Swing	-29.07%	

=== 2003 Assembly election ===
2003 Nagaland Legislative Assembly election: Tuli
Party	Candidate	Votes	%	±%
INC	T. Tali	10,131	57.71%	
NPF	L. Temjen Jamir	7,423	42.29%	
Margin of victory		2,708	15.43%	
Turnout		17,554	98.78%	1.74%
Registered electors		17,773		10.02%
INC hold		Swing	1.20%	

=== 1998 Assembly election ===
1998 Nagaland Legislative Assembly election: Tuli
Party	Candidate	Votes	%	±%
INC	T. Tali	Unopposed		
Registered electors		16,154		10.11%
INC hold		Swing		

=== 1993 Assembly election ===
1993 Nagaland Legislative Assembly election: Tuli
Party	Candidate	Votes	%	±%
INC	T. Tali	8,042	56.51%	5.89%
NPF	Lakato	6,189	43.49%	−5.89%
Margin of victory		1,853	13.02%	11.77%
Turnout		14,231	97.04%	−1.93%
Registered electors		14,671		36.96%
INC hold		Swing	5.89%	

=== 1989 Assembly election ===
1989 Nagaland Legislative Assembly election: Tuli
Party	Candidate	Votes	%	±%
INC	Tsuknungpenzu	5,356	50.62%	13.20%
NPF	T. Tali	5,224	49.38%	
Margin of victory		132	1.25%	−23.91%
Turnout		10,580	98.97%	1.11%
Registered electors		10,712		0.67%
INC gain from NND		Swing	-11.95%	

=== 1987 Assembly election ===
1987 Nagaland Legislative Assembly election: Tuli
Party	Candidate	Votes	%	±%
NND	T. Tali	5,906	62.58%	30.82%
INC	Tsuknungpenzu	3,532	37.42%	0.37%
Margin of victory		2,374	25.15%	19.86%
Turnout		9,438	97.87%	13.55%
Registered electors		10,641		11.19%
NND gain from INC		Swing	25.52%	

=== 1982 Assembly election ===
1982 Nagaland Legislative Assembly election: Tuli
Party	Candidate	Votes	%	±%
INC	I. Merachiba	2,969	37.05%	3.70%
NND	T. Tali	2,545	31.76%	
Independent	Lakato	2,499	31.19%	
Margin of victory		424	5.29%	−24.79%
Turnout		8,013	84.32%	−9.05%
Registered electors		9,570		97.77%
INC gain from UDA		Swing	-26.38%	

=== 1977 Assembly election ===
1977 Nagaland Legislative Assembly election: Tuli
Party	Candidate	Votes	%	±%
UDA	T. Tali	2,845	63.43%	15.31%
INC	I. Merachiba	1,496	33.36%	
Independent	R. Lisen	100	2.23%	
Independent	Rentisua	44	0.98%	
Margin of victory		1,349	30.08%	26.33%
Turnout		4,485	93.37%	13.39%
Registered electors		4,839		−38.00%
UDA gain from NNO		Swing	11.56%	

=== 1974 Assembly election ===
1974 Nagaland Legislative Assembly election: Tuli
Party	Candidate	Votes	%	±%
NNO	Merachiba	3,198	51.87%	2.57%
UDA	Pangerwati	2,967	48.13%	
Margin of victory		231	3.75%	−5.46%
Turnout		6,165	79.97%	−19.43%
Registered electors		7,805		171.48%
NNO hold		Swing	2.57%	

=== 1969 Assembly election ===
1969 Nagaland Legislative Assembly election: Tuli
Party	Candidate	Votes	%	±%
NNO	Merachiba	1,409	49.30%	
UDF	Lakato	1,146	40.10%	
Independent	Kajenkaba	303	10.60%	
Margin of victory		263	9.20%	
Turnout		2,858	99.41%	
Registered electors		2,875		
NNO gain from Independent		Swing		

=== 1966 Assembly by-election ===
1966 Nagaland Legislative Assembly by-election: Tuli
Party	Candidate	Votes	%	±%
Independent	Merachiba	Unopposed		
Independent hold		Swing		

=== 1964 Assembly election ===
1964 Nagaland Legislative Assembly election: Tuli
Party	Candidate	Votes	%	±%
Independent	Kajenkaba	943	54.10%	
Independent	Noklensama Jamir	800	45.90%	
Margin of victory		143	8.20%	
Turnout		1,743	75.23%	
Registered electors		2,317		
Independent win (new seat)				

== See also ==
- List of constituencies of the Nagaland Legislative Assembly
- Mokokchung district
