= Chedema =

- Village
- Location of Chedema Chedema (India)
- Coordinates: 25°39′54″N 94°06′46″E
- Country: India
- State: Nagaland
- District: Kohima

Population (2011)
  - Total: 1,820

Languages
  - Official: English
- Time zone: UTC+5:30 (IST)
- Vehicle registration: NL-01
- Sex ratio: 863 male/female

Chedema is a village in Kohima district of Nagaland state of India.

== History ==
Chedema is a recognised village under the Kohima Sadar administrative circle of Kohima district. Chedema hosted the Peace Camp in 1964 to negotiate ceasefire agreement between the rebel Federal Government of Nagaland, Phizo-led Naga National Council, and Government of India. The arrangement was made possible through the initiatives of the Nagaland Peace Mission spearheaded by the Nagaland Baptist Church Council along with politicians Bimala Prasad Chaliha and Jayaprakash Narayan, and clergyman Michael Scott.

== Institutions ==
Chedema has a Government Middle School located in the village.
