= Peducha =

- Village
- Location of Peducha Peducha (India)
- Country: India
- State: Nagaland
- District: Kohima

Population (2011)
  - Total: 1,087

Languages
  - Official: English
- Time zone: UTC+5:30 (IST)
- Vehicle registration: NL-01
- Sex ratio: 934 ♂/♀

Peducha is a village in Kohima district of Nagaland state of India. The total population of the village is about 1,087.
