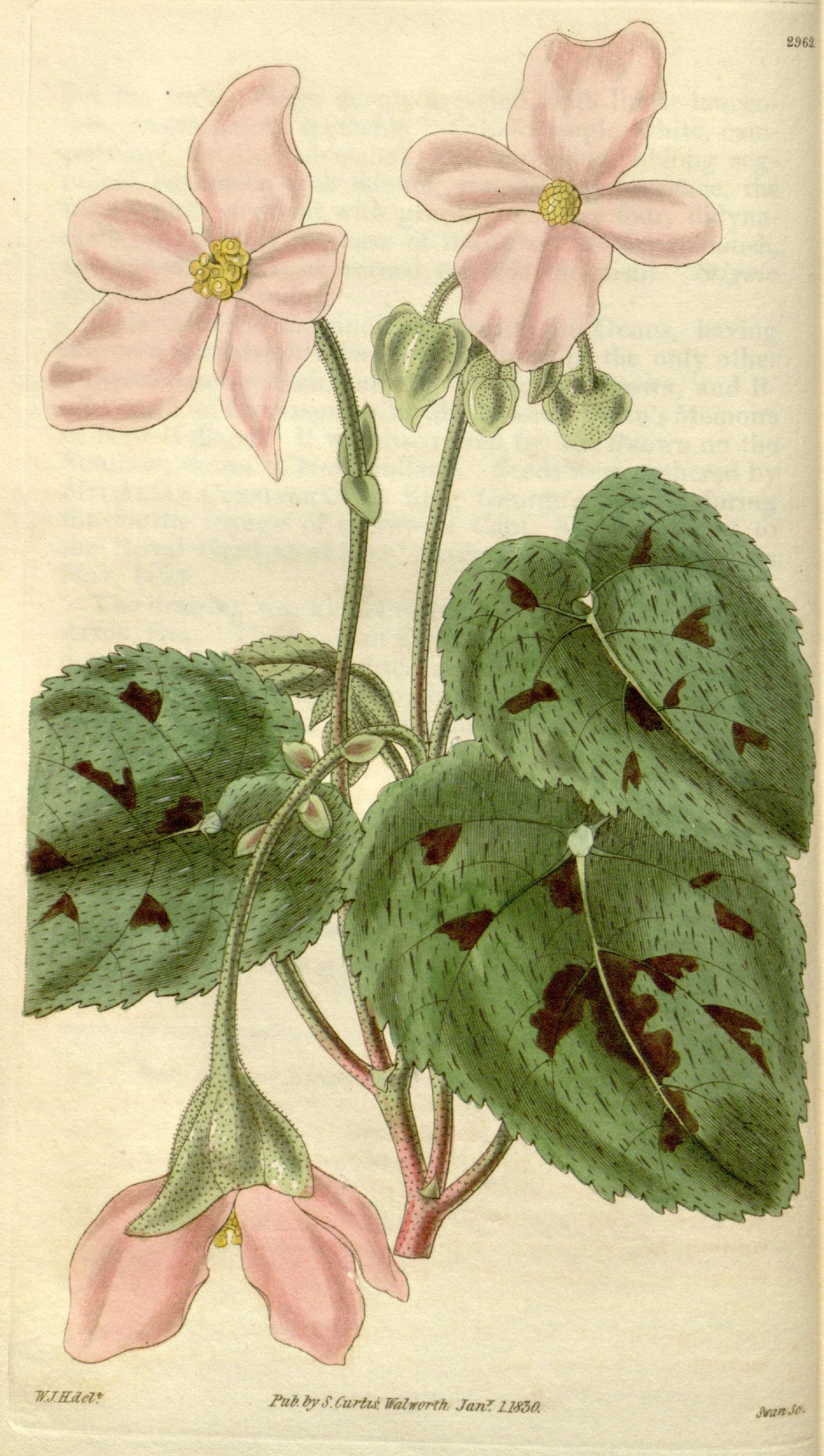
- Botanical illustration

Scientific classification
- Kingdom: Plantae
- Clade: Tracheophytes
- Clade: Angiosperms
- Clade: Eudicots
- Clade: Rosids
- Order: Cucurbitales
- Family: Begoniaceae
- Genus: Begonia
- Species: B. picta

Binomial name
- Begonia picta Sm.

Synonyms
- Begonia echinata Royle; Begonia obversa C.B.Clarke

= Begonia picta =

Species of flowering plant

Begonia picta, the painted leaf begonia, is a widespread species of flowering plant in the family Begoniaceae, native to the Himalayan region. It grows relatively high up in the foothills of the Himalayas, typically on shady slopes and moist ledges, and requires high humidity and warm temperatures in cultivation.
