= Mima, Nagaland =

Mima
- Village
- Interactive map of Mima
- Location of Mima Mima (India)
- Coordinates: 25.610241°N 94.144495°E
- Country: India
- Region: Northeast India
- State: Nagaland
- District: Kohima District

Government
  - Type: Village Council
  - Body: Mima Village Council

Population (2011)
  - Total: 2,149
- Time zone: UTC+5:30 (IST)
- Vehicle registration: NL-01
- Sex ratio: 1058 females per 1000 males ♂/♀

Mima is an Angami Naga village in the Kohima District of the Indian state of Nagaland.

== Demographics ==
According to the 2011 Census of India, Mima had a population of 2149 people living in 403 households. The population consisted of 1044 males and 1105 females.
