= Kiruphema Basa =

- Village
- Location of Kiruphema Basa Kiruphema Basa (India)
- Country: India
- State: Nagaland
- District: Kohima

Population (2011)
  - Total: 462

Languages
  - Official: English
- Time zone: UTC+5:30 (IST)
- Vehicle registration: NL-01
- Sex ratio: 893 ♂/♀

Kiruphema Basa is a village in Kohima district of Nagaland state of India. The total population of the village is about 462.
