= Chede Model Village =

- village
- Location of Chede Model Village Chede Model Village (India)
- Coordinates: 25.675°N 94.109°E
- Country: India
- State: Nagaland
- District: Kohima

Population (2011)
  - Total: 277

Languages
  - Official: English
- Time zone: UTC+5:30 (IST)
- Vehicle registration: NL-01
- Sex ratio: 1131 male/female

Chede Model Village is a village in Kohima district of Nagaland state of India.
