= Lampong Sheanghah =

- Village
- Interactive map of Lampong Sheanghah
- Coordinates: 26°43′19″N 95°01′45″E
- Country: India
- State: Nagaland
- District: Mon district
- Time zone: IST (UTC+5.30)
- PIN: 798621

Lampong Sheanghah (LS), a small village with about 120 households located in the Eastern part of Nagaland, India under Mon district. It is located twelve kilometers (7.5 miles) away from the district headquarter. The name 'Lampong' literally means 'junction' that connects Longwa village, the international border between India and Myanmar in the East, Assam in the West and Mon in the South-East. The distance between the village and the state capital Kohima is 354 km (and the nearest town of neighbouring state Sonari is 60 km far away).

== History ==
During the head hunting era in 1890s, some precious ornaments (gongs, elephant tusks etc.) were stolen from Mon Village. Those thieves were apprehended by Sheanghah Tangten Villagers and returned the stolen ornaments to Mon village. As a token of gratitude and appreciation, the people of Mon village invited the Sheanghah people to come and settle in their own backyard. Consequently, people from both Tangten and Sheanghah Chingnyu made a new settlement in the land of Mon Village under the name 'Lampong Sheanghah'. That's how the village came into being in Mon area descended from Sheanghah Chingnyu. The inhabitants of the village are called 'Thohah'.

== Religion ==
100% of the people profess Christianity (Baptist). Lampong Sheanghah Baptist Church (LSBC) came into being in 1971. LSBC celebrated its Golden Jubilee in December 2021.

== Demographics ==
The village has a population of around 900 out of the total 250,671 population of Mon District (2011 census). It is a small village with 130 households.

== Festivals ==
Aoleng Monyu, the biggest and main festival of Konyak-Naga community is being celebrated with great pomp and show every year from 1–6 April. This festival marks the end of winter and heralds the dawn of spring. The six-day-long festival is meant for relaxation and exuberance after completion of sowing of seeds in the jhum fields. Folk songs and feasts are an indispensable part of the festival.

Rhungnyu/Hongnyu is another important festival that is being celebrated by the villagers every year after the harvest of millets in the month of July–August.

Laorong festival is a thanksgiving celebration that is observed in September/October every year after completion of jhum harvest.

== Daily life ==
Around 99% practise shifting cultivation which is the chief occupation of the local population. Rice is the staple food. Other crops being grown include king chilli, maize, taro, cassava, and sweet potato.

The village is divided into four major colonies viz Chingkho, Chingtan, Chingjhong and Chinglen colony. Chingkho colony occupy the upper part of the village, Chingtan colony is the middle part of the village, Chingjhong is the lower part and Chinglen colony covers those area that extended from the old village area.

The village is also an educational hub for nearby villagers who cannot afford to study in towns in the high school level. There are two schools in the village. Government Primary School and a privately owned school, Langsa Hill School(LHS). It’s worth mentioning that LHS has secured cent percent results in HSLC exam (Under NBSE) in the last 8 years.

Langsa Hill Welfare Society, a non profit Organization under the Proprietorship of Mr.Wango Langsym caters to the educational and daily needs of the underprivileged children numbering 40.

== Tourist attractions ==
The Famous Cross located in the highest peak of the village, at the hilltop ‘Langsa Houng’ (Langsa Hill) offers an enchanting and scenic view of the neighbouring villages, Mon Headquarter, Assam, Arunachal Pradesh, the Longwa Village and Myanmar. One has to climb more than one thousand steps to reach the hilltop.

Chingpei Park is another place where kids can play sea-saw, swing, tramp etc.
