= Mongsenyimti =

- village
- Location in Nagaland, India Mongsenyimti (India)
- Coordinates: 26°26′N 94°37′E
- Country: India
- State: Nagaland

Languages
  - Official: English
- Time zone: UTC+5:30 (IST)
- Vehicle registration: NL
- Website: nagaland.gov.in

Perched at an altitude of 3,106 ft above sea level, Mongsenyimti is an Ao village located in Mokokchung District of Nagaland, a state located in the far north-eastern part of India. The main source of livelihood is agriculture.

The village has 300-500 families with community forests, clan forests, and jhum cultivation blocks. For subsistence, the villagers depend on 11 Jhum coupes to work on an 11-year rotation. The crops raised are rice, maize, chillies, gourd, cucumber, beans, sweet potato etc. Mongsenyimti village has two beautiful log drums.

The towns bounding Mongsenyimti are Khensa (15 km) in the west, Chuchuyimlang (3 km) in the North, Litim (12 km) in the east and Mokokchung (14 km) in the south. The village is linked by road to National Highway-2(Earlier NH-61). Mongsenyimti can be reached from Jorhat on route of National Highway-2 (5 hour drive), which is connected to both Kolkata and Guwahati by air.
