= Pfüchama =

- Village
- Interactive map of Pfüchama
- Location of Pfüchama Pfüchama (India)
- Coordinates: 25.642740°N 94.130147°E
- Country: India
- Region: Northeast India
- State: Nagaland
- District: Kohima District

Government
  - Type: Village Council
  - Body: Pfüchama Village Council

Population (2011)
  - Total: 870
- Time zone: UTC+5:30 (IST)
- PIN: 797120
- Vehicle registration: NL-01
- Sex ratio: 912 females per 1000 males ♂/♀

Pfüchama is an Angami Naga village in the Kohima District of the Indian state of Nagaland.

== Demographics ==
According to the 2011 Census of India, Pfüchama had a population of 870 people living in 181 households. The population consisted of 455 males and 415 females.
