= Langpangkong Range =

Mountain range in Nagaland, India

Geography
- Country: India
- State: Nagaland
- District: Mokokchung

The Langpangkong Range is a mountain range in Nagaland, India. It is one of the six major mountain ranges inhabited by the Ao people. It is located between the valleys of the Dikhu and Milak rivers in the Mokokchung District.

== History ==
King An Ahom, who escaped from his capital (the present-day Sibsagar in Assam) due to court intrigues and rivalries, is believed to have taken refuge here. The cave where he apparently took shelter still remains in the area.

== Geography ==
Tuli and Changtongya are the important towns of this range. National Highway 61 runs all along the top of the range.
