= Mokokchung district =

- District of Nagaland
- Nickname: Land of Pioneers
- Mokokchung District's location in Nagaland
- Interactive map of Mokokchung district
- Coordinates: 26.33°N 94.52°E
- Country: India
- State: Nagaland
- Seat: Mokokchung

Government
  - Assembly constituencies: 10 constituencies

Area
  - Total: 1,719 km^{2} (664 sq mi)

Population (2011)
  - Total: 194,622
  - Density: 113.2/km^{2} (293.2/sq mi)
- Time zone: UTC+05:30 (IST)
- ISO 3166 code: IN-NL-MK
- Major highways: NH 2, NH 202
- Website: http://mokokchung.nic.in/

Mokokchung district (/ˌmoʊkɒkˈtʃʌŋ/) is a district of Nagaland state in India. The town of Mokokchung is its headquarters. The district is the home of the Ao Nagas. It is bounded by the state of Assam to its north, Wokha District to its west, Tuensang District and Longleng District to its east, and Zünheboto District to its south.

== History ==
During the British rule over India, the Mokokchung area was part of the Naga Hills District of Assam. The Mokokchung subdivision of Naga Hills District was created in 1889, and it remained so following India's independence in 1947. Naga Hills District remained as a district of Assam until 1957, when it and Tuensang Frontier Division of the North-East Frontier Agency (now Arunachal Pradesh) were joined to form the centrally governed Naga Hills Tuensang Area. At that point Mokokchung subdivision became a district, one of three alongside Kohima and Tuensang districts.

February 1961 saw the renaming of Naga Hills Tuensang Area to "Nagaland", and in December 1963 Nagaland became the 16th state of India. Finally December 1973 saw the new districts of Zunheboto and Wokha carved out of Mokokchung, leaving the borders of Mokokchung district as they stand today.

== Geography ==
It covers an area of 1,615 km^{2} while accurately the total area of the district is 1719 km^{2} because of its long time border dispute with Assam. The physiography of the district shows six distinct hill ranges. The ranges are approximately parallel to each other and are aligned roughly north-east/south-west. The district lies between 94.29 and 94.76 degrees east longitude and 26.20 and 26.77 degrees north latitude. The entire district of Mokokchung is conveniently sub-divided into ranges. The main valleys are Tsurang, Changki and Milak Valleys. The district is agriculturally and industrially among the most progressive districts in the state, along with Chümoukedima, Dimapur and Kohima. Major agricultural regions are Changki-Longnak, Tsurang, Milak and Dikhu valley regions. Tuli-Milak region and Changki-Longnak valley are the major industrial areas.

=== Major mountain ranges ===
- Ongpangkong
- Asetkong
- Jangpetkong
- Japukong
- Langpangkong
- Tzürangkong

=== Land use ===
Category	Area (km^{2})
Total land	1719
Forest Department purchased land	49.66
Agriculture	180.39
Villages and towns	10.50
Horticulture	8.12
Different development departments	386.07
Degraded land	982.62

== Administration ==
Mokokchung district's administrative headquarters with its Indian Administrative Service (IAS) cadre is located at Mokokchung town. The Deputy Commissioner, also in Mokokchung town, is the head of the district.

The district has four subdivisions, Mokokchung, Tuli, Mangkolemba and Changtongya, and nine administrative/revenue circles - Ongpangkong, Tuli, Chuchuyimlang, Changtongya, Mangkolemba, Kubolong, Alongkima, Longchem and Merangmen.

The sub-division of Mokokchung town is administered directly by the Deputy Commissioner and one Sub-Divisional Officer; Additional Deputy Commissioner (ADC) offices are located in the sub-divisions of Mangkolemba and Tuli administrative circles; a Sub-Divisional Officer is located in the sub-division of Changtongya circle, and Extra Assistant Commissioner EAC headquarters are located in the six remaining circles of Ongpangkong, Kubolong, Chuchuyimlang, Alongkima, Longchem and Merangmen.

There are six Rural Development Blocks (RDBs) in the district. Longchem and Kubolong circles each have their own RDB; whereas Alongkima, Mangkolemba and Merangmen constitute the Mangkolemba RDB; Tuli, Changtongya and Chuchuyimlang constitute the Changtongya RDB. The 19 villages of Ongpangkong are split between RDBs Ongpangkong North and Ongpangkong South.

=== Assembly constituencies ===
Mokokchung elects ten members to the 60-seat Nagaland Legislative Assembly. The constituencies are Alongtaki, Jangpetkong, Impur, Angetyongpang, Koridang, Aonglenden, Mokokchung Town, Mongoya, Tuli and Arkakong. As of the 2018 Nagaland Legislative Assembly election, all of its legislators are in the ruling United Democratic Alliance government.

== Demographics ==
According to the 2011 census Mokokchung district has a population of 194,622. This gives it a ranking of 591st in India (out of a total of 640), Mokokchung has a sex ratio of 925 females for every 1000 males, and a literacy rate of 91.6%.

The Chungli Ao is the main language of the Aos followed by Mongsen Ao and Changki Ao languages.

District's literacy rate of 84.6% (2001 census) is the highest in the state and one of the highest in the entire country. The district has been declared a fully literate district in 2007, to become Nagaland's first 100 percent literate district. With 1004 females for every 1000 males, it has the 7th highest female:male sex ratio among the 538 districts of India in the 0-6 age group population (2001 census).

=== Urbanization ===
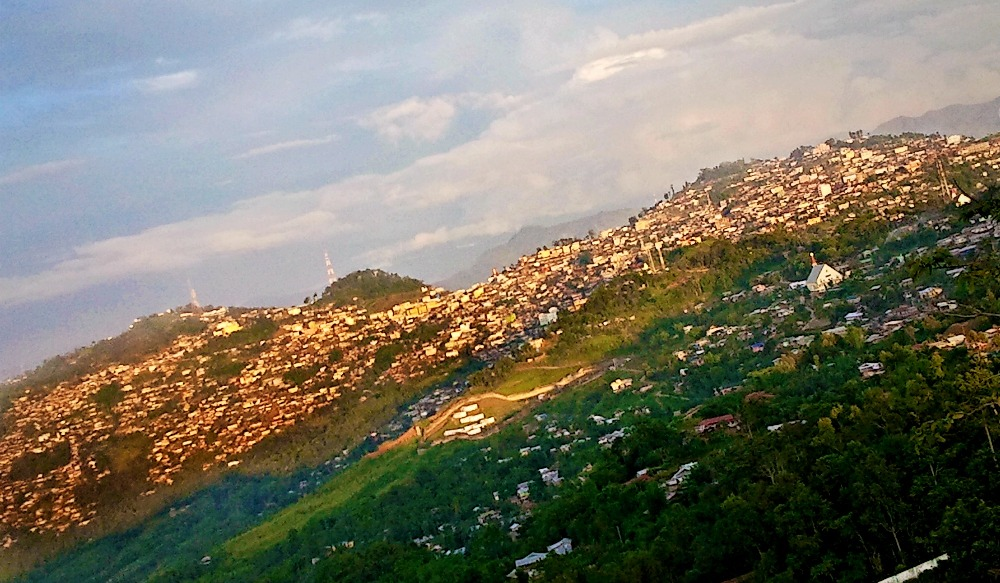
Mokokchung, Nagaland

The only urban areas of the district listed at the last census were Mokokchung (35,913), Tuli town (7,864), Changtongya (7,532) and Tsudikong (4,416). Despite the census not listing any metro areas, the District Administration describes the urban spread of Mokokchung town to the nearby towns and villages as a metropolitan area. This zone is said to include Chuchuyimpang, Mokokchung Village, Khensa, Ungma, Alichen and DEF colony.

=== Towns and villages ===
Ongpangkong circle comprises the one town (and population) of Mokokchung Municipal Committee (35,913), and the nineteen villages of Ungma (9,443), Mokokchung Village (5,338), Chungtia (4,661), Alichen (4,198), Mangmetong (4,159), Longmisa (3,962), Longkhum (3,811), Chuchuyimpang (3,774), Longsa (3,206), Khensa (1,447), Aliba (1,045), Kupza (912), Kinunger (501), Settsu (497), Mekuli (280), Longjongkong (228), Chubayimkum (190), Moalenden (124), Meyilong (108).

Tuli circle comprises the two towns (and population) of Tuli Town Committee (7,864) and Tsudikong Census Town (4,416), and the eleven villages of Kangtsung (3,008), Merangkong (2,562), Asangma (1,593), Anaki (840), Wamaken (625), Aopenzu (558), Kangtsung Yimsen (478), Anakiyimsen (473), Merangkong Comp. (456), Anaki 'C' (400), Wamakenyimsen (104).

Chuchuyimlang circle comprises the eleven villages of Chuchuyimlang Vill. (5,674), Mongsenyimti (2,867), Chuchuyimlang (2,132), Chakpa (1,604), Longkong (1,259), Yaongyimti (999), Salulemang (953), Yisemyong Comp. (909), Mongsenyimti Comp. (779), Yaongyimti (437), Phangsang Comp. (219).

Changtongya circle comprises the one town (and population) of Changtongya Town Committee (7,532), and the nineteen villages of Yaongyimsen (3,080), Changtongya (2,248), Unger (1,394), Akhoia (1,123), Yaongyimsen Comp. (1,062), Changtongya (478), Kilingmen (455).

Mangkolemba circle comprises the thirteen villages of Mangkolemba Hq (3,713), Khar (3,614), Changki (2,486), Longnak (768), Japu (487), Longsemdang (369), Chungliyimsen (337), Longtho (267), Atuphumi (257), Satsukba (242), Shihaphumi (206), Merakiong (175), Puneboto Comp. (36).

Kobulong circle comprises the ten villages of Sungratsu (3,590), Longjang (3,504), Mopungchuket (3,072), Longpa (602), Kubolong Hq (517), Impur Mission Centre (458), Alongchen Comp. (374), Yimchalu (197), Khanimu (184), Chami (181).

Alongkima circle comprises the ten villages of Molungkimong (2,816), Molungyimsen (2,650), Waromong (2,132), Yimjenkimong (1,420), Molungyimsen 'B' (1,099), Dibuia (538), Mongchen (485), Alongkima Hq (333), Dibuia Comp. (269), Waromong Comp. (205).

Longchem circle comprises the sixteen villages of Yajang 'C' (1,690), Nokpu (1,380), Longchem Comp. (699), Lirmen (671), Yajang 'A' (653), Saring (581), Tsurmen (529), Lakhuni (503), Changdang (498), Akumen (354), Aonokpu (290), Yajang 'B' (260), Alongtaki Comp. (204), Aonokpuyimsen (158), Yajang Model Vill. (109), Lizo Model Vill. (38).

Merangmen circle comprises the ten villages of Chungtiayimsen (1,839), Longphayimsen (1,548), Moayimti (841), Watiyim (728), Medemyim (335), Aosenden (246), Aosungkum (217), Aokum (116), Vikuto (114), Tsutapela (60).

=== Religion ===
Religion in Mokokchung District (2011)
1. Christianity (93.4%)
2. Hinduism (5.06%)
3. Islam (1.06%)
4. Buddhism (0.23%)
5. Sikhism (0.04%)
6. Jainism (0.03%)
7. Not stated (0.15%)

According to the 2011 official census, Christianity is major religion in Mokokchung District with 181.847 Christians (93.44%), 9.840 Hindus (5.06%), 2.057 Muslims (1.06%), 442 Buddhists (0.23%), 78 Sikhs (0.04%), 66 Jains (0.03%), 6 did Other (<0.01%) and 286 did not answer (0.15%).

== Economy ==
The main industrial regions of the district are the Changki Valley, Tsurang Valley, Lower Milak-Tuli Region and the Dikhu-Chichung Valley.

The main agricultural products of the district are Rice, Maize, Tomatoes, Passion Fruit, and Oranges.

The education sector comprises 42 primary, middle and high government schools, 10 private schools, Two government colleges and two private Colleges .

== Culture ==
The Moatsü and Tsüngremong festivals are celebrated greatly in Mokokchung District.

=== Media ===
- All India Radio, Mokokchung
- Tir Yimyim (daily newspaper in Ao)
- Lenjeter (monthly magazine in Ao)
- Mokokchung Times (daily newspaper)
