= Longleng =

Longleng Yongleng
- Town
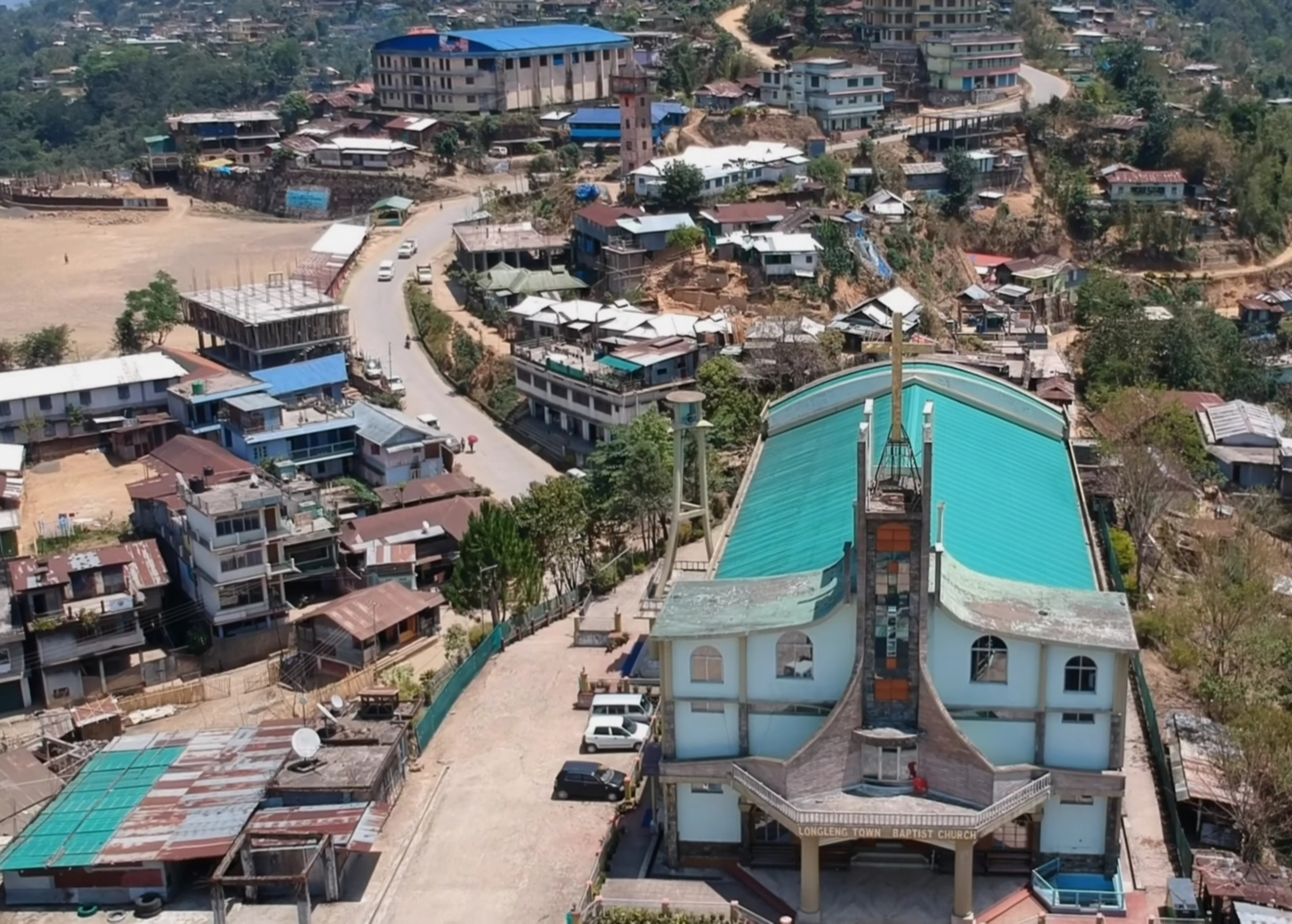
- View of Longleng Town Baptist Church & townscape

- Location in Nagaland Longleng (India)
- Coordinates: 26.4685°N 94.8092°E
- Country: India
- State: Nagaland
- District: Longleng District
- Elevation: 1,066 m (3,497 ft)

Languages
  - Official: English
  - Major language: Phom
- Time zone: UTC+5:30 (IST)
- Postal code: 798625
- Vehicle registration: NL
- Website: nagaland.gov.in

Longleng (/ˈlɒŋˌlɛŋ/) is a town in the state of Nagaland. It is the headquarters of the Longleng District. The town is inhabited by the Phom Nagas with Phom as the main dialect spoken by the people.
