= Lake Shilloi =

Natural Lake in Meluri District, Nagaland

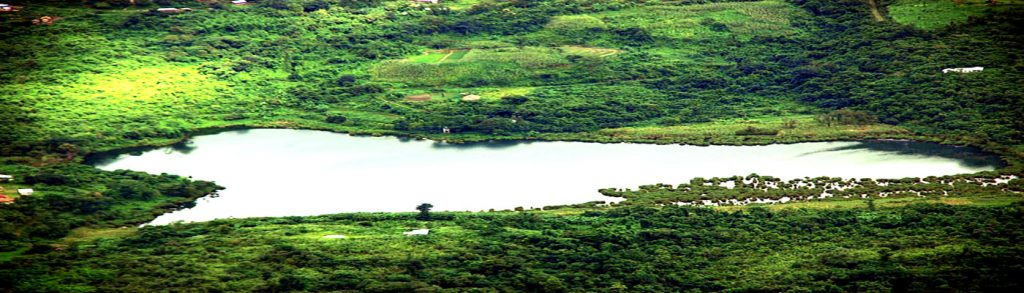
- Lake Shilloi, as seen from the east shore

- Location within Nagaland
- Location: Lütsam, Meluri District, Nagaland, India
- Coordinates: 25.595379°N 94.793029°E
- Type: Natural lake
- Primary inflows: none
- Primary outflows: evaporation
- Basin countries: India
- Max. length: 450 m (1,480 ft)
- Max. width: 270 m (890 ft)
- Surface area: 82,000 m^{2} (882,641 sq ft)
- Max. depth: 4 m (13 ft)
- Shore length^{1}: 1.40 km (0.87 mi)
- Surface elevation: 962 m (3,156 ft)
- Islands: none
- Settlements: Lütsam
- ^{1} Shore length is not a well-defined measure.

Lake Shilloi is a natural lake in the Meluri District of the Indian state of Nagaland. It is the largest natural lake in Nagaland. The lake falls in a valley surrounded with pine forests.

== Name ==
The name of the lake is originally Lütsam meaning ‘a place where water is collected’. It was known as Shiloh by the British during the British era but today it is officially known as Shilloi.

== See also ==
- Loho Lake
