= Meluri =

Town in the Indian state of Nagaland

Meluri Müluori
- Town
- Interactive map of Meluri
- Location in Nagaland, India Meluri (India) Meluri (Asia) Meluri (Earth)
- Coordinates: 25.683665°N 94.626038°E
- Country: India
- Region: Northeast India
- State: Nagaland
- District: Meluri District

Government
  - Type: Town Council
  - Body: Meluri Town Council
  - Chairperson: Chulekhu Nyusou (Naga People's Front)
  - Deputy Chairperson: Z. Porhutho Ngouri (Naga People's Front)

Population (2011)
  - Total: 5,191

Languages
  - Official: English
  - Major language: Pochuri
- Time zone: UTC+5:30 (IST)
- PIN: 797114
- Telephone code: 03865
- Sex ratio: 931 ♂/♀
- Climate: Temperate (Köppen)
- Website: nagaland.gov.in

Meluri (Pochuri: Müluori), is a town and the administrative seat of Meluri District in the Indian state of Nagaland.
