= Longleng district =

- District of Nagaland
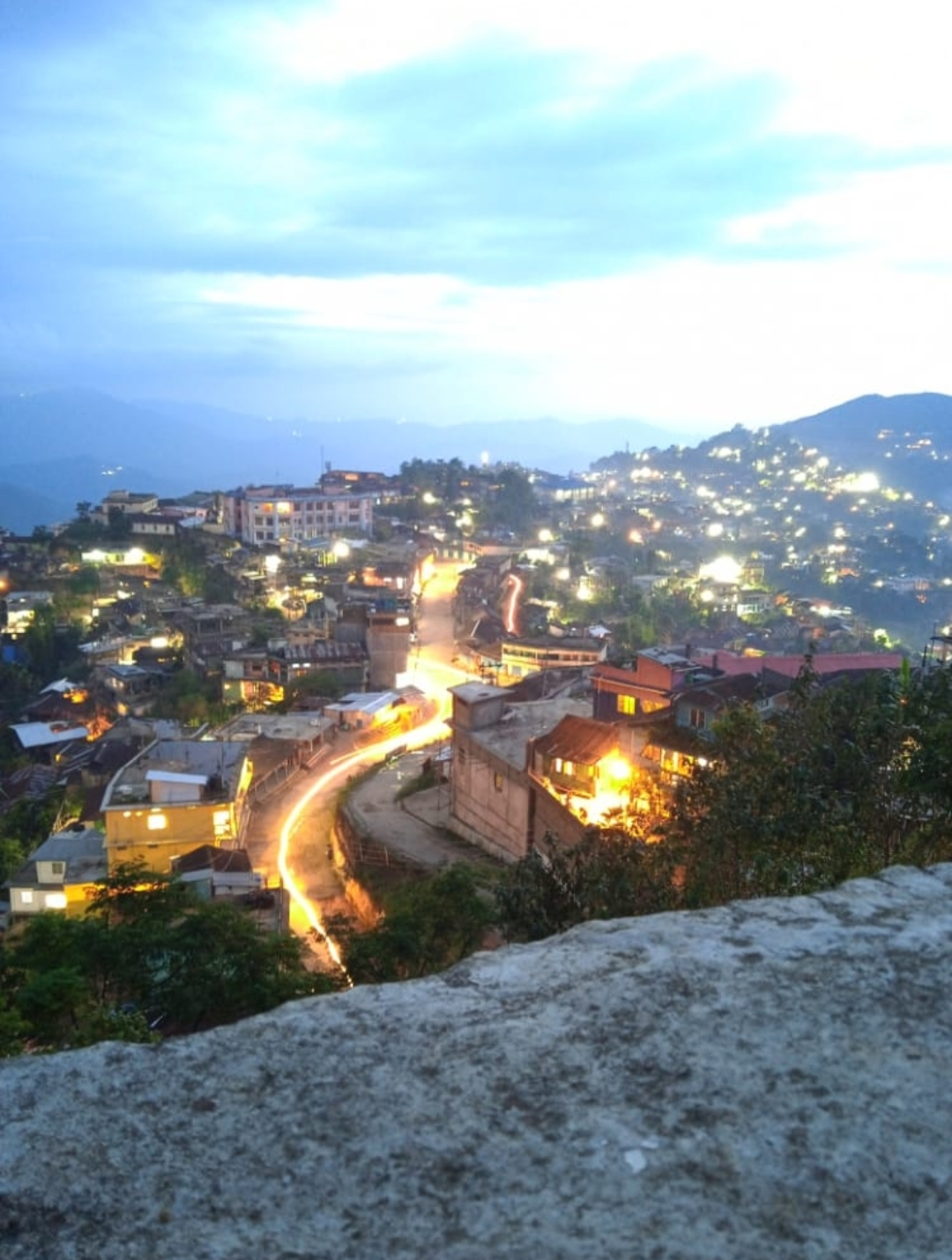
- Longleng Town at Dusk
- Nicknames: Handicraft district & land of clouds
- Longleng District's location in Nagaland
- Interactive map of Longleng district
- Coordinates: 26.492°N 94.808°E
- Country: India
- State: Nagaland
- Seat: Longleng

Government
  - Assembly constituencies: 2 constituencies

Area
  - Total: 885.80 km^{2} (342.01 sq mi)

Population (2011)
  - Total: 50,593
  - Density: 57.116/km^{2} (147.93/sq mi)
- Time zone: UTC+05:30 (IST)
- ISO 3166 code: IN-NL
- Major highways: NH 702, NH 702B
- Website: longleng.nic.in

Longleng district (/ˈlɒŋˌlɛŋ/) is located in the northern part of the Indian state of Nagaland. Characterized by its hilly terrain, it is home to the Phom Nagas. Its headquarter is the Longleng town. The boundary of the district is well demarcated by natural rivers such as the Dikhu and Yungnyiü river. It is bounded by Mon district in the east; Assam in the north; Tuensang district in the south; and Mokokchung district in the west. The mount Yingnyiüshang in the south-eastern part of the district with an approximate height of 2500 meters above sea level is the highest peak.

The Yingnyiü mount is identified as biodiversity hotspot: it hosts species-rich tropical rain forest and supports diverse flora and fauna. It has the distinction of being one of the few places in Nagaland where virgin forests are still found. Along the sides of Dikhu river and Yongam River there are a number of tourist attractions for fishing and picnicking.

== Geography ==
Carved out of Tuensang district, Longleng is the tenth district of Nagaland. It is bordered by Mon District to the east, Mokokchung District to the west and Tuensang District to the south. The district's headquarters is at Longleng, which is located at an altitude of about 1,066 m above sea level. Tamlu and Longleng are the major towns of the district. Its main river is the Dikhu River.

== Demographics ==
According to the 2011 census Longleng District has a population of 50,484, roughly equal to the nation of Saint Kitts and Nevis. This gives it a ranking of 632nd in India (out of a total of 640). Longleng has a sex ratio of 903 females for every 1000 males, and a literacy rate of 73.1%. Scheduled Tribes make up 96.30% of the population. 15.08% of the population lives in urban areas.

=== Religion ===
Religions in Longleng district (2011)
Religion	Percent
Christianity	96.76%
Hinduism	1.73%
Islam	1.26%
Other or not stated	0.25%
Distribution of religions

According to the 2011 official census, Christianity is the major religion in Longleng District with 48.849 Christians (96.76%), following by 873 Hindus (1.73%), 635 Muslims (1.26%), 77 Buddhists (0.15%), 5 Sikhs (<0.01%) and Not stated 45 (0.09%).

=== Language ===
At the time of the 2011 census, 93.68% of the population spoke Phom and the remaining spoke various similar dialects.

== Banking facilities in Longleng ==
List of banks functioning in Longleng.

- State Bank Of India, Longleng
