= Phom people =

Naga ethnic group native to the Northeast Indian state of Nagaland

Phom Naga
Total population
- 54,416 (2011)
- Nagaland, India

Languages
- Phom language

Religion
- Protestantism

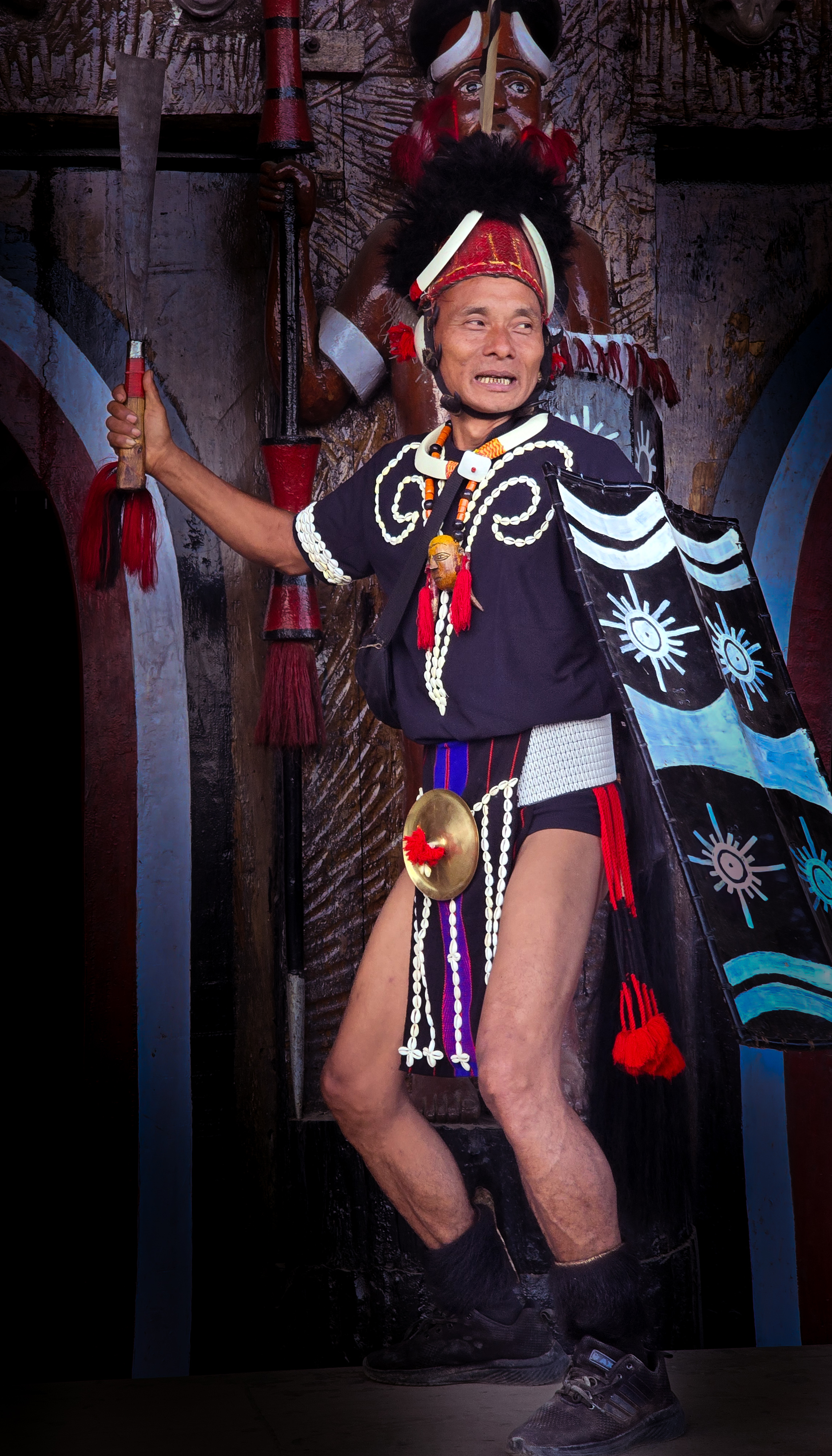
A Phom artist is performing at the Hornbill Festival, 2025

The Phoms are a major Naga ethnic group native to the Northeast Indian state of Nagaland. Their traditional territory lies between the territories of Konyak in the north-east, the Ao in the west and the Chang in the south. Phoms celebrate several festivals in a year of which Monyiü is the biggest. It is celebrated from April 1 to 6 every year. Other traditional festivals include Moha, Bongvüm and Paangmo. They primarily inhabit the Longleng District.

A distinguished traditional Phom dish called 'Anphet' is famed among the community. It is especially made during the Monyiü festival and is of great cultural importance. One of the most significant occasion of the Phom Nagas is the celebration of "Phom Day" on June 6. It is celebrated every year commemorating the Peace Making Day that was signed on June 6, 1952, marking an end to all head hunting practices and enmity among the Phom Nagas. This day is also declared as public holiday for the Phoms by the state government.

== Economy ==
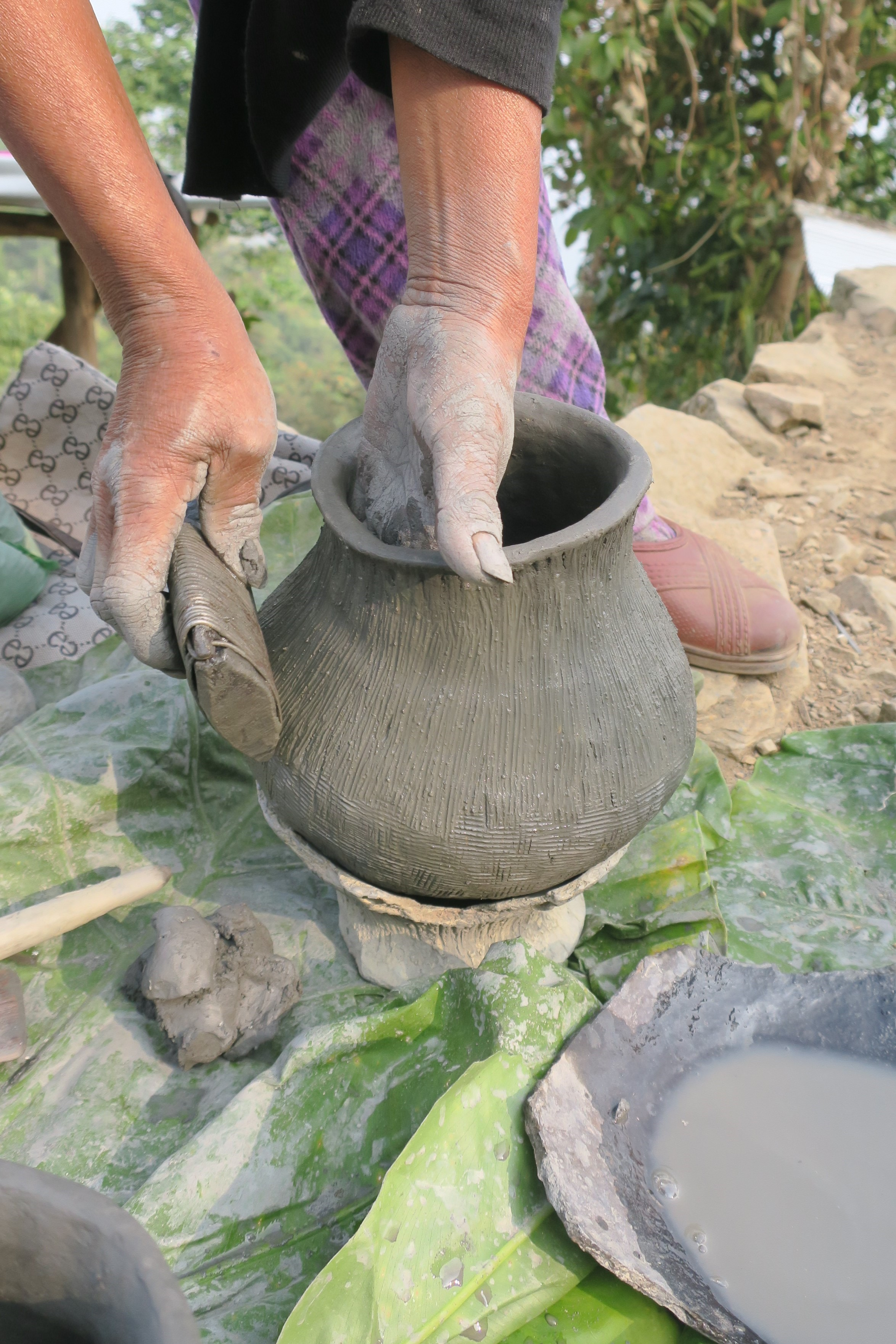
Traditional pottery of the Phom Nagas.

Agriculture is the traditional occupation of the Phoms. They practices jhum cultivation. The Phoms also have a tradition of pottery, bamboo work and spinning.

== Origin ==
The origin of the Phoms, like that of other Naga people, is uncertain. Some folklores similar to that of the Ao Nagas, states that their ancestors originated from stones. They also believe that their great ancestors lived in Yingnyiüshang (a mountain in Longleng) and separated to different villages following a saga in the Yingnyiü hills significant to the Phom's history.

== Culture ==
Phom culture, tradition and language is closely related to the Konyak Nagas of Nagaland and the Wancho Nagas of Arunachal Pradesh.

=== Clothing ===
After the advent of Christianity, many modern Phoms have adopted contemporary clothing, though traditional dress is worn during festivals. The traditional Phom dressing was indicative of the social status of the wearer. The ordinary clothing included a white (vihe-ashak) or a dark blue (nempong-ashak) shawl-like body wrap. A man who had taken a head or offered feasts had the privilege to wear a cowrie-ornamented shawl (fanet-henyü). The women used to wear skirts called shung-nang, which came in different colors, designs and bands.

=== Practices ===
Before arrival of Christianity, like the Konyaks and the Chang, they used to expose the dead bodies on raised platforms instead of burying them.

== Festivals ==
The Phoms have four major festivals, the most important of which is Monyü. The others are Moha, Bongvüm and Paangmo.

=== Monyiü ===
Monyü is the most important traditional festival of the Phoms. It is a 12-day festival, which marks the end of winter and onset of summer (usually 1–6 April). The festival involves community feasting, dancing, singing and social work (such as repairs and construction of bridges). During the festival, the men present their married daughters or sisters with pure rice beer and special food to show their affection and respect.

One or two days before the festival, its arrival is signaled by beating log drums with a distinct tune called Lan Nyangshem. The priests or the village elders predict whether the festival would bring a blessing or a curse.

Day 1 (Shongten-Laiphen)
Overall preparation is done for the festivities. Households participate in collection of wrapping leaves and bamboos.

Day 2
Brewing of rice beer.

Day 3 (Aiha Okshok)
Feasting, dancing and merry-making.

The second day is for compulsory brewing of all kinds of rice beer.

Day 4 (Chingi Okshok)
General festivity and arrival of guests from neighbouring villages.

Day 5 (Paangmohah)
Parties of men wear colorful costumes and indulge in drinking, dancing and celebrating with friends.

Day 6
Elders feast by exchanging pure rice beer and meat. The young villagers feast together at the outskirts of the village.
