= Nagaland =

State in northeastern India

- State
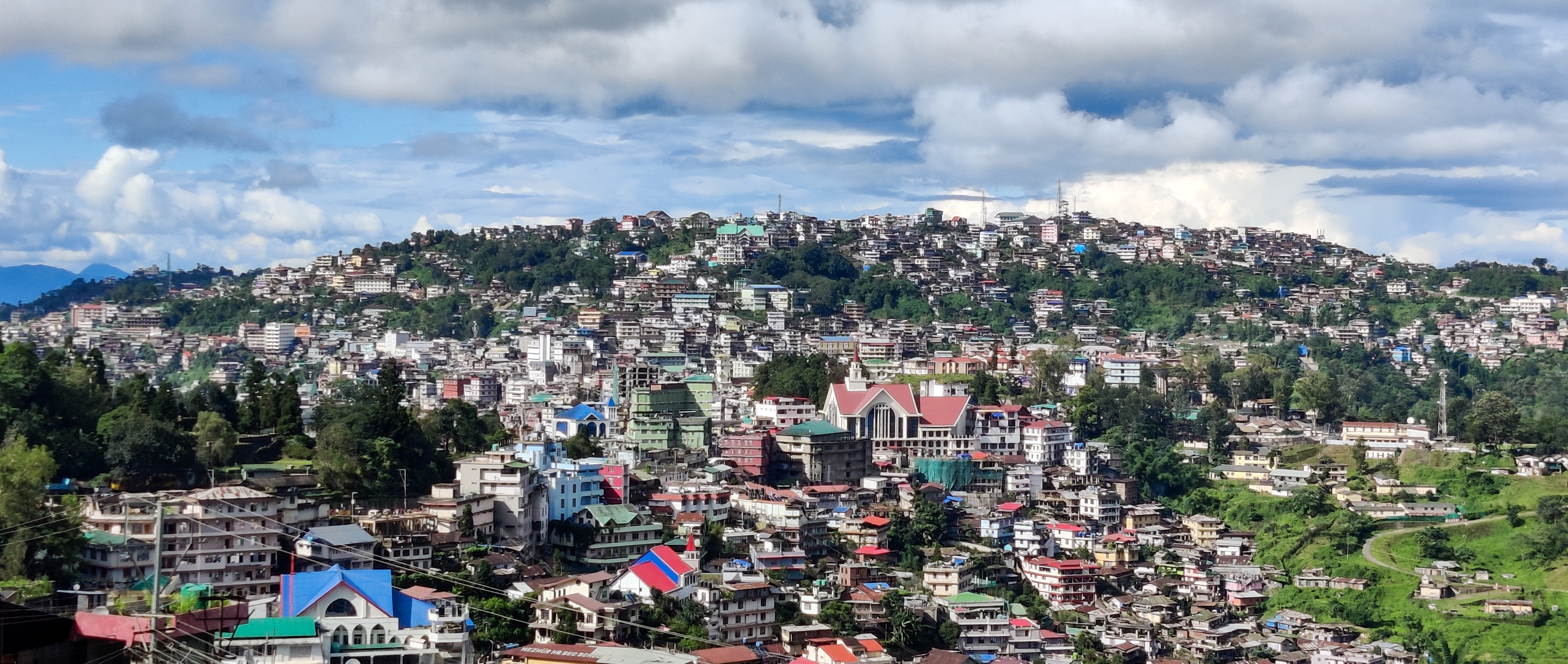
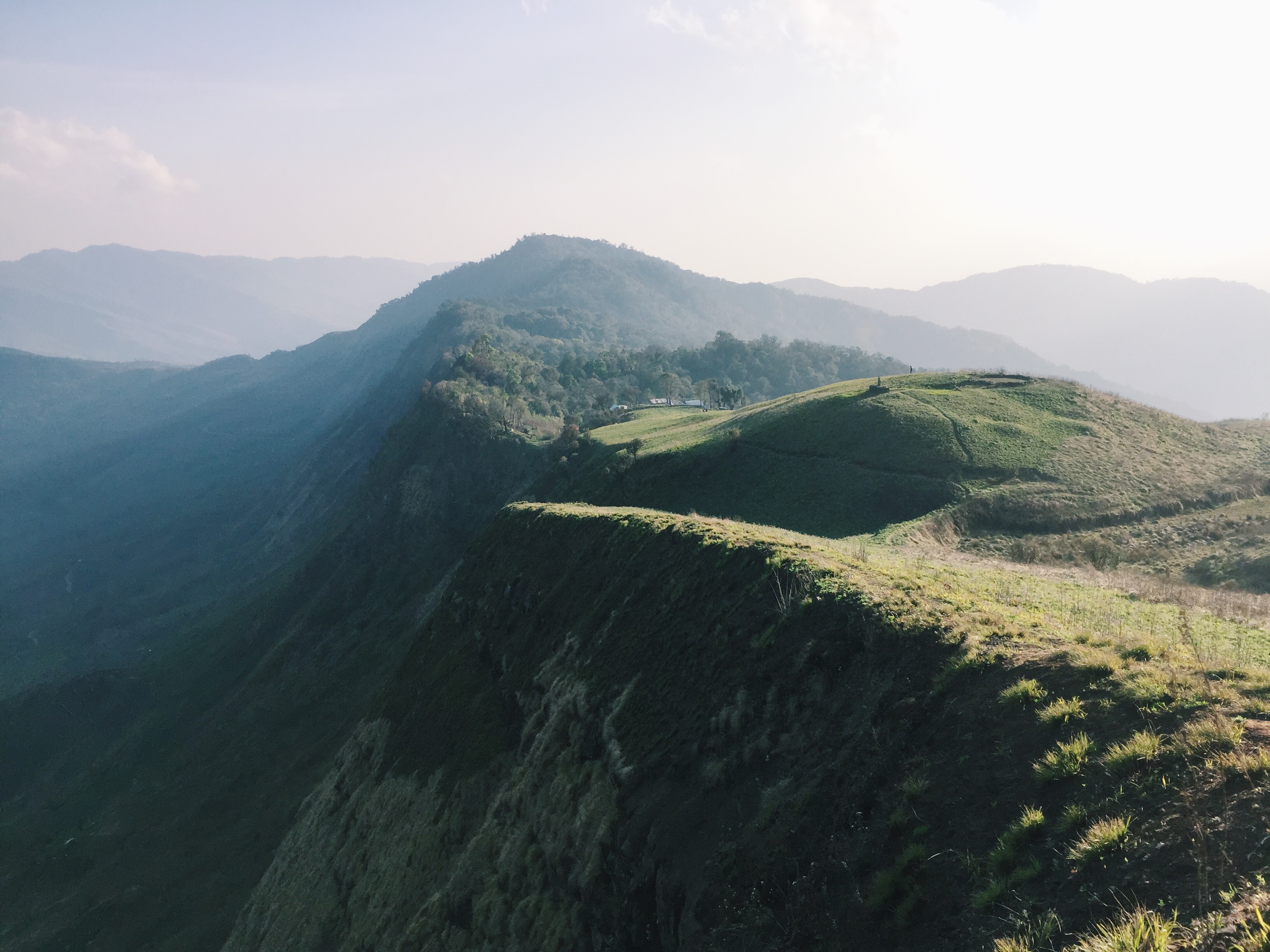
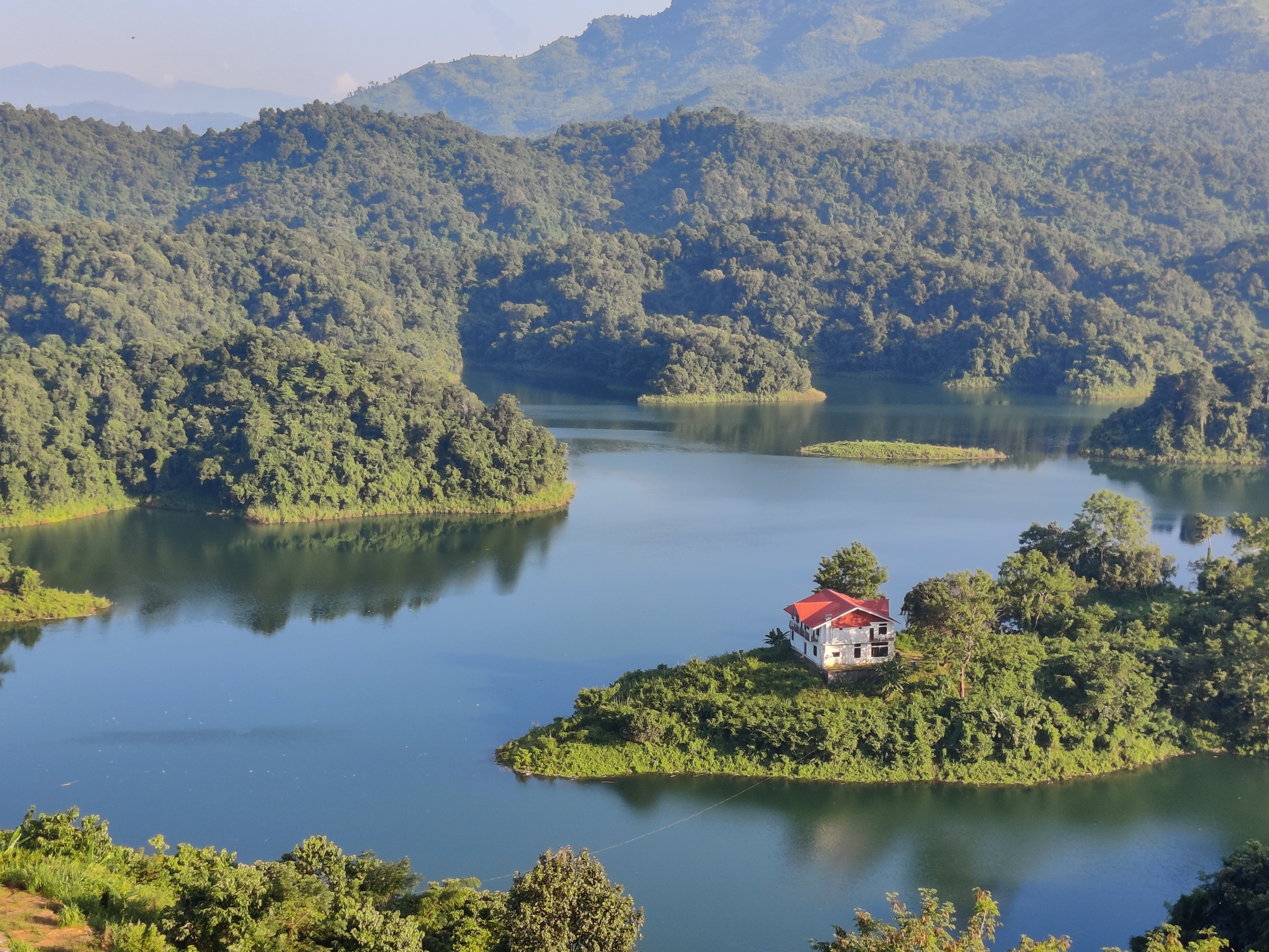
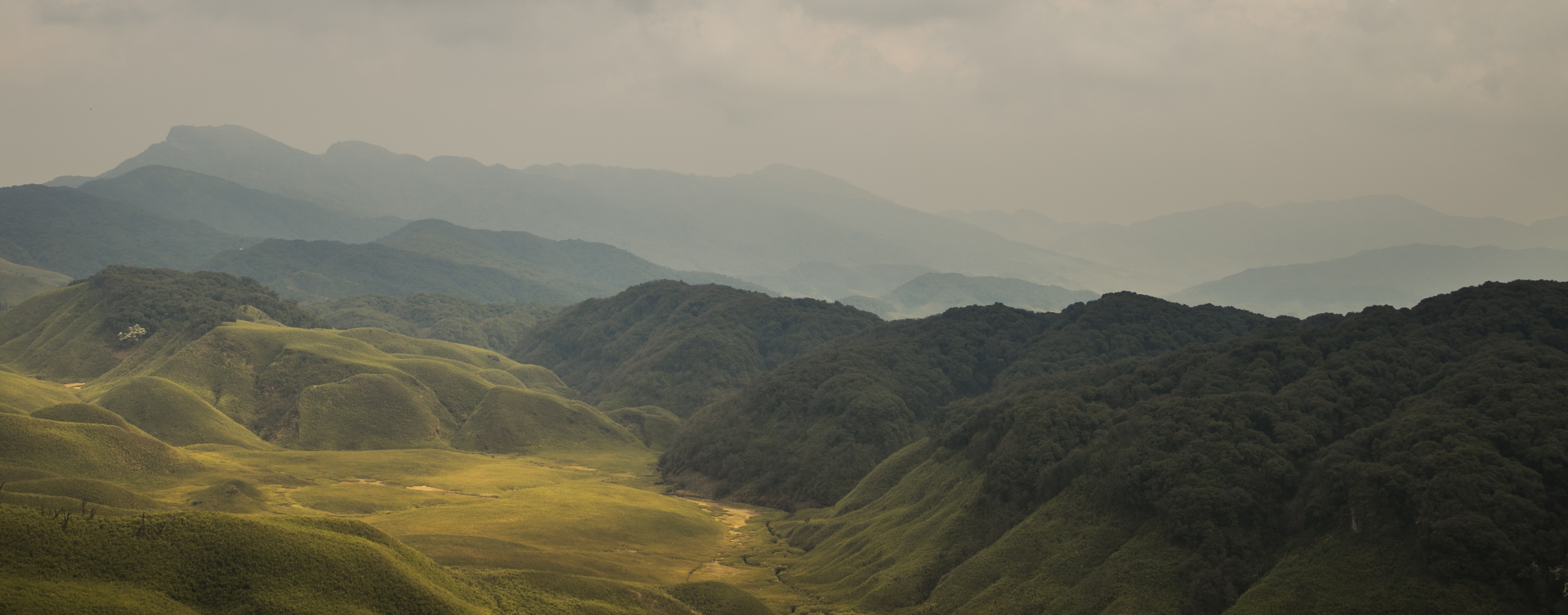
- Kohima Kapamüdzü Peak Doyang Western Dzüko Valley

- Emblem of Nagaland
- Etymology: "Land of the Nagas"
- Nickname(s): Land of Festivals, Falcon Capital of the World
- Motto: "Unity"
- Anthem: "God Bless Nagaland"
- Location of Nagaland in India
- Coordinates: 25.67°N 94.12°E
- Country: India
- Region: Northeast India
- Previously was: Part of Assam
- As state: 1 December 1963
- Capital: Kohima
- Largest city: Dimapur
- Districts: 17

Government
  - Body: Government of Nagaland
  - Governor: Nand Kishore Yadav
  - Chief Minister: Neiphiu Rio (NPF)
  - Deputy Chief Minister: T. R. Zeliang (NPF); Yanthungo Patton (BJP)

Area
  - Total: 16,579 km^{2} (6,401 sq mi)
  - Rank: 25th
- Highest elevation (Mount Saramati): 3,826 m (12,552 ft)
- Lowest elevation (Dhansiri River): 140 m (460 ft)

Population (2011)
  - Total: ▼1,978,502
  - Rank: 26th
  - Density: 119/km^{2} (310/sq mi)
  - Urban: 28.86%
  - Rural: 71.14%
- Demonym: Nagas

Language
  - Official: English
  - Official script: Latin script

GDP
  - Total (2026–27): ▲₹48,500 crore (US$5.0 billion) (nominal) ▲ ~US$23.80 billion (PPP)
  - Rank: 30th
  - Per capita: ▲₹192,282 (US$2,000) (nominal) (2025–26) ▲ ~US$9,465 (PPP) (27th)
- Time zone: UTC+05:30 (IST)
- ISO 3166 code: IN-NL
- Vehicle registration: NL
- HDI (2022): ▲0.679 medium (19th)
- Literacy (2024): 95.7% (3rd)
- Sex ratio (2011): 931♀/1000 ♂ (21st)
- Website: nagaland.gov.in
- Symbols of Nagaland
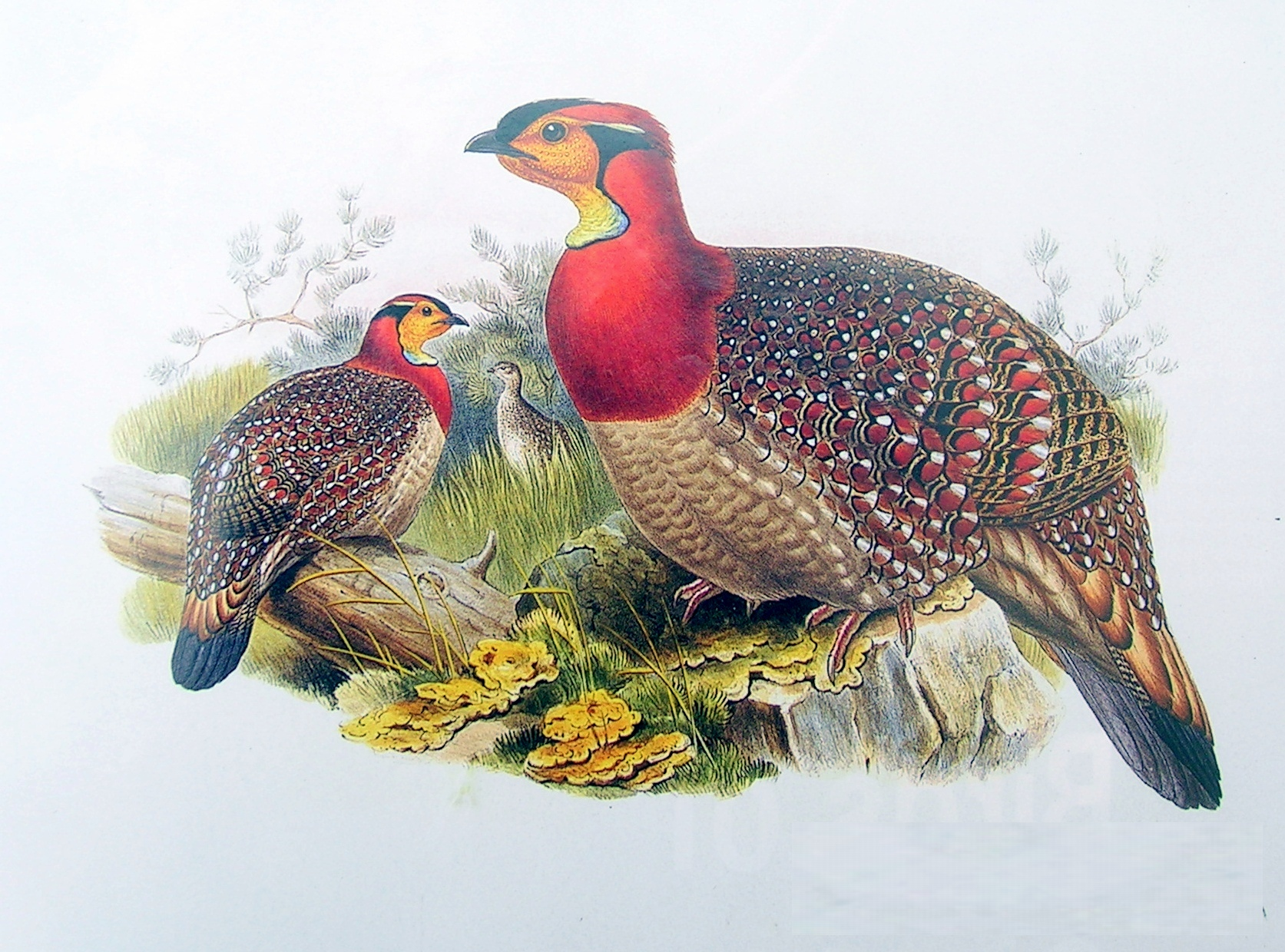
- Bird: Blyth's tragopan

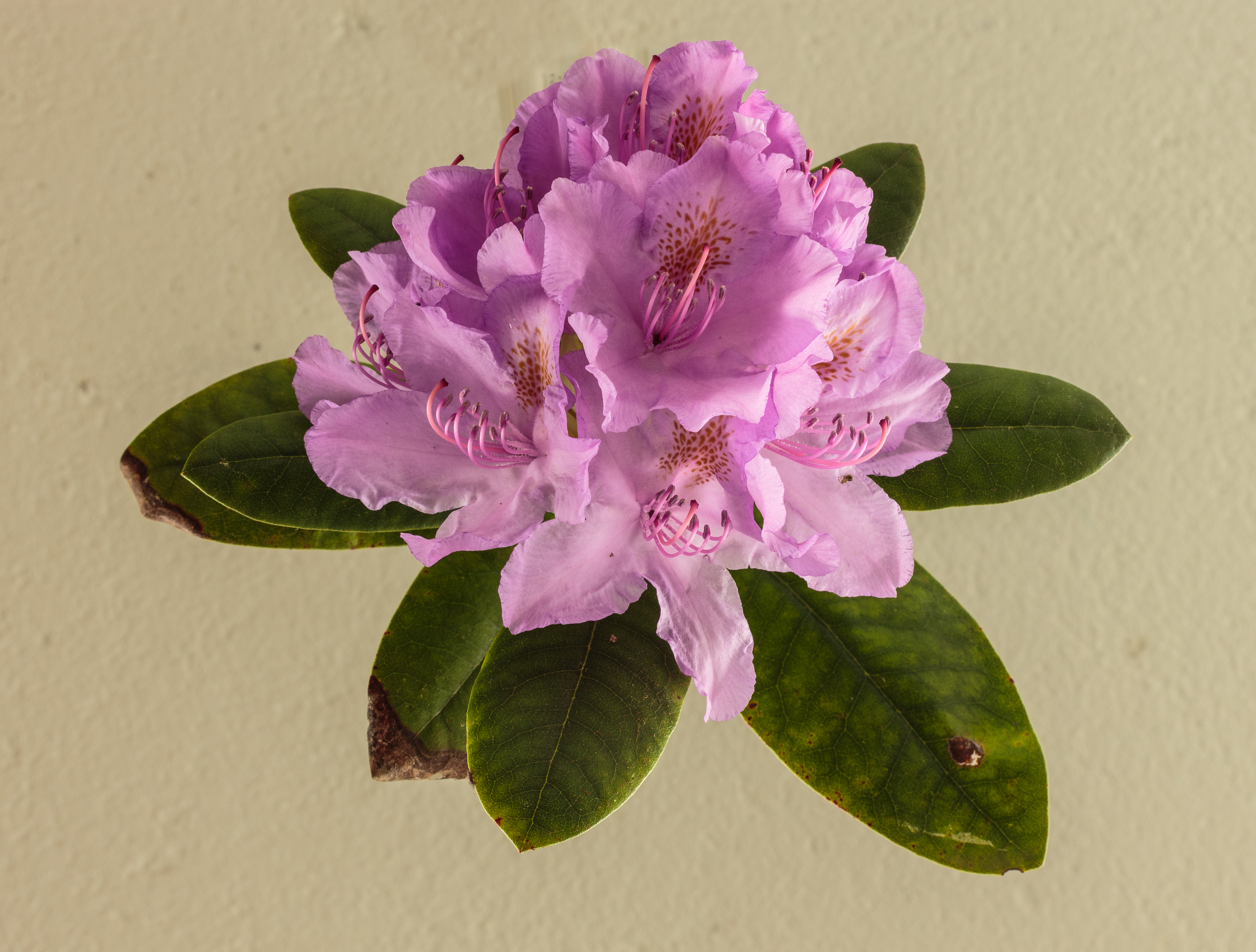
- Flower: Rhododendron

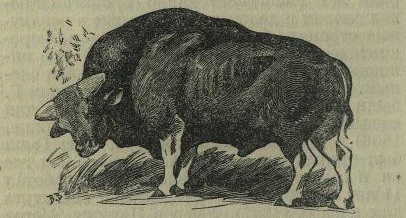
- Mammal: Mithun

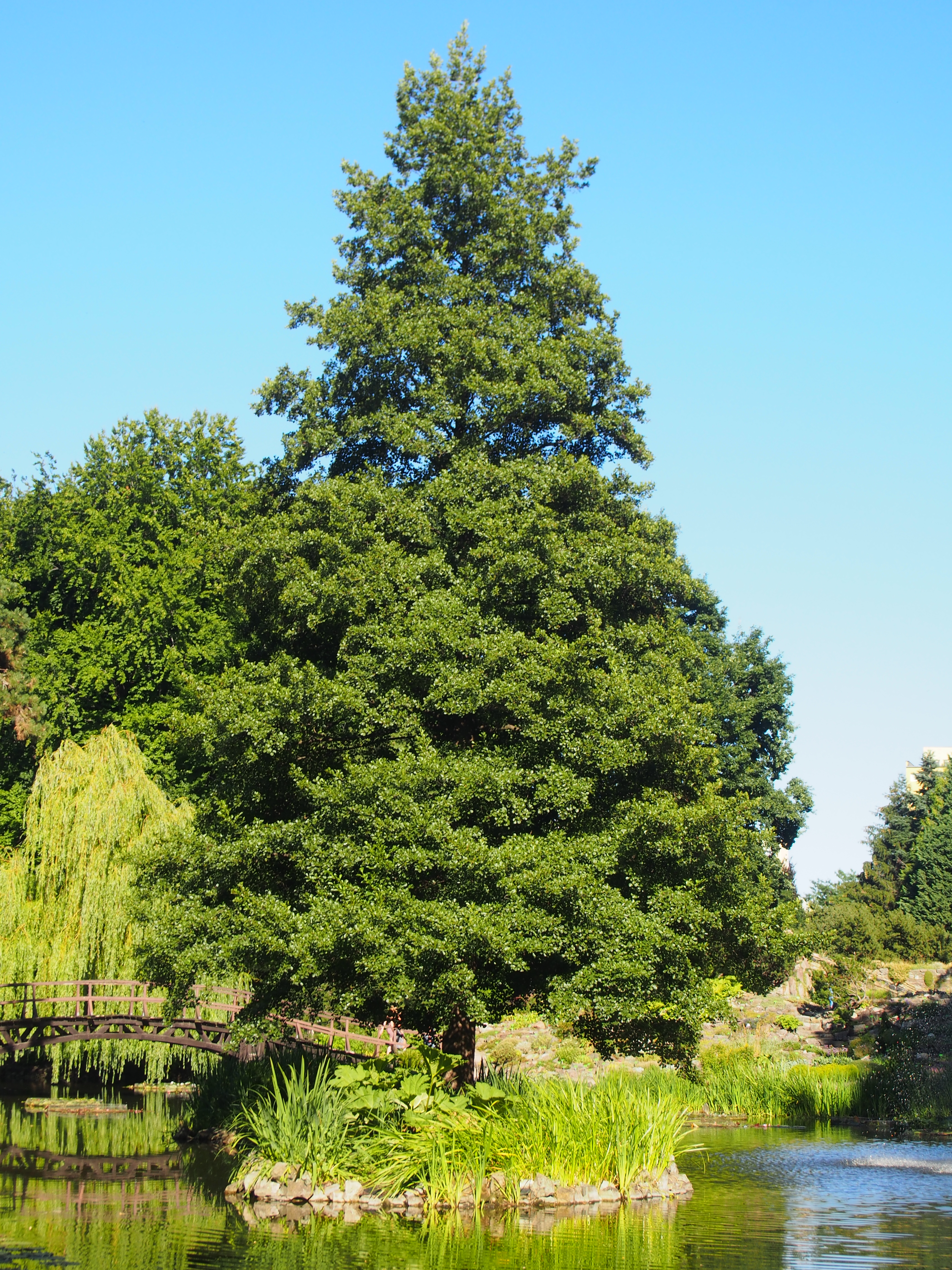
- Tree: Alder
- State highway mark
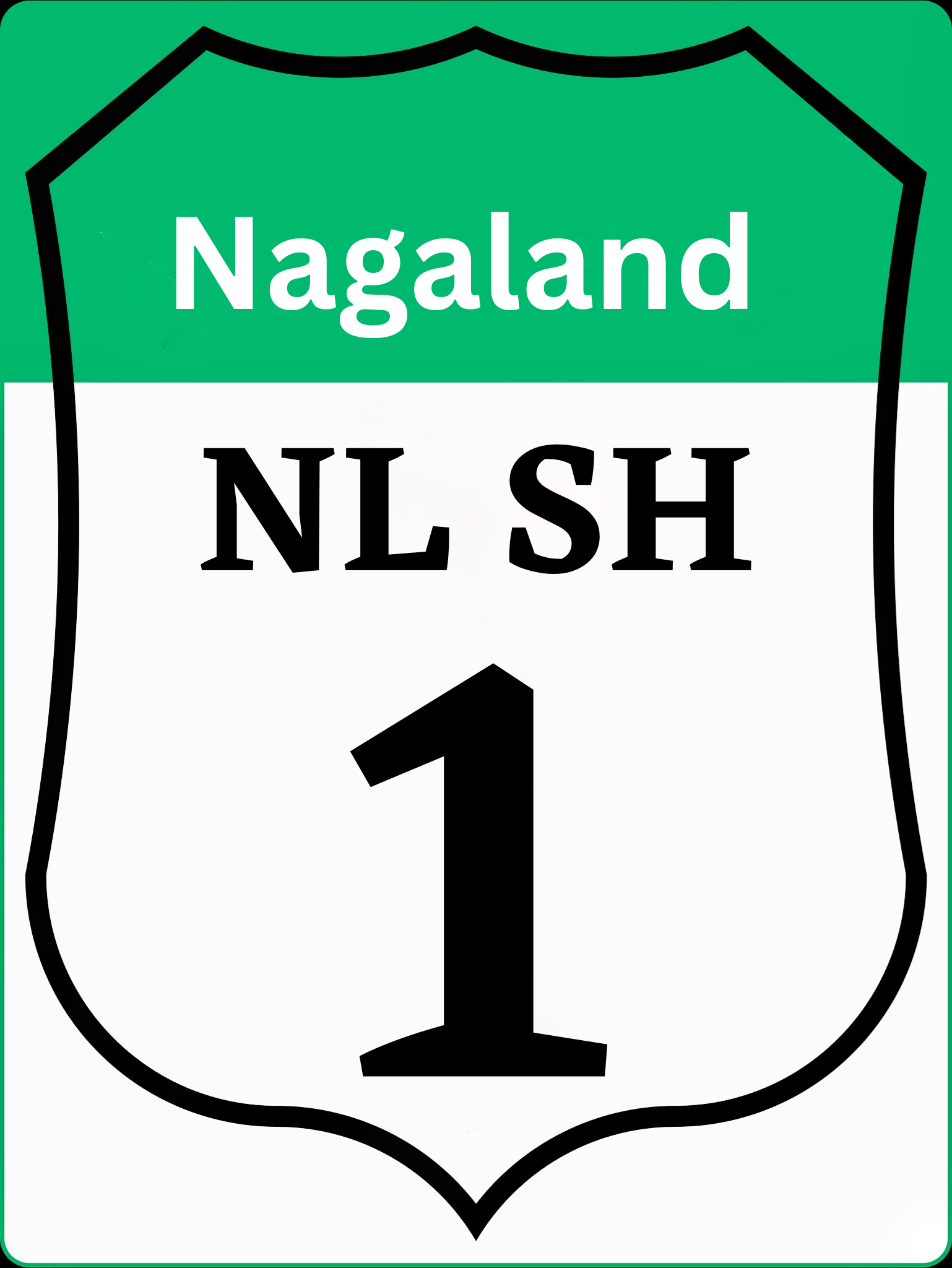
- State highway of Nagaland
- List of Indian state symbols

Nagaland (/ˈnɑːɡəlænd/) is a state in the north-eastern region of India. It is bordered by the Indian states of Arunachal Pradesh to the north, Assam to the west, Manipur to the south, and the Naga Self-Administered Zone of the Sagaing Region of Myanmar (Burma) to the east. Its capital city is Kohima and its largest city is the twin Chümoukedima–Dimapur. The state has an area of 16,579 square kilometres (6,401 sq mi) with a population of 1,980,602 as per the 2011 census of India, making it one of the least populated states in India.

Nagaland consists of 17 administrative districts, inhabited by 17 major tribes along with other sub-tribes. Each tribe is distinct in character from the other in terms of customs, language and dress. It is a land of folklore passed down the generations through word of mouth. The earliest recorded history of the Nagas of the present-day Nagaland dates back to the 13th century.

In the 19th century, the British Indian forces began expanding their influence in Northeast India, including the Naga Hills. After India's independence in 1947, the question of the Naga Hills' political status emerged. Nagaland was a district in the State of Assam until 1957, known to others as "The Naga Hills". The Naga National Council, led by Zapu Phizo, demanded an independent Naga state and launched an armed insurgency. The Indian Government, however, maintained that Nagaland was an integral part of the Indian Union. The conflict between the Naga National Council and the Indian Government resulted in a protracted insurgency. The State of Nagaland was formally inaugurated on 1 December 1963, as the 16th state of the Indian Union, and a democratically elected government took office in 1964.

Nagaland is home to a rich variety of natural, cultural, and environmental resources. It is a mountainous state and lies between the parallels of 95° and 94° eastern longitude and 25.2° and 27.0° latitude north. The high-profile Dzukou Valley is at Viswema, in the southern region of the state. The state has significant resources of natural minerals, petroleum, and hydropower, with the primary sector which is mostly agriculture still accounting for 24.6% of its economy. Other significant activities include forestry, tourism, insurance, real estate, horticulture, and miscellaneous cottage industries.

== Etymology ==
The origin of the word 'Naga' is unclear. The present day Naga people have historically been referred to by many names, like "Noga" or "Naka" by the inhabitants of the Ahom kingdom in what is now considered as Assam which means "naked", "Hao" by Meitei people of Imphal Valley and "Nakas" or 'Naga' by Burmese of what is now considered as Myanmar meaning "people with earrings", while others suggest it means pierced noses. Eventually, Nakanchi or Naganchi came to be an endonym for the region. In recent years, some cultural activists have called for the state to be renamed Naganchi.

Before the arrival of European colonialism in South Asia, there had been many wars, persecution and raids from Burma on the Nagas, Meiteis and others in India's northeast. The invaders came for "head hunting" and to seek wealth and captives from these tribes and ethnic groups. When the British inquired with Burmese guides about the people living in the northern Himalayas, they were told 'Naka'. This was recorded as 'Naga' and has been in use thereafter.

== History ==
The ancient history of the Nagas is unclear. Ethnic groups migrated at different times, each settling in the northeastern part of present India and establishing their respective sovereign mountain terrains and village states. There are no records of whether they came from the northern Mongolian region, southeast Asia, or southwest China, except that their origins are from the east of India, and historical records show the present-day Naga people settled before the arrival of the Ahoms in 1228 CE.

=== Kingdom of Ava ===
In Yan-aung-myin Pagoda inscription found in Pinya of Myanmar mentions that the Kingdom of Ava under Minkhaung I (1400–1421) in the early 1400s extended till the territories of the Nagas.

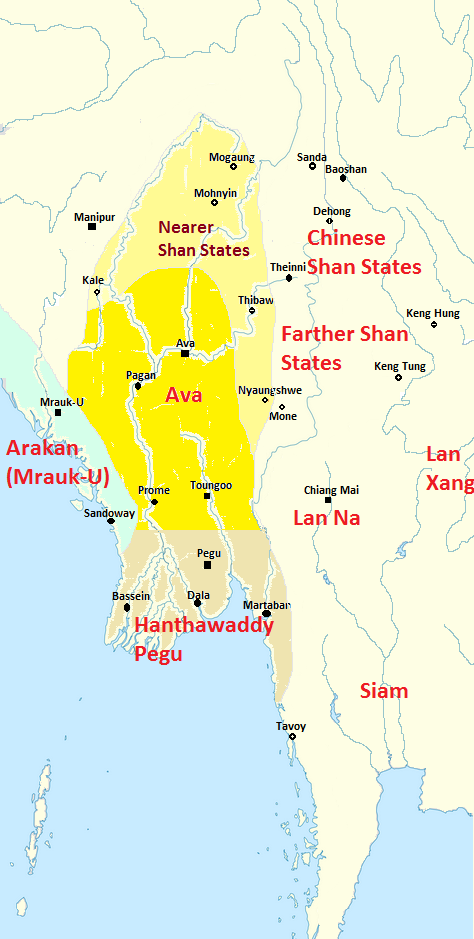
Ava kingdom in 1450

=== British administration ===
With the arrival of the British East India Company in the early 19th century, followed by the British Raj, Britain expanded its domain over the whole of South Asia, including the Naga Hills. The first Europeans to enter the hills were Captain Francis Jenkins and Lieutenant Robert Pemberton in 1832. The early contact with the Naga ethnic groups was characterised by suspicion and conflict. The colonial interests in Assam, such as managers of tea estates and other trading posts led defensive action against raids from the ethnic groups who were known for their bravery and "head hunting" practices. To put an end to these raids, the British troops recorded 10 military expeditions between 1839 and 1850. In February 1851, at the bloody Battle of Kikrüma, people died on both the British side and the Kikrüma (Naga) side; in the days after the battle, inter-ethnic warfare followed that led to more bloodshed. After that war, the British adopted a policy of caution and non-interference with Naga ethnic groups.

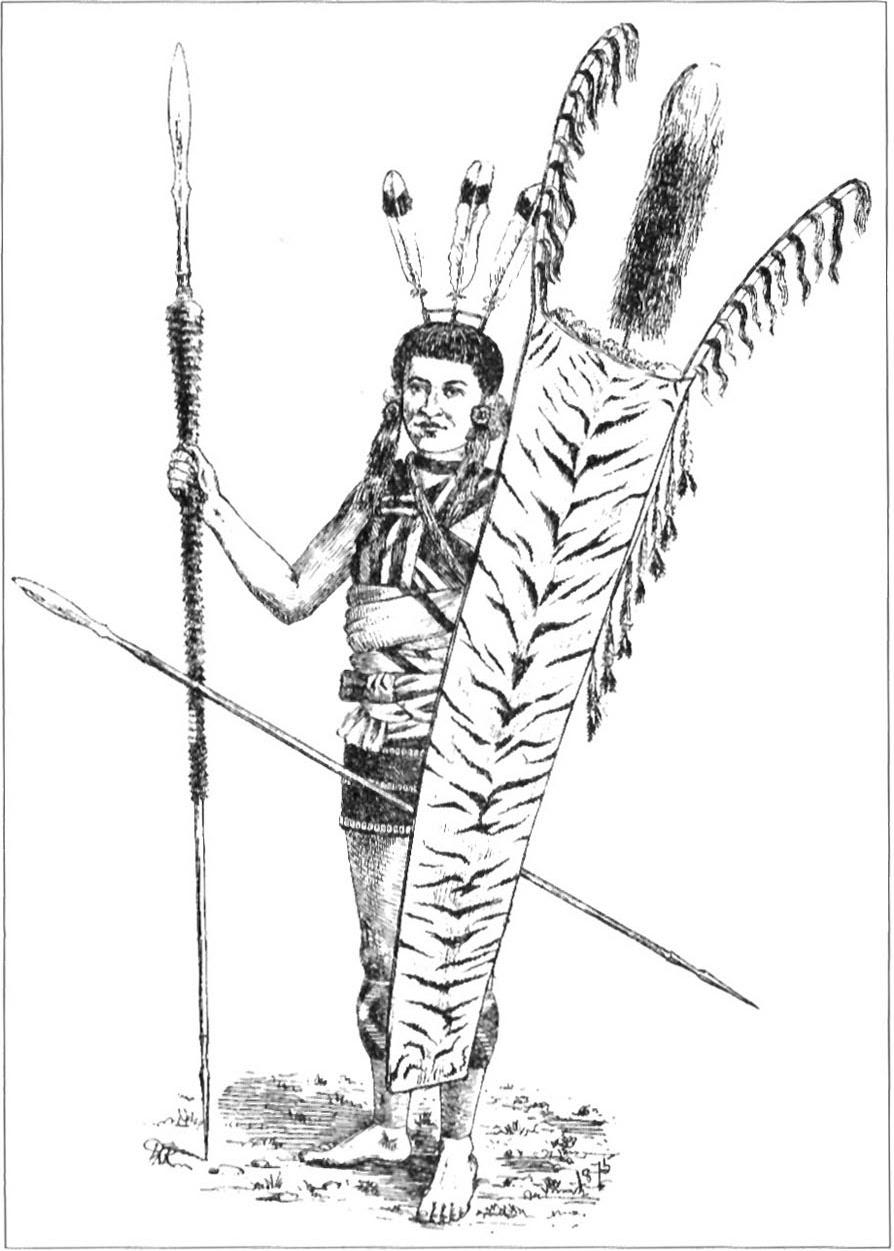
A sketch of Angami Naga tribesman from 1875

Despite this, colonists continued to move into Naga peoples' territory. Between 1851 and 1865, Naga ethnic groups continued to raid the British in Assam. The British India Government took over the holdings of the East Indian Company following the Indian Rebellion of 1857. The failings and atrocities of the East Indian Company led the British Crown to review its governance structure throughout South Asia including its northeastern region. In 1866, the British India administration established a post at Samaguting with the explicit goal of ending intertribal warfare and tribal raids on property and personnel.

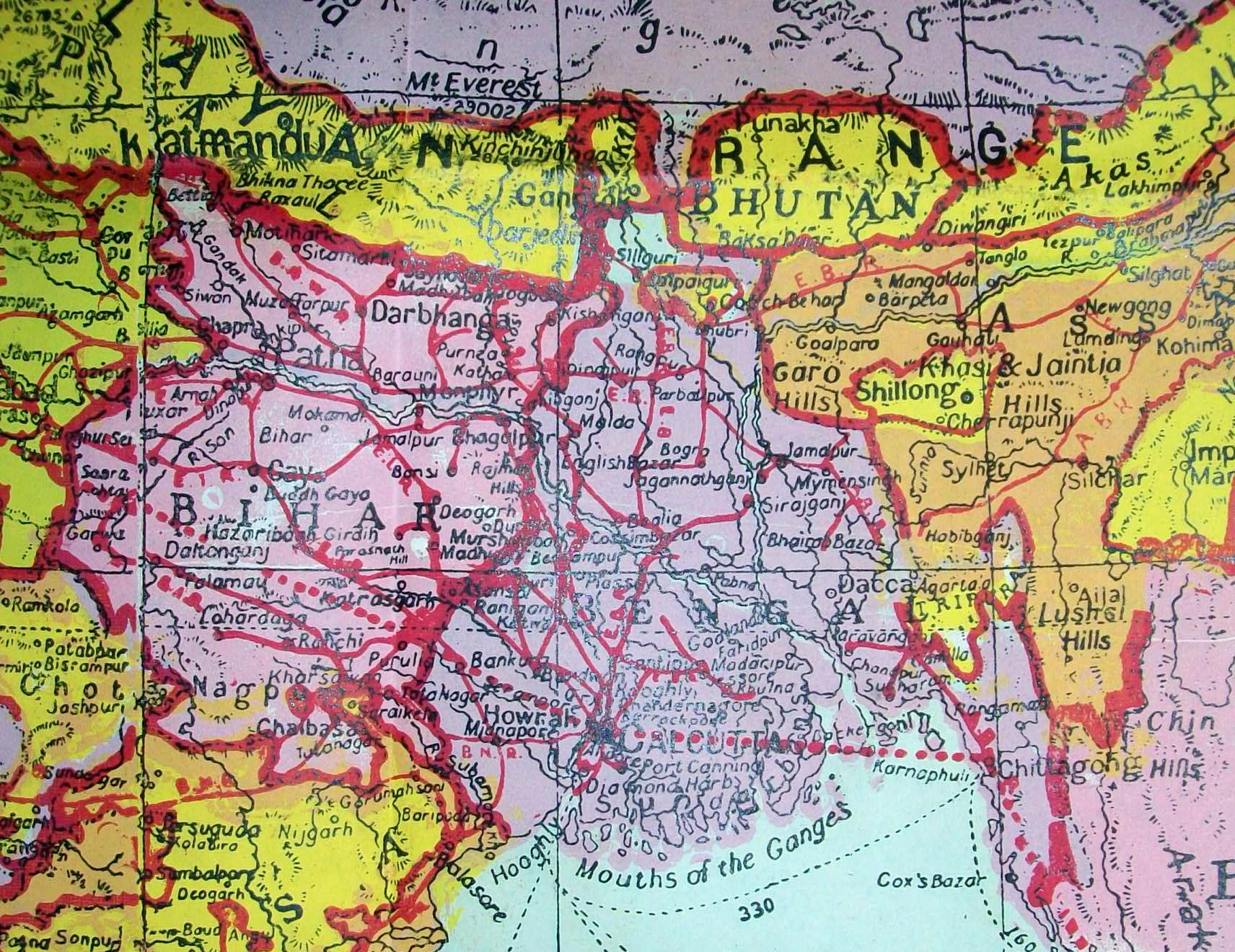
A British India 1940 map showing Nagaland and Kohima City as part of Assam

In 1869, Captain Butler was appointed to lead and consolidate the British presence in the Nagaland Hills. In 1878, the headquarters were transferred to Kohima – creating a city that remains an important centre of administration, commerce, and culture for Nagaland.

On 4 October 1879, British political agent G. H. Damant went to Khonoma with troops, where he was shot dead with 35 of his team. Kohima was subsequently attacked and the stockade looted. This violence led to a determined effort by the British Raj to return and respond. The subsequent defeat of Khonoma marked the end of serious and persistent ultimatums in the Naga Hills.

Between 1880 and 1922, the British administration consolidated their position over a large area of the Naga Hills and integrated it into its Assam operations. The British administration enforced the rupee as the currency for economic activity and a system of structured ethnic government that was very different from historic social governance practices.

In parallel, since the mid-19th century, Christian missionaries from the United States and Europe, stationed in India, reached into Nagaland and neighbouring states, converting Nagaland's Naga ethnic groups from animism to Christianity.

=== World War II ===
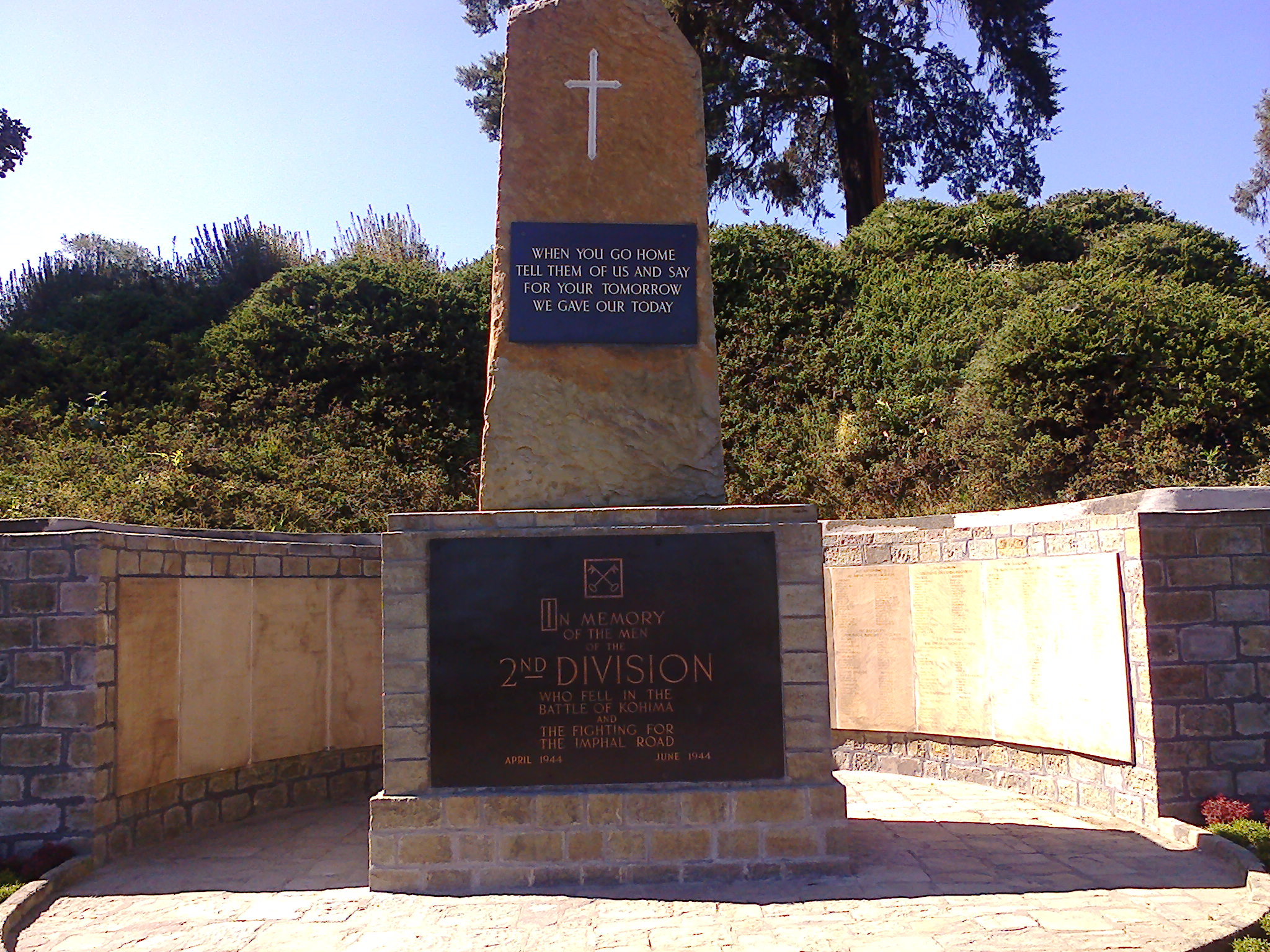
Kohima War Cemetery, Kohima, Nagaland

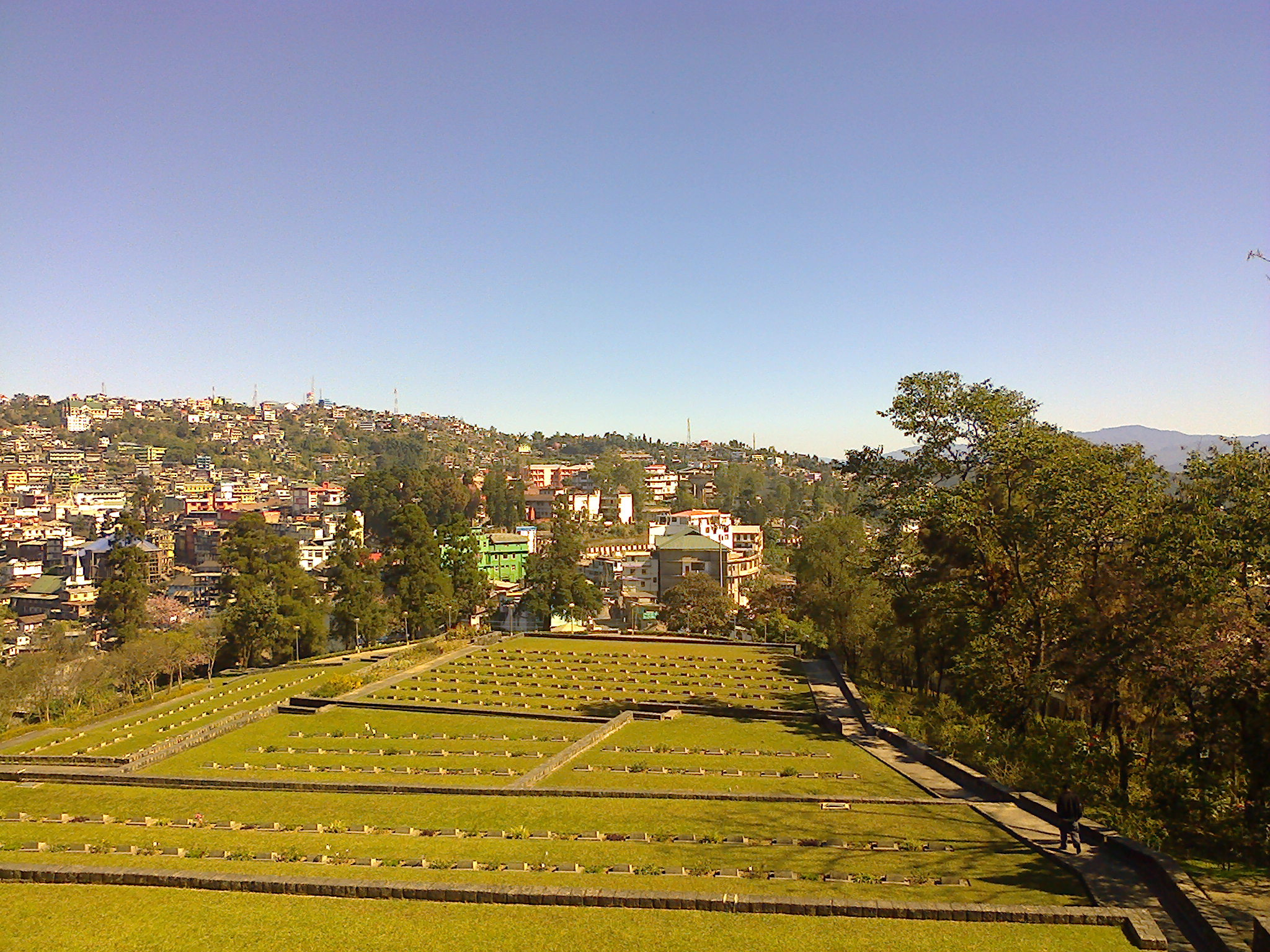
Kohima War Cemetery

In 1944, during World War II, the Japanese Army, with the help of the Indian National Army led by Netaji Subhashchandra Bose, invaded through Burma and attempted to take India through Kohima. The population was evacuated. British India soldiers defended the area of Kohima and having lost many of their original force were relieved by British in June 1944. Together the British and Indian troops successfully repelled the Japanese troops. The battle was fought from 4 April to 22 June 1944 from the town of Kohima, coordinated with action at Imphal, Manipur. The Indian National Army lost half their numbers, many through starvation, and were forced to withdraw through Burma.

There is the World War II Cemetery, and the War Museum, in honour of those who died during World War II during the fighting between the British Empire and Japanese troops. Nearly 4,000 British Empire troops died, along with 3,000 Japanese. Many of those who died were Naga people, particularly the Angami Nagas. Near the memorial is the Kohima Cathedral, on Aradura Hill, built with funds from the families and friends of deceased Japanese soldiers. Prayers are held in Kohima for peace and in memory of the fallen of both sides of the battle.

=== Naga national awakening ===
In 1929, a memorandum was submitted to the Simon Statutory Commission, requesting that the Nagas be exempt from reforms and new taxes proposed in British India, and should be left alone to determine their own future.

The Naga Memorandum submitted by the Naga Club (which later became the Naga National Council) to the Simon Commission explicitly stated, 'to leave us alone to determine ourselves as in ancient times.'

=== Post-independence history ===
After the independence of India in 1947, the area remained a part of the province of Assam. Nationalist activities arose among a section of the Nagas. Phizo-led Naga National Council demanded a political union of their ancestral and native groups. The movement led to a series of violent incidents, that damaged government and civil infrastructure, attacked government officials and civilians. The central government sent the Indian Army in 1955, to restore order. In 1957, an agreement was reached between Naga leaders and the Indian government, creating a single separate region of the Naga Hills. The Tuensang frontier was united with this single political region, Naga Hills Tuensang Area (NHTA), and it became an autonomous area under Sixth Schedule to the Constitution of India. It was to be "administered by the Governor as the agent of the President but will be distinct from the North East Frontier Administration".

This was not satisfactory to the Nagas, however, and agitation with violence increased across the state – including attacks on army and government institutions, banks, as well as non-payment of taxes. In July 1960, following discussion between Prime Minister Nehru and the leaders of the Naga People Convention (NPC), a 16-point agreement was arrived at whereby the Government of India recognised the formation of Nagaland as a full-fledged state within the Union of India.

=== Nagaland statehood and late 20th century ===
Accordingly, the territory was placed under the Nagaland Transitional Provisions Regulation, 1961 which provided for an Interim body consisting of 45 members to be elected by tribes according to the customs, traditions and usage of the respective tribes. Subsequently, Nagaland attained statehood with the enactment of the state of Nagaland Act in 1962 by the Parliament. The interim body was dissolved on 30 November 1963 and the state of Nagaland was formally inaugurated on 1 December 1963 and Kohima was declared as the state capital. After elections in January 1964, the first democratically elected Nagaland Legislative Assembly was constituted on 11 February 1964.

The rebel activity continued in many Naga inhabited areas both in India and Burma. Ceasefires were announced and negotiations continued, but this did little to stop the violence. In March 1975, a direct presidential rule was imposed by the then Prime Minister Indira Gandhi on the state. In November 1975, some leaders of the largest rebel groups agreed to lay down their arms and accept the Indian constitution, a small group did not agree and continued their insurgent activity. The Nagaland Baptist Church Council played an important role by initiating peace efforts in the 1960s.

=== 21st century ===
In 2004, two powerful bombs were set off on the same day and struck the Dimapur Railway Station and the Hong Kong Market, resulting in 30 deaths and wounding over 100 others in the deadliest terrorist attack in Nagaland to date.

Over the 5-year period of 2009 to 2013, between 0 and 11 civilians died per year in Nagaland from rebellion related activity (or less than 1 death per 100,000 people), and between 3 and 55 militants died per year in inter-factional killings (or between 0 and 3 deaths per 100,000 people).

In early 2017, Nagaland went into a state of civil unrest and protests in response to the announcement to implement 33% women's reservation in the Civic Elections.

On 4 December 2021, a unit of the 21st Para Special Forces of the Indian Army killed six civilian labourers near Oting Village in the Mon district of Nagaland. Eight more civilians and a soldier were killed in subsequent violence. The incident was widely condemned, with many calling out to repeal and revoke the Armed Forces Special Powers Act.

The most recent Nagaland Legislative Assembly election took place on 27 February 2023 to elect the Members of the Legislative Assembly (MLA) in the 60 Assembly Constituencies in the state. A voter turnout of 87% was observed in the election. The election created history by electing two women candidates for the first time in Nagaland – Hekani Jakhalu Kense and Salhoutuonuo Kruse. Both candidates were from the ruling Nationalist Democratic Progressive Party (NDPP). Salhoutuonuo Kruse later became the first woman minister of the Nagaland Legislative Assembly.

== Geography ==
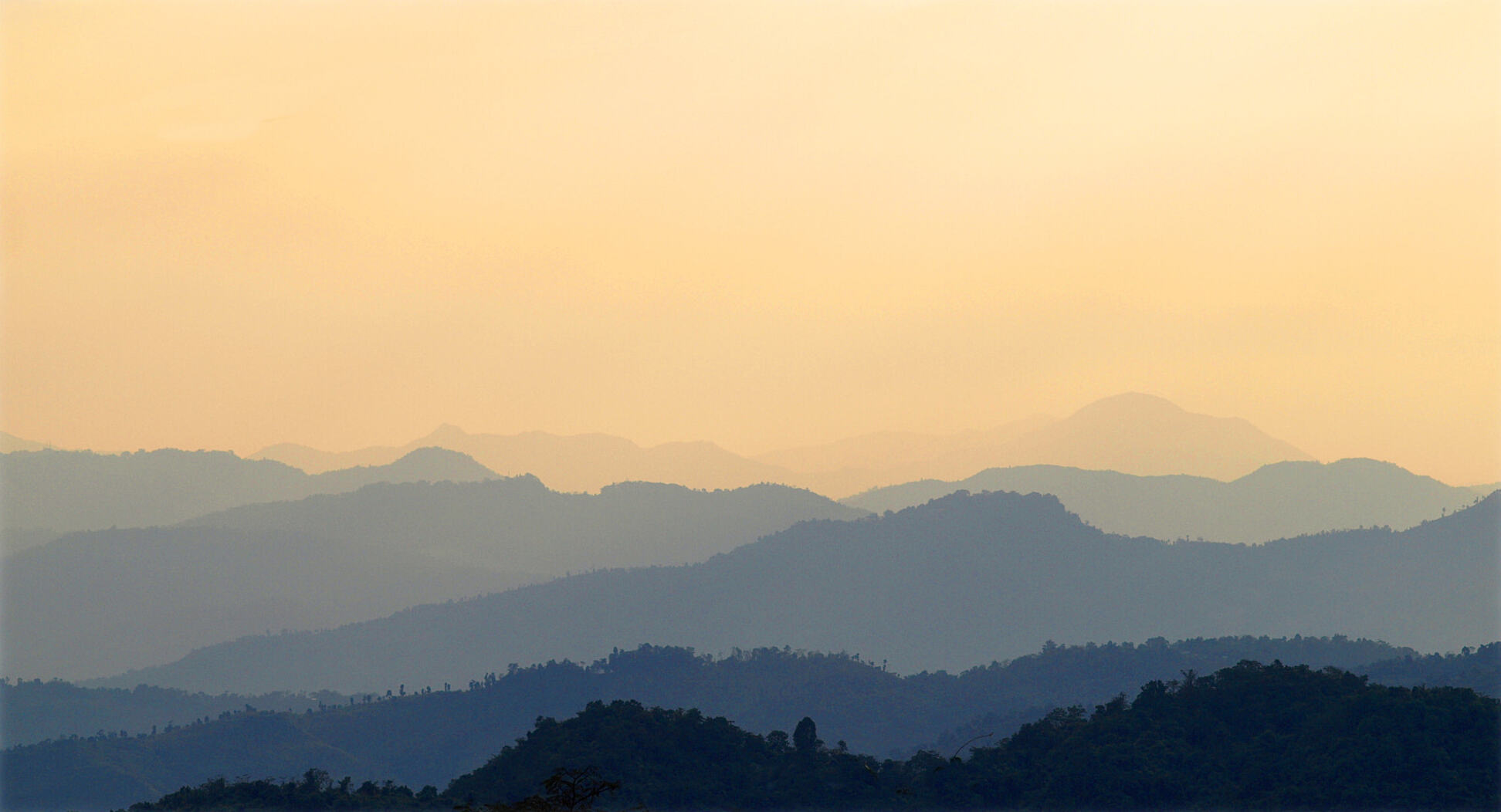
Sunset from the hills of the central part of Nagaland

Twenty per cent of the total land area of the state is covered with wooded forest, a haven for flora and fauna. The evergreen tropical and subtropical forests are found in strategic pockets in the state.

=== Climate ===
Nagaland has a largely monsoon climate with high humidity levels. Annual rainfall averages around 1,800–2,500 millimetres (70–100 in), concentrated in the months of May to September. Temperatures range from 21 to 40 °C (70 to 104 °F). In winter, temperatures do not generally drop below 4 °C (39 °F), but frost is common at high elevations. Summer is the shortest season in the state, lasting only a few months. The temperature during the summer season remains between 16 and 31 °C (61 and 88 °F). Winter often arrives early, with bitter cold and dry weather striking certain regions of the state. The maximum average temperature recorded in the winter season is 24 °C (75 °F). Strong northwest winds blow across the state during the months of February and March.

=== Flora and fauna ===
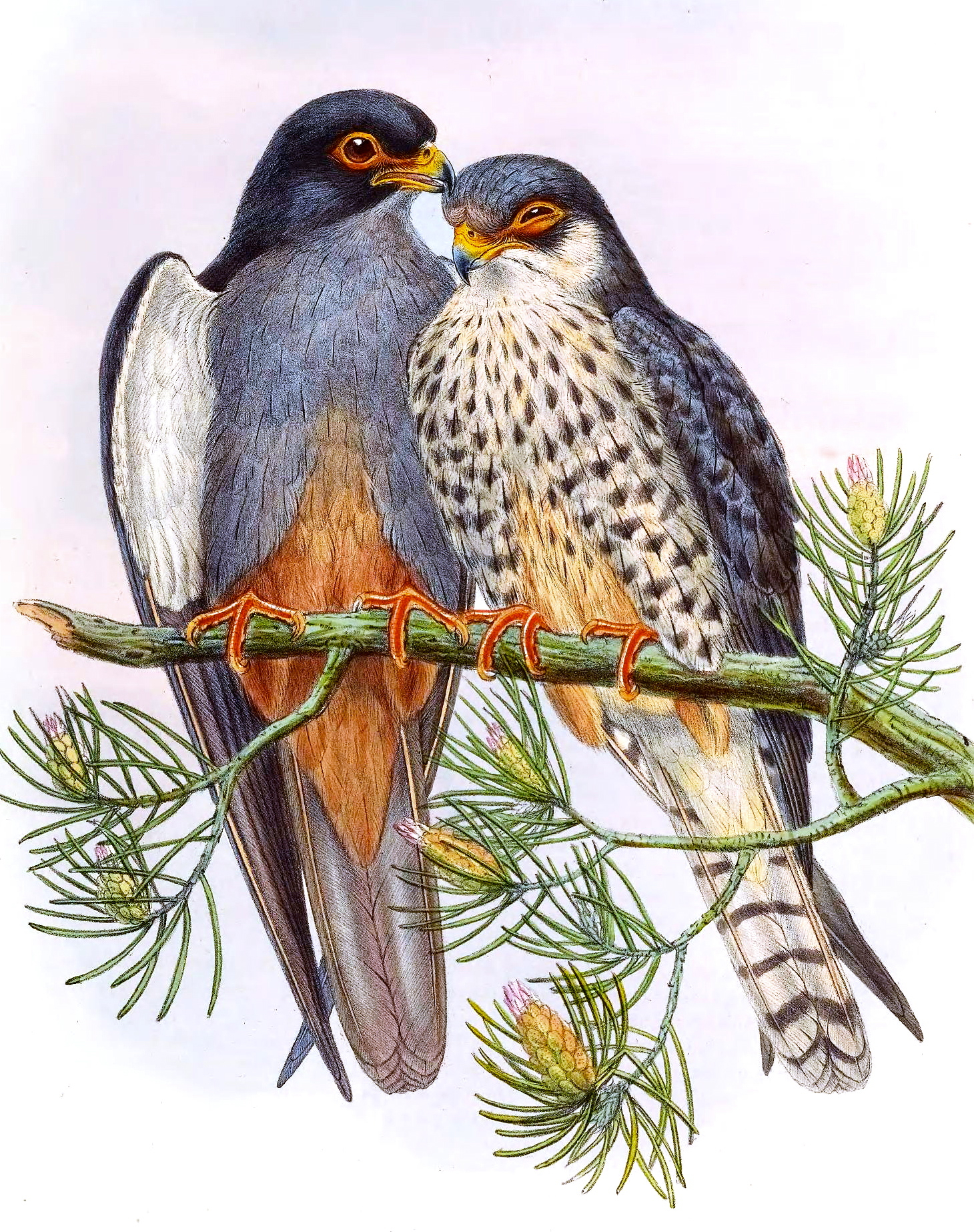
About a million Amur falcons roost in Nagaland. That is about 50 falcons per square kilometre.

About one-sixth of Nagaland is covered by tropical and sub-tropical evergreen forests—including palms, bamboo, rattan as well as timber and mahogany forests. While some forest areas have been cleared for jhum cultivation, many scrub forests, rainforests, tall grassland, and reed-grass marshes remain. Ntangki National Park, Pulie Badze Wildlife Sanctuary, Fakim Wildlife Sanctuary and Rangapahar Wildlife Sanctuary are some natural reserves in Nagaland.

Some noteworthy mammals found in Nagaland include the slow loris, Assamese macaque, pig-tailed macaque, stump-tailed macaque, rhesus macaque, capped langur, hoolock gibbon, Himalayan black bear, few sun bear, dhole, occasional Bengal tiger, Indian leopard, clouded leopard, marbled cat, golden cat, Indian elephants, Indian rhinoceros, gaur, red serow, common and leaf muntjac, eastern hog deer, sambar, Chinese pangolin, Malayan porcupine, Asiatic brush-tailed porcupine, and Hoary bamboo rats.

Nagaland has a rich birdlife with more than 490 species. The great Indian hornbill has a place in Naga culture. Blyth's tragopan, a vulnerable species of galliform, is the state bird of Nagaland. It is sighted in Mount Japfü and Dzüko Valley of Kohima District, Satoi range in Zünheboto district and Pfütsero in Phek district. The state is also known as the "falcon capital of the world" thanks to the hundreds of thousands of Amur falcons that stop at Doyang Reservoir to feast on flying termites on their way from China and Siberia to Africa each year.

Mithun (a semi-domesticated gaur) is the state animal of Nagaland and has been adopted as the official seal of the Government of Nagaland. It is ritually the most valued species in the state. To conserve and protect this animal in the northeast, the National Research Centre on Mithun (NRCM) was established by the Indian Council of Agricultural Research (ICAR) in 1988.

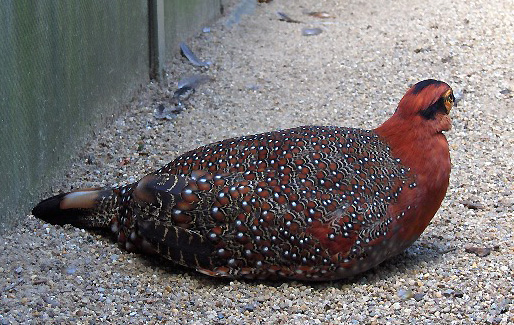
Blyth's tragopan or the grey-bellied tragopan

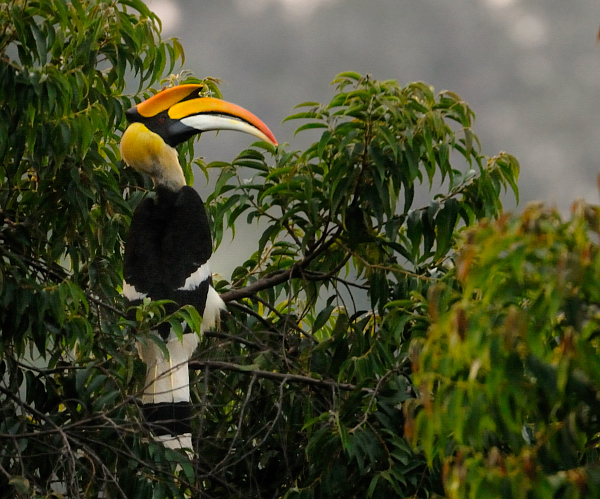
Great hornbill

Nagaland is home to 396 species of orchids, belonging to 92 genera of which 54 having horticultural and medicinal economic importance.

=== Geology ===
Several preliminary studies indicate significant recoverable reserves of petroleum and natural gas. Limestone, marble and other decorative stone reserves are plentiful, and other as yet unexploited minerals include iron, nickel, chromium, and cobalt.

=== Urbanisation ===
The Nagaland population is largely rural with 71.14% living in rural regions in 2011. Census reports up to 1951 listed just one settlement in Nagaland as a town, the capital Kohima. The next two settlements, Dimapur and Mokokchung were listed as towns from 1961. Four more towns appeared in 1981: Tuensang, Wokha, Mon and Zünheboto.

The relatively slow rate of urbanisation in Nagaland was described in the 1980s as being an effect of (a) the largely administrative roles of the towns, except for Dimapur which had a more diversified economy, and (b) a low level of mobility among the tribes of Nagaland, scheduled tribes constituting nearly 90% of the population.

== Demographics ==
=== Population ===
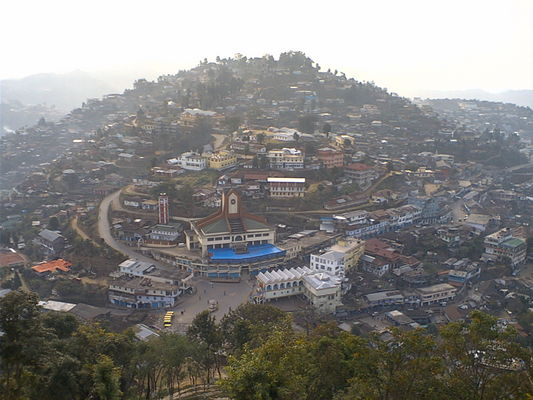
Mokokchung is one of the most populated places in the northern part of Nagaland.

Historical population
Year	Pop.	±%
1901	101,550	—
1911	149,038	+46.8%
1921	158,801	+6.6%
1931	178,844	+12.6%
1941	189,641	+6.0%
1951	212,975	+12.3%
1961	369,200	+73.4%
1971	516,449	+39.9%
1981	774,930	+50.0%
1991	1,209,546	+56.1%
2001	1,990,036	+64.5%
2011	1,978,502	−0.6%
Source: Census of India

The population of Nagaland consists of almost 2.2 million people, consisting of 1.04 million males and 0.95 million females. Among its districts, Kohima has the largest population (270,063) followed by Dimapur (170,000). The least populated district is Longleng (50,593). 75% of the population lives in the rural areas. As of 2013, about 10% of rural population is below the poverty line; among the people living in urban areas 4.3% of them are below the poverty line.

The state showed a population drop between the 2001 census and the 2011 census, the only state to show a population drop in the census. This has been attributed, by scholars, to incorrect counting in past censuses; the 2011 census in Nagaland is considered most reliable so far.

The largest urban agglomerations are centred upon Dimapur (122,834) and Kohima (115,283). Other major towns (and 2011 census populations) are Tuensang (36,774), Mokokchung (35,913), Wokha (35,004), Mon (26,328), Chümoukedima (25,885), Zünheboto (22,633), Kiphire (16,487), Kuda (16,108), Kohima Village (15,734), Phek (14,204), Pfütsero (10,371) and Diphupar 'A' (10,246).

The life expectancy of Nagaland stands at 75.4 years, 79.9 years for females and 71.5 years for males (2019–21) while the infant mortality rate amounts to 3 per 1,000 births (2019), on par with the most developed countries. Both health indicators are the best among Indian states. The fertility rate of 1.7 children per woman (2019–21) lies below the population replacement level.

=== Ethnic groups ===
The state is home to 15 major native Naga ethnic groups – Angami, Ao, Chakhesang, Chang, Khiamniungan, Konyak, Lotha, Phom, Pochury, Rengma, Sangtam, Sümi, Tikhir, Yimkhiung, Zeme-Liangmai (Zeliang) and two other ethnic groups namely Kuki and Kachari with decent number of community.

Some other recent minor tribes or subtribes that can found in the state are Garo, Karbi, Chirr, Makury, and Rongmei.

There are also sizeable populations of non-native communities like Bengalis, Marwaris, Nepalis, Punjabis and others living mostly around Dimapur City.

=== Languages ===
Languages of Nagaland in 2011
1. Konyak (12.3%)
2. Ao (11.7%)
3. Lotha (8.96%)
4. Angami (7.67%)
5. Chokri (4.60%)
6. Sangtam (3.83%)
7. Bengali (3.77%)
8. Yimkhiungrü (3.74%)
9. Chang (3.31%)
10. Khiamniungan (3.12%)
11. Rengma (3.11%)
12. Zeliang (3.05%)
13. Phom (2.71%)
14. Nepali (2.71%)
15. Kuzhami (1.73%)
16. Hindi (1.59%)
17. Pochury (1.08%)
18. Other (21.0%)

Naga people form the majority of the population. According to the 2011 census there are 2 million people living in Nagaland. The Naga people number around 1.8 million in the state, constituting over 90% of the population. These belong mostly to the Sino-Tibetan language family. Shafer came up with his own classification system for languages found in and around Nagaland.

In 1967, the Nagaland Assembly proclaimed Indian English as the official language of Nagaland and it is the medium for education in Nagaland. Other than English, Nagamese, a creole language based on Assamese, is widely spoken.

The major languages spoken as per the 2011 census are Konyak (244,135), Ao (231,084), Lotha (177,488), Angami (151,883), Chokri (91,010), Sangtam (75,841), Bengali (74,753), Zeme (71,954; covering Zeliang, 60,399 and Zemi, 11,165), Yimkhiungrü (74,156), Chang (65,632), Khiamniungan (61,906), Rengma (61,537), Phom (53,674), Nepali (43,481), Kuzhami (34,218), Pochury (21,446), Kuki (18,391), Chakhesang (17,919), Assamese (17,201), Bodo (12,243; covering Bodo 7,372 and Dimasa 4,871), Manipuri (9,511), Sema (8,268), etc.

=== Religion ===
Decadal Growth of Religions in Nagaland (1901–2011).

Religion in Nagaland (2011)
1. Christianity (87.9%)
2. Hinduism (8.75%)
3. Islam (2.47%)
4. Buddhism (0.34%)
5. Jainism (0.13%)
6. Sikhism (0.10%)
7. Other religion (0.16%)
8. not religious (0.12%)

According to the 2011 Census, 87.93% of the state population are Christian, making it the most Christian populated state in India. Hindus form the second largest at 8.75%, followed by Muslims (2.47%), Buddhists (0.34%), Jains (0.13%), and Sikhs (0.10%), with 0.12% reporting no religious affiliation.

==== Christianity ====
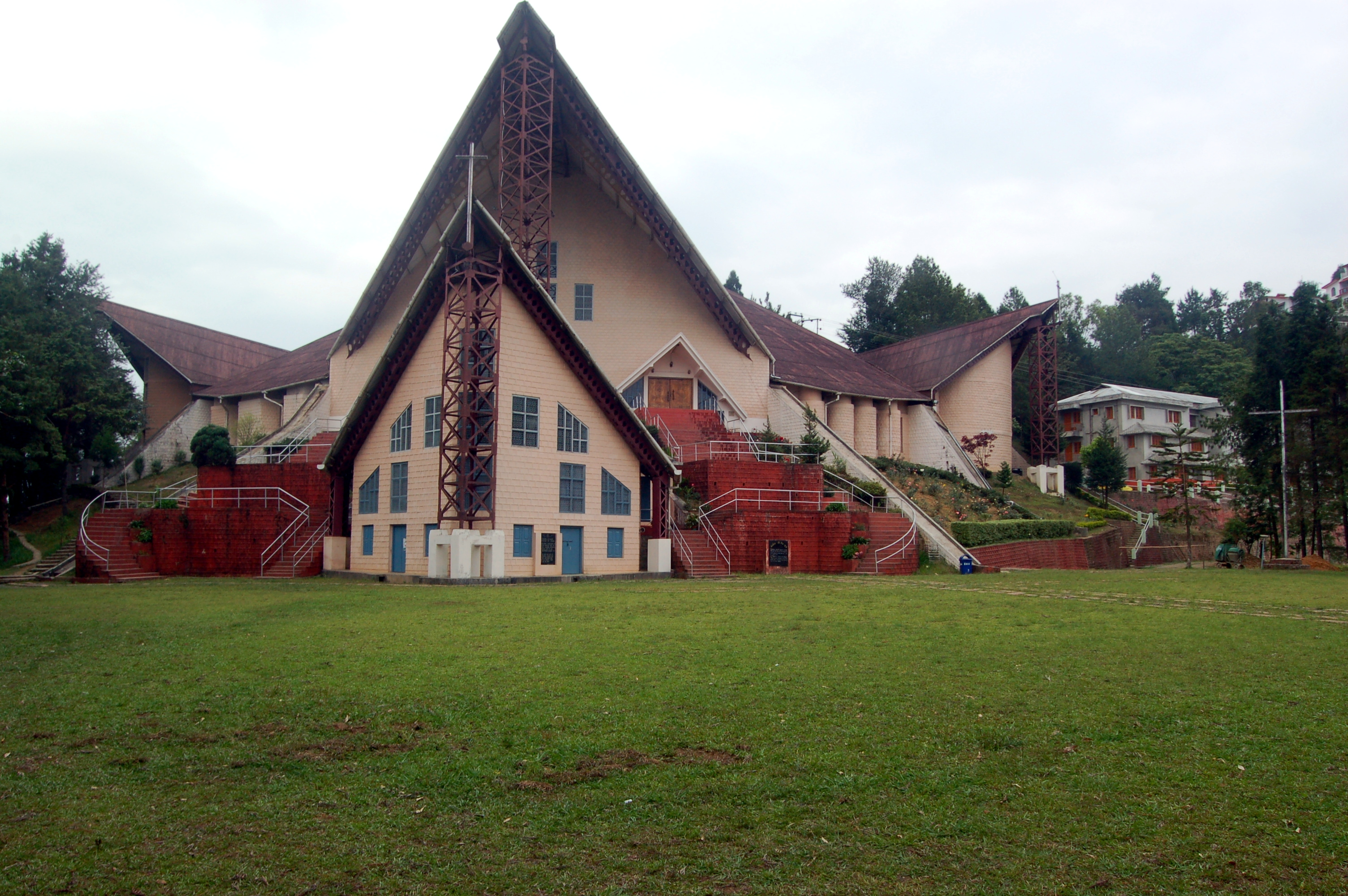
The Catholic Cathedral in Kohima City. About 80% of Nagaland's citizens are Baptists.

The state's population is 1.978 million, out of which 88% are Christians. Nagaland is known as "the only predominantly Baptist State in the World" and "the most Baptist State in the World."

Christianity arrived in Nagaland in the early 19th century. The American Baptist Naga mission grew out of the Assam mission in 1836. Miles Bronson, Nathan Brown and other Christian Missionaries working out of Jaipur to bring Christianity to the Indian subcontinent, saw the opportunity for gaining converts since many parts of India's northeast was principally animist and folk religion-driven. Along with other tribal regions of the northeast, the people of Nagaland converted to Christianity.

==== Hinduism ====
Hinduism form around 8% of Nagaland. Hindus are concentrated mainly in the erstwhile Dimapur District (as per the 2011 census of India, comprising the present districts of Dimapur, Niuland, and Chümoukedima) (28.75%) and Kohima District (9.51%). Dimapur Kalibari is a famous temple in Nagaland. A small number of Nagas (5,176) follow Hinduism according to the 2011 census.

==== Islam ====
Islam is the third practised religion with approximately 2.5 per cent of the Nagaland population. The highest concentration of Muslims in Dimapur district, while other districts have less than 2%.

Historical accounts indicate that Islamic influence reached parts of the Naga Hills during the seventeenth century through the activities of the Assamese Sufi figure Azan Fakir. According to one account, he delegated an associate named Saleh Saheb to remain in the hills and continue religious work among local communities. The descendants of Saleh Saheb later became known as the Parbatia Dewan ("Chief of the Hill"). Despite these efforts, Islam did not lead to the formation of a distinct indigenous tribal Naga-Muslim community in Nagaland.

=== Other religions ===
There are also folk religions practised by some Nagas, specially among the Zeliangrongs (Zemes, Liangmais and Rongmeis) but few among other Naga ethnic groups.

== Government ==
The governor is the constitutional head of state, representative of the President of India. He possesses largely ceremonial responsibilities apart from law and order responsibilities.

=== Elections ===
The Democratic Alliance of Nagaland (DAN) is a state level coalition of political parties. It headed the government with the Bharatiya Janata Party (BJP) and Janata Dal (United) (JDU). It was formed in 2003 after the Nagaland Legislative Assembly election, with the Naga People's Front (NPF), and the BJP. The alliance was in power in Nagaland from 2003 to 2018.

The NDPP–BJP–NPF alliance led UDA government has won the majority in 2018 and 2023 Nagaland Legislative Assembly election.

== Administrative districts ==
The seventeen districts of Nagaland

=== Districts ===
The seventeen districts of Nagaland, and their headquarters, 2011 census populations, areas and elevations (of the seat) are:

District	Seat	Area (km^{2})	Elevation (m)	Population total	Population rural	Population urban	Date created
Chümoukedima district	Chümoukedima	610	171	125,400	81,884	43,516	2021
Dimapur district	Dimapur	70	145	170,000	0	170,000	1997
Kiphire district	Kiphire	1,130	896	74,004	57,517	16,487	2004
Kohima district	Kohima	1,207	1,444	267,988	146,900	121,088	1957
Longleng district	Longleng	885	1,100	50,484	42,871	7,613	2004
Meluri district	Meluri	1,011	n/a	22,558	n/a	n/a	2024
Mokokchung district	Mokokchung	1,719	1,325	194,622	138,897	55,725	1957
Mon district	Mon	1,786	655	250,260	215,816	34,444	1973
Niuland district	Niuland	n/a	154	11,876	11,876	0	2021
Noklak district	Noklak	1,152		59,300	59,300	0	2017
Peren district	Peren	2,300	1,445	95,219	81,429	13,790	2004
Phek district	Phek	2,026	1,524	163,418	138,843	24,575	1973
Shamator district	Shamator	n/a	n/a	12,726	n/a	n/a	2022
Tseminyü district	Tseminyü	256	1,261	63,629	60,766	2863	2021
Tuensang district	Tuensang	2,536	1,371	137,296	100,522	36,774	1957
Wokha district	Wokha	1,628	1,313	166,343	131,339	35,004	1973
Zünheboto district	Zunheboto	1,255	1,852	140,757	113,160	27,597	1973

== Economy ==
The Gross State Domestic Product (GSDP) of Nagaland was about ₹12,065 crore (US$1.3 billion) in 2011–12. Nagaland's GSDP grew at 9.9% compounded annually for a decade, thus more than doubling the per capita income.

Nagaland has a literacy rate of 80.1 per cent. The majority of the population in the state speaks English, which is the official language of the state. The state offers technical and medical education. Nevertheless, agriculture and forestry contribute a majority of Nagaland's Gross Domestic Product. The state is rich in mineral resources such as coal, limestone, iron, nickel, cobalt, chromium, and marble.

Terrace farming at Pfütsero

Plantation crops such as premium coffee, cardamom, and tea are grown in hilly areas in small quantities with large growth potential. Most people cultivate rice as it is the main staple diet of the people. About 80% of the cropped area is dedicated to rice. Oilseeds is another, higher income crop gaining ground in Nagaland.

The farm productivity for all crops is low, compared to other Indian states, suggesting a significant opportunity for farmer income increase. Currently, the Jhum to Terraced cultivation ratio is 4:3; where Jhum is the local name for cut-and-burn shift farming. Jhum farming is ancient, causes a lot of pollution and soil damage, yet accounts for the majority of the farmed area. The state does not produce enough food and depends on the trade of food from other states of India.

Tourism has a lot of potentials but was largely limited due to insurgency and concern of terrorist violence over the last five decades. More recently, a number of Small Medium Enterprises and private sector companies have actively promoted Nagaland tourism, helping initiate a growing tourism market. Tourism experts contend that the state's uniqueness and strategic location in northeast India give Nagaland an advantage in tapping into the tourism sector for economic growth.

The state generates 87.98 MU compared to a demand for 242.88 MU. This deficit requires Nagaland to buy power. The state has significant hydroelectric potential, which if realised could make the state a power surplus state. In terms of power distribution, every village and town, and almost every household has an electricity connection; but, this infrastructure is not effective given the power shortage in the state.

=== Natural resources ===
After a gap of almost 20 years, Nagaland state Chief Minister, T. R. Zeliang launched the resumption of oil exploration in Changpang and Tsori areas, under Wokha District in July 2014. The exploration will be carried out by the Metropolitan Oil & Gas Pvt. Ltd. Zeliang has alleged failures and disputed payments made to the statement made by the previous explorer, the state-owned Oil and Natural Gas Corporation (ONGC).

== Transportation ==
Nagaland's rugged and mountainous landscape presents a major challenge to the infrastructural development of transport. Roads are the backbone of Nagaland's transportation network. The state has over 15,000 km of surfaced roads, but these are not satisfactorily maintained given the weather damage. Yet, in terms of population served for each kilometre of surfaced road, Nagaland is the second best state in the region after Arunachal Pradesh.

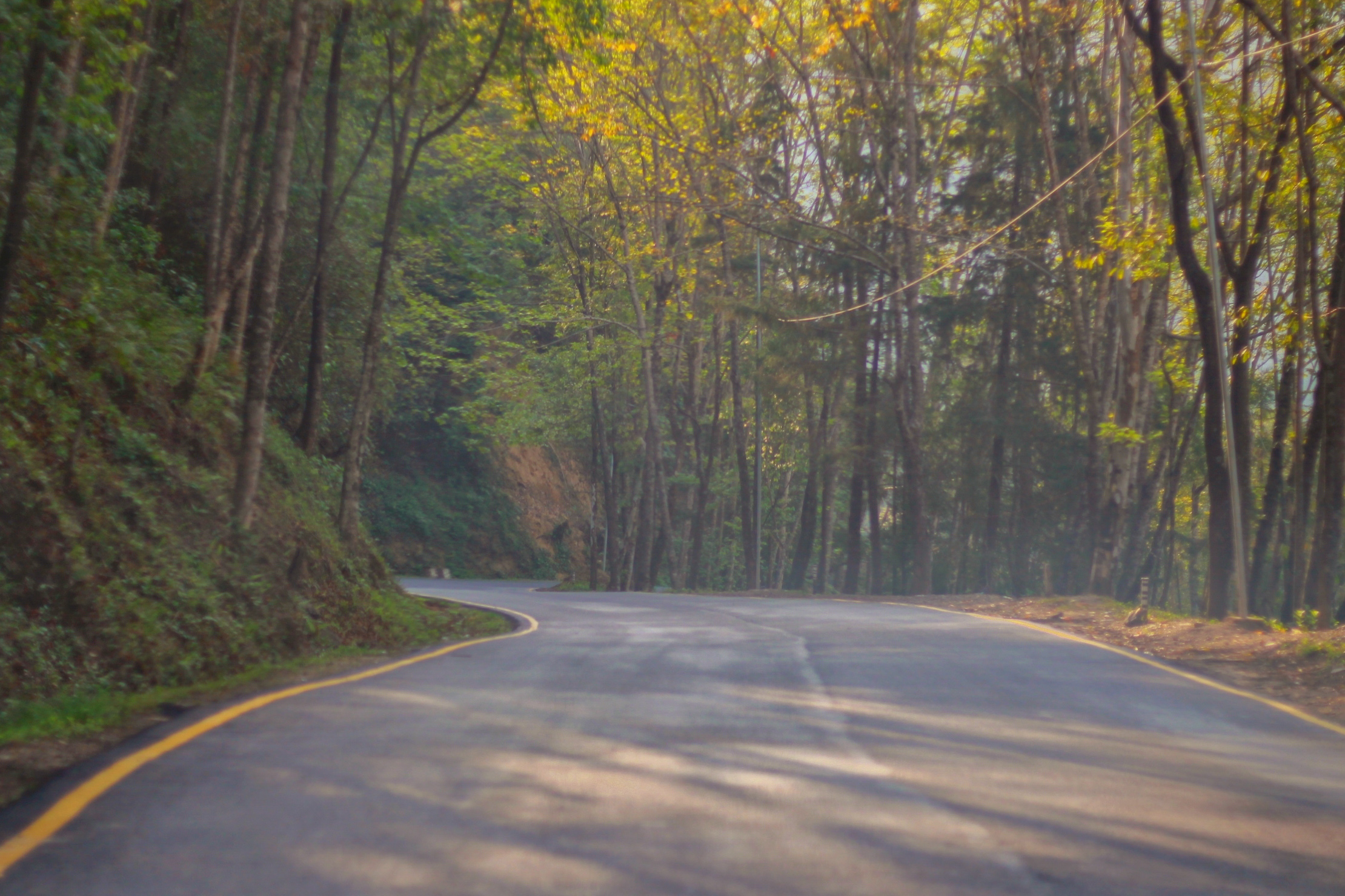
AH1 passing through Nagaland

=== Roadways ===
==== International highways passing through Nagaland ====
- Asian Highway 1
- Asian Highway 2

==== National highways in Nagaland ====
- NH 2 : Dibrugarh–Tuli–Changtongya–Mokokchung–Wokha–Tseminyü–Kohima–Viswema–Imphal
- NH 29 : Dabaka–Dimapur–Chümoukedima–Kohima–Kigwema–Chizami–Jessami
- NH 129 : Dimapur–Numaligarh
- NH 129A : Dimapur–Rüzaphema–Pimla–Jalukie–Peren–Maram
- NH 202 : Mokokchung–Tuensang–Meluri–Jessami–Imphal
- NH 702 : Changtongya–Longleng–Mon–Tizit–Sapekhati
- NH 702B : Longleng–Tuensang

=== Airways ===
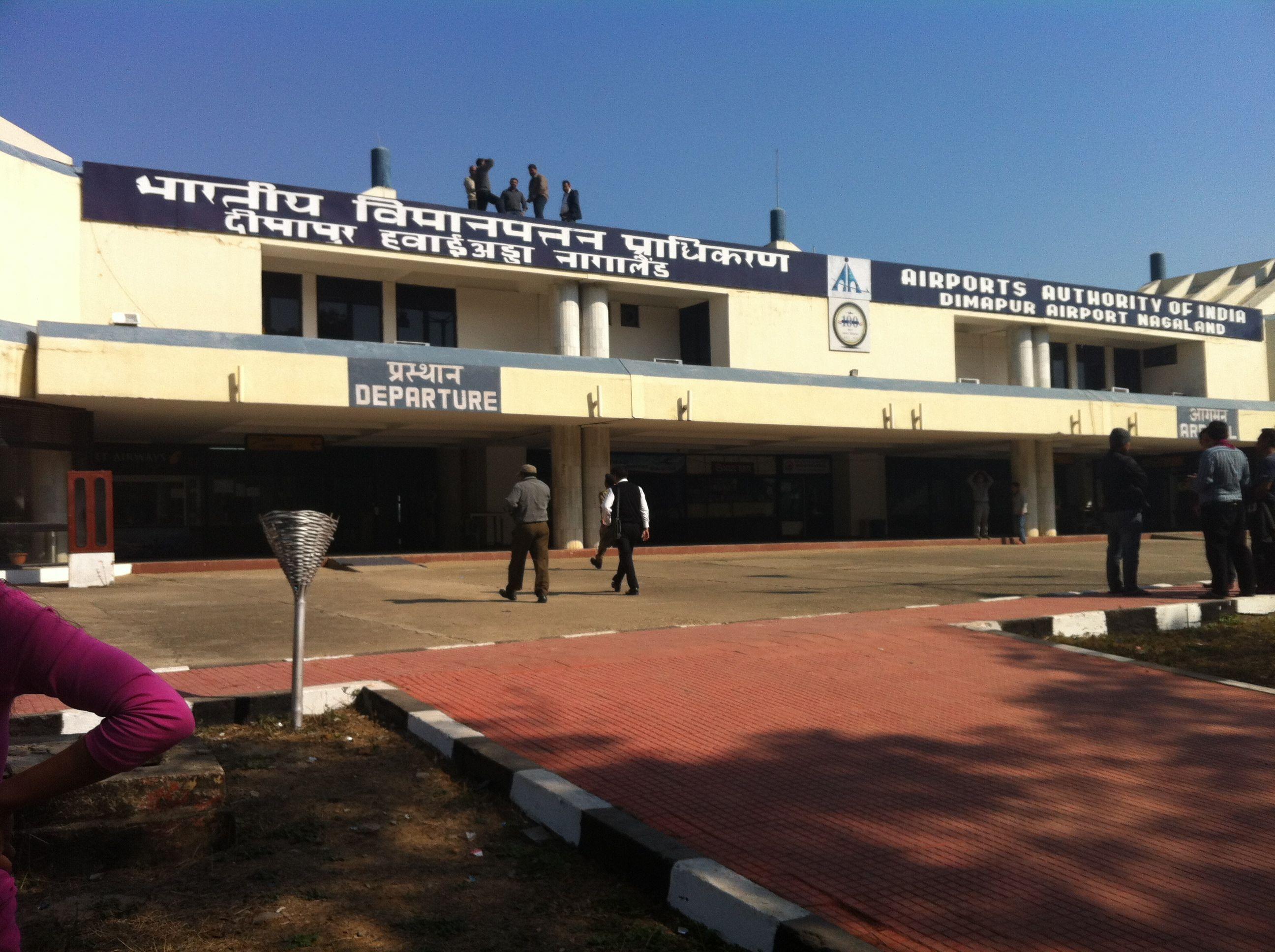
Dimapur Airport departures

Dimapur Airport is the sole airport in Nagaland, with scheduled commercial services to Kolkata, Guwahati, Imphal, and Dibrugarh. It is located 7 kilometres (4.3 mi) from Dimapur, and 70 kilometres (43 mi) from Kohima. The airport's asphalt runway is 2290 metre long, at an elevation of 487 feet.

== Culture ==
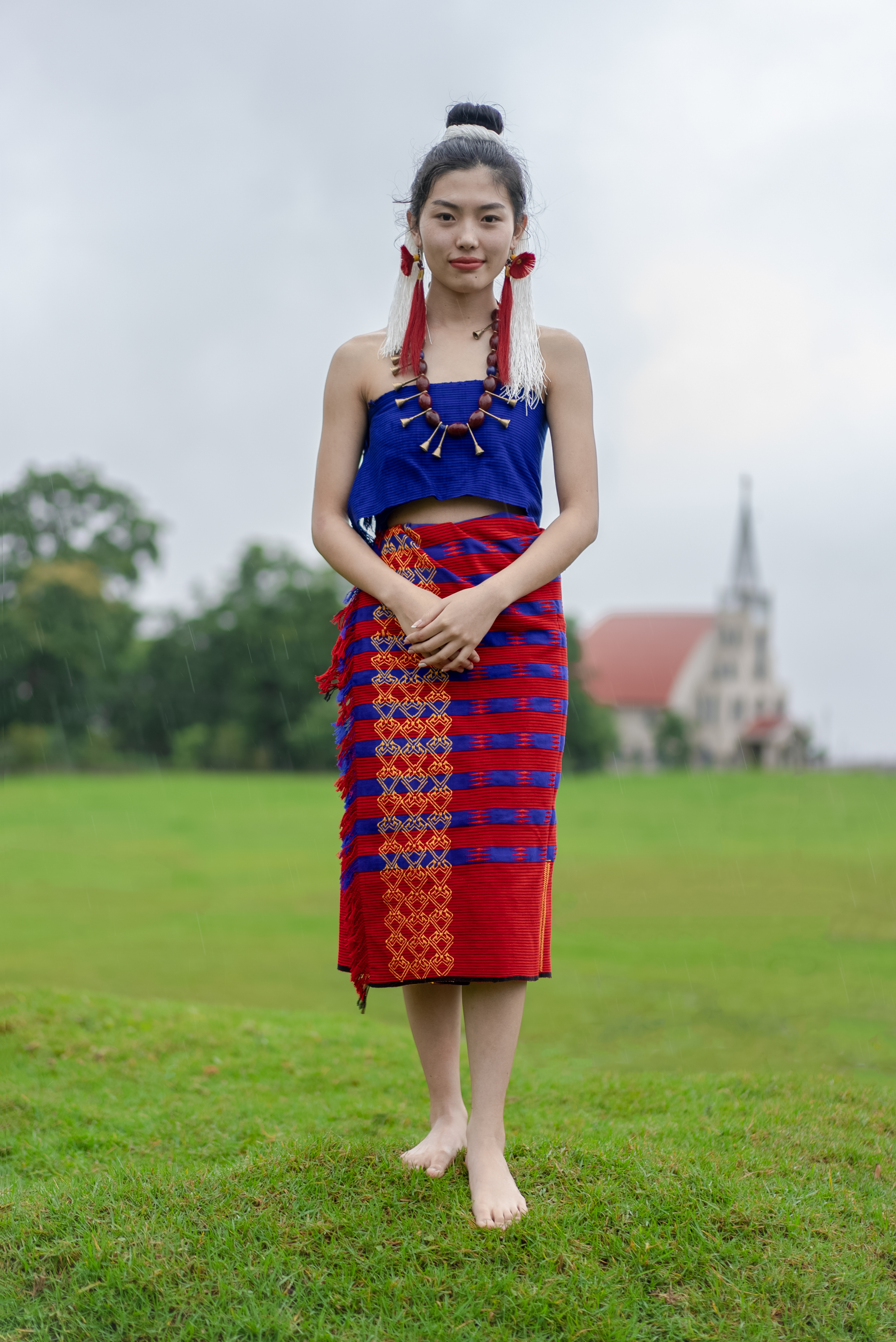
Ao Naga woman wearing teperemsü, a traditional Ao Naga skirt

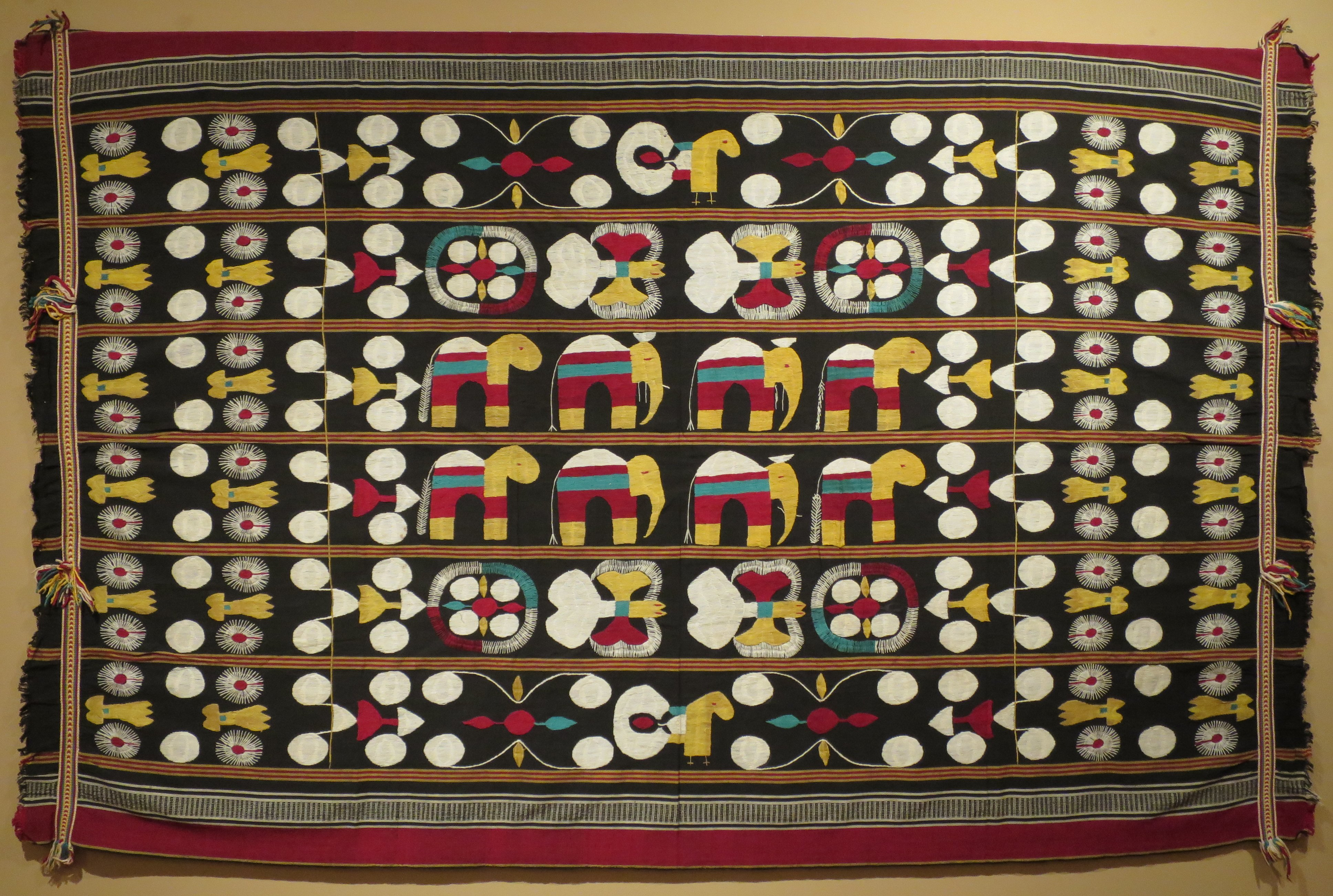
Embroidered textile of Nagaland

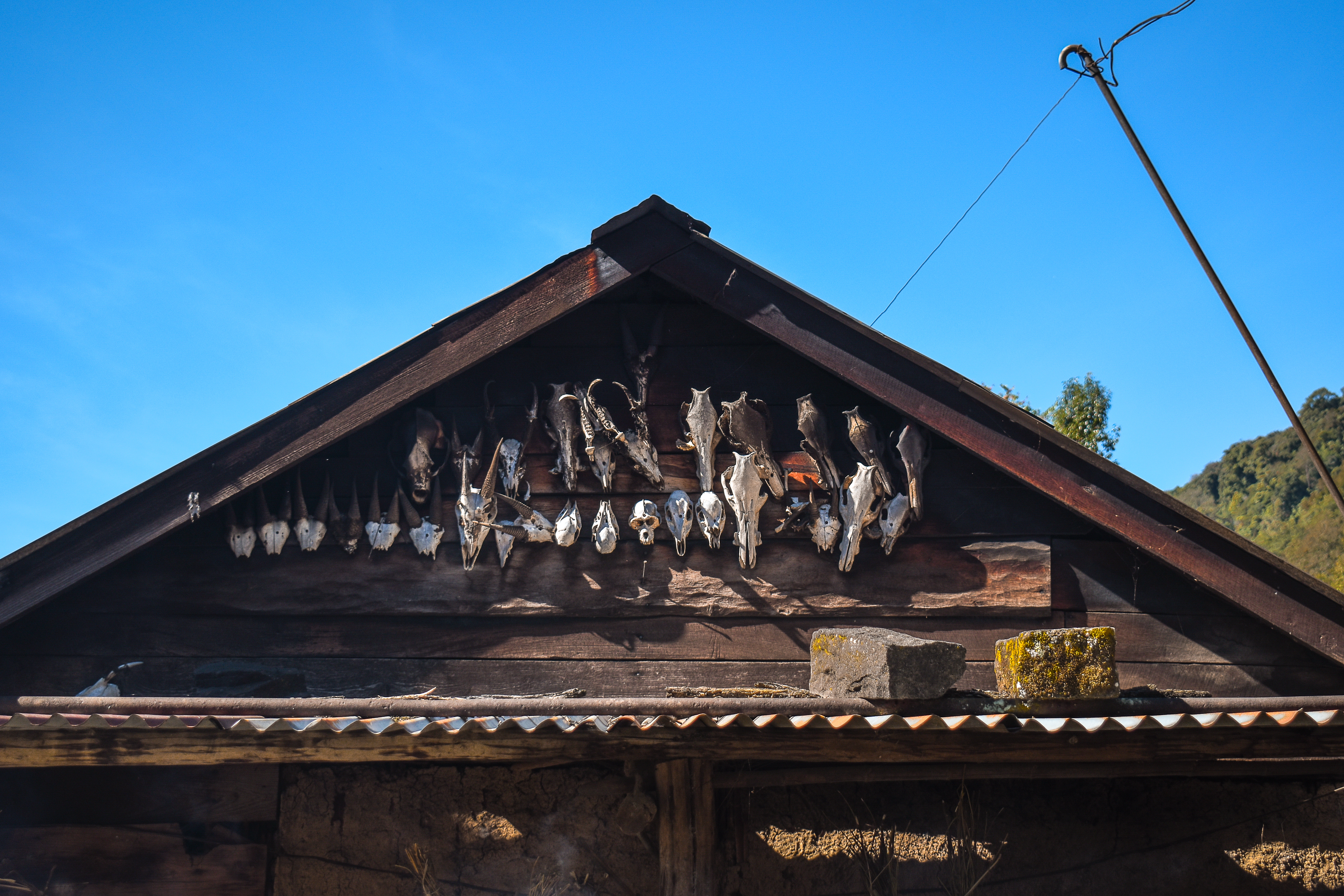
Hunted skulls at the entrance of a house in rural Nagaland

=== Festivals ===
Sümi Martyrs' Day observed for Sümi Warriors who died during Mukalimi Siege

Nagaland is known in India as the Land of Festivals. The diversity of people and ethnic groups, each with their own culture and heritage, creates a year-long atmosphere of celebrations. In addition, the state celebrates all Christian festivities. Traditional ethnic-related festivals revolve round agriculture, as a vast majority of the population of Nagaland is directly dependent on agriculture. Some of the significant festivals for each major ethnic groups are:

Ethnic groups	Festival	Celebrated in
Angami	Sekrenyi	February
Ao	Moatsü, Tsüngremong	May, August
Chakhesang	Tsükhenyie, Sükhrünyie	April/May, January
Chang	Naknyulüm, Kundanglüm	April, July
Dimasa Kachari	Bushu Jiba,	January, April
Khiamniungan	Miu, Tsoküm	May, October
Konyak	Aoleang, Lao-ong Mo	April, September
Kuki	Mimkut, Chavang Kut	January, November
Lotha	Tokhü Emong	November
Phom	Monyiü, Moha, Bongvüm	April, May, October
Pochury	Yemshe	October
Rengma	Ngada	November
Sangtam	Mungmung	September
Rongmei	Gaan-ngai	January
Sümi	Ahuna, Tülüni	November, July
Yimkhiungrü	Metümnyo, Tsungkamniu	August, January
Zeliang	Hega, Langsimyi/Chaga Gadi and Mileinyi	February, October, March

==== Hornbill Festival ====
The Hornbill Festival was launched by the Government of Nagaland in December 2000 to encourage inter-ethnic interaction and to promote cultural heritage of the state.

It is held at the Kisama Heritage Village which is about 12 km south of Kohima. All the ethnic groups of Nagaland take part in this festival. The aim of the festival is to revive and protect the rich culture of Nagaland and display its history, culture and traditions.

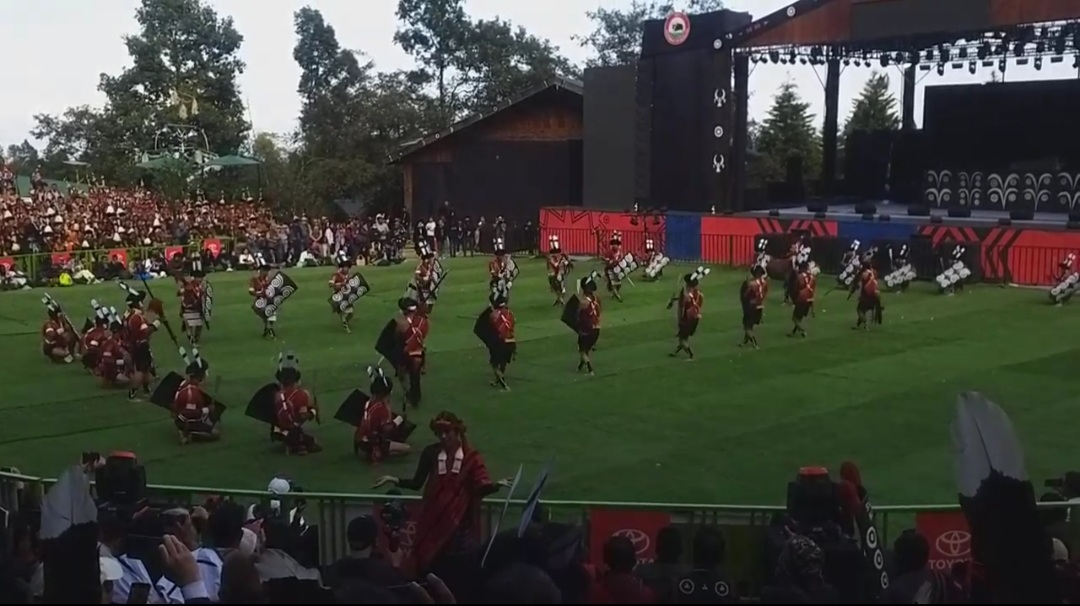
Hornbill Festival, Nagaland

The festival is named after the hornbill bird, which is displayed in folklores in most of the state's ethnic groups. The week-long festival unites Nagaland and people enjoy the colourful performances, crafts, sports, food fairs, games, and ceremonies. Traditional arts which include paintings, wood carvings, and sculptures are on display. Festival highlights include traditional Naga Morungs exhibition and sale of arts and crafts, food stalls, herbal medicine stalls, shows and sales, cultural medley – songs and dances, fashion shows, beauty contest, traditional archery, naga wrestling, indigenous games, and musical concerts. Additional attractions include the Konyak fire eating demonstration, pork-fat eating competitions, the Hornbill Literature Festival (including the Hutton Lectures), Hornbill Global Film Fest, Hornbill Ball, Choral Panorama, North East India Drum Ensemble, Naga King Chilli eating competition, Hornbill National Rock Contest, Hornbill International Motor Rally and WW-II Vintage Car Rally.

=== Sports ===
==== Kene ====
Kene or Naga wrestling is a folk wrestling style and traditional sport of the Nagas.

==== Aki Kiti ====
Aki Kiti or Sümi kick fighting is a traditional combat sport originating from and was practised by the Sümi Nagas. It is characterised by kicking and blocking solely using the soles of the feet. The sporting event served the purpose of righting wrongs, restoring honour, or "settling scores" between tribes and tribesmen without resorting to violence. It was practised during tribal ceremonies.

=== Historical rituals ===
==== Feasts of Merit ====
In Naga society, individuals were expected to find their place in the social hierarchy, and prestige was the key to maintaining or increasing social status. To achieve these goals a man, whatever his ascendancy, had to be a headhunter or great warrior, have many sexual conquests among women, or complete a series of merit feasts.

The Feasts of Merit reflected the splendor and celebration of Naga life. Only married men could give such Feasts, and his wife took a prominent and honoured place during the ritual which emphasised male-female co-operation and interdependence. His wife brewed the beer which he offered to the guests. The event displayed ceremonies and festivities organised by the sponsor. The Feast given by a wealthier community person would be more extravagant. He would typically invite everyone from the ethnic group. This event bestowed honour to the couple from the community. After the Feast, the tribe would give the couple rights to ornaments equally.

== Education ==
Nagaland's schools are run by the state and central government or by a private organisation. Instruction is mainly in English – the official language of Nagaland. Under the 10+2+3 plan, after passing the Higher Secondary Examination (the grade 12 examination), students may enroll in general or professional degree programs.

Nagaland has three autonomous colleges:

- St. Joseph's College, Jakhama
- Kohima Science College, Jotsoma
- Patkai Christian College, Chümoukedima

Along with one central university—Nagaland University, one engineering college—National Institute of Technology, one medical college— Nagaland Institute of Medical Science and Research, one College of Veterinary Science and Animal Husbandry in Jalukie and three private Universities—St. Joseph University, Northeast Christian University (NECU) and Institute of Chartered Financial Analysts of India University (ICFAI University).

== Tourism ==
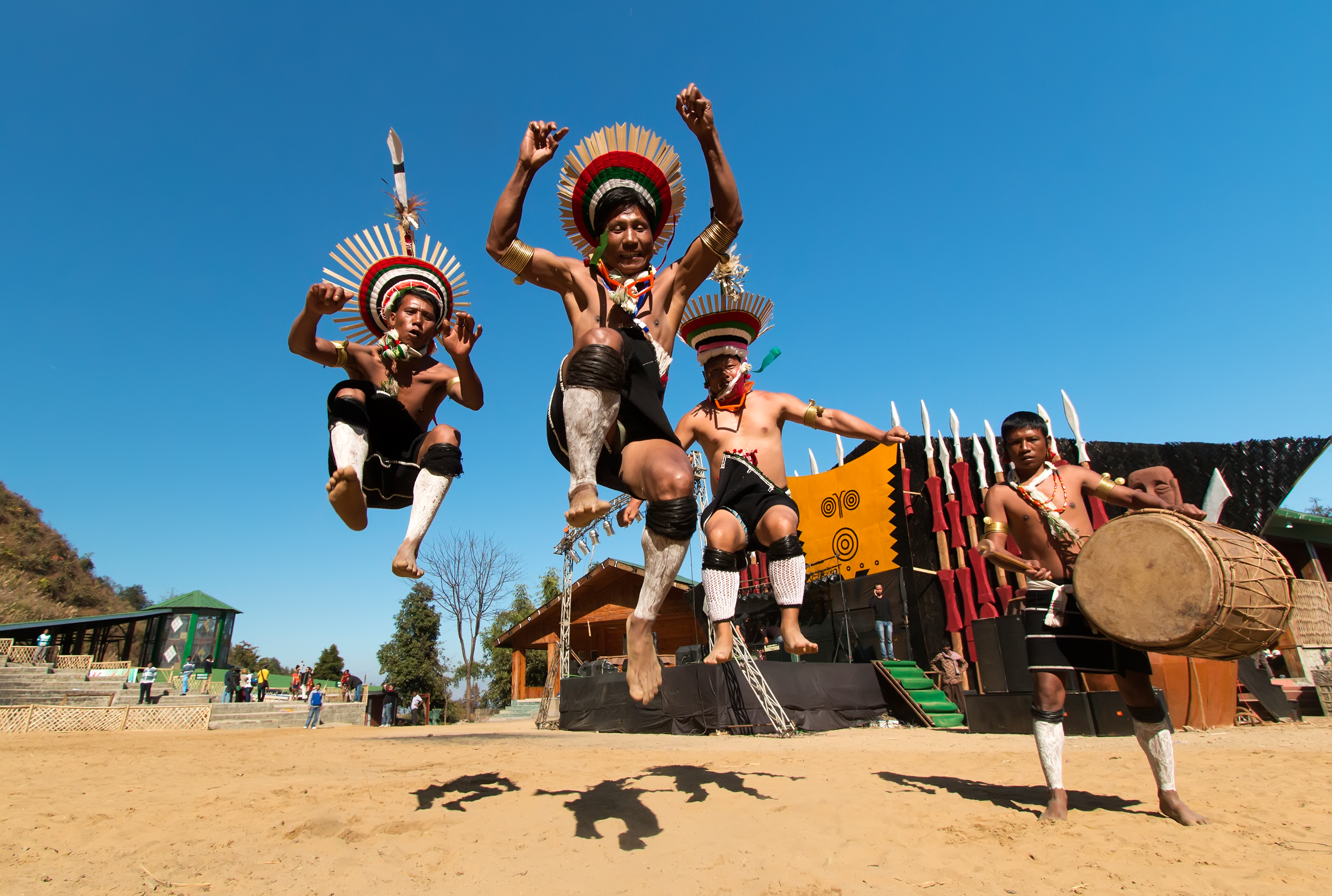
Hornbill Festival

Tourism experts contend that the state's uniqueness and strategic location in northeast India give Nagaland an advantage in tapping into the tourism sector for economic growth. The state has been extremely successful in promoting the great Hornbill Festival, which attracts Indian and foreign tourists alike.The key thrusts of Nagaland's tourism are its rich culture, showcasing of history and wildlife. Tourism infrastructure is rapidly improving. Local initiatives and tourism pioneers are now beginning to promote a socially responsible tourism model involving the participation of the councils, village elders, the church and the youth.

== Notability ==
The Naga Mircha is a variety of chilli mainly grown in this state. They are one of the world's hottest chillies and an indigenous treasure of Nagaland, deeply rooted in the region's lifestyle since ancient times. For generations, farmers in Nagaland's chilli-growing areas have cultivated it relying on it as a primary source of income and livelihood. This iconic chilli is an integral part of Nagaland's culinary identity, inseparably linked to the local community as a staple ingredient.

=== Geographical indication ===
It was awarded the Geographical Indication (GI) status tag from the Geographical Indications Registry under the Union Government of India on 2 December 2008 (valid until 21 August 2027).

The Secretary, Department of Horticulture & Agriculture, Government of Nagaland, from Kohima, proposed the GI registration of Naga Mircha. After filing the application in August 2007, the chilli was granted the GI tag in 2008 by the Geographical Indication Registry in Chennai, making the name "Naga Mircha" exclusive to the chilies grown in the region. It thus became the first chilli variety from Nagaland and the first type of goods from Nagaland to earn the GI tag.

== See also ==
- Outline of Nagaland
- Index of Nagaland-related articles

== Sources ==
- Scott, James George (1967), Hsenwi State Chronicle
- Luce, G.H; Htway, Tin (1976), "A 15th Century Inscription and Library at Pagán, Burma", Malalasekera Commemoration Volume. Colombo: The Malalasekera Commemoration Volume Editorial Committee, Dept of Pali and Buddhist Studies, University of Ceylon, pp. 203–256
- Gogoi, Padmeswar (1956). The political expansion of the Mao Shans.
