= Meluri district =

District in Nagaland

- District of Nagaland
- Nickname: Land of Fortune
- Interactive map of Meluri district
- Coordinates: 25.6833°N 94.6274°E
- Country: India
- State: Nagaland
- Headquarters: Meluri

Government
  - Lok Sabha Constituency: Nagaland
  - MP: Supongmeren Jamir INC
  - Deputy Commissioner: Mhathung Tsanglao (NCS)
  - Assembly constituencies: 1 constituencies

Population (2011)
  - Total: 22,558
- Time zone: UTC+05:30 (IST)
- Website: Meluri

Meluri district is a district in the Indian state of Nagaland. It was notified as the 17th district on November 2, 2024.

== History ==
Meluri was established as a 'Chairman Bench Court' in 1958, which was upgraded to Circle Officer in 1959. It was elevated to Assistant Commissioner-II, then to Extra Assistant Commissioner in 1969, Sub-Divisional Office (SDO) in 1981, and finally to a Sub-Division (ADC) in 2008. The creation of a separate district has been a long-term demand of the Pochury Nagas. In October 2024, the district was created by carving it out of Phek District.

== Administration ==
It covers an area of 1,011 sq km. There are 31 recognized villages, one Town Council (Meluri Town Council) and three EAC administrative headquarters in the district. It is part of Meluri Assembly constituency

== Demographics ==
The then Meluri sub-division of Phek District had a population of 22,558 in 2011 and is populated mostly by the Pochury Nagas.
