= Phom language =

Sino-Tibetan language spoken in India

Phom
- Native to: India
- Region: Nagaland
- Native speakers: 54,416 (2011 estimation)
- Language family: Sino-Tibetan: Konyak–Phom; Konyak; Phom

Language codes
- ISO 639-3: nph
- Glottolog: phom1236
- ELP: Phom Naga

Phom is a Sino-Tibetan language spoken by the Phom Nagas of Nagaland, Northeast India. Its speakers are primarily in Longleng district and few parts of bordering districts. The Phom language is written in Latin script and consists of 27 letters.

Alternate names for Phom language includes Phom, Phom shah. "Shah" is the Phom word for language. A Morung is called Pang and log drums, popular in Phom tradition are referred to as Shem.

== Phonology ==
All phonological charts are from Burling (1998).

Consonants
		Bilabial	Alveolar	Postalveolar	Palatal	Velar	Glottal
Stop	aspirated	pʰ	tʰ	ʈ͡ʂʰ		kʰ	
Stop	unaspirated	p	t	ʈ͡ʂ		k	
Fricative	voiceless			ʂ			h
Fricative	voiced			ʐ			
Nasal		m	n		ɲ	ŋ	
Approximant		w	l		j		

== Vocabulary ==
A large part of the vocabulary of Phom is inherited from proto-Sino-Tibetan.

Meaning	Old Chinese	Written Tibetan	Written Burmese	Phom
"I"	吾 *ŋa	nga	ŋa	ngei
"you"	汝 *njaʔ	–	naŋ	nüng
"not"	無 *mja	ma	ma'	nüvai
"two"	二 *njijs	gnyis	hnac < *hnit	nyi
"three"	三 *sum	gsum	sûm	jem
"five"	五 *ŋaʔ	lnga	ŋâ	nga
"six"	六 *C-rjuk	drug	khrok < *khruk	vok
"sun", "day"	日 *njit	nyi-ma	ne < *niy	nyih
"name"	名 *mjeŋ	ming	ə-mañ < *ə-miŋ	men
"eye"	目 *mjuk	mig	myak	mük
"fish"	魚 *ŋja	nya	ŋâ	nyah
"dog"	犬 *kʷʰenʔ	khyi	khwe < *khuy	shi
