= List of people from Kohima =

The following is a list of people who were born in, residents of, or otherwise closely associated with Kohima, and its surrounding metropolitan area.

== Born in Kohima ==
=== 20th century ===
==== 1900–1929 ====
- Phulchand Sethi (1911–1976), Businessperson
- Hari Prasad Gorkha Rai (1915–2005), Writer
- Khrielie-ü Kire (1918–2013), Physician
- Neichülie-ü Nikki Haralu (1918–2016), Indian Ambassador to Panama, Costa Rica and Nicaragua from 1978 to 1980
- Khuplam Milui Lenthang (1920–2014), Anthropologist, Doctor, and Ethnographer

==== 1930–1959 ====
- Shürhozelie Liezietsu (born 1936), 11th Chief Minister of Nagaland
- Chalie Kevichüsa (1943–1992), Journalist
- Neidonuo Angami (born 1950), Social worker and one of the founders of the Naga Mothers' Association
- P. Kilemsungla (born 1951), Educationist
- Methaneilie Solo (born 1955), Singer and Songwriter
- Easterine Kire (born 1959), Poet and Author

==== 1960–1979 ====
- Tseilhoutuo Rhütso (born 1974), Politician
- Mmhonlümo Kikon (born 1978), Politician

==== 1980–1999 ====
- Alobo Naga (born 1984), Singer and Songwriter
- Sesino Yhoshü (born 1986), Filmmaker
- Macnivil (born 1992), Rapper, Songwriter and Music video director
- Theja Rio (born 1995), Filmmaker
- Moko Koza (born 1996), Rapper and Songwriter

=== 21st century ===
- Andrea Kevichüsa (born 2001), Actress and Model

== Lived in Kohima ==
- Talimeren Ao, born in Changki; Footballer and the captain of the India national football team
- Imnainla Jamir, born in Mokokchung; Guitarist
- John Bosco Jasokie, born in Khonoma; fifth Chief Minister of Nagaland
- Neikezhakuo Kengurüse, born in Nerhema; Indian army officer
- Hekani Jakhalu Kense, born in Dimapur; Lawyer and Social entrepreneur
- Kevichüsa Angami, born in Khonoma; Politician and Member of Parliament, representing Nagaland in the Lok Sabha the lower house of India's Parliament.
- Razhukhrielie Kevichüsa, born in Tezpur; Bureaucrat and Musician
- Vizol Koso, born in Viswema; fourth Chief Minister of Nagaland
- Salhoutuonuo Kruse, born in Kiruphema, first woman to be elected to the Nagaland Legislative Assembly
- Thepfülo-u Nakhro, born in Jotsoma; second Chief Minister of Nagaland
- Zale Neikha, born in Viswema; Politician
- Kiyanilie Peseyie, born in Jotsoma; Politician
- Viswesül Pusa, born in Viswema; Politician
- Vizadel Sakhrie, born in Viswema; Politician
- Chotisüh Sazo, Politician
- Neiphiu Rio, born in Tuophema; Chief Minister of Nagaland
- Hovithal Sothü, born in Viswema; Educationist
- Zaku Zachariah Tsükrü, born in Viswema; Student and Public leader
- Neiliezhü Üsou, born in Nerhema; Baptist minister
- Lhüthiprü Vasa, born in Dzülhami; Politician
- Vikho-o Yhoshü, born in Kigwema; Politician
