= List of Naga people =

The following is a list of prominent people belonging to the Naga people.

== Artists ==
=== Actors/Actresses ===
- Zhokhoi Chüzho
- Andrea Kevichüsa

=== Filmmakers ===
- Theja Rio
- Sesino Yhoshü

=== Musicians ===
- Imnainla Jamir
- Jiangam Kamei (1963–2016)
- Silas Kikon (1956–2016)
- Temsu Clover
- Macnivil
- Moko Koza
- Rewben Mashangva
- Alobo Naga
- Methaneilie Solo

==== Musical groups and bands ====
- Tetseo Sisters

== Athletes ==
=== Archery ===
- Chekrovolü Swüro

=== Football ===
- Talimeren Ao (1918–1998)
- Makan Chote
- Grace Dangmei
- James Kithan
- Wungngayam Muirang
- Hormipam Ruivah
- Khwetelhi Thopi

=== Sepak takraw ===
- Viseyie Koso

=== Shot put ===
- Hokato Hotozhe Sema

== Entrepreneurs ==
- Zuboni Hümtsoe (1990–2017)
- Hekani Jakhalu Kense, Social Entrepreneur

== Politicians and Nationalist leaders ==
=== Nationalists Leaders ===
- Tubu Kevichüsa (1948–1996), General Secretary of the Naga National Council
- S. S. Khaplang (1940–2017), leader of NSCN-K
- Jadonang Malangmei (1905–1931), Naga spiritual leader and political activist
- Thuingaleng Muivah, present General Secretary of the NSCN-IM
- Gaidinliu Pamei (1915–1993), Naga spiritual and political leader who led a revolt against British rule in India
- A. Z. Phizo (1913–1990), leader of Naga National Council
- Isak Chishi Swu (1929–2016), chairman of the Nationalist Socialist Council of Nagaland
- Khodao Yanthan (1923–2010), member of Naga National Council

== Religious personalities ==
- Nitoy Achümi (1935–2005), Bible Translator
- Wati Aier, Theologian
- L. Kijungluba Ao (1906–97), baptist missionary
- Longri Ao (1906–1981) missionary to the Konyak Nagas
- S. Anungla, first woman pastor among the Chang Nagas
- Neiliezhü Üsou (1941–2009), influential Baptist preacher and church musician

== Scholars and writers ==
=== Poets and writers ===
- Temsüla Ao (1945–2022), poet, short story writer and ethnographer
- Monalisa Changkija, author and journalist
- Easterine Kire, author and poet
- Kanrei Shaiza, interpreter and writer

=== Scholars ===
- Mayangnokcha Ao (1901–1988), educationist and writer
- Piyong Temjen Jamir (1934–2021)
- Gangmumei Kamei (1939–2017), historian and politician
- Darlando Khathing, former vice chancellor of Central University of Jharkhand
- Dolly Kikon
- P. Kilemsungla, educationist
- Shürhozelie Liezietsu, Tenyidie scholar and politician
- Abraham Lotha, anthropologist

== Social activists ==
- Neidonuo Angami, social worker; shortlisted for the Nobel Peace Prize in 2000
- Alana Golmei, rights activist
- Ramkuiwangbe Newme, social and educational activist
- Ringyuichon Vashum, activist

== Other notables ==
=== Agriculturists ===
- Melhite Kenye (1922–2022), Pastor and Agriculturist

=== Bureaucrats and Government Officials ===
- Neichülie-ü Nikki Haralu (1918–2016), former Indian Ambassador to Panama
- Razhukhrielie Kevichüsa (1941–2022), bureaucrat and musician
- Ralengnao Khathing (1912–1990), Army soldier, civil servant and former Indian ambassador to Myanmar
- Armstrong Pame
- Hovithal Sothu

=== Journalists ===
- Bano Haralu
- Chalie Kevichüsa (1943–1992)

=== Judges ===
- H. K. Sema
- W. A. Shishak (1941–2023)

=== Military and gallantry award recipients ===
- Keishing Clifford Nongrum (1975–1999), Kargil martyr and Maha Vir chakra awardee
- Neikezhakuo Kengurüse (1974–1999), Kargil martyr and Mahavir chakra awardee

=== Physicians ===
- Khrielie-ü Kire (1918–2013)
- Vizadel Sakhrie (1943–1995)

=== Public leaders ===
- Zaku Zachariah Tsükrü (1947–2017)

== See also ==
- List of people of Angami descent
- List of people by nationality
