= Music of Nagaland =

Nagaland is inhabited by 15 major tribes along with other sub-tribes. Each tribe is distinct in character in terms of customs, language and dress. It is a land of folklore passed down the generations through word of mouth. Here, music is an integral part of life.

== Folk music ==
The oral tradition is kept alive through the media of folk tales and songs. Naga folk songs are both romantic and historical, narrating entire stories of famous ancestors and incidents. There are also seasonal songs which describe various activities done in a particular agricultural season. The themes of the folk music and songs are many; songs eulogizing ancestors, the brave deeds of warriors and traditional heroes; and poetic love songs immortalizing ancient tragic love stories.

Li are folk songs of the Chakesang tribe of Nagaland, India. It often takes the place of conversation and is known to beautifully communicate feelings, ideas and engage people in a circle of warmth and friendship.

== Indigenous instruments ==
There are several rhythmic instruments that aptly accompany the Nagaland music. The area's folk music is dominated by string instruments like the Tati (single string fiddle) and Theku among the Chakhesangs and Angami Nagas, Asem (drum with animal skin masked upon carved wood) and Jemji (Horn made using mithun horn). Indigenous musical instruments extensively used by the people are bamboo mouth organs, cup violins, bamboo flutes, trumpets, drums made of cattle skin, and log drums. Each tribe has unique traditional instruments influenced by their customs and materials available.

== Modern music ==
Two distinct genres of music exist in Nagaland:

- the choral/church/Christian type commonly known as gospel music and
- the rock/pop genre commonly known as secular music.

Both types have their own distinct platforms, but their audience is by and large the same. In Nagaland, the platform for choral music is created by the church during conferences and crusades (special numbers, praise and worship etc.). Exclusive gospel concerts are also initiated by local churches, theological institutions or individuals. One prominent artist who has pioneered the "Contemporary Christian music" in the state's Gospel genre is Tali Angh who started his journey first as a worship leader in a church. Naga Choirs travel not only to places outside the state but also to foreign countries in order to perform for various world audiences. Many Naga musicians adopt traditional and folk tunes to lend a distinctive individuality to their music. Two prominent groups adopting traditional folk tunes into their music are: The Tetseo Sisters and Cultural Vibrants. Tribal tunes have also been incorporated into choral pieces and sung by many church choirs.

The rock/pop genre, platforms in terms of concerts and rock festivals are created generally by the concerned music fraternity themselves. The state has produced Internationally acclaimed Bands like "Abiogenesis" and "Alobo Naga & the Band". The latter has been nominated for the MTV Europe Music Awards 2012 for their hit debut single Painted Dreams. This song has been ranked fourth at Cherokee America (India) presents VH1 Top 10 (for the week) on 17 September competing with artists like Maroon 5, Lady Gaga and Jay-Z etc.

There are several long-running modern bands, such as The Great Society, Phynyx, Graffiti, Squadron and the 4th NAP Jazz Band, the official band of the Battalion of Nagaland Armed Police. Some notable present day bands are- Black Rose, Divine Connection (DC), Eximious, Original Fire Factor (OFF), Diatribe and Daughty Growthy.

One can listen to most of the songs and music organically produced in Nagaland on indihut, and HIYOMUSIC Mobile App.

=== Music as a subject ===
Realizing the importance of music in Nagaland and the interest shown by the Naga youngsters, the Nagaland Board of School Education (NBSE) introduced music as a subject in the High School and Higher Secondary curriculum recently.

== Task Force For Music & Arts ==
The Task Force For Music & Arts of Nagaland is a recent phenomenon. It was created by the Government to encourage Naga musicians to take up music as a profession rather than a hobby. Music is an integral part of the life of the Nagas and is now being developed as an industry that generates employment.

== Hornbill National Rock Contest ==
The Nagaland Government, and most specifically with the initiative of the Chief Minister Neiphiu Rio, started the Hornbill National Rock Contest which is an integral event of the Hornbill Festival. The Hornbill National Rock Contest, as the name suggests, is a National-level contest and boasts of being the longest music festival in the country, it being a seven-day-long festival. Attractive cash prizes and music educated/music loving crowd makes the Hornbill National Rock Contest/Festival a unique experience for performers. The winning prize of ₹10,00,000 (10 lakh of rupees) is considered to be one of the highest in the country.

== Native Trax Nagaland ==
The Native Trax Society (NTS) consists of people dedicated to creating a climate of professionalism and artistic excellence and to create awareness and appreciation of the music and culture of Nagaland. It consists of singers, musicians and people actively involved in the local music and culture scene having a common vision to promote the music and culture of Nagaland beyond the confines of the state. In addition to other events, the Native Trax Society conducts the annual Music Awards of Nagaland to honor the best songs and music videos in various genres produced by Naga musicians each year. The Music Awards of Nagaland were instituted in 2009 by the Native Trax Society.
