= List of Rajya Sabha members from Nagaland =

The list of current and past Rajya Sabha members from the Nagaland State. The state elects 1 member for a term of 6 years indirectly elected by the state legislators, since year 1964.

== List of all Rajya Sabha members from Nagaland state ==
Name	Party	Date of appointment	Date of retirement	Term	Notes
Mülhüpra Vero	INC	18/03/1964	02/04/1968	1	
Mülhüpra Vero	INC	03/04/1968	02/04/1974	2	Res. 02/03/1974
Khyomo Lotha	Others	04/03/1974	04/02/1980	1	
T. Aliba Imti	Others	03/04/1980	02/04/1986	1	
Hokishe Sema	INC	03/04/1986	02/04/1992	1	Res.04/05/1987 NG Assbly CM, Nagaland
S. C. Jamir	INC	02/07/1987	02/04/1992	1	bye Hokishe Sema; res 02/02/1989 ele NG Assbly CM, Nagaland
Khyomo Lotha	INC	08/06/1989	02/04/1992	2	bye 89 r S. C. Jamir
Vizol Koso	Others	03/04/1992	02/04/1998	1	
C. Apok Jamir	INC	03/04/1998	02/04/2004	1	
T. R. Zeliang	NPF	03/04/2004	02/04/2010	1	24/03/2008 Elected to NG Assembly
H. Khekiho Zhimomi	NPF	04/07/2008	02/04/2010	1	Bye r T. R. Zeliang
H. Khekiho Zhimomi	NPF	03/04/2010	02/04/2016	2	Died 26/11/2015
K. G. Kenye	NPF	03/04/2016	02/04/2022	1	
Phangnon Konyak	BJP	03/04/2022	02/04/2028	1	Current member
