= Ministers' Hill Baptist Higher Secondary School =

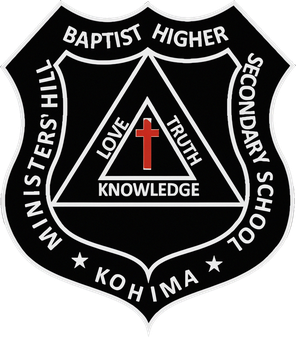

Location
- Old Ministers' Hill Ward, Kohima, Nagaland, India; 25.656518°N 94.093194°E

Information
- School type: Higher Secondary School
- Motto: Love, Truth, Knowledge; Aim For Perfection
- Established: 20 February 1968; 58 years ago
- Principal: Jongshijiba Ozüküm
- Faculty: 58
- Grades: Kindergarten (A-B) – 12
- Gender: Coeducational
- Age: 5 to 18
- Affiliation: Nagaland Board of School Education (NBSE)
- Houses: (Blue) (Green) (Red) (Yellow)
- Website: mhbhss.in

Ministers' Hill Baptist Higher Secondary School is a Baptist private school in Kohima in the Indian state of Nagaland providing both high school and higher secondary school education. The school was previously known as Ministers' Hill Baptist English School.

== Campus ==
The school is situated at an altitude of 1,444 metres above sea level on the road leading to Kohima Science College, Jotsoma. It is sandwiched between the locality of Old Ministers' Hill Ward and Agri Farm Ward, Kohima.

== History ==
Ministers' Hill Baptist English School was established on 20 February 1968 and is sponsored by the Ministers' Hill Baptist Church.

The records of the school go back to more than three decades when the school was taken over by the church under the pastorship of Rev. Dr. Neiliezhü Üsou on 16 December 1981.

The school was upgraded to Higher Secondary in 1998 and named as Ministers' Hill Baptist Higher Secondary School with its first batch appearing for the HSSLC Examination in 2001 and it continues to be the centre of the HSLC/HSSLC Examinations since 1998.

== Curriculum ==
Over the years, the school has gotten excellent results both in HSLC and HSSLC Examinations.

The school provides Arts stream courses for the Higher Secondary section.

Music, Book Keeping & Accountancy and IIT classes are optional subjects conducted for grades 9 and 10. Tenyidie is also an optional subject starting from grade 7. The school is affiliated to the Nagaland Board of School Education (NBSE).

== Extra-curricular activities ==
Members of the four houses - Blue/Green/Red/Yellow explore the important events in the form of weekly notice board maintenance and enrichment activities in a variety of ways. Staff and students participate in Charity works on various important occasions.

Annual sports are conducted with different sport activities held in competition. The school also participates in inter-school sports events.

The school has been declared as a TOBACCO FREE SCHOOL on 14 September 2016 by the District Tobacco Control Cell, Kohima.

== Notable alumni ==
=== Politics ===
- Salhoutuonuo Kruse, the first woman to be elected to the Nagaland Legislative Assembly

=== Entertainment ===
- Moko Koza, Rapper and Songwriter
- Macnivil, Rapper and Songwriter

== See also ==
- List of higher education and academic institutions in Kohima
- List of schools in Nagaland
