= Ladakh International Music Festival =

Music festival in India

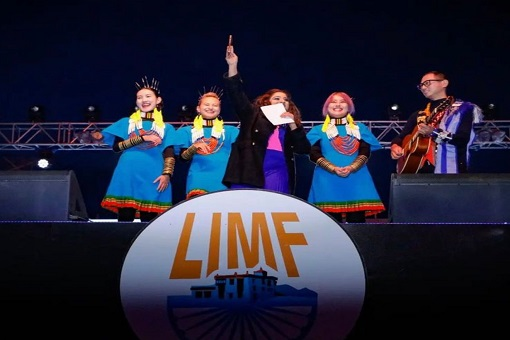
- ‘LIMF’ 2022 at Col Sonam Wangchuk Stadium, Leh
- Genre: Folk music
- Locations: Ladakh, India
- Country: India
- Years active: 2022-present
- Inaugurated: 30 April 2022
- Founder: Indian Army
- Website: Official website

The Ladakh International Music Festival (LIMF) is an annual music festival held in Ladakh region of India. It aims to celebrate local culture, art, music and community.

Started in 2022, the festival is organised every year by the Ministry of Culture and Tourism Department of the Union Territory of Ladakh, Ladakh Autonomous Hill Development Council, Leh (LAHIDC), Ladakh Art and Entertainment Alliance (LAEA) and Indian Army in collaboration with private media companies.

== History ==
The festival was first organised from 30 April 2022 to 2 May 2022 at Sonam Wangchuk Stadium in Leh. It was hosted by PictureTime media house in collaboration with the Indian Army.

The festival paid tribute to the martyrs of the Galwan incident and war veterans of the Indian Army at Rezang La (18,045 ft) on 4 May 2022 by launching the Rezang La anthem. Musicians from across the country such as Joi Barau, and Tetseo Sisters, and bands including Indian Ocean along with six local bands from Leh, performed for the event.

== Programming ==
The festival is aimed at paying tribute to the martyrs of Indian Army and to showcase local talent, music, culture, art and community.

== 2023 edition ==
The 2013 edition included fashion show at the world’s highest paved road, Umling La, in an attempt to achieve a Guinness world record. The event was hosted by Ladakh Art and Entertainment Alliance in collaboration with the Ladakh Autonomous Hill Development Council and the Indian Army.
