= Ministers' Hill Baptist Church =

- MHBC
- Ministers' Hill Baptist Church
- 25.6566°N 94.0931°E
- Location: Kohima, Nagaland, India
- Denomination: Baptist

History
- Founded: 20 November 1966; 59 years ago
- Founder: Risoi Khesoh
- Dedication: Rev. Dr. Neiliezhü Üsou
- Dedicated: 22 December 2002

Architecture
- Years built: 1996–2002
- Groundbreaking: 7 July 1996
- Completed: 22 December 2002

Clergy
- Pastor: Neino Zhotso

Ministers' Hill Baptist Church is a Baptist church located in the locality of the Old Ministers' Hill Ward, Kohima in the Indian state of Nagaland. The church building was opened in 2002, although the Baptist congregation had been formed since 1966. It is one of the oldest Angami Baptist churches in Kohima city.

== History ==
The congregation was formed on 20 November 1966. Before this the youths and elders use to organized several fellowships together. The church building was originally a Government Quarter Type I Building.

Risoi Khesoh of Yorübama was appointed as the first pastor with Hosasül Viswentso of Jakhama as the first C.E chairman and Vichünyü and Puthitso as the first deacons of the church.

On 1 October 1978, Neiliezhü Üsou was installed as a full-time Pastor of the church and was later ordained on 20 December 1981.

Foundations for the new church building was laid on 7 July 1996 and was dedicated on 22 December 2002.

Neiliezhü Üsou died on 30 January 2009 and Tepusaho Tase was installed as the Senior Pastor.

== Notable church members ==
- Salhoutuonuo Kruse, the first woman to be elected to the Nagaland Legislative Assembly

== See also ==
- Ministers' Hill Baptist Higher Secondary School
- Christianity in Nagaland
