= Southern Angami II Assembly constituency =

Nagaland Lok Sabha constituency

Southern Angami II
- Constituency No. 15 for the Nagaland Legislative Assembly

Constituency details
- Country: India
- Region: Northeast India
- State: Nagaland
- District: Kohima
- Lok Sabha constituency: Nagaland
- Established: 1964
- Total electors: 17,808
- Reservation: ST

Member of Legislative Assembly
- 14th Nagaland Legislative Assembly
- Incumbent Kropol Vitsu
- Party: Bharatiya Janata Party
- Elected year: 2023

Southern Angami II is one of the 60 Legislative Assembly constituencies of Nagaland state in India. It is part of Kohima district and is reserved for candidates belonging to the Scheduled Tribes. The constituency is also a part of the Nagaland Lok Sabha constituency. As of 2018, 17504 eligible voters were registered in the constituency.

== Members of the Legislative Assembly ==
Election	Name	Party
1964	Vizol Koso	Independent
1966★	Hosal Kin	Nagaland Nationalist Organisation
1969	Hosal Kin	Nagaland Nationalist Organisation
1974	Vizol Koso	United Democratic Front
1977	Vizol Koso	United Democratic Front
1982	Vizadel Sakhrie	Independent
1987	Vizadel Sakhrie	Indian National Congress
1989	Vizadel Sakhrie	Naga People's Front
1993	Viswesül Pusa	Independent
1998	Viswesül Pusa	Indian National Congress
2003	Viswesül Pusa	Indian National Congress
2008	Viswesül Pusa	Indian National Congress
2013	Kropol Vitsu	Naga People's Front
2018	Zale Neikha	Nationalist Democratic Progressive Party
2023	Kropol Vitsu	Bharatiya Janata Party

★by-election

== Election results ==
=== 2023 Assembly election ===
2023 Nagaland Legislative Assembly election: Southern Angami II
Party	Candidate	Votes	%	±%
BJP	Kropol Vitsu	5,985	36.97%	
NCP	Zale Neikha	5,535	34.19%	
JD(U)	Vipopal Kintso	4,624	28.56%	
NOTA	Nota	44	0.27%	
Margin of victory		450	2.78%	−2.58%
Turnout		16,188	90.90%	8.68%
Registered electors		17,808		1.74%
BJP gain from NDPP		Swing	-15.57%	

=== 2018 Assembly election ===
2018 Nagaland Legislative Assembly election: Southern Angami II
Party	Candidate	Votes	%	±%
NDPP	Zale Neikha	7,563	52.55%	
NPF	Kropol Vitsu	6,792	47.19%	−20.02%
NOTA	None of the Above	38	0.26%	
Margin of victory		771	5.36%	−29.12%
Turnout		14,393	82.23%	−10.34%
Registered electors		17,504		2.49%
NDPP gain from NPF		Swing	-14.66%	

=== 2013 Assembly election ===
2013 Nagaland Legislative Assembly election: Southern Angami II
Party	Candidate	Votes	%	±%
NPF	Kropol Vitsu	10,626	67.21%	33.42%
INC	Viswesül Pusa	5,175	32.73%	−4.87%
Margin of victory		5,451	34.48%	30.67%
Turnout		15,810	92.57%	8.64%
Registered electors		17,079		5.35%
NPF gain from INC		Swing	29.61%	

=== 2008 Assembly election ===
2008 Nagaland Legislative Assembly election: Southern Angami II
Party	Candidate	Votes	%	±%
INC	Viswesül Pusa	5,116	37.60%	−18.68%
NPF	Dr. Atha Vizol	4,598	33.79%	−9.93%
Independent	Swedehol Sale	3,939	28.95%	
Margin of victory		518	3.81%	−8.74%
Turnout		13,607	84.22%	−1.47%
Registered electors		16,212		42.55%
INC hold		Swing	-18.68%	

=== 2003 Assembly election ===
2003 Nagaland Legislative Assembly election: Southern Angami II
Party	Candidate	Votes	%	±%
INC	Viswesül Pusa	5,466	56.28%	
NPF	Zaku Zachariah Tsükrü	4,247	43.72%	
Margin of victory		1,219	12.55%	
Turnout		9,713	85.40%	2.04%
Registered electors		11,373		10.49%
INC hold		Swing	8.56%	

=== 1998 Assembly election ===
1998 Nagaland Legislative Assembly election: Southern Angami II
Party	Candidate	Votes	%	±%
INC	Viswesül Pusa	Unopposed		
Margin of victory				
Registered electors		10,293		13.22%
INC gain from Independent		Swing		

=== 1993 Assembly election ===
1993 Nagaland Legislative Assembly election: Southern Angami II
Party	Candidate	Votes	%	±%
Independent	Viswesül Pusa	3,572	47.72%	
INC	Vizadel Sakhrie	2,948	39.38%	−9.66%
NPF	Zaku Zachariah Tsükrü	966	12.90%	−38.05%
Margin of victory		624	8.34%	6.42%
Turnout		7,486	83.37%	−2.54%
Registered electors		9,091		45.39%
Independent gain from NPF		Swing	-3.24%	

=== 1989 Assembly election ===
1989 Nagaland Legislative Assembly election: Southern Angami II
Party	Candidate	Votes	%	±%
NPF	Vizadel Sakhrie	2,715	50.96%	
INC	Viswesül Pusa	2,613	49.04%	9.86%
Margin of victory		102	1.91%	0.13%
Turnout		5,328	85.91%	−1.11%
Registered electors		6,253		1.74%
NPF gain from INC		Swing	11.78%	

=== 1987 Assembly election ===
1987 Nagaland Legislative Assembly election: Southern Angami II
Party	Candidate	Votes	%	±%
INC	Vizadel Sakhrie	2,080	39.18%	38.52%
NND	Vizol Koso	1,985	37.39%	14.57%
Independent	Neikhaho Rhetso	1,178	22.19%	
NPP	Hovizo	66	1.24%	
Margin of victory		95	1.79%	−1.04%
Turnout		5,309	87.02%	6.93%
Registered electors		6,146		−10.51%
INC gain from Independent		Swing	9.18%	

=== 1982 Assembly election ===
1982 Nagaland Legislative Assembly election: Southern Angami II
Party	Candidate	Votes	%	±%
Independent	Vizadel Sakhrie	1,635	29.99%	
Independent	Pusazo Neikha	1,481	27.17%	
NND	Vizol Koso	1,244	22.82%	
Independent	Neikhaho Rhetso	1,055	19.35%	
INC	Zeliezhü Natso	36	0.66%	
Margin of victory		154	2.83%	
Turnout		5,451	80.08%	80.08%
Registered electors		6,868		26.74%
Independent gain from UDA		Swing		

=== 1977 Assembly election ===
1977 Nagaland Legislative Assembly election: Southern Angami II
Party	Candidate	Votes	%	±%
UDA	Vizol Koso	Unopposed		
Margin of victory				
Registered electors		5,419		6.05%
UDA hold		Swing		

=== 1974 Assembly election ===
1974 Nagaland Legislative Assembly election: Southern Angami II
Party	Candidate	Votes	%	±%
UDA	Vizol Koso	2,410	63.57%	
NNO	Pusazo Neikha	934	24.64%	−27.00%
Independent	Hosal Kin	447	11.79%	
Margin of victory		1,476	38.93%	35.66%
Turnout		3,791	75.85%	−4.86%
Registered electors		5,110		35.22%
UDA gain from NNO		Swing	11.93%	

=== 1969 Assembly election ===
1969 Nagaland Legislative Assembly election: Southern Angami II
Party	Candidate	Votes	%	±%
NNO	Hosal Kin	1,575	51.64%	
UDF	Niza Naleo	1,475	48.36%	
Margin of victory		100	3.28%	
Turnout		3,050	80.71%	
Registered electors		3,779		
NNO hold		Swing		

=== 1966 Assembly by-election ===
1966 Nagaland Legislative Assembly by-election: Southern Angami II
Party	Candidate	Votes	%	±%
NNO	Hosal Kin	Unopposed		
NNO gain from Independent		Swing		

=== 1964 Assembly election ===
1964 Nagaland Legislative Assembly election: Southern Angami II
Party	Candidate	Votes	%	±%
Independent	Vizol Koso	1,696	60.18%	
Independent	Hosal Kin	1,122	39.82%	
Margin of victory		574	20.37%	
Turnout		2,818	87.03%	
Registered electors		3,238		
Independent win (new seat)				

== See also ==
- List of constituencies of the Nagaland Legislative Assembly
- Southern Angami I Assembly constituency
