= Nagaland Missionary Movement =

The Nagaland Missionary Movement (NMM) is a denominational mission organization under the Nagaland Baptist Church Council (NBCC), consisting of 20 Baptist associations with 1,325 local churches. It is the mission department of the Baptist Churches in Nagaland yet is autonomous in its functions. The NMM was founded in 1979 under the leadership of Longri Ao. It was the outcome of the revival in the region during the 1970s and the fundamental factor for establishing such an autonomous body for mission was the zeal for mission, to evangelize the world with the gospel of Jesus Christ.

The movement is an indigenous mission organization. Almost all the support and resources come from the local affiliated congregations and associations. Today the NMM has missionaries in many parts of India and beyond. Wherever missionaries are sent, a mission field is established and churches are planted. Some of the areas where the NMM gives more focus in today's mission within India include the Bhutan–India border, Arunachal Pradesh, Odisha, Assam, the Andaman and Nicobar Islands, Manipur, Tripura and West Bengal. The NMM has also sent missionaries to countries like Nepal, Cambodia, Thailand, Burma and Africa.

The administrative system of the NMM functions under the guidelines of the NBCC constitution where the Board of Mission is represented by the Mission Secretaries and Director of Mission from every member association. The office operates with the director as the head of department, and with an associate director, mission promoters, research coordinator, treasurer and office assistant.
