= Kropol Vitsu =

Indian politician

Member of Nagaland Legislative Assembly
- In office 10 March 2013 – 13 March 2018
- Preceded by: Viswesül Pusa
- Succeeded by: Zale Neikha
- Constituency: Southern Angami I
- In office 2 March 2023 – incumbent
- Preceded by: Zale Neikha

Personal details
- Born: 1964 (age 61–62) Viswema, Nagaland, India
- Party: Bharatiya Janata Party
- Education: University of Madras (B.E. (Civil))

Kropol Vitsu (born 1964) is an Indian politician from Nagaland. He was elected to the Nagaland Legislative Assembly from Southern Angami II Assembly constituency in 2013 as a candidate of the Naga People's Front during which he served as Parliamentary Secretary for Home Guards & Civil Defence under the T. R. Zeliang administration and in 2023 as a candidate of the Bharatiya Janata Party. He currently serves as the chief minister's Advisor on Prisons, Printing & Stationery. He was born in the Vitsu family of Angami Naga tribe.
