= Khyomo Lotha =

Indian politician

Member of Parliament, Rajya Sabha
- In office 4 March 1974 – 4 February 1980
- Preceded by: Mülhüpra Vero
- Succeeded by: T. Aliba Imti
- In office 8 June 1989 – 2 April 1992
- Preceded by: S. C. Jamir
- Succeeded by: Vizol Koso
- Constituency: Nagaland

Personal details
- Born: 2 May 1940 (age 85)
- Spouse: Khrieno Lotha

Khyomo Lotha is an Indian politician from Nagaland. He represented the state in the upper house of the Indian Parliament, the Rajya Sabha, for two terms.

== Political career ==
Lotha was the General Secretary of the Nagaland Nationalist Organisation from 1967-69.

In March 1975, Nagaland was brought under President's rule and the state assembly was placed under suspended animation. Lotha was a harsh critique of the move. He called it "most undemocratic" and a denial of the constitutional right of the majority party, United Democratic Front, to form the government. He alleged that the Central Government had engineered the toppling of the Vizol Koso government and demanded a parliamentary enquiry.

In 1980, when the Central Government declared Assam a 'disturbed area' under the Armed Forces (Special Powers) Act, Lotha signed a memorandum to the government opposing the move. It stated that the action was "yet another instance of the lack of a correct appraisal" of the problem in Assam, which concerned the whole of Northeast India.

In 1989, Lotha was elected to the Rajya Sabha for a second term, unopposed. The seat was vacated by S. C. Jamir on his election as the Chief Minister of Nagaland. The only opposition party in the state assembly, the Naga People's Council had boycotted the elections.

== Personal life ==
He is married to Khrieno Lotha. He has two daughters and three sons.
