= Mayangnokcha Ao =

Indian writer

Padma Shri Mayangnokcha Ao
- Born: 1901; Changki, Naga Hills District, Assam Province, British India (Now in Mokokchung District, Nagaland, India)
- Died: 1988 (aged 86–87)
- Occupations: Educationist; Writer
- Awards: Certificate of Gallantry 1945; Member of British Empire MBE 1946; Padma Shri 1984

Mayangnokcha Ao (1901–1988) was an Indian educationist and writer from Nagaland and the founder, Vice President of the Naga National Council.

== Early life ==
Hailing from the Ao Naga tribe, born in Changki village, Nagaland, he was the first graduate from the tribe and the first Naga headmaster of the Impur Mission Training M. E. School, the oldest school in the region, where he served from 1927 to 1940. In 1948, he was appointed as the headmaster of the Government High School Mokokchung. He was a member of the team which translated the Old Testament into Naga language and was the translator of the Psalms.

== Public life ==
The British Government awarded Mayangnokcha the 'Certificate of Gallantry' in 1945 and the 'Member of British Empire' MBE in 1946. The Government of India conferred on him the President's 'Best teacher' award in 1964, and awarded Mayangnokcha the fourth highest Indian civilian honour of Padma Shri in 1984.

In 1966, Ao was part of the five member-Nagaland Peace Commission formed in Kohima as an initiative of the Nagaland Baptist Church Council. It passed a resolution asking government authorities and public to strengthen peace work in Nagaland. Along with Ao, Vizol Koso, Nabakrushna Choudhuri, Lakshmi N. Menon, and Nivukha were part of the commission. They met the Naga underground leaders at Chedema.

== Death ==
On 29 February 1988, he died at the age of 86. His life has been documented in a biography, Mayangnokcha, the Pathfinder and the Government High School Mokokchung was renamed after him on 16 June 1994 as Mayangnokcha High School.

== Legacy ==
The Mayangnokcha Award Trust was instituted in 1993 to felicitate toppers in the state Higher Secondary Certificate exams conducted by the Nagaland Board of School Education. In 2021, five awards were conferred on students: academic excellence (overall topper), and subject toppers in Ao Naga language, Science, Mathematics, and English. They were awarded to Keneino Thorie, Atula W. Mongro, Yimyatetla Longkumer, Vibeli K. Achumi, and Tiamong Aier respectively.
