= Khuplam Milui Lenthang =

Indian anthropologist, doctor, and ethnographer

- Born: Kohima, Naga Hills, India.
- Died: 5 January 2014; New Lambulane, Imphal, Manipur, India
- Occupation: Research on Kuki origin

Khuplam Milui Lenthang (died January 2014) was an Indian anthropologist, doctor, and ethnographer specialising in the origins of the Kuki people.

== Early life ==
He was born at Kahui (Kohima). Thangjalam Milui Lenthang, his father, was a jawan in the Assam Rifles, posted at Kahui. He died when Khuplam was only a child, and his wife, Tingzakhol, brought up their son with a great deal of love and affection in spite of many difficulties.

Khuplam bore certain unusual signs and characteristics from his childhood. In later years, these inexplicable attributes began to make sense with regard to the research work on the origin, culture and traditions of the Manmasi or Manasseh (Kuki, Chin, Mizo) people, which has been a lifelong passion of his. As a boy, Khuplam was not keen on fun and games, a nature normal to other children. He spent hours together listening to elderly people who related stories, folklores and mythologies concerning the origins of the Kuki (historically Kuki was the collective terminology used to refer to the 'Kuki, Chin and Mizo' people) people of yore. Spending most of his time in the company of elderly folks who told their tales, his friends often referred to him as the 'old man'.

Khuplam started to collect the materials for his research work on the Manmasi people in 1949, when he was 29 years of age. He traveled extensively in the Chin Hills of Burma, various parts of Assam, Manipur, Lushai Hills, and Naga Hills and was able to compile a vast amount of resources. These resources form the basis of his book, The Wonderful Genealogical Tales of MANMASI (Kuki-Chin-Mizo), a product of lifelong labour of love.

After the death of his father, Dr. DD William, a European Christian missionary in Jorhat, cared for Khuplam like a family member. Khuplam was educated up to elementary school at Jorhat. With Dr. William's assistance he also did a three-year medical training at Medical College in Dibrugarh.

== Career ==
=== Medical career ===
Equipped with a professional qualification, he landed a government job as Licensed Medical Practitioner (LMP) in 1951. Although he did not receive complete formal education in medicine, given the condition of the time and the fact that modern western education had only recently been introduced in the region, the title of Doctor was deferentially 'bestowed' upon him thenceforth, he was referred to as Dr Khuplam.

Dr Khuplam served in the medical field for 7 years. His zeal for research work ultimately led him to resign from government service in 1957.

=== Ethnographic career ===
Subsequently, he set up office in 1967, at Phaibung village, Mikir Hills (Karbi Anglong district) in Assam. There he resumed work on a full-time basis on the subject dearest to his heart. Later the same year, he shifted the office to Saikul in Manipur, where he continued his vocation, depending solely on the materials he had previously collected. For several years, progress in his work was rather difficult and slow. Many of the folktales, mythologies and the words for chanting used by the priests, all embedded with deep meanings, needed proper interpretation. This endeavour required extra knowledge and appropriate skills. Intent on acquiring these prerequisites to produce credible work, Dr Khuplam decided to turn to God for help. Following his ardent prayer that continued for precisely 7 years, 7 months and 7 days, God answered on 5 October 1986. On that day he also had a vision from God asking him to call out the sun shine upon the children of Manmasi in northeast India and northwest Burma, so that they may be revived both physically and spiritually. The Lord of Israel then revealed to Dr Khuplam the parchment containing the once-lost Manmasi script, known as Bulpizem. According to legend, around BC 214, King Shi Hwangti of China destroyed the parchment. In the next 7 months that followed God also revealed to Dr Khuplam the meanings of the various visions hitherto unexplained this was tuning point in his research career.

The details of Dr. Khuplam's visions and their interpretations are much too long to be included in this brief biography. To provide glimpse of his rather surreal experiences an example is cited here: On one silent night, while Dr Khuplam was deep in prayer, his concentration was disturbed by the sound of croaking frogs around his house. It was during the monsoon season and so the particular amphibians were about in plenty. Exasperated, he cursed the frogs, and immediately the sound started to fade, and then ceased completely. The next morning, lo and behold, there were dead frogs all around the house, of which the children collected two to three basketfuls. The neighbours were astonished at the sight of hundreds of frogs that had all died in one night.

Notwithstanding Dr Khuplam's visions and other remarkable experiences, his work is yet to gain due recognition. One reason for this, perhaps, is his personal faith, popularly known as Messianic, which incorporated aspects of both Judaism and Christianity. The faith of the Kuki community being mainly dominated by the Christian religion, Dr Khuplam's research appears to have been viewed with a degree of skepticism. Another probable reason for this attitude is the subject itself, which primarily concerns old traditions, folktales and customs that the present generation of Kuki, Chin and Mizo people are virtually unfamiliar with. To bridge this gap, besides presentations at seminars, Dr Khuplam regularly spends hours explaining to his audience the work he has been doing. These sessions normally take place in the mornings at his residence. Scholars who subscribe to other versions of Kuki, Chin, Mizo genealogy and origin also contradict Dr Khuplam's work. In the absence of contemporaneous written historical records on these subjects, diverse genealogical trees and opinion inevitably exist. However, Dr Khuplam's visions and their interpretations that are linked to authentic materials (such as in the case of the stone tablet on which Bulpizem is inscribed) and supported by the coherent arguments he puts forward, renders his conclusions most credible.

It is also a fact that among the Kuki, Chin and Mizo people there is none yet to match Dr Khuplam's methodical and comparatively detailed input on the subject of the people's origins and their future. His contribution is exceptionally singular.

A more positive perspective began to develop among the critiques of Dr Khuplam's work after his meeting with Hillel Halkin in 1999. Hillel Halkin (a well-known author and journalist, and for many years the Israel correspondent for the New York Forward) endorsed Dr Khuplam's research largely based on the meticulous notes and entries in diaries that he kept, dating back to 1949, 1960–1965 and 1970–1972. Dr Khuplam had recorded the materials as was narrated by the older people of his generation. These elders were well acquainted with the traditions and customs, history, stories, mythologies, folktales and folklores, words and hymns chanted by priests and their meanings, which are identical among the Kuki, Chin and Mizo people. Knowledge of these treasures of the past is already beginning to fade among the present generation; they are only aware they exist, and nothing more. For the sake of posterity, Dr Khuplam's collected works' was put down in writing since 1967 with the aid of the National Research Office, at Phaibung village.

God has used Dr Khuplam to reconstruct the once-lost Manmasi identity of the Kuki-Chin-Mizo people. In this connection, he has written a total of twenty-five books on their origin, genealogy and culture. In Across the Sabbath River (2000, Houghton Mifflin, New York), Hillel Halkin devoted the entire chapter 9 to introduce Dr Khuplam; the remaining chapters 10-12 also concern him. In the New York Times (18 September 2002), Hillel Halkin wrote, "Dr Khuplam was an extraordinary figure who had carried out extraordinary ethnographic research." On 21 November 1999, Hillel Halkin presented Dr. Khuplam a scroll of confirmation that states the Kuki, Chin and Mizo people are descendants of Manmasi, one of the twelve tribes of Israel. This occasion coincided with the fiftieth year of Dr. Khuplam's painstaking work. Unfortunately, owing to pecuniary shortages, he was unable to celebrate the Golden Jubilee as would have been appropriate.

In the year 2001, Lars Goran Svensson of Sweden and 'Sister Angel', his assistant, met with Dr Khuplam. Guided by the spirit of God they had come to Manipur for a third time to seek out the lost tribes of Israel in order to bring them back to the Promised Land. They asked Dr Khuplam many questions pertaining to the identity of Manmasi (Manashe) tribe of Israel. Inspired and convinced by the responses that were based essentially on the age-old customs and traditions of the people, Lars has continued to support Dr Khuplam in his ongoing work up to here only.

== Publications ==
As a researchers on the origins, culture, and traditions of the Manmasi tribes, Dr. Khuplam has the following works to his credit:

1. In 1979 Dr. Khuplam published Home Medical Aid Book in Thadou-Kuki language where 1000 copies were printed for the benefit of the Thadou-Kuki community.
2. In 2005, a book called "Manmasi Chate Thulhun Kidang Masa (The Wonderful Genealogical Tales of Manmasi (Kuki-Chin-Mizo)" was produced with 1000 copies at the first place. It was a major compilation books of

With the help of HTC and Lars Göran Svenson of Sweden, Dr. Khuplam published:

1. A booklet "Report on Manmasi Identity Book" was published in Thadou Kuki and the same was translated into English and 1000 copies printed so far.
2. 2nd Edition of a brief History of the Kuki and meitei book 500 copies was published.
3. In 2002, Hillel Halkin introduced Dr. Khuplam in his book "Across the Sabbath River: In Search of a Lost Tribe of Israel." New York: Houghton Mifflin Harcourt. ISBN 978-0-618-02998-3
4. Dr. Khuplam visited Israel under the sponsorship of Lars of Sweden and Hillel Halkin's arrangement. He met several intellectuals in Jerusalem. Ha'Aretz magazine interviewed him besides Hillel Halkin and Rab. Shlomo Gangte Video interviewed him in Bet'el and Jerusalem. He also met Michael Freund, Founder, Shavei Israel in Jerusalem. Dr. Khuplam took different types of soil from the northeast, India and Myanmar and presented to Hillel and Michael Freund, Founder Chairman, Shavei Israel to signify that we are coming back home. He gave a memorandum to the Prime Minister of Israel.
5. His book "The Wonderful genealogical Tales of Manmasi" (50 years of Dr. Khuplam's research on the lost tribes of Israel) in English version. Maxford Books Publications, New Delhi ISBN 978 81 8116 152-9.

Dr. Khuplam and his works have been highlighted in books/magazines/newspapers/internet:

1. Mr. Th. Khamneithang Vaiphei, 25 March 1995 issue of North East Sun monthly Magazine.
2. Mr. Jamkhogin Lhungdim, 1997 September North East Panorama Magazine
3. Mr. Richard Bernstein, 2002 September "A Quest for a People Who May No Longer Exist" - The New York Times
4. Mr. Yair Sheleg, 2002 September "Menashe in Myanmar" - Ha' aretz
5. Mr. Caryl Phillips, 23 September 2002 "The Disappeared"
6. Mr. Amir Mizroch, The Jerusalem Post "An ever-expanding pool of would-be immigrants"
7. Mr. Yair Sheleg, Haaretz on 10 April 2008 "I worried customs would disappear"
8. Mr. Ribek, 7 December 2008 Manas Epic "Samaria, Samarkand, Samakai"
9. Mr. SamShnider, on 30 July 2009 "Red Sea songs"
10. Mr. Letkhosei Haokip, Kuki International Forum 2009 "Historical Chronology of Kuki people from B.C 700-1919 A.D"
11. Mr. HK Tongminlen, 7 March 2010, Indo-Judaica Home "Muslim Kings in Hindu Cosmogony: Discovering the Biblical Exodus Route and other Traces of the Judaic Tradition in the Medieval Manipuri Literature"
12. Mr. George T. Haokip, on 2012 "Problems of Hill Areas in North-East India" Maxford Books Publication, chapter 12, p-215
13. Ms. Mitchell A. Levin, 18 September 2012, CJN "This Day, September 18, In Jewish History by Mitchell A. Levin"
14. Mr. Eric Gundz, Interview with the Jewish Agency - YouTube
15. The Jewish Week "Found: A Lost Tribe"
16. Mr. Birgitta Kigongo, Kingdom Library "Israel-Manasse"
