= Moko Koza =

Indian rapper

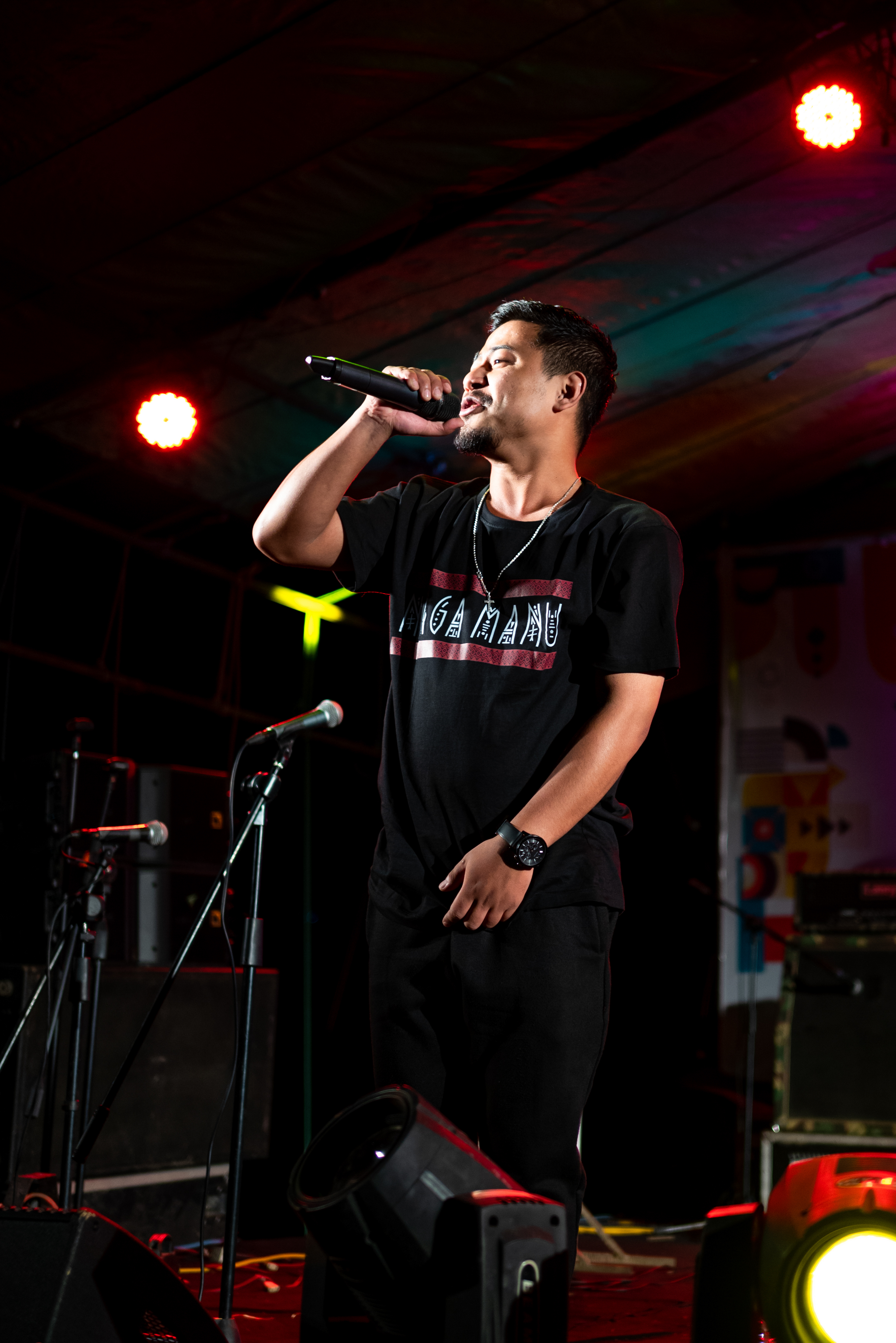
- Koza performing in Ukhrul, 2022
- Born: Mvüko Koza; 15 June 1996 (age 30); Kohima, Nagaland, India
- Education: Ministers' Hill Baptist Higher Secondary School
- Alma mater: Kohima Science College (Anthropology)
- Occupations: Rapper; songwriter
- Years active: 2013–present
- Musical career
- Origin: Kohima
- Genres: Rap; hip hop; folk; pop
- Label: Infinity Inc.

Mvüko Koza (born 15 June 1996), known professionally as Moko Koza, is an Indian rapper and songwriter from Nagaland. He is recognised as one of the first rappers to introduce multi-lingual and folk-fusion rap in Nagaland.

== Early life ==
Mvüko Koza was born on 15 June 1996 in Kohima, Nagaland to a Chakhesang Naga family with roots from Khezhakeno. He is the second son among four brothers and has two younger sisters. He did his early education in Shalom School from 2000 to 2001 and later attended Ministers' Hill Baptist Higher Secondary School in Kohima from 2002 to 2011. Koza completed his master's degree in Anthropology from Kohima Science College, Jotsoma in 2019.

He has been involved in rap since 2005 when he first obtained the CD of Eminem's film 8 Mile (2002) during a visit to a CD store with his father.

== Career ==
Koza released his debut single "Just My Imagination" in 2013, followed by several other singles and collaborations, including "Internationally Known" and "Happy Today."

In 2017, Koza released "One Day" (Khunhie Puo), a multi-lingual song where he rapped in both English and his local dialect, Tenyidie. The song went viral and received positive feedback from listeners. He later released his first Nagamese rap song, "Puisa," in 2018, which also garnered a positive response. In 2019, Koza signed with Infinity Inc., a record label based in Dimapur.

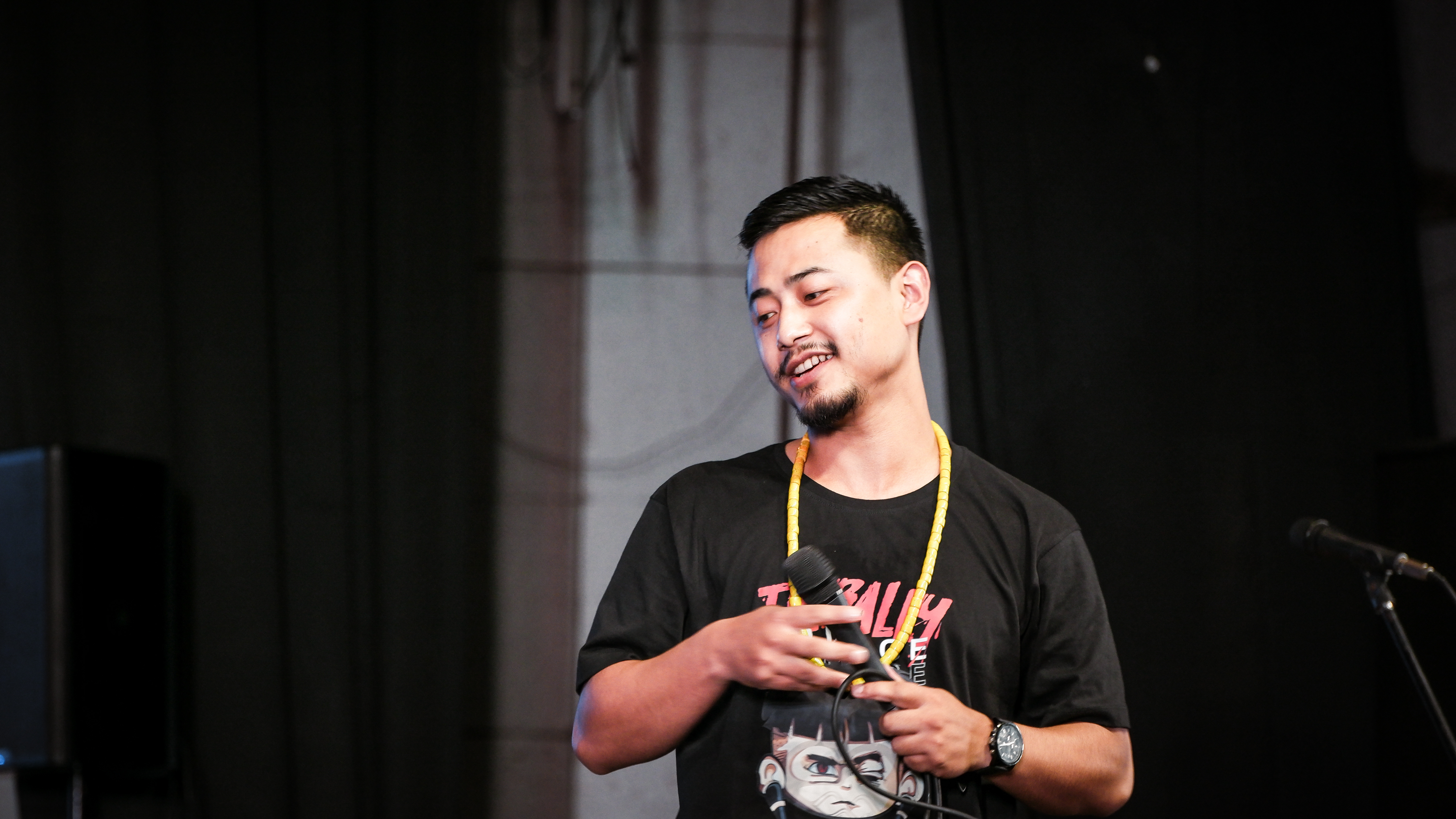
Koza performing for Naga Students' Union, Delhi in May 2022

In September 2022, Koza released his debut album titled "Naga Manu".

In 2025, Koza's music was featured in the third season of the Indian web series The Family Man, an espionage thriller created by Raj & DK and released on Amazon Prime Video.

== Personal life ==
Koza was raised in a Christian family.

== Discography ==
=== Studio albums ===
- Naga Manu (2022)

=== Television ===
Year	Film	Notes	Ref.
2025	Paatal Lok season 2	Web series	
2025	The Family Man season 3	Web series	

== Awards and nominations ==
Year	Award	Category	Song	Result	Ref.
2018	Music Awards of Nagaland	Best Hip-Hop/Rap	"Heal"	Won	
2019	Music Awards of Nagaland	Best Hip-Hop/Rap	"Happy Today"	Won	
2023	Radio City Freedom Award	Best Hip-Hop/Rap	"Naga Manu"	Won	

=== Other awards ===
Year	Award	Ref.
2023	TaFMA Excellence Award	
2025	Governor's Award for Excellence in Music	
