= Music Awards of Nagaland =

Annual Nagaland music awards

- Awarded for: Excellence in music
- Country: India
- Presented by: Native Trax Society
- First award: 2009

The Music Awards of Nagaland is a music awards show in India presented by the Native Trax Society. The annual ceremony was first held in 2009.

== Ceremonies ==
Edition	Year	Song of the Year	Note	Ref.
14th	2022	"Breathe" – Benry Moses		
13th	2021	"Gimme Gimme" – About Us		
12th	2020	"Nimok Power" – ZT Slingshot		
11th	2019	"Wait For Me" – Macnivil		
10th	2018			
9th	2017	"It" – Tutu Terhüja		
8th	2016	"Down That Road" – Virie and Zaza		
7th	2015			
6th	2014	"Dream From Inside" – Red Alert		
5th	2013			
4th	2012	"Prayer" – Rongsen Longchari		
3rd	2011	"A Kecha" – Diethozo Thakro		
2nd	2010			
1st	2009	"Oh..he..he..ho" – Aloino Sütsa		

== Categories ==
- Best EDM Song
- Best Gospel Song
- Best Gospel Song (Local Dialect)
- Best Lyricist/Songwriter
- Best Music Video
- Best Pop Song (Solo)
- Best Pop Song (Duo/Group)
- Best Pop Song (Local Dialects)
- Best Producer
- Best Rap/Hip Hop Song
- Best Rap/Hip Hop Song (Hindi/Local Dialects)
- Best Rock Song (Alt/Indie)
- Best Rock Song (Metal/Heavy)
- Best Sound Engineer
- Best Upcoming Artiste/Band
- Best Video Director
- Lifetime Achievement Awards
- Song of the Year
