= Longri Ao =

Longri Ao (1906–1981), also known by name Longritangchetha, was an indigenous Baptist missionary from the North-Eastern state of India, Nagaland. He was a missionary to the Konyak people and a peacemaker. He is known to have risked his life to restore peace in Nagaland, and to negotiate a ceasefire agreement between the Government of India and underground leaders fighting for Nagaland secession from India.

He is best remembered for his contributions to the peace movement in Nagaland as a church leader, for his role in establishing the controversial Peace Mission, later renamed Nagaland Peace Council (NPC), for which he was the president until death and most importantly for bringing a temporary stop to conflicts through Shillong Accord of 1975- by making naga insurgents to accept the Constitution of India. He was the founder of Naga-Gospel outreach mission, and was honoured with the title of Man of Peace by Government of Nagaland.

== Early life ==
Longri was born in Changki village, Nagaland, India, and was educated in theology. He was married to Subokyimia, daughter of Baptist pastor Subongwati, in 1932, and they had three sons and three daughters.

== Evangelism ==
He graduated from Eastern Theological College in Jorhat, Assam, and taught at the same college for 16 years. He along with Subongwati, his father-in-law, formed the Tamlu Baptist church in 1933. He was appointed in 1950 as a missionary to evangelize the Konyak Naga people by the Council of Baptist Churches in Northeast India (CBCNEI). In July 1960, he visited United States to study advanced theology sponsored by the American Baptist Foreign Mission Societies (ABFMS) at Baptist Divinity School, Berkeley, California. From 1967, he served as an executive secretary of the Nagaland Baptist Church Council (NBCC), and was leader of the newly founded Nagaland Missionary Movement (NMM) from 1979.

== Role in restoring peace in Nagaland ==
Longri, as a Church leader, with full cooperation from CBCNEI, NBCC, and ABFMS made sincere efforts in mediating between rebels and the government to carve out a ceasefire agreement, to make them come to the negotiation table for peace talks, and to reconcile to the authorities of the Constitution of India.

=== Ceasefire agreement ===
With already ten years of violence and destruction in an internal war between guerrillas and the government and an escalation during the 1964 Nagaland General Elections, Baptist Church under the leadership and guidance of Longri Ao and Kenneth Kerhuo, intervened for peace and held its third convention at Wokha from 31 January 1964 to 2 February 1964. During the three-day convention, more than five thousand Nagas, who referred to Longri Ao as the Naga Prophet "crying in wilderness for peace"[sic], attended the convention. The convention made a resolution for proposed "Peace talk", and to requested the government to provide services of Jayaprakash Narayan, National leader; Bimala Prasad Chaliha, Chief Minister of Assam; and Michael Scott, an Anglican churchman, for exploring ways for speedy restoration of peace in Nagaland. Speaking at the convention, Longri said:

Our paths are now stained with the blood of the innocent people. We do not know the way of peace. There is no fear of God in our heart...there seems no one who understands God and his righteous ways...The Nagas have been most unfaithful to a faithful God. They will, therefore, not go unpunished....

Based on the passed resolution, the Wokha convention appointed a special committee headed by Longri Ao and Kenneth Kerhuo to mediate between rebels and the government. They urged Jayaprakash Narayan, Bimala Prasad Chaliha, and Michael Scott to end the shooting in the hills. The relentless efforts of Peace Mission backed by Church leaders like Longri Ao and participation from both government and the rebel leaders, had resulted in a Ceasefire agreement signed by Vishnu Sahey, Governor of Nagaland on behalf of the Government of India, while Zashei Huire, Biseto Medom, and L. Zhenito signed on behalf of the underground government. Although, the Ceasefire was officially declared on 6 September 1964, it was signed on 23 May 1964.

The declaration of Ceasefire agreement enabled series of peace talks, eventually leading to six-rounds of talks in Delhi from 1966 to 1967 between Indira Gandhi, then Prime Minister of India, and the underground leaders.

=== Peace talks ===
Though there were several rounds of talks starting from February 1966 between underground leaders led by Kughato Sukhai, Prime Minister of underground government, and Indira Gandhi, with final round of talks on 3 October 1967 held in New Delhi, yet it failed to reach a positive agreement.

The failure to reach settlement with peace talks were followed by charges and countercharges by both Indian government and the insurgents leading to the breach of the terms of agreements; consequently, violence escalated to the extent of murder of a prominent underground leader "Kaito" on 3 August 1968. The insurgents retaliated back. In April 1971, State government authorities communicated in writing to Longri Ao that "to enable underground and overground leaders to have a free contact and parley for restoration of peace in Nagaland there will be no operations in search of arms/searching villages/arrests etc. for 15 days with effect from April 22, 1971 to May 6, 1971 in and around Kohima town and other areas like Dihoma, Phesama, Chedema, Meriema and Chiechama". On 8 August 1972, an ambush was laid to murder Hokishe Sema, Chief Minister of Nagaland, however, he escaped without major injuries. Government of India on 31 August 1972 banned (also called September ban) three underground groups - Naga National Council, Federal Government of Nagaland, and also the Naga Federal Army using "Unlawful Activities Act 1967." Government of India also stopped the extension of Ceasefire agreement.

With cessation of the ceasefire agreement, including almost dissolution of Peace Mission by 1972, Longri Ao and other church leaders formed Nagaland Peace Council (NPC) in 1974 with Longri Ao as its president till his death, and initiated the discussions and talks once again. The steps for peace talks initiated this time reached its climax with the promulgation of Indira Gandhi's Emergency in 1975, as Shillong Accord of 1975.

=== Shillong Accord of 1975 ===
With the imposition of Indira Gandhi's National Emergency in India after the President's rule in Nagaland by May 1975 that gave free hand to security forces to deal with the rebels, insurgents, political opponents, and alike, a spate of surrenders, including unquestionable violence took place in Nagaland. The church leaders took steps to broker a peace between underground leaders and Government of India to restore peace and as a result, a liaison committee under NPC was formed. Longri being the president of NPC, took initiative playing major role to mediate between Government of India and underground leaders like Kevi Yalie, brother of Angami Zapu Phizo, to resolve the Naga issue forever. Longri was a member of the liaison Committee that also included prominent leaders like Kenneth Kerhuo, L. Lungalang, M. Aram, Neiliezhü Üsou and Lungshim Shaiza that held discussions with underground leaders; consequently, underground leaders decided to send six representatives with full authority to negotiate with the representatives of the government for establishing peace in Nagaland.

Under his leadership, NPC was largely responsible for bringing an end to the major hostilities through the Shillong Accord of 1975 during President's rule in Nagaland. He held discussions with the underground leaders who were by then brought to the Chedema peace camp under "safe conduct arrangements."

Since both the parties were desperate and determined to bring an end to the conflict and bring some sort of solution, a three-point agreement was concluded, to be known as Shillong Accord - to surrender the arms [deposit at places to be settled later], accept the supremacy of the Constitution of India, and formulate other issues for final agreement. Shillong Accord was finally accepted on 5 December 1975, apparently opening a new political history in Nagaland bringing peace.

Shillong Accord of 1975, however, was bluntly rejected by Isak Swu and Muivah, who were demanding not less than unquestionable sovereignty; thus, National Socialist Council of Nagaland(NSCN) was formed by Isak Swu and Muivah to fight for their sovereignty demand. Longri also took steps to initiate dialogues with NSCN and government. He died on 6 August 1981.

== Awards ==
- Man of Peace from Nagaland government on 7 August 1981.
