= Salhoutuonuo Kruse =

Naga Indian politician

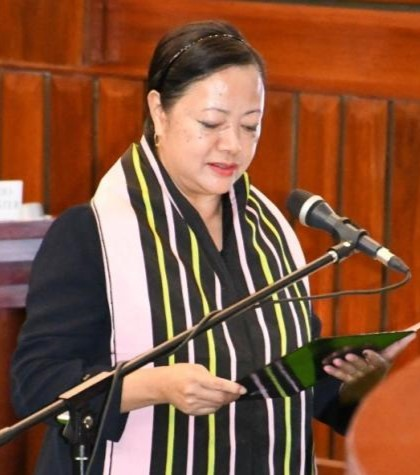
- Salhoutuonuo Kruse in 2023

Cabinet Minister, Government of Nagaland
- Incumbent
- Assumed office 7 March 2023
- Governor: La. Ganesan
- Cabinet: Fifth Rio ministry
- Chief Minister: Neiphiu Rio
- Ministry and Departments: Women Resource Development; Horticulture

Member of Nagaland Legislative Assembly
- Incumbent
- Assumed office March 2023
- Preceded by: Keneizhakho Nakhro
- Constituency: Western Angami

Personal details
- Born: Salhoutuonuo Kruneilie; 15 December 1966 (age 59) Kiruphema, Kohima District, Nagaland, India
- Party: Naga People's Front
- Spouse: Kevisekho Kruse (m. 1986; died 2021)
- Children: 2
- Education: Ministers' Hill Baptist English School (now known as Ministers' Hill Baptist Higher Secondary School)
- Alma mater: Kohima College (BA)
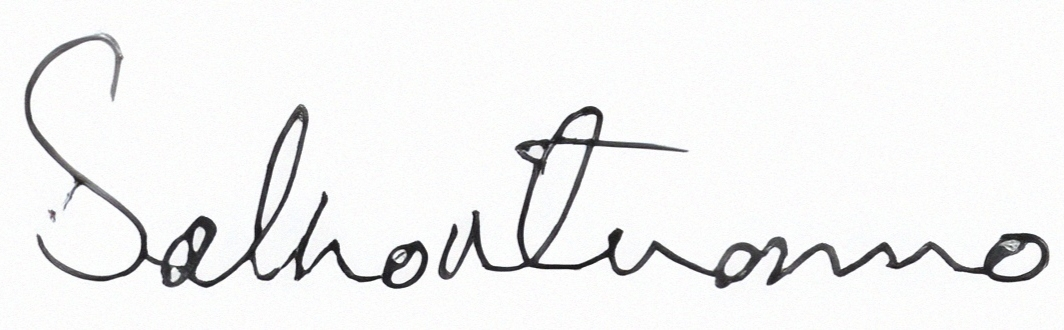
- Signature

Salhoutuonuo Kruse (née Kruneilie; born 15 December 1966) is an Indian politician from Nagaland. In 2023, along with Hekani Jakhalu Kense, Kruse became the first woman to be elected to the Nagaland Legislative Assembly. She was appointed the Minister for Women Resource Development & Horticulture in the 5th Rio ministry, making her also the first female cabinet minister in Nagaland. She previously served as the president of the Angami Women Organization.

== Early life ==
Salhoutuonuo Kruneilie was born 15 December 1966 to an Angami Naga family from Kiruphema. She studied at Ministers' Hill Baptist English School (now known as Ministers' Hill Baptist Higher Secondary School) in Kohima and later, completed her graduation from Kohima College. She married Kevisekho Kruse, an engineer on 2 October 1986. Kevisekho retired as a chief engineer of Nagaland's Public Health Engineering Department. He later joined politics.

== Career ==
Kruse served as the President of the Angamimiapfü Mechü Krotho (now known as Angami Women Organization) from 2011 to 2014. She is also an advisory board member of the Angami Public Organization, which is the male-dominated apex tribal body for the Angami Naga.

== Political life ==
Kruse's husband, Kevisekho Kruse, joined the Nationalist Democratic Progressive Party (NDPP) in 2018 and fought the Nagaland Legislative Assembly election that year from the Western Angami Assembly seat as the party candidate. He lost to the Naga People's Front (NPF) candidate Keneizhakho Nakhro by 694 votes. Later, Nakhro joined the NDPP in 2022.

In the subsequent state elections, Salhoutuonuo Kruse was given the NDPP party ticket over sitting MLA Nakhro for the Western Angami seat. The latter then fought the election as an independent candidate. By standing for elections, Kruse said that she wanted to fulfil her husband's political vision.

At the time of filing her nominations, Kruse was one of the 104 crorepati (₹10 million rupees) candidates in the fray. With declared assets of over ₹129 million, she was in the top ten richest candidates standing for the state elections. The elections for the 14th Nagaland State Legislative Assembly was held on 27 February 2023. It was largely peaceful, albeit with a few pre- and post-poll incidents. However, it was marked with several allegations of proxy voting and other irregularities. The election results were announced on 2 March 2023. Kruse won the elections for the Western Angami seat by a margin of seven votes. She polled 7078 votes, while her nearest rival and sitting MLA Nakhro received 7071 votes. By winning the seat, Kruse became the first elected woman to the Nagaland Legislative Assembly along with Hekani Jakhalu. Kruse later attributed her electoral victory by an extremely small margin to "God's providence."

=== First term ===
During her first term as the Member of the Legislative Assembly, Kruse was appointed the Minister for Women Resource Development & Horticulture in the 5th Rio ministry. She became the first female cabinet minister in Nagaland.

During her leadership, the state horticulture department, under the Mission for Integrated Development of Horticulture launched the 'Horticulture Model Village' (HMV) programme in Nagaland. One village in each of the state's districts was identified with an emphasis on increasing horticulture crops. In September 2023, Kruse declared Khonoma village the first HMV. During the fourth Organic Orange Festival of Rüsoma village, Kruse announced the inclusion of the village under HMV 2025. In 2024, the village had over 14.000 fruit-bearing orange trees and over 28.000 saplings planted. She suggested improving intercultural practices and indigenous wisdom and integrating modern horticultural techniques and development. She promised farmers market linkages for sale. On 10 September 2024, Kruse announced the plan to set up an apple processing unit at Thanamir village which produces 40-50 tons of apple every year. The fruit is available from July to December every year. She also encouraged villagers to cultivate other suitable crops with the assurance that the state's horticulture department would provide assistance in market linkages, technical knowledge, and other support.

== Personal life ==
Kruse is a Baptist Christian and she attends Ministers' Hill Baptist Church in Kohima.

She was married to Kevisekho Kruse. They married on 2 October 1986 and had two daughters together. He later died from complications of COVID-19 during the COVID-19 pandemic in Nagaland on 4 June 2021 at age 60.
