= Zale Neikha =

Indian politician

Member of Nagaland Legislative Assembly
- In office 13 March 2018 – 2 March 2023
- Preceded by: Kropol Vitsü
- Succeeded by: Kropol Vitsü
- Constituency: Southern Angami II

Personal details
- Born: Zale Neikha Viswema, Nagaland, India
- Party: Nationalist Congress Party
- Children: 4
- Education: National Institute of Technology, Raipur

Zale Neikha is an Indian politician from Nagaland. He was elected to the Nagaland Legislative Assembly in 2018 from Southern Angami II Assembly constituency as a candidate of the Naga People's Front. He was appointed the chief minister's Advisor for Youth Resources and Sports (YRS) in Fourth Neiphiu Rio ministry.

Zale graduated from National Institute of Technology, Raipur.
