= Kanrei Shaiza =

Indian writer

Kanrei Shaiza was an Indian writer who worked as the Assistant Interpreter (of the English Language) of 22nd Manipur Labour Corp Company during the First World War. He has detailed this voyage to France (1917–1918), and the ongoing War pandemonium in Āpuk Āpaga Rairei Khare, France Khavā, 1917-18, Khala Republic Day, 1974, Delhi Kakā (1971). Shaiza is also the author of Ningshātwon (1974); Hunphun Thotrinchān (1967); and Ringphatyan (1970).
