= Kohima Science College =

College in Nagaland, India

- Coat Of Arms
- Other name: KSCJ
- Motto: Omnia Vincit Labor (Latin)
- Motto in English: Labour Overcomes Everything
- Established: 1961; 65 years ago
- Affiliations: Autonomous
- Principal: Lily Sema
- Students: 2000 (as of 2021)
- Location: Jotsoma, Kohima District, Nagaland, 797002, India; 25.6659°N 94.0751°E
- Campus: Urban
- Website: kscj.ac.in

The Kohima Science College, Jotsoma (KSCJ) is an autonomous government institute for undergraduate and postgraduate science education located at Jotsoma in the state of Nagaland, India. The college was established in 1961 with science education at higher secondary and under graduate levels.

Kohima Science College has about 2000 students (as of 2021) enrolled in collegiate undergraduate and graduate programs and served by about 100 faculty and staff with a teacher to student ratio of 1:20.

== Campus ==
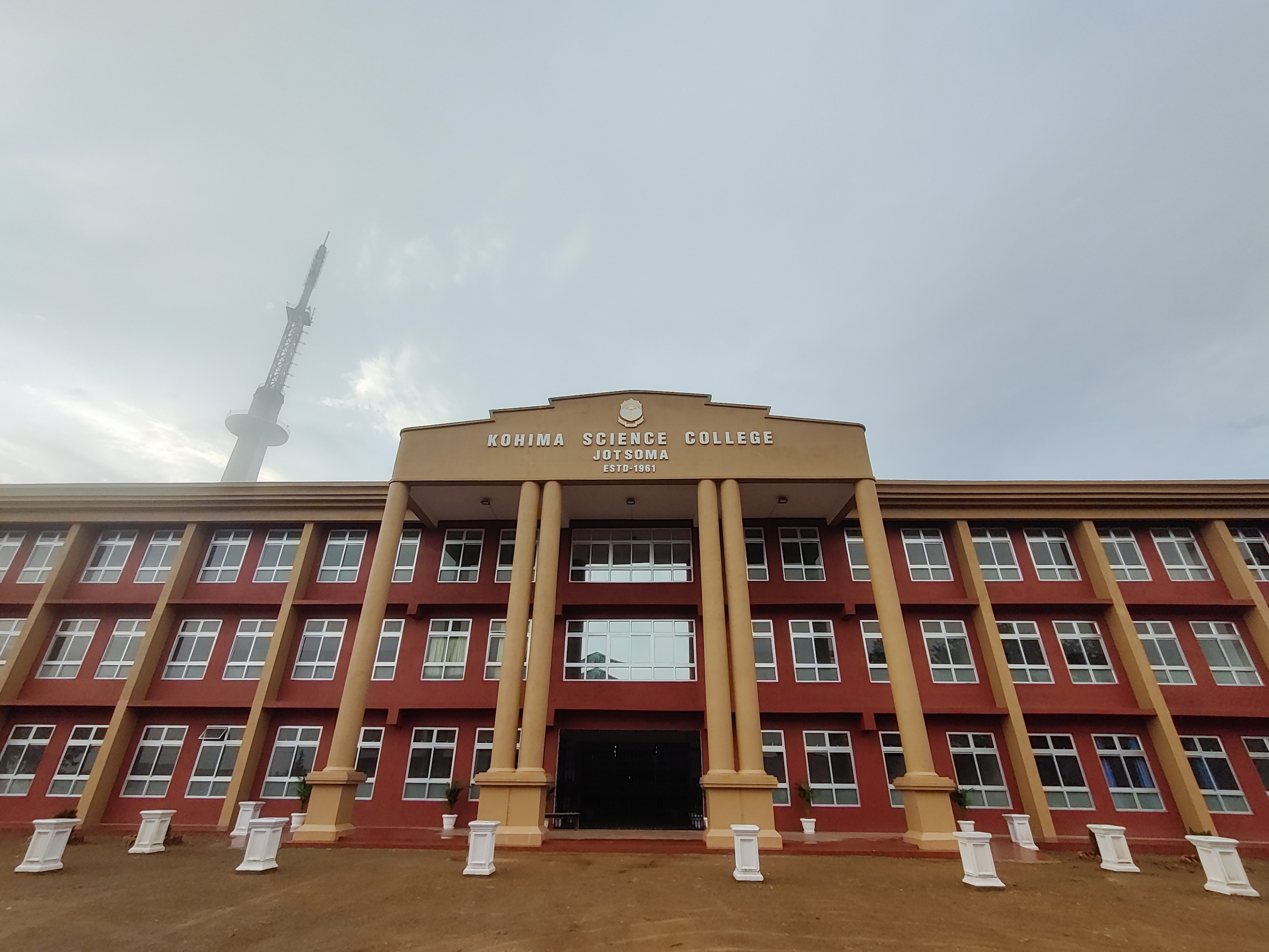
The Red Square

The college campus is located on the hill top of Jotsoma village, which is located four kilometres (2.5 mi) from Kohima. The college campus covers an area of about 50 acres (20 ha).

The institution is built on a hillock, originally measuring 200 acres (81 ha). Presently, three portions, about 50 acres altogether, have been carved out to house a water reservoir, Doordharshan Kendra Kohima and music academy.

== Departments ==
- Department of Anthropology
- Department of Botany
- Department of Chemistry
- Department of Computer Science
- Department of Economics
- Department of English
- Department of Geography
- Department of Geology
- Department of Mathematics
- Department of Physics
- Department of Statistics
- Department of Tenyidie
- Department of Zoology

== Administration ==
Principal: Dr. Temjenwabang

Vice Principal: Ms. Kevilhuninuo Nagi

Founding members:

- Neilhouzhü Kire, Chairman
- John Bosco Jasokie, General Secretary
- Keduonyü Sekhose, Organizing Secretary
- Vizol Koso, Member
- Haizotuo Munshi, Member
- U.M. Deb, Treasurer
- Akum Imlong, Member

== Library ==
The college is endowed with a number of libraries to meet the informative needs of the students and faculty. It has a large repository of books, journals, national and international magazines, newspapers, past exam question papers and project reports.

The college is a registered user of UGC-NLIST (National Library and Information Services Infrastructure for Scholarly Content) Programme, a project funded by the Ministry of Human Resources Development under its National Mission on Education through ICT. The N-LIST project provides access to more than 3800 journals, 80000 electronic books and bibliographic databases to students, researchers and faculty, and also allows authorized users to download articles directly from the publisher's website.

== Notable alumni and faculty ==
- Neikezhakuo Kengurüse, Indian Army Officer
- Mmhonlümo Kikon, Politician
- Moko Koza, Rapper
- Vizadel Sakhrie, Politician
- Hovithal Sothu, Bureaucrat

=== Faculty members ===
- Tanka Bahadur Rai, Politician
