= Viswesül Pusa =

Indian politician

Member of the Nagaland Legislative Assembly
- In office 15 February 1993 – 10 March 2013
- Preceded by: Vizadel Sakhrie
- Succeeded by: Kropol Vitsü
- Constituency: Southern Angami II

President of Nagaland Pradesh Congress Committee
- In office 2008 – 2009

Personal details
- Born: Viswesül Kezehol Pusa; 3 November 1954 Viswema, Assam, India (now in Nagaland, India)
- Died: 2 January 2017 (aged 62) Kohima, Nagaland, India
- Party: Indian National Congress
- Children: 3
- Education: North Eastern Hill University (B.A.)
- Nickname: K. V. Pusa

Viswesül Kezehol Pusa (3 November 1954 – 2 January 2017) was an Indian politician from Nagaland. He was elected to the Nagaland Legislative Assembly four times from the Southern Angami II Assembly constituency as a candidate of the Indian National Congress. He served as the Minister for Veterinary & Animal Husbandry from 1998 to 1999 and Minister for Roads & Bridges and Mechanical from 2000 to 2003 under the S. C. Jamir government.
