= Vizadel Sakhrie =

Indian politician

Member of Nagaland Legislative Assembly
- In office 10 November 1982 – 15 February 1993
- Preceded by: Vizol Koso
- Succeeded by: Viswesül Pusa
- Constituency: Southern Angami II

Personal details
- Born: Vizadel Sakhrie Hibo; 25 April 1943 Viswema, Assam Province, British India (now in Nagaland, India)
- Died: 31 March 1995 (aged 51) Kohima, Nagaland, India
- Resting place: Hope Garden, Viswema
- Party: Indian National Congress
- Children: 3 daughters and 7 sons

Vizadel Sakhrie Hibo (25 April 1943 – 31 March 1995) was an Indian politician and medical specialist from Nagaland. He was first elected to the Nagaland Legislative Assembly from Southern Angami II Assembly constituency in 1982 as an independent candidate. Sakhrie then joined the Indian National Congress after which he served as the Minister for Medical and Health & Family Welfare.

== Early life and education ==
Vizadel Sakhrie was born on 25 April 1943 to Puhokhwel Sakhrie and his wife Vichosale. He passed matriculation from Kohima Government High School in 1960 and went on to study science at Kohima Science College, where he was among the school's first batch of 21 students to pass the pre-university class in 1961. During this time, Sakhrie also actively involved himself in student activities and served as the first President of Viswema Students' Union from 1963 to 1965. He completed his pre-medical from Cotton College, Guwahati and got his M.B.B.S. degree from Gauhati Medical College and Hospital. He then obtained his M.D. in Medicine from Maulana Azad Medical College, New Delhi.

== Career ==
Sakhrie joined the Nagaland Medical Service and served for eight years as Assistant Surgeon, Grade I and Medical Specialist before becoming a private medical practitioner. Thereafter, he actively took part in State politics and was elected in the 1982 State Legislative Assembly elections as an independent candidate from the Southern Angami II constituency. He later joined the Indian National Congress and became a Minister for Medical and Health & Family Welfare from 1983 to 1986.

Following the killing of students Kekuojalie Sachü and Vikhozo Yhoshü by the indiscriminate firing of Nagaland State Police Forces on 20 March 1986, eight ministers including Sakhrie tendered their resignation to the Chief Minister.

He was subsequently re-elected twice during 1987 and 1989 from the same constituency, during which he served as the Minister for Forest, Ecology & Environment and Wildlife and then as Minister for Agriculture & Horticulture and Land Revenue respectively.

== Later life and death ==
Sakhrie failed to get re-elected to the Nagaland Legislative Assembly in the next General Elections but he continued to serve the public in his capacity as a Doctor. His own health began failing soon after and on 31 March 1995, he died at Naga Hospital, Kohima leaving behind his wife, seven sons and three daughters.
