= Tetseo Sisters =

Naga Indian sibling singing group

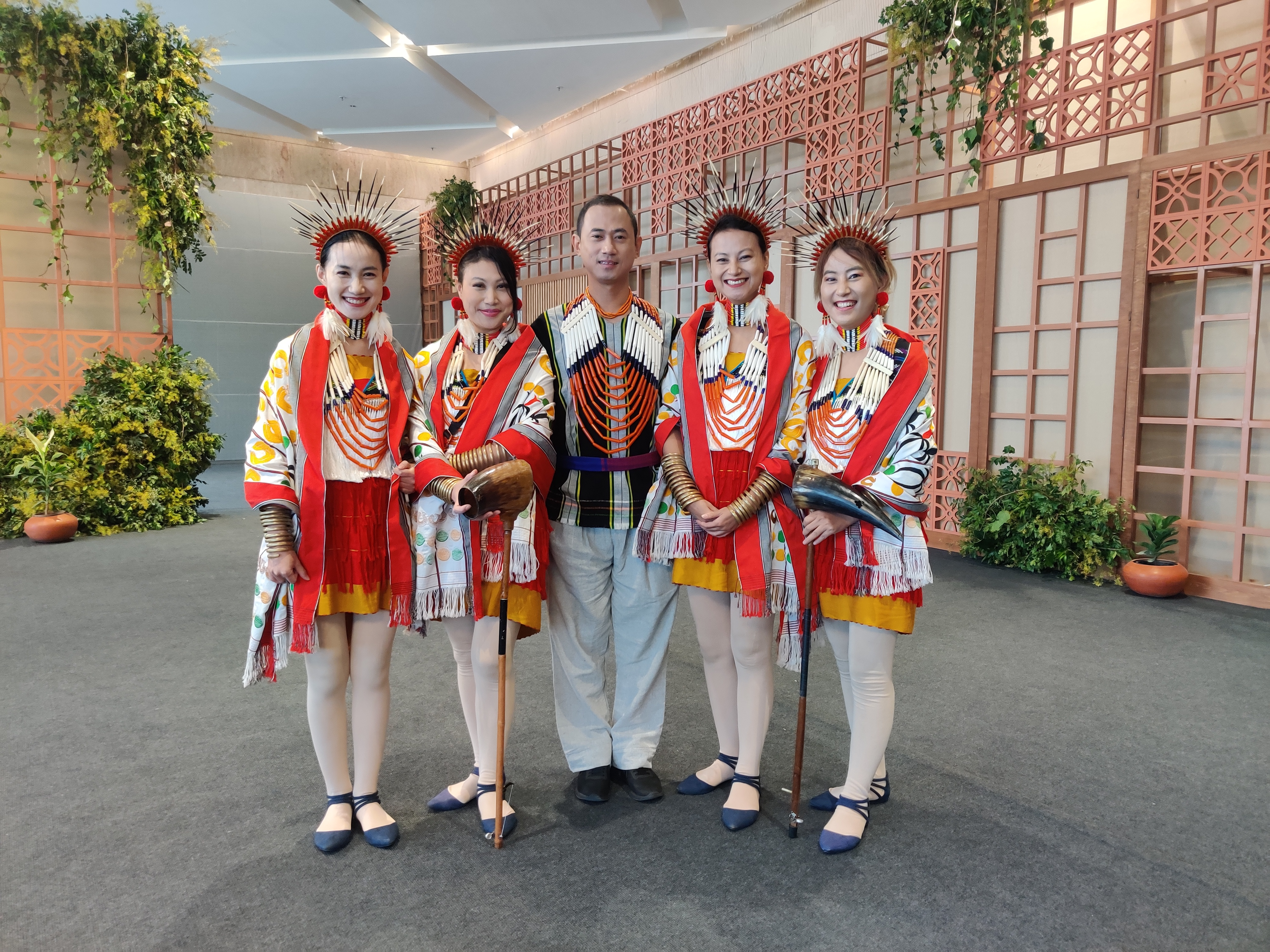
- Tetseo Sisters with their brother at the Google for India 2022 event, New Delhi

Background information
- Origin: Kohima, Nagaland, India
- Genres: Folk, World Music
- Years active: 1994–present
- Members: Mütsevelü Tetseo (Mercy); Azine Tetseo (Azi); Kuvelü Tetseo (Kuku); Alüne Tetseo (Lulu)
- Website: www.tetseosisters.com

Tetseo Sisters are a quartet of sisters from the Northeast Indian state of Nagaland. They are devoted to the art and tradition of the vocal folk music of the state and have been performing on stage since they were children.

== Early life ==
Tetseo Sisters—Mütsevelü (Mercy), Azine (Azi), Kuvelü (Kuku) and Alüne (Lulu)—grew up in Kohima, and belong to the Chakhesang Naga tribe, one of the major Naga ethnic groups. They sing in Chokri, one of the languages of Phek District. From early days, their parents acquainted the girls with Li, the traditional folk songs of their tribe.

== Career ==
They have been attributed to starting the folk fusion movement in the state. The sisters are regularly invited to show their art on the occasion of official promotions as Nagaland's cultural ambassadors/representatives both at home and abroad. Some notable appearances include, the North East Trade Opportunities Summit in Bangkok, Thailand in 2008 and the Handshake Concerts in Bangkok in 2012, Yangon, Myanmar in 2014, Kunming, Yunnan, PRC in November 2015, Gwangju, Korea in September 2016, Queen Baton's Rally for the Commonwealth Games 2010 at Touphema, Nagaland and the then Prince Andrew's visit to Kohima commemorating the Diamond Jubilee of Elizabeth II on 1 May 2012. In August 2014 Mercy and Kuvelü Tetseo were part of a 50 head strong Naga song-and-dance-troupe that performed at the 24 shows of the Royal Military Tattoo in Edinburgh and three additional events at other places in Scotland. In October 2014 Mercy, Kuvelü, Lulu and their brother Mhaseve belonged to the entourage of the Governor of Nagaland and Tripura P. B. Acharya on a visit to the United States. Concerts took place in Chicago, Bloomington (IL) and Detroit.

In 2013, Tetseo Sisters participated in the making of the video "My vote makes my future", with Alobo Naga and other artistes, sponsored by the Election Commission of India to promote voting for the Nagaland Assembly to younger voters. In 2014 they joined forces again with a lot of other artists from the region, notably Papon, Lou Majaw, Soulmate and Alobo Naga, when singing We are the 8! the hymn of Indian Super League-club NorthEast United FC.

2015 saw in addition to numerous performances at national festivals and venues, the release of several cover versions in different styles:

- Barso Re, a Bollywood-hit, written by A. R. Rahman for the film Guru, originally sung by Shreya Ghoshal
- Marvin Gaye, with Kenny Rio, originally by Charlie Puth and Meghan Trainor
- Nobody, with Rose Vero, the Korean Version of a song by K-Pop-girlgroup Wonder Girls
- Nothing On You by Bruno Mars, with David Sawang
- Silver Bells, Bing Crosby's Christmas carol, with Tuden Jamir

Tetseo Sisters recited the National Anthem at the opening ceremony of the Pro Kabbadi League Season 1 in Kolkata in July, 2015. 2015 ended on a high with winning the Best Folk/Fusion Act award at the first ever Indihut Music Awards 2015 handed out in December 2015.

In 2016, Tetseo Sisters participated at Sarang, the Festival of India in Korea and performed in the city of Gwanju at the Asian Culture Center, South Korea. Tetseo Sisters closed the annual Hornbill Festival of 2016 with a smashing performance.

January 2017 saw Tetseo Sisters tour several districts of Nepal as part of the ICCR/Indian Embassy Festival of India in Nepal. Tetseo Sisters were photographed by Mario Testino for Dove Real Beauty Campaign and featured in the May Edition of Vogue India. Later that year, Tetseo Sisters headlined the first International Edition of the Tata Samvaad 2017 in Jamshedpur, Jharkhand in November. Tetseo Sisters performed at the Opening Ceremony of the first edition of the Nagaland Olympics on 12 December 2017 at DDSC Stadium, Dimapur.

In early 2018, Tetseo Sisters gave their first Tedtalk at TedxIIMRanchi where they shared their story under the theme "Defiers of Murphy's Law" on 28 January. Tetseo Sisters performed live on Day 2 of the Lakme Fashion Week Mumbai Summer/Resort 2018 at the show titled NorthEastMojo celebrating textiles from the Northeast.

Tetseo Sisters went on a three city tour supported by Hard Rock Cafe India as Venue Partner in April 2018. They performed at HRC Delhi, Bangalore and Mumbai. Tetseo Sisters performed at the Mix the City IIT Guwahati and Delhi Editions as part of the British Council's 75 year anniversary celebrations. They also made their debut at Ragasthan, India's only luxury destination music festival held in the sands of Jaisalmer.

Tetseo Sisters were part of the World Environment Day Celebrations in Kohima on 5 June 2018 and lent their voices to a collaborative single - "Contemplation" by Band Powerfaith featuring various other top Naga artistes. In one of the first within the Naga music circle, Naga artists came together for a common environmental cause. The collaborating venture is part of a project called ‘Creation Care’ initiated by the Powerfaith Ministry, a ministry focusing on positively impacting the young through music.

In December 2019, Tetseo Sisters presented their music and storytelling art at the first ever Hornbill Festival Box Office Show from 1 to 10 December. The daily ticketed shows of 2pm and 6pm were well attended by visitors both domestic and foreign.

In the first half of 2020, Tetseo Sisters released 2 singles and kicked off a collaborative Ad Campaign with the Himalaya brand on a song celebrating Happy Hair Moments. The singles were "Road to Somewhere" - the sisters' first rap song in Chorki/English/Hindi and "Say Yes to Life" - a life-affirming anthem in English. Their Punjabi cover of popular film song Dil Diya Gallan which released on YouTube went viral on social media and was called a moment of National Integration through music.

Tetseo Sisters presented an hour-long Christmas Special on the eve of Christmas of 2020 and was well received.

In January 2021, Tetseo Sisters joined activists, celebrities and important personalities of the country to commemorate Network18's Mission Paani Waterthon and performed Live on National Television. They debuted a single "Paani Lizo" a tri-lingual song about the importance of saving water.

== Discography ==
In 2011, Tetseo sisters released their debut album titled "Li Chapter One: The Beginning" at the Hornbill Festival.

In February 2015, they released a single Cepho Celho Lizo on the music platform indihut.com. Tetseo Sisters dropped the official video of a (yet to be released) version of their popular track single "O Rhosi (dance edit)" on their YouTube Channel in August 2018.

In November 2019 Tetseo Sisters officially released their EP, A Slice of Li, comprising seven tracks and three bonus instrumental tracks.

In July 2020, Tetseo Sisters released a single "Road to somewhere" - a pop/rap song in Chokri, Hindi and English.

In August 2020, Tetseo Sisters collaboration song with Himalaya Hair Care, "Happy Hair Moments" went live.

== Li ==
Li is the Chokri Naga word for folk songs or songs of the people.

The Chakhesangs have a huge repertoire of folk songs that have been compiled into a traditional songbook, Li kukre kutiko, that consists of 223 common songs. Most of the other songs have been handed down through oral tradition (much like any other Naga tribe) from generation to generation in the villages of the region. There are Li for special events, love songs, children's songs, laments, war songs and songs that are related to agriculture and its seasonal activities. The repetitive "Ho-he-ho"-"hiyo-hiyohey" choirs are shared between separate groups, either ad lib or echoing one another. These songs are sometimes accompanied by the one-stringed instrument tati or heka libuh (mithun horn) which they play.

== Personal life ==
Mercy Tetseo earned a university degree in Psychology from the University of Delhi and is an avid foodie, traveller and writer. Azi Vezivolü was a runner-up at Miss Nagaland and earned a university degree in Political Sciences from the University of Delhi. She does modelling, sings in other formations and is on a sabbatical from tours since her marriage to raise her two young sons. Kuku Tetseo studied at University of Delhi's Lady Shri Ram College for Women and is an active fashion blogger and social media influencer at 'My Salad Days' now rebranded as 'Naganess'. Lulu Tetseo is the youngest of the four sisters and is attending Indira Gandhi Government Medical College in Nagpur.

== Awards and honours ==
In 2012, they received the Trail Blazer Award at the 4th Nagaland Music Awards by Native Trax, along with Alobo Naga. In early 2014, they received the Eastern Panorama's Achievers Award for excellence in Music at Shillong.

In November 2014, they won the MTS Discover title at the NH7 music festival and played at the Festival's stage in Kolkata, Pune and Delhi.

In August 2018, Tetseo Sisters received the Governor's Award for Excellence in Music at a special function on the occasion of the Indian Independence Day at the Nagaland Raj Bhavan.
