= Li (folk song) =

Music tradition of the Chakesang tribe of India

Li are folk songs of the Chakesang tribe of Nagaland, India. Literally, Li means Folksong in the Chokri language spoken by the Chakhesang tribe of Nagaland. It often takes the place of conversation and is known to beautifully communicate feelings, ideas and engage people in a circle of warmth and friendship.

The Chakhesangs have a huge repertoire of folk songs that have been compiled into a traditional songbook, Li kukre kutiko, that consists of 223 common songs. Most of the other songs have been handed down through oral tradition (much like any other Naga tribe) from generation to generation in the villages of the region. There are Li for special events, love songs, children's songs, laments, war songs and songs that are related to agriculture and its seasonal activities. The repetitive "Ho-he-ho"-"hiyo-hiyohey" choirs are shared between separate groups, either ad lib or echoing one another. These songs are sometimes accompanied by the one-stringed instrument tati or heka libuh (mithun horn) which they play.
