= Jiangam Kamei =

Indian musician

Guru Jianngam Kamei (1963–2016) was a noted music director, lyricist, and singer from Manipur, India. He was conferred the title "Guru Shiksha Parampara Award" by Ministry of Art and Culture, Government of India for his contribution to the field of music in 2012.

== Biography ==
Jiangam Kamei was a Rongmei Naga belonging to the Zeliangrong Naga community. He was born on 9 February 1963 at Canchipur, Imphal. He started singing and writing songs as early as 1985 in both Ruanglat and Meiteilon. He was also an approved artiste of All India Radio, Imphal and had served as president of Zeliangrong Artists Forum, Manipur.
