= Hovithal Sothu =

Educationist

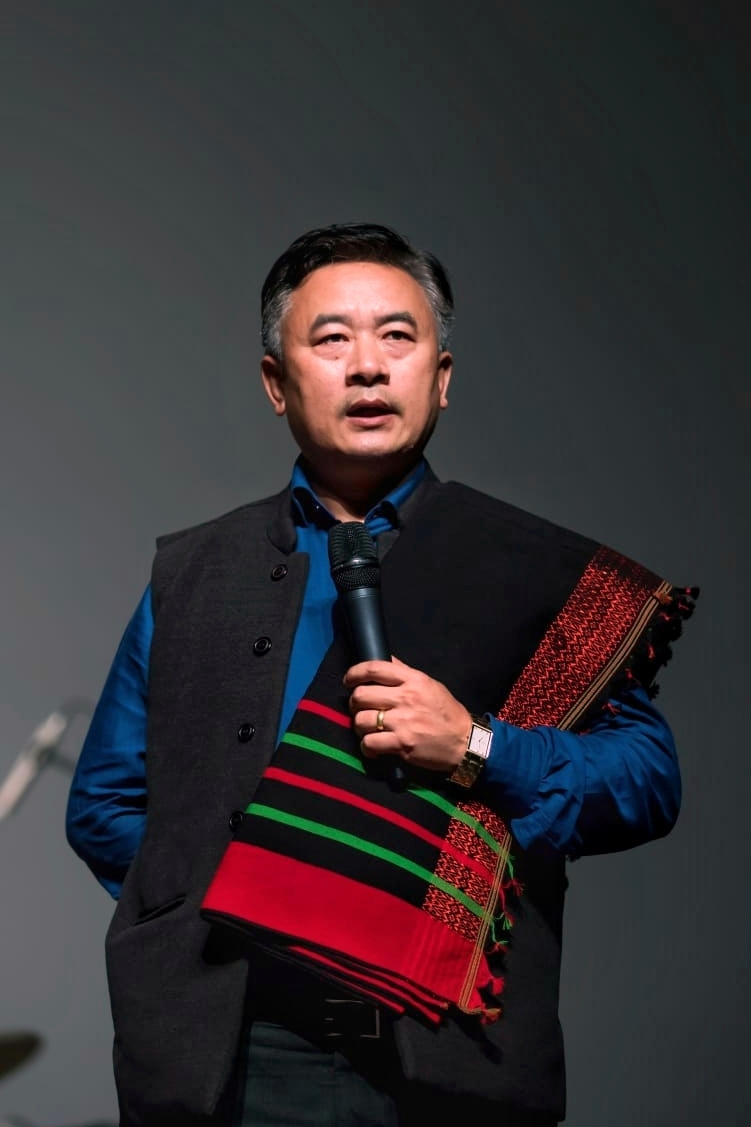
- Sothu speaking at the RCEMPA, 2019

Project Director of Task Force For Music & Arts, Government of Nagaland
- In office 30 November 2018 – 26 May 2026

Personal details
- Born: 9 August 1972 (age 53) Viswema, Kohima District, Nagaland
- Spouse: Neithono Sothu (m. 2003)
- Children: 3
- Education: Kohima Science College (B.Sc.)

Hovithal Sothu (born 9 August 1972), is an Indian Educationist from Nagaland. He served as the Project Director for Task Force For Music & Arts, Government of Nagaland from November 2018 till May 2026.

== Early life and education ==
Hovithal Sothu was born on 9 August 1972 in Viswema, Nagaland. He received his primary education from St. Joseph's School, Viswema and finished high school from Loyola School, Jakhama. Then, he went on to join the Kohima Science College to pursue his dreams of becoming a doctor where he completed his B.Sc.

== Career ==
He found his first employment opportunity in the PWD Department and started his career as a peon on fixed pay. He went on to complete his M.Sc, after which, he was selected as a lecturer at Kohima Science College, Jotsoma.

He taught at Kohima Science College for a few decades until he chanced upon a vacant post for an associate professor under Home Department in the Nagaland Disaster Management Cell.

In between, he also managed to earn his doctorate. Over the years, he has been closely monitoring trainings on Nagaland Services Rules, Disciplinary Rules, Human Rights, Consumer Rights, Elections (for which, he is also the State Master Trainer), basic office procedures, motivation, leadership, etc and also Issues on duties of citizens and Rights and Welfare with People with Disability. He has also published papers in the National Institute of Disaster Management (NIDM) and Indian Landslides Journal.

Later on he went on to become the State Coordinator of Disaster Management Cell at the Administrative Training Institute (ATI).

=== Task Force For Music & Arts ===
At present, he is serving as the Project Director for Task Force For Music & Arts, Government of Nagaland

== See also ==
- Task Force For Music & Arts
- Viswema
