= Neikezhakuo Kengurüse =

Indian army officer and Recipient of Maha Vir Chakra

Captain Neikezhakuo Kengurüse MVC
- Born: 15 July 1974; Nerhema, Kohima District, Nagaland, India
- Died: 28 June 1999 (aged 24); Black Rock, Kargil, Jammu & Kashmir, India
- Military career
- Allegiance: Republic of India
- Branch: Indian Army
- Service years: 1998–1999
- Rank: Captain
- Nicknames: Nimbu Sahib; Neibu
- Service number: IC-58396
- Units: 2nd Rajputana Rifles (Army Service Corps)
- Conflicts: Kargil War †
- Awards: Maha Vir Chakra

Captain Neikezhakuo Kengurüse, MVC (15 July 1974 – 28 June 1999) was an Indian Army officer from Nagaland.

Kengurüse was an officer of 2 Rajputana Rifles, who was posthumously awarded the Maha Vir Chakra, India's second highest gallantry award, for his exemplary valour in combat during operations in the Kargil War in 1999.

== Early life ==
Kengurüse was born at Nerhema village in Kohima District, Nagaland, India. His father was Neisielie Kengurüse. He had two brothers named Ngseue Kengurüse and Atoulie Kengurüse. He did his schooling at St. Xavier School in Jalukie and graduated from Kohima Science College.

He worked as a teacher at the Government High School in Kohima from 1994 to 1997.

== Military career ==
Kengurüse passed the Combined Defence Services Examination in 1996 and joined the Indian Military Academy, Dehradun in Jun 1997 to fulfill his dream of serving the Indian army.

Kengurüse was commissioned into the Army Service Corps of the Indian Army on 12 December 1998, and was in the midst of his field attachment with the 2nd Rajputana Rifles battalion.

He was fondly nicknamed Neibu by his family and friends. Some soldiers under his command called him Nimbu Sahib. A memorial was constructed at Pheza Village in his memory.

== Kargil War ==
On 28 June 1999, at Lone Hill, Drass sector as the commander of Ghatak platoon, a commando platoon, Kenguruse was assigned the task to evict Pakistani soldiers holding a machine gun post at Black Rock, Dras Sector and to capture the area. Kengurüse established foothold for his platoon at 16000 feet (environmental temperature was at -10 deg. Celsius).

Being inspired by the renowned headhunter Perheile, who was his great-great-grandfather, Kengurüse had to climb barefeet as he realised that his shoes are having gripping problem in the rocks. Without his shoes, Kengurüse reached the top and killed 2 infiltrators with his rifle and other 2 enemies in a hand-to-hand combat despite being shot in his abdomen.

Capt. Kengurüse is one of the top 15 decorated soldiers and officers of Kargil War.

== Maha Vir Chakra ==
The citation for the Maha Vir Chakra reads as follows:

Operation: Op Vijay - Kargil

Effective Date of Award: 28 Jun 1999

CITATION

CAPTAIN NEIKEZHAKUO KENGURÜSE (IC-58396)
2 RAJPUTANA RIFLES (ASC)

(POSTHUMOUS)

Captain Neikezhakuo Kengurüse was the Ghatak Platoon Commander during the attack on Area Black Rock in the Drass Sector on the night of 28 June 1999 during Operation VIJAY.

He volunteered to undertake a daring commando mission of attacking a well-sited enemy machine gun position, on a cliff face, which was heavily interfering with all the approaches to the main objective of the Battalion. As the commando team scaled the cliff face, it came under intense mortar and automatic fire, which caused heavy casualties.

The officer sustained a splinter injury in his abdomen. Bleeding profusely yet undeterred, he urged his men to carry on with the assault. On reaching the final cliff face, the commando team was halted by a sheer rock wall that separated them from the enemy machine-gun post. The officer took off his shoes to get a good grip and scaled the rock wall carrying with him a rocket launcher, which he fired at the enemy position.

Unmindful of his personal safety, the officer thereafter charged at the enemy position and personally killed two men with his rifle and another two with his commando knife in a hand-to-hand combat before succumbing to his injury.

By his daredevil act, Captain Neikezhakuo Kengurüse single-handedly neutralised the enemy position, which had tied up the Battalion's progress.

Captain Neikezhakuo Kengurüse displayed conspicuous gallantry indomitable resolve, grit and determination beyond the call of duty and made the supreme sacrifice in the face of the enemy, in true traditions of the Indian Army.

== Honour ==
- The Army Service Corps in Bangalore has an entrance gate named in his honour.
- There is a statue of Capt Neikezhakuo Kengurüse near the gate of the Army Service Corps Centre (South).
- The Assam Rifles established the Capt (Late) N Kenguruse, MVC Centre of Excellence and Wellness at Chieswema, Kohima in Nagaland in 2022

== See also ==
- Padmapani Acharya
