= Neiliezhü Üsou =

Indian theologian (1941–2009)

The Reverend Neiliezhü Üsou
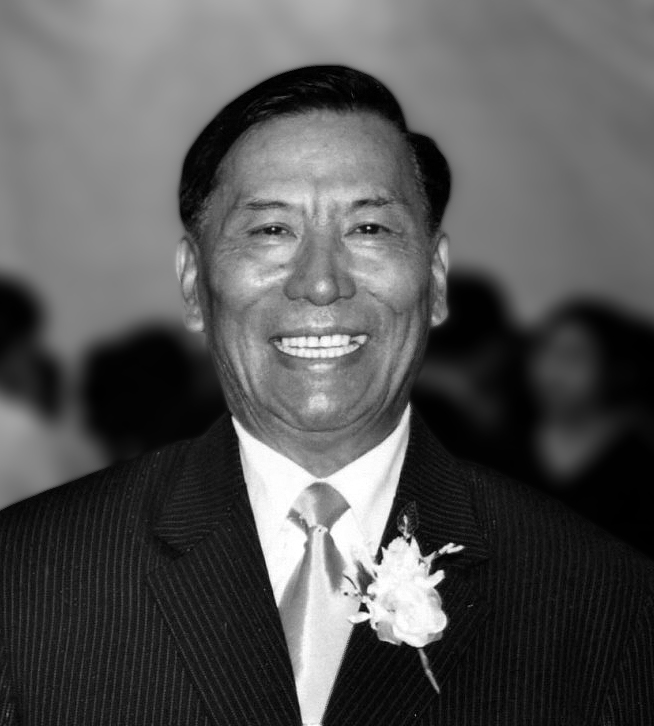
- Üsou in May 2002
- Born: 7 July 1941; Nerhema, Naga Hills District, Assam Province, British India (Now Nerhema, Kohima District, Nagaland, India)
- Died: 30 January 2009 (aged 67); Kohima, Nagaland, India
- Spouse: Rüülhou-ü Üsou (m. 1965)
- Children: 7
- Awards: Bharat Jyoti Award (2000), International Gold Star Award (2001), Jawaharlal Nehru Excellence Award (2001)

Neiliezhü Üsou (7 July 1941 – 30 January 2009) was an Indian baptist minister and public leader from Nagaland. He was known for his interpretive skills, sermons and involvement with the State Government.

== Early life, education and family ==
Neiliezhü Üsou was born on 7 July 1941 to an Angami Naga family from Nerhema Village. His father, Putsolie Üsou, was the village head. His early education was at the village primary school. He came from a non-Christian family, and was inspired to become a missionary by witnessing B. I. Anderson, an American missionary, and his wife playing piano accordion during their visit to Nerhema Village Baptist Church in 1951, led by Kenneth Kerhüo. He was baptised by water on 13 March 1953, from Rev. Kevizelie. He joined the Naga National Movement and went underground for sometime. He resurfaced and continued his schooling in Government High School, Kohima. He joined Eastern Theological College (ETC), Jorhat, Assam and did his Bachelor of Theology from 1960 to 1964. Seeing his interest in music he was sent to Leonard Theological College (LTC), Jabalpur, Madhya Pradesh by an American missionary, Dr. Frederick S. Downs, where he did his Religious Education in Church Music from 1964 to 1965.

Üsou joined Baptist English School in Kohima as teacher and married the youngest daughter of Rev. Zhapuzhülie Sekhose, Rüülhou-ü, on 18 December 1965, at the age of 24. Rev. Dr. Neiliezhü Üsou and his wife Rüülhou-ü had seven children: three sons and four daughters. They had two daughters-in-law, two sons-in-law and eight grandchildren. Most of the children are involved in Christian Ministry.

== Ministry ==
=== Angami Baptist Church Council (ABCC) ===
After his theological studies he joined the Angami Baptist Church Council (ABCC) as Superintendent of Mission Hostel under ABCC from 1966 to 1968 and also in 1971. He also served as Youth Director of ABCC in 1968, 1971 and as Youth Promoter in 1972. He started Nagaland Christian Youth Movement (NCYM) in 1970 and Angami Youth Gospel Team (AYGT) in 1971 as the Director respectively.

The ABCC gave him license in 1974 and in 1975 he was appointed as Evangelist-at-Large and held the same post until 1977. He was the Vice President of the ABCC during 1987 to 1989.

=== Nagaland Baptist Church Council (NBCC) ===
Üsou was the first Honorary Youth Director of Nagaland Baptist Church Council (NBCC) in 1972 and actively participated in the Billy Graham Crusade held in Kohima the same year. He became the Liaison Committee member of Nagaland Peace Council under the aegis of NBCC from 1975 till 2009. He led the Naga Choir as a Choir Director to India Youth for Christ convention in 1975 at Kolkata.

Üsou along with other members of Nagaland Peace Council met the then Prime Minister of India, Indira Gandhi, and Home Minister, Giani Zail Singh, in October 1979 at the Prime Minister's Office, New Delhi in connection with peace work in Nagaland. He actively took part in the movement spearheaded by Nagaland Baptist Church Council for total liquor prohibition in Nagaland which finally culminated in the Government of Nagaland passing the, still widely debated, Nagaland Liquor Total Prohibition Act (NLTP) in 1989 in the Nagaland State Legislative Assembly.

He attended the 16th Baptist World Alliance Congress at Seoul, South Korea, 14–18 August 1990 and was among the 370 ordained ministers from 149 countries to take part in a mass Baptism at the Olympic rowing competition site in Misari Regatta, where 10,000 candidates received water baptism.

=== Council of Baptist Churches in North East India (CBCNEI) ===
In 1974 he was sent by the Council of Baptist Churches in Northeast India (CBCNEI) to Arunachal Pradesh to conduct a two-week music seminar. At this time, Arunachal Pradesh was known for persecution of Christians. He successfully carried out the dangerous mission, conducting music classes in the afternoons and Bible studies in the evenings.

=== Ministers' Hill Baptist Church (MHBC) ===
Üsou was installed as full-time pastor on 1 October 1978, at Ministers' Hill Baptist Church (MHBC), located at a hillock named Ministers' Hill Colony because it quarters Government ministers. He successfully completed twenty five years as full-time pastor and was conferred the title of Senior Pastor during the Silver Jubilee celebration held on 12 October 2003, attended by many Church leaders and believers from various Churches including the State Chief Minister, Neiphiu Rio. The same evening a musical concert was organized to honour him. He opened the concert singing his favourite song "His Eye Is on the Sparrow". Many local musicians and veteran singers participated. He was ordained on 20 December 1981, by Rev. L. Bizo at Ministers' Hill Baptist Church (MHBC) and celebrated twenty-five years as an ordained minister on 20 December 2006. During his Pastorship the Church grew from strength to strength, the Church managed school Ministers' Hill Baptist English School was alleviated to Higher Secondary level, Ministers' Hill Baptist Higher Secondary School (MHBHSS), in 1998. The Church and the School has been producing many theologians and missionaries. His dream project "The new church building" was completed and dedicated by him on 22 December 2002.

=== The Royal British Legion (RBL) ===
Üsou served as Officiating Chaplain of the Royal British Legion (RBL) from 1994 till 2009. Kohima is famous for the Battle of Kohima between the British and Japanese during the Second World War. The slain soldiers of UK, India and Nagaland are buried in Kohima War Cemetery. Every three years the relatives and war survivors from the United Kingdom visit Kohima for memorial services where he conduct these solemn occasions.

He chaired the Remembrance Day service along with some Agape members from Japan led by Keiko Holmes, recipient of OBE, working for reconciliation on 11 November 2002, at Kohima War Cemetery.

=== Revival crusades ===
He conducted several Revival Crusades in Nagaland and was invited to a number of such crusades and Churches to speak. He was considered to be one of the best interpreters in Nagaland and has interpreted renowned preachers including Billy Kim, Frederick S. Downs and Roger Houstma. His interpretive skill was marked by speed, accuracy and enthusiasm.

== Music ==
Apart from his education in Church music, Üsou did a Condensed Piano Course from Kolkata in 1972 to equip himself better. He played several musical instruments with the piano accordion his favorite. He formed his family musical band christened "Üsou's Instrumental Praise" in 2002, where he played piano accordion; his three sons on piano, saxophone, acoustic and bass guitar, Hawaiian guitar, drum and a daughter on violin and cello. They are considered to be the only musical family in Nagaland and they perform in different concerts, government functions and Churches.

Üsou was a composer with many original songs, including a number of theme songs which are performed by the respective members on appropriate and specific occasions.

=== School of Music ===
He established the first government-approved institute for Music studies in Nagaland, the School of Music, Kohima, on 13 August 1969, and held the position of Founding Proprietor until his death. The school has been producing many amateur musicians and Church pianists and now offers programmes of study in voice, violin, piano, saxophone, drums and conducting departments under the music exam boards of ABRSM (the Associated Board of the Royal Schools of Music) and Trinity Guildhall, London.

== Governmental engagement ==
Üsou was closely associated with successive Governments in Nagaland. Some of his notable engagements with the Government were:

- During the occasion of distribution of tickets to a Political party for Nagaland general election in 1987 by the then Prime Minister of India, Rajiv Gandhi, he offered Dedicatory prayer for the candidates and for peaceful election.
- He dedicated the newly built Nagaland State Secretariat Building with over 200 rooms on 30 May 1994.
- He invoked God's blessings during the State level peace rally held on 13 March 1999, participated by thousands of people where Sonia Gandhi was the Chief Guest.
- He offered dedicatory prayer at the inauguration of the newly built Governor's Office, the Naga Bhavan, at Raj Bhavan, Kohima on 15 August 1999.
- He also invoked God's blessing for the Kargil War heroes on the occasion of Kargil Vijay Diwas at Durbar Hall, Raj Bhavan, Kohima on 26 July 2000.
- During the Indian Republic Day celebration on 26 January 2002, he chaired the farewell ceremony of the outgoing Governor of Nagaland, Om Prakash Sharma, and delivered the farewell message at Durbar Hall, Raj Bhavan, Kohima.
- He offered invocation prayer on the public reception to the new Governor of Nagaland, Shyamal Datta on 4 February 2002.
- He offered dedicatory prayer at the inauguration of the Multi Purpose Sports Complex at Indira Gandhi Stadium, Kohima, on 1 August 2007, where Union Minister for Ministry of Youth Affairs and Sports, Mani Shankar Aiyar, was the Chief Guest.

== Other community activities ==
- He was twice Chairman of Kohima Baptist Pastors' Fellowship (KBPF) in 1982 and from 1995 to 2004. Prompted by the resolution passed on 27 March 1984, by the Kohima Baptist Pastors' Fellowship that Tribal tunes and songs could be used in Christian worship, an Indigenous Tribal Music Concert was organized at Kohima College Auditorium under his chairmanship on 8 June 1984, which was wholeheartedly participated by all Naga Tribal Churches in Kohima.
- He was the President of All Nagaland Baptist Pastors' Union (ANBPU) from 1994 till 1999 and President of Kohima Baptist Church Council (KBCC) from 1999 till 2001. One of Üsou's most remarkable achievement is that under his leadership the Kohima Baptist Pastors' Fellowship (KBPF) organized a mass Holy Communion on Easter Sunday sunrise service held at Kohima War Cemetery on 16 April 1995, where believers from different denominations from all over Kohima city, in thousands, took part.
- He baptized and served the Holy Communion to the Naga Vigil Prisoner of Conscience, David P. Ward, a British citizen, on 12 March 1993, in Kohima District Jail.
- He was the Convenor of the historic Naga Shisha Hoho Assembly where 120,000 Nagas congregated from 25 to 27 February 1994, and pledged to pray for peace and unity amongst the people.

== Awards and honors ==
Neiliezhü Üsou was awarded the prestigious Glory of India Award (also called Bharat Jyoti Award) on 21 December 2000; International Gold Star Millennium Award and the Jawaharlal Nehru Excellence Award for enriching human life and outstanding attainments on 2 March 2001, by the India International Friendship Society (IIFS) at New Delhi.

He was conferred Doctorate in Divinity (D.D) by the International Institute of Church Management (IICM) on 24 August 2002, at Gurukul Theological College, Chennai.

== Works ==
Üsou researched Naga indigenous music from 1981 to 1984 and published a booklet and also produced an audio cassette in 1985 with an aim to bring the Naga tribes closer through spiritual unity. He also produced his own audio cassette of Christmas songs.

He compiled a number of song books which are widely used in school assemblies and revival meetings. His book Elementary Music is used in Nagaland Schools as an externally assessed subject approved by Nagaland Board of School Education (NBSE). He also wrote a book on Naga Music, Naga Identity which was published in 2007.

== Later years ==
He fell sick in the first part of 2006 and was admitted to Sir Ganga Ram Hospital, New Delhi in the month of August and underwent major surgery. The Chief Minister of Nagaland, Neiphiu Rio, and many other dignitaries and well-wishers visited him at the hospital. He was admitted to Apollo Hospital, New Delhi for follow-up treatment.

Under his chairmanship his native village Nerhema Baptist Church successfully celebrated 100 years of Christianity from 15 to 17 December 2006. In July 2007, Üsou launched the Naga Global Mission (NGM). The most significant achievement of this Mission is having supported two missionaries in China. Soon after, he visited the United States during August 2007 on the invitation by Mt. Gilead Church, Indianapolis and gave sermons in different churches in Indianapolis, Kentucky, Michigan and Ohio.

His family band Üsou's Instrumental Praise gave a music concert at the State Academy Hall, Kohima on 25 October 2007, under the theme "Transcend" which was attended by the State Chief Minister, his Cabinet colleagues and many well-wishers. Üsou's performance in this concert is seen as his last public performance.

=== Declining health and death ===
His health deteriorated and he was once again rushed to Apollo Hospital, New Delhi and in the month of November 2007, he was shifted to Tata Memorial Hospital in Mumbai for further treatment. For the first time in his entire ministry he was compelled to spend the festive season of Christmas far away from his family and Church. It was during this very critical period that the Nagaland Baptist Church Council (NBCC) General Secretary, Rev. Zhabu Terhüja, wrote an appeal to all the Nagaland Churches to pray for his health. Prayers of the believers were answered and he came back home stronger and was able to continue serving the Lord by being one of the main speakers during the crucial Naga Peace Convention held from 22 to 24 February 2008, at Dimapur.

Üsou died on 30 January 2009, at Naga Hospital, Kohima. His remains were kept for two days in his residence enabling thousands of mourners to pay their respects. His funeral service took place at 2:00 PM IST on Sunday, 1 February 2009, in his Church (MHBC) and was attended by thousands. His death was mourned by the then Governor of Nagaland, K. Sankaranarayanan, the then Governor of Maharashtra, S.C. Jamir, Naga Hoho, different organizations and Churches in Nagaland and the United States. Speakers at the Funeral included the Chief Minister of Nagaland; representatives from various government and civil societies.

== Legacy ==
=== Rev. Dr. Neiliezhü Üsou Memorial Award for Music ===
For his contribution to the growth of music in Nagaland, an award in Music was instituted and approved by the Nagaland Board of School Education (NBSE). The first awarding of Rev. Dr. Neiliezhü Üsou Memorial Award for Music to the highest scorer in Music in High School Leaving Certificate (HSLC) examination in Nagaland was held on 6 June 2009, at the Rev. Dr. Neiliezhü Üsou Memorial Hall. Shürhozelie Liezietsu, Minister for Higher and Technical Education and Urban Development, Nagaland presented the award as the Chief Guest of the auspicious occasion. This award is given annually and carries a citation, memento and cash money of ₹ 25,000.

=== Anniversary of death ===
His first memorial service entitled "A Tribute: A life time of memories through Music and Testimonial" was held on 30 January 2010, at Ministers' Hill Baptist Church (MHBC) and was attended by family, church leaders, members, friends and well-wishers.

=== Rev. Dr. Neiliezhü Usou Memorial School (RDNUMS) ===
A school was established and inaugurated on 27 July 2013, by the Chief Minister of Nagaland. The school follows a structured, play based curriculum.

== See also ==
- Christianity in India
