= Vizol Angami =

Indian politician

4th Chief Minister of Nagaland
- In office 25 November 1977 – 18 April 1980
- Preceded by: President's rule
- Succeeded by: S. C. Jamir
- In office 26 February 1974 – 10 March 1975
- Preceded by: Hokishe Sema
- Succeeded by: John Bosco Jasokie

Member of Parliament, Rajya Sabha
- In office 3 April 1992 – 2 April 1998
- Preceded by: Khyomo Lotha
- Succeeded by: Chubatoshi Apok Jamir
- Constituency: Nagaland

Personal details
- Born: Vizol Vitso-n Koso; 16 November 1914 Viswema, Naga Hills District, Assam Province, British India (Now in Kohima District, Nagaland, India)
- Died: 3 March 2008 (aged 93) Kohima, Nagaland, India
- Resting place: Viswema Baptist Church (Old location)
- Party: United Democratic Front (Nagaland)
- Spouse: Razoulhou-ü (m. 1948)
- Children: 6
- Education: St. Edmund's College, Shillong (B.A.)

Vizol Vitso-n Koso (16 November 1914 – 3 March 2008) was an Indian politician from Nagaland who served as the 4th Chief Minister of Nagaland twice from February 1974 until March 1975 and November 1977 until April 1980. He became the Chief Minister of Nagaland as part of the United Democratic Front (Nagaland).

== Early life ==
Vizol Vitso-n Koso was born on 16 November 1914 to a Southern Angami family from Viswema. He did his initial education from Mission High School, Kohima. He completed his matriculation from Government High School in Shillong. In 1951 he graduated from St. Edmund's College, Shillong.

During the Second World War, Vizol joined the Royal Indian Air Force and served as a pilot until 1946. After the war, he served as a private teacher in John High School, Viswema. Vizol was one of the founding members of the Kohima Science College, Jotsoma in 1961.

== Naga nationalism ==
From 1953 to 1956, Vizol served as the Principal of the Naga National High School, Kohima. In 1956 and 1957 Vizol was imprisoned twice on political grounds. He served as the Vice President of the Naga People's Convention from 1957 to 1960. In 1964, Vizol nominated Muivah for the general secretary of Naga National Council at Tuzol Sokha, a forested area near Viswema village.

Vizol was elected a member of the first Nagaland Assembly in February 1964 from the Southern Angami II Assembly constituency as a Naga National Democratic Party candidate (later became the Nagaland People's Council) and later became the leader of the Opposition until it resigned en bloc after a ceasefire agreement was signed in September 1964. He did not contest the second state elections in 1969.

== Peace initiatives ==
In 1966, Vizol was part of the five member-Nagaland Peace Commission formed in Kohima as an initiative of the Nagaland Baptist Church Council. It passed a resolution asking government authorities and public to strengthen peace work in Nagaland. Along with Vizol Angami, Nabakrushna Choudhuri, Lakshmi N. Menon, Mayangnokcha Ao, and Nivukha were part of the commission. They met the Naga underground leaders at Chedema.

== Political career ==
=== First term as Chief Minister (1974–75) ===
He was re-elected in 1974 from the Southern Angami II constituency, and was unanimously chosen as the leader of United Democratic Front party and was appointed the Chief Minister of Nagaland. The government later collapsed due to defections in 1975 orchestrated by the Indira Gandhi government with assistance from the army to help the Nagaland Nationalist Organisation (NNO) party which lasted ten days. This was followed by imposition of the President's rule for 32 months beginning from 22 March 1975.

=== Second term as Chief Minister (1977–80) ===
Vizol was again re-elected uncontested to the Nagaland Assembly in 1977 and became the Chief Minister for the second time but it again collapsed in 1980.

== Post Chief Ministership ==
In the subsequent general elections in 1982 and 1987, Vizol failed to get elected.

In the 1989 elections, he kept out of the fray but led the newly formed Nagaland People's Council, the new name of Naga National Democratic Party, currently known as the Naga People's Front (NPF), as party chairman. He contested the 1989 Lok Sabha election, but lost to Congress candidate Shikiho Sema. Vizol was a member of the Rajya Sabha from 1992 to 1998 and also a member of the Parliamentary Committee on Communication, Energy, Gas, Afforestation and Eco-development.

Vizol was the founding member of the Nagaland State Branch of the Indian Red Cross Society in 1982, and served as its chairman till he resigned in 2004, on health grounds. He was known to lead a life of simplicity, honesty and peace loving, his way of life setting an example to be emulated by others.

== Death ==
Vizol died on 3 March 2008 at 07:10 Indian Standard Time (UTC+05:30), at his personal residence in Daklane Ward, Kohima after a prolonged illness and his remains were laid to rest at Viswema.

== Personal life ==
Vizol married Razoulhou-ü in 1948. Together the couple had two daughters and four sons.
