= T. Aliba Imti =

Indian politician (1919–1988)

Founder of NNC
- Incumbent
- Assumed office 1945

Indian Frontier Service

Member of Parliament, Rajya Sabha
- Incumbent
- Assumed office 1980

Personal details
- Born: Temjenliba Imti; 27 September 1918 Impur Mission Compound, Naga Hills District, Assam Province, British India (Now in Mokokchung District, Nagaland, India)
- Died: 1988 (aged 69–70) Mokokchung, Mokokchung District, Nagaland, India
- Party: NNC, NNDP
- Spouse: Asangla Imlong
- Education: St. Edmund's College, Shillong, Gauhati University

T. Aliba Imti (also, Temjenliba Imti) was a Naga leader from India who was instrumental in the development of the post-independence Naga Identity. He was the founding president of the Naga National Council (NNC).

His first order as president was to boycott the 15th of August, Indian independence day as he and his fellow NNC workers had declared the 14th of August as Naga Independence Day. He was also president of the Ao Students Conference (i.e.AKM) for 1944–46. During his tenure a resolution was passed to create a combined Naga Students body. He did the ground work to contact the other student bodies and this led to the formation of the Naga Students Federation (NSF) on the 29 of Oct 1947 with Z.Ahu as the first president.

He was also a member of the constitution making body representing the tribals of the north east. During these times he also edited and published a newspaper for the NNC under the banner "The Naga Nation" . He entered civil service as assistant political officer (IFAS) in 1950. He was elected president of the regional party (UDF/ NNDP/ NPC in 1976) and continued till his death in 1988.

He was the first chairman of the Hills Regional Parties of North east India 1979. He was elected to the Rajya Sabha 1980. During his tenure as an MP he created the forum of Christian MPs. Again during his tenure on General Budget discussions on 21-03-83 he stated that "India must recognise Israel". As at that time India didn't have full-fledged diplomatic relations with the latter.

== Early life and family ==
Aliba was born on 27 September 1918 at the Impur Mission Centre. He was the second eldest son of Imtilepden, a teacher the Impur Mission School who later became a pastor, and Amakjungla; both from Longjang village, Naga Hills District, British India, in the present-day Mokokchung district.

Aliba did his early studies at the mission school, and later, matriculated from Shillong Government School in first division. He joined St. Edmund's College in Shillong and completed his B.A. (Hons.) from University of Calcutta in 1946.

He married Asangla Imlong, the eldest child of OBE Imlong Chang (Civil Division - Merchant 1939 British Empire Medal) who was a Naga pioneer, founding father of the modern Nagas under the British rule and one of the founders of Mokokchung town and Fazal Ali College.

Aliba was from the second generation of Christian Nagas and from the first generation to be educated to Bachelors level.

== Student leader ==
In 1939 as a student in Shillong, he founded the Naga Students Union, and was its first Secretary.

It was here that he came in contact with several personalities like Subhash Chandra Bose, and Jawaharlal Nehru. He interacted with them and also attended their public meetings. These activities were reported to the British S.D.O at Mokokchung. This in turn led to his father being summoned to the headquarters of the S.D.O. Where he was warned to inform his son to avoid contact with such personalities, or else lose his job.

=== Naga Student Federation ===
Aliba was President of the 'Ao Students Conference' from 1944 to 1946. During his tenure the resolution to create a combined Naga Students body was passed. He was entrusted by the Ao Students Conference to contact leaders of various student bodies for the same. Thus, he contributed towards the formation of the Naga Students Federation which came into being at Kohima on the 29th of October, 1947 with Z. Ahu as president.

== Naga National Council ==
=== Foundation of NNC ===
After his graduation, in September 1946, T. Aliba Imti was elected as the First joint Secretary of the Naga National Council (NNC) where by the 7th of November, 1946 he opened the NNC office in Kohima.

At the Kohima meeting in August 1947 he was elected the First President of the NNC. His first order as president, was a call to the Nagas to boycott the 15th August Independence Day of India (Nagas declared Independence on 14 August).

T. Aliba Imti was a pacifist and fought for the Nagas on the principle of Non-violence and non-cooperation with India.

Some of his political activities and interactions with Mildred Archer are accounted in her book 'Journey to Nagaland', which is an account of her time in the Naga Hills in 1947.

=== Rejection of the Coupland Plan - British Crown Colony proposal ===
Under the leadership of T. Aliba Imti, the Nagas on 19th Dec' 1946 made a strong appeal to the three member British Cabinet Mission; Who had had come to India to make further plans for the post independence of India. Aliba appealed to the Cabinet Mission that the British Parliament must not make any arbitrary decision nor make any future plan for Nagas without proper consultation with the NNC.

The British had a plan to make the Naga Hills a "British Crown Colony" under a name called Coupland Man. However, owing to strong resistance by NNC leaders that plan could not be materialised.

Imti and his colleagues did not compromise on the proposal. During the course of that discussion Jawaharlal Nehru was fully aware of the aspiration of Nagas that Nagas and Indian are two separate neighboring nations thus he himself declined the 'Coupland plan" in support of Nagas saying. "The tribal areas (Nagas) are defined as being that long frontier of India, which are neither part of India nor Burma nor of any foreign power". Thus T. Aliba Imti played a most significant and diplomatic role in regards to Nagas right to independence and freedom from being subjected to any outside nation.

=== The Ten Year Guardianship Plan ===
From 9th Dec' 1946, the Indian constituency assembly begun to make their own constitution to be applied after their independence in the same way the Nagas also begun to prepare their own constitution apart from customary law. However owing to lack of peer knowledge in making of written constitution, the NNC leader led by T. Aliba Imti had resolved to set up an interim Government and live with India for a period of 10 years, during that period the Indian Government would act as a guardian power over the interim government of Nagaland.

As per the resolution of NNC T. Aliba Imti signed and submitted a memorandum to the Government of British India on 20th Feb' 1947, in regards to live with Government of India for the period of 10 years.

After that during May 1947 the Indian constituent assembly delegation had appealed the NNC Leader to join with Indian union. However T Aliba Imti and his colleague stood firm on the 20th Feb' memorandum. Therefore, the Indian delegates went back without any concrete decision.

=== Hydari Agreement - Nine Point Agreement ===
After that, Sir. Akbar Hydari the Governor of Assam held a meeting with T. Aliba Imti and his fellow NNC Leaders from 27 to 29 June 1947. However, despite repeated request to the NNC leaders to join with the Indian union the NNC did not agree to the appeal of the Indian leaders, therefore an agreement called 9 point agreement was made on mutual term where as T. Aliba Imti signed on behalf of the Interim Government of Nagaland and Sir. Akbar Hydari signed on behalf of Government of India. This agreement was made with the wider scope. So as to unite the entire displaced Naga inhabited area under the common National umbrella of NNC (Nagaland).

It was the dream of T. Aliba Imti that every Naga inhabited area including illegally displaced Nagas living in Myanmar be brought under the common national jurisdiction of Nagaland and to integrate the entire Nagas inhabited areas as one nation and one people.

When the Nagas declared independence on 14 August 1947 this declaration was also specially conveyed to U.N.O. who acknowledged and felicitated the proclamation put the name of Naga country in the member list of nation under U.N.O. on the same date.

== North East India Sub-Committee of Indian constituent Assembly ==
After the formation of the NNC T. Aliba Imti was selected as a member of the North East India Sub-Committee of Indian constituent Assembly. During his tenure, he toured various parts of the present day North-east and parts of present-day Bangladesh (Sylhet and surrounding areas) to get the views and opinions of the people. During this time, he also edited and published a newspaper for the NNC under the banner "The Naga Nation".

The members of the said committee held several rounds of talks and meetings in regard to the constitution of India. The majority of the members of the North East Sub-Committee met at Shillong and agreed to join the Indian union when India got its independence from British Empire, however Aliba refused to sign up.

He wrote - "However as being the committed patriot and responsible president of the NNC over swelteringly appointed on the mandate of Nagas who had the veto power to decide the future of Nagas political status, strongly defended the rights of the freedom of Nagas bravely stood firm on the legitimate rights of the freedom of Nagas and said "that' we the Nagas cannot sign our names to be under India. We do not agree with it and we resign. I cannot return to my people as a Traitor."

== Civil service ==
T. Aliba Imti entered Indian civil services under the Indian Frontier Administrative Service (IFAS) as Assistant Political Officer in 1950. He served in North East Frontier Agency (NEFA) present day Arunachal Pradesh for 11 years.

Bomdila, the present headquarters of Kameng district was literally carved out of virgin forest by Imti with the help of 30 local porters.

While at Tawang, he also had to meet clandestinely with the representatives of the Tibetan Government, before the Dalai Lama fled from his country to India. During which time he was the Political Officer directly responsible for welcoming the Holiness into India.

He was also involved in the survey and drafting of the borders and map of the region.

=== Indian Frontier Administrative Service ===
He was posted to the following places from 1950 until he retired as Secretary to the Government of Nagaland in 1971:

- Charduar
- Tawang
- Bomdila
- Tuensang
- Shillong
- Ziro
- Kohima
- Zunheboto
- Mon
- Tuensang
- Kohima
- Mokokchung

== Rajya Sabha ==
Aliba Imti was also appointed as Member of Parliament for the Upper House or the Rajya Sabha from 1980 till 1986.

== Death and legacy ==
Imti died after a short illness in 1988 at his home in Mokokchung town. He had three children and numerous grandchildren at the time of his death.
