= Macnivil =

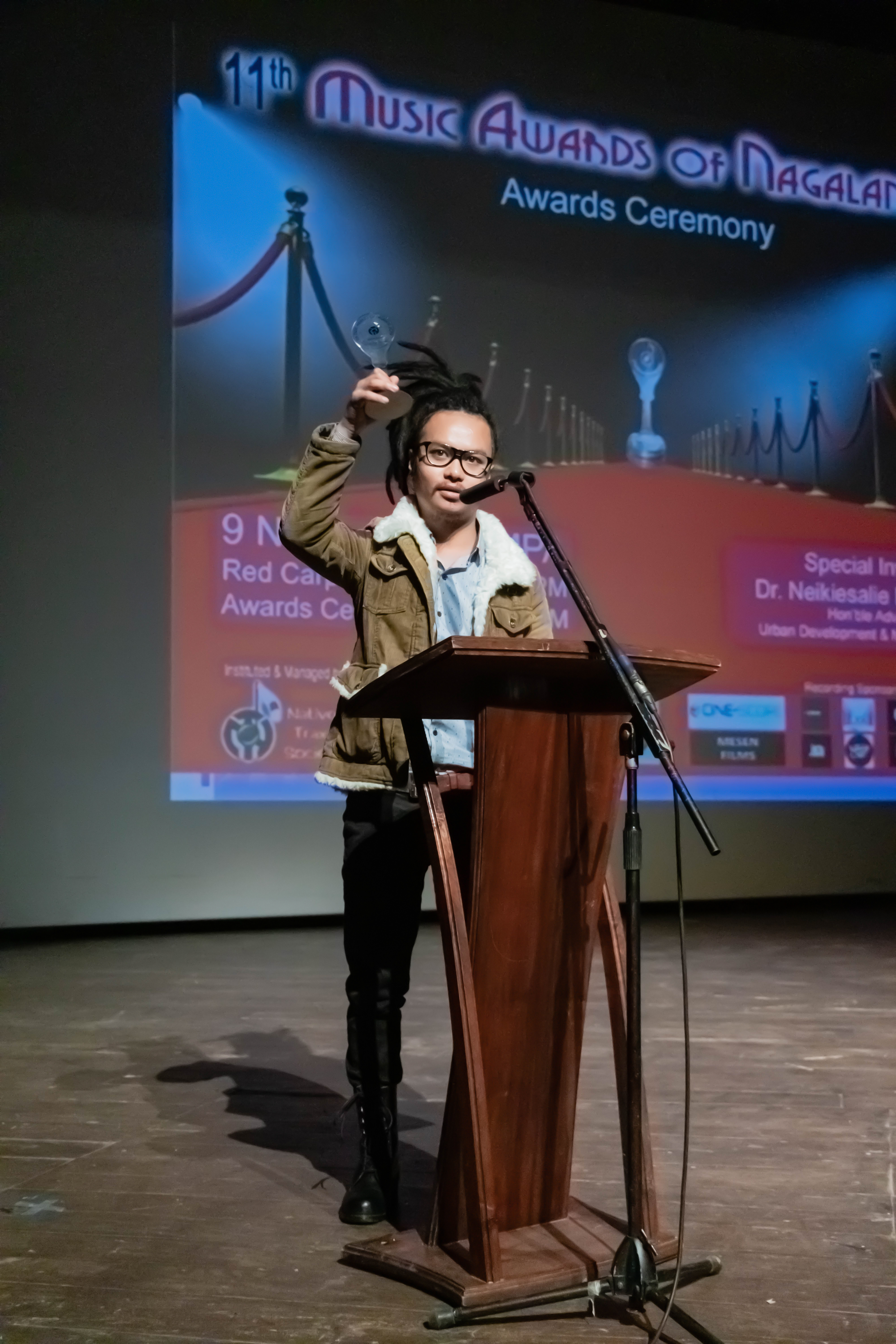
- Macnivil in 2019
- Born: Akaba Martin Longkümer; 7 July 1992 (age 34); Kohima, Nagaland, India
- Occupations: Rapper; singer-songwriter; composer; recording artist; music video director
- Years active: 2012–present
- Musical career
- Origin: Kohima, Nagaland
- Genres: Hip hop; rap
- Label: Nestvibe Ent.

Akaba Martin Longkümer (born 7 July 1992), known professionally as Macnivil, is an Indian rapper, songwriter and music video director from Nagaland. He is considered as one of the pioneers of the Nagamese Hip hop scene in Nagaland. He further gained success after the release of his album Ura Uvie.

== Early life and career ==
Macnivil was born on 7 July 1992 in Kohima, Nagaland to a Naga family. He has Ao Naga ancestry on his father's side and Konyak Naga ancestry on his mother's side. He did his schooling from Ministers' Hill Baptist Higher Secondary School in Kohima, Nagaland.

In 2019, Macnivil gained success for releasing Ura Uvie, the first ever rap album in the Nagamese language.

== Discography ==
=== Studio albums ===
- Ura Uvie (2019)

=== Other songs ===
- "The Warm Up (Freestyle)" (2019)
- "Tomorrow's Not The Same" (2021)

== Filmography ==
=== Music video directions ===
Title	Year	Artist(s)	Director of Photography	Production Company	Notes	Ref(s)
"Live Your Life"	2020	Macnivil		Nestvibe	Self direction	
"Last Goodbye"	2021	Arshilu Ozüküm		Nestvibe		
"Criminal"	2021	KryZtal		Nestvibe		
"Tomorrow's Not the Same"	2021	Macnivil feat. Ket Meth & TS Geneses	Rüprüvizo Koso	Nestvibe	Self direction	
"Perfect Stranger"	2021	Arshilu Ozüküm & KidDrinja		Nestvibe		
"Trauma"	2022	Ket Meth	Rüprüvizo Koso	Nestvibe		

== Awards and nominations ==
Year	Award	Category	Song	Result	Ref.
2019	Music Awards of Nagaland	Song of the Year	"Wait For Me"	Won	
2020	Music Awards of Nagaland	Best song – Rap/Hip hop	"Ura Uvie"	Won	
