= Neichülie-ü Nikki Haralu =

Indian ambassador

3rd Ambassador of India to Panama
- In office June 1978 – July 1980
- President: Neelam Sanjiva Reddy
- Preceded by: Chhedi Lal
- Succeeded by: M. L. Suri

Personal details
- Born: Neichülie-ü Nikki Haralu; 28 July 1918; Kohima, Naga Hills District, Assam Province, British India (Now Kohima, Nagaland, India)
- Died: 2 September 2016 (aged 98); Dimapur, Nagaland, India
- Occupation: Diplomat

Neichülie-ü Nikki Haralu (28 July 1918 – 2 September 2016) was an experienced Indian diplomat from Nagaland who served as Indian Ambassador to Panama, Costa Rica and Nicaragua from 1978–80. She also served as Chairman, Nagaland State Social Welfare Advisory Board after her retirement from Indian Foreign Service.

== Biography ==
Neichülie-ü Nikki Haralu was born in Kohima, in the then Naga Hills District of British India. Her father, Harielungbe Haralu of Poilwa, was the first Naga Physician, while her mother, Rükhrie-ü is from Kohima Village.

Haralu received her schooling in Kohima and Shillong. She graduated from the Scottish Church College, Calcutta University in 1948. Haralu went on to complete her master's degree in Haverford, US in the year 1953.
