= Tati (instrument) =

Naga string instrument

- Classification: Plucked string instrument

Tati, also known as Lubo, Libuh, Lobvü is a form of folksong sung with a single-stringed traditional musical instrument invented and used by the Nagas since time immemorial. It is popularly used by the Angami Nagas, Chakhesang Nagas and Mao Nagas to sing traditional folk music.

The instrument measuring about 3–4 foot in length is made of a dried carved-out bottle gourd. This bottle gourd is covered with thin film, such as the bladder of animals (originally) and attached to one end of a pole. A string is tied between the two ends of the pole over the film-covered carved bottle gourd.

Lu/Li/Lo is the folk song accompanied with the Tati instrument, Tati is a form of Lu/Li/Lo expression. Lu/Li/Lo can be in expression other than Tati.
