= The 16-Point Agreement =

1960 Naga–India treaty

16-Point Agreement
- Signed: 26 July 1960
- Location: New Delhi
- Signatories: Jawaharlal Nehru Imkongliba Ao; John Bosco Jasokie; S. C. Jamir; Khelhoshe; Etssorhom; Thanwang; Goyiepra Kenye; Litingse; Imtichuba Chang; Lakhimong Yimchunger; Thinochelie; Sentsei; Pauting Phom; P. Shilu Ao; RC Chiten Jamir; P Demo; H Zopianga Sashimeren Aier
- Parties: India; Naga People's Convention

The 16-Point Agreement was a bilateral agreement signed between the Naga People's Convention and the Government of India on 26 July 1960. It was a critical milestone in the journey towards resolving the Naga issue and establishing peace in the region.

== Significance ==
The Agreement marked a turning point in the history of Naga-India relations. It provided a framework for addressing the aspirations of the Naga people. The agreement laid the foundation for the creation of the state of Nagaland within the Indian Union, granting it a special status under Article 371A of the Indian Constitution, protecting and preserving the unique identity and culture of the Naga community.

== History ==
The Naga People's convention in its third session at Mokokchung adopted the 16th point agreement to resolve Naga political problems. The first resolution of the Naga People's Convention was to realize satisfactory political settlement and setting up of new political units as essentially an interim measure. Thus, the 16th point memorandum was made the basis of negotiation for creation of a full-fledged State within the Indian Union.”

== 16 point agreement ==
The 16 Point Agreement between the Government of India and the Naga People’s Convention 26 July 1960

1. The Name: The territories that were heretofore known as the Naga Hills-Tuensang Area under the Naga Hills-Tuensang Area Act, 1957, shall form a State within the Indian Union and he hereafter known as Nagaland.

2. The Ministry Incharge: The Nagaland shall be under the Ministry of External Affairs of the Government of India.

3. The Governor of Nagaland: (a) The President of India shall appoint a Governor for Nagaland and he will be vested with the executive powers of the Government of Nagaland. He will have his headquarters in Nagaland. (b) His administrative secretariat will be headed by the Chief Secretary stationed at the Headquarters with other Secretariat staff as necessary.(c) The Governor shall have special responsibility with regard to law and order during transitional period and for so long as the law and order situation continue to remain disturbed on account of hostile activities. In exercising this special responsibility, the Governor shall, after consultation with the Ministry, act in his individual judgement. This special responsibility of the Governor will cease when normalcy returns.

4. Council of Ministers:(d) There shall be a Council of Ministers with a Chief Minister at the head to assist and advise the Governor in the exercise of his functions.(e) The Council of Ministers shall be responsible to the Naga Legislative Assembly.

5. The Legislature: There shall be constituted a Legislative Assembly consisting of elected and nominated members as may be deemed necessary representing different tribes. (Further a duly constituted body of Expert may be formed to examine and determine the principles of representation on democratic basis).

6. Representation in the Parliament: Two elected members shall represent Nagaland in the Union Parliament, that is to say, one for the Lok Sabha and the other for the Rajya Sabha.

7. Acts of Parliament: No Act or law passed by the Union Parliament affecting the following provisions shall have legal force in the Nagaland unless specially applied to it by a majority vote of the Nagaland legislative Assembly:(a) The Religious or Social Practices of the Nagas.(b) The Customary Laws and Procedure.(c) Civil and Criminal Justice so far as these Concern decision according to the Naga Customary Law.The existing law relating to administration of civil and criminal justice as provided in the Rules for the Administration of Justice and Police in the Naga Hills District shall continue to be in force.(d) The ownership and transfer of law and its resources.

8. Local Self-Government: Each tribe shall have the following units of the rule making and administrative local bodies to deal with matters concerning the respective tribes and areas:(a) The Village Council;(b) The Range Council; and(c) The Tribal Council.The Council will also deal with disputes and cases involving breaches of customary laws and usages.

9. Administration of Justice: (a) The existing system of administration of civil and criminal justice shall continue.(b) Appellate Courts:(i) The District Court-cum-Sessions Court (for each district), High Court and Supreme Court of India;(ii) The Naga Tribunal (for the whole of Nagaland) in respect of cases decided according to customary law.

10. Administrative of Tuensang District: (a) The Governor shall carry on the administration of the Tuensang District for a period of 10 (ten) years until such time when the tribes in the Tuensang District are capable of shouldering more responsibility of advance system of administration in other parts of the Nagaland. (b) Provided further that a Regional Council shall be formed for Tuensang District by representatives from all the tribes in Tuensang District, and the Governor may nominate representative to the Regional Council as well. The Regional Council will elect Member of the Naga Legislative Assembly to represent Tuensang District. (c) Provided further that on the advance of the Regional Council, steps will be taken to start various Councils and Courts, in those areas where the people feel themselves capable of establishing such institutions. (d) Provided further that no Act or Law passed by the Legislative Assembly shall be applicable to Tuensang District unless specially recommended by the Regional Council. (e) Provided further that the Regional Council shall supervise and guide the working of the various Councils and Tribal Courts within Tuensang District wherever necessary and depute the local officers to act as Chairmen thereof. (f) Provided further that Council of such areas inhabited by a mixed population or which have not as yet decided to which specific Tribal Council be affiliated to, shall be directly under the Regional Council for the time being. And at the end of ten years the situation will be reviewed and if the people so desired the period will be further extended.

11. Financial Assistance from the Government of India: To supplement the revenues of Nagaland, there will be need for the Government of India to pay out of the Consolidated Fund of Nagaland, and a grant-in-aid towards meeting the cost of administration. Proposals for the above grants shall be prepared and submitted by the Government of Nagaland to the Government of India for their approval. The Government will have general responsibility for ensuring that the funds made available by the Government of India are expended for the purposes for which they have been approved.

12. Consolidation of Forest Areas: The delegation wished the following to the placed on record: "The Naga delegation discussed the question of the inclusion of the Reserve Forests and of contiguous areas inhabited by the Nagas. They were referred to the provisions in Article 3 and 4 of the Constitution, prescribing the procedure for the transfer of areas from one state to another".

13. Consolidation of Contiguous Naga Areas: The delegation wished the following to be placed on record: "The Naga leaders expressed the view that other Nagas inhabiting contiguous areas should be enabled to join the new state. It was pointed out to them on behalf of the Government of India that Article 3 and 4 of the Constitution provided for increasing the area of any state, but it was possible for the Government of India to make any commitment in this regard at this stage".

14. Formation of Separate Naga Regiment: In other that Naga people can fulfil their desire of playing a full role in the defence forces of India, the question of raising a separate Naga Regiment should be duly examined for action.

15. Transitional Period: (a) On reaching the political settlement with the Government of India, the Government of India will prepare a Bill for such amendment of the Constitution, as may be necessary, in order to implement the decision. The draft Bill, before presentation to Parliament, will be shown to the delegates of the NPC.(b) There shall be constituted an Interim Body with elected representatives from every tribe, to assist the advice the Governor in the administration of Nagaland during the transitional period. The tenure of office of the members of the Interim Body will be 3 (three) years subject to the re-election.

16. Inner Line Regulation: Rules embodied in the Bengal Eastern Frontier Regulation, 1873, shall remain in force in Nagaland
