= Edith Douglas Higher Secondary School =

Coordinates: 26°19.6′N 94°30.9′E

- Salangtem; Nagaland

Information
- Established: 1973; 53 years ago
- Founder: Rev. A.D.Jesudas
- Status: Private

Edith Douglas Higher Secondary School was established in the year 1973. It is one of the pioneer private schools in the town. It is situated in Salangtem, just on the banks of the Milak river. It was founded by Rev. A.D.Jesudas with funds from the Douglas Foundation in the US. Now, it is one of the largest schools in the state. It has three branch scattered in different parts of the town in order to gather to the needs of the residents.

1. John Douglas School in Yimyu Compound
2. K.L. (Kijungluba) Block in Kumlong Ward and
3. The main school at Salangtem.

The school has an orphanage and a hostel. The school celebrated its Silver Jubilee in 1997.
