= Mopungchuket =

- Village
- Location in Nagaland, India Mopungchuket (India)
- Coordinates: 26°23′36″N 94°32′11″E
- Country: India
- State: Nagaland
- District: Mokokchung
- Block: Kubolong

Government
  - Type: Village Council
  - Body: Mopungchuket Village Council

Languages
  - Official: English
- Time zone: UTC+5:30 (IST)
- PIN: PO Impur 798615
- Telephone code: 0369
- Vehicle registration: NL
- Lok Sabha constituency: Nagaland
- Vidhan Sabha constituency: Impur
- Climate: Temperate (Köppen)
- Website: nagaland.gov.in

Mopungchuket, also known as Aotemulung, is an Ao Naga village located 15 km from downtown Mokokchung, Nagaland, India.

Mopungchuket, one of the cleanest villages in Nagaland, is a popular rural tourism destination. Many travel writers and tourism publications have labeled Mopungchuket as perhaps the best kept village in Nagaland.

The village is associated with legends such as the love saga of Jina and Etiben, known as the Romeo and Juliet of the Ao Nagas. A tower commemorating their tragic story is a prominent landmark in the village.

At the vicinity of the village is a park with a mythological lake and an amphitheater. The Time-Pillar, Village Museum, Morung, Log-drums and nature trails are the other interests that make the village worth visiting.

The Ahoms army decided to retreat after an aborted attempt to invade this village.

Impur, the headquarters and the mission centre of Ao Baptist Arogo Mungdang (ABAM), established by American missionaries in 1894, is located adjacent to the village.

To know more about Mopungchuket, follow: https://mokokchung.nic.in/tourist-place/mopungchuket/ https://www.facebook.com/Mopungchuket
