= Sangyusang S. Pongener =

Indian folk artist

- Born: Ungma village, Mokokchung district, Nagaland, India
- Origin: Mokokchung district, Nagaland, India
- Genres: Ao Naga folk music
- Occupation: Folk artist
- Instrument: Vocals
- Award: Padma Shri (2026)

Sangyusang S. Pongener (born 23 March 1945), also known as Guru Pongener, is an Indian folk artist and composer from Nagaland. He is known for his work in the preservation and promotion of Ao Naga indigenous folk arts, including traditional music, dance, and theater. In 2026, he was awarded the Padma Shri in the field of art (folk music).

== Early life and education ==
Pongener was born in Ungma village, located in the Mokokchung district of Nagaland. He was the eldest of eight siblings. He attended Government Middle School in Ungma and later moved to Mokokchung for secondary education at Mayangnokcha Government Higher Secondary School. He subsequently attended Gauhati University.

== Career ==
Pongener began his involvement with Ao Naga folk traditions at an early age by learning traditional songs and dances from community elders in Ungma village, Mokokchung district, Nagaland. Over several decades, he has participated in performing and teaching aspects of Ao Naga folk music and cultural practices. His work has included training individuals and groups in traditional Ao songs and dances. He has been associated with programmes aimed at promoting and preserving indigenous cultural heritage.

In 1982, Pongener co-founded the Naga Wadir Club, a cultural organization registered under the Department of Home, Government of Nagaland, aimed at institutionalizing the safeguarding of Naga heritage. He has served as the organization’s general secretary.

He has composed approximately 60 original Ao cultural songs and has worked as an actor and director in folk theater. Since June 2024, he has served as a mentor under the Government of India’s Kala-Deeksha program, training youth in traditional Naga music and dance.

== Awards and recognition ==
- 2002: Sangeet Natak Akademi National Award.
- 2014: Received the Guru title by the North East Zone Cultural Centre (NEZCC), in collaboration with Indira Gandhi National Open University, New Delhi.
- 2017: Governor’s Award in Art and Music, Government of Nagaland.
- 2026: Awarded the Padma Shri for his contributions to the field of art.
