= Alichen =

- Urban Area
- Alichen Town
- 798607 Location in Nagaland, India
- Coordinates: 26.2697°N 94.455°E
- Country: India
- State: Nagaland
- District: Mokokchung

Government
  - Type: Chairman–council government.
  - Body: Alichen Council

Area
  - Total: 4.53 km^{2} (1.75 sq mi)

Languages
  - Official: English, Chungli Ao, Mongsen Ao
- Time zone: UTC+5:30 (IST)
- Vehicle registration: NL
- Website: nagaland.gov.in

Alichen is a town in Mokokchung district of Nagaland state in India. It is situated at the country side South of Mokokchung Town. It is the headquarters of the 2nd Battalion of the Nagaland Armed Police. 2001 census figures put the town's population at 4403 with 880 households. The number of children below the age of five is 572. Alichen Town is part of the Urban Station agglomeration.
