= Jina and Etiben =

Naga folk tale

Folk tale
- Name: Jina and Etiben
- Region: Ao Naga

"Jina and Etiben" is an Ao Naga folktale about two lovers from Mopungchuket who were tragically separated due to the differences in their social status.

== Plot ==
Etiben and Jina were the residents of Mopungchuket village during the 12th century. Jina was a poor, unrefined boy unlike Etiben who was intelligent, beautiful and belonged to a wealthy family. Etiben's beauty was known throughout the region and many rich and good looking men wanted to marry her. But Etiben was carried away by the love and charm of Jina and they became inseparable. As time went by, Jina and Etiben's love affair came to be known to every villager. Etiben's parents were greatly opposed to their relationship, and asked him for dowry if he wanted Etiben as his wife. Before Jina could arrange the money for dowry, another rich and handsome man named Tenyür came with the dowry and Etiben was married off to him. But Etiben's marriage did not stop her and Jina from meeting secretly in the fields. One day, when Jina and Etiben were together in the field, Tenyür caught them red handed and beat Etiben black and blue until she fell unconscious. She felt sick and her condition worsened and finally she died. Jina became so dismal and inconsolable that he also fell sick and never recovered, leading to his death.

Etiben and Jina's love got united only after their death.

== Cultural legacy ==
=== Stage and musical theater ===
The folktale has been adapted into many stage plays.

=== Literature ===
The folktale has also been adapted into a poem by Nabina Das and is taught in schools across Nagaland.

=== Jina and Etiben tower ===
The two lovers have been commemorated with their own towers and with additional sculptures at the Mopungchuket's ecology park.

== See also ==
- Naga folklore
