= Changki Ao language =

Dialect of the Ao language

Changki Ao
- Native to: India
- Region: Nagaland
- Ethnicity: Ao Naga
- Language family: Sino-Tibetan: Tibeto-Burman; Ao languages; Ao language; Changki Ao
- Writing system: Latin

Language codes
- ISO 639-3: None (mis)
- Glottolog: chan1311

Changki Ao is one of the dialects of the Ao language. The term "Changki" refers to the name of a village where it is spoken, which is located in the Jangpetkong range, one of the six mountain ranges in the Ao region. It is the smallest of the three Ao languages, the other two being Chungli Ao, the prestige dialect, and Mongsen Ao. Changki has historically been considered a subgroup of Mongsen, but there are notable differences between the two; intelligibility between Changki and Mongsen may only be a recent phenomenon.

== Location and prevalence ==
Using information from the 2011 Indian census, it was estimated that there could be around 10,000 speakers of Changki (and its varieties). This estimation derived from combining the populations of 8 villages and hamlets, in which researchers found Changki speakers (around 3,200 people), and an estimated 6,000-7,000 people from those villages that live in surrounding towns and cities.

== Phonology ==
The following phonology is derived from Temsunungsang & Changkija (2025).

=== Vowels ===
Changki Ao has 4 vowels:

	Front	Central	Back
Close	i		u
Mid		ə	
Open		a	

[e] is an allophone of /i/ and /a/, and [o] is an allophone of /u/.

=== Consonants ===
Changki Ao has 21 consonants:

		Bilabial	Dental	Post- alveolar	Palatal/ Pal-alv.	Velar	Glottal
Nasal		m	n			ŋ	
Plosive	voiceless	p	t			k	ʔ
Plosive	aspirated	pʰ	tʰ			kʰ	
Affricate	voiceless		t͡s		t͡ʃ		
Affricate	aspirated		t͡sʰ		t͡ʃʰ		
Fricative	voiced		z				
Fricative	voiceless		s				h
Approximant	voiced			ɹ	j		
Approximant	voiceless			ɹ̥			
Approximant	lateral			l			
