= Retroflex lateral fricative =

Retroflex lateral fricative may refer to:

- Voiceless retroflex lateral fricative
- Voiced retroflex lateral fricative
