= Ungma =

Ungma Soyim
- Village
- Nickname: Aoer Soyim
- Location in Nagaland, India Ungma (India)
- Coordinates: 26°19′N 94°32′E
- Country: India
- State: Nagaland
- District: Mokokchung

Government
  - Type: Ao Naga Putu menden (council)
  - Body: Ungma Village Council. (Tatar Kilem)

Languages
  - Dialect: Chungli
- Time zone: UTC+5:30 (IST)
- Vehicle registration: NL-02
- Website: nagaland.gov.in

Ungma is an Ao Naga village situated 10 km south of Mokokchung, Nagaland, India.It is the largest Village of the Ao region by population.The village is divided into two parts, Yimpang (North) and Yimlang (South). In the heart of the village, i.e., between Yimpang and Yimlang, the Baptist Church stands, reflecting the dominance of Baptist faith in the everyday life of the village.This Village is considered to be called Soyim because the Ao people first settled here before migrating to various places.

== Demographics ==
In recent years, both Mokokchung and Ungma have grown due to increase in population and have become one continuous settlement. It is a part of the continuous settlements from Amenyong and Khensa in the Northwest and DEF colony in the Northeast through Mokokchung and Ungma up to Alichen in the south. This has resulted in an urban agglomeration that is the third largest in the state.

With a population of 7,189 people (2001 census), Ungma is the third largest Ao village as also the third largest village in Mokokchung District. Prior to this, Ungma enjoyed the privilege of being the largest Ao village as also that of Mokokchung District. However, by 2001 census, Chuchuyimlang and Changki had overtaken Ungma in terms of population. Recent population trend also suggest that Longjang may soon overtake Ungma as the third largest Ao village.

== Culture ==
Almost the entire population is Christian. Christmas and New Year is a time to visit Ungma. The villagers begin to celebrate Christmas from the first week of December and continue until the new year.

== Politics ==
Ungma falls under 26 Aonglenden Assembly Constituency of the Nagaland Legislative Assembly. S. C. Jamir, the ex-Chief Minister of Nagaland (the longest serving chief minister in Nagaland history) and the ex-Governor of Goa & Maharashtra hails from this village. It is partly because of his towering personality that Ungma in particular and Mokokchung District in general has virtually become a bastion of the Indian National Congress Party.

== Attractions ==
Nature Park Ungma is a beautiful park located in the outskirt of the Village. It was built upon a hilltop, a place also known as Tzüdir Yimka. The National Highway 61 (India) is adjacent with the park. Visitors comes here for entertainment varying from family picnics to weddings, seminars and educational tours. It is well maintained and remains open all through the week.

== See also ==
- List of villages in Nagaland
