= Chuchuyimlang =

Village in Nagaland, India

- Village
- Location in Nagaland, India
- Coordinates: 26.458°N 94.639°E
- Country: India
- State: Nagaland
- District: Mokokchung

Government
  - Type: Panchayati raj (India)
  - Body: Gram panchayat

Languages
  - Official: English
- Time zone: UTC+5:30 (IST)
- Vehicle registration: NL
- Website: nagaland.gov.in

Chuchuyimlang is a village in Mokokchung District in the state of Nagaland in Northeast India. The village is divided into four sectors or "mopu", namely Longzung mopu, Teyong mopu, Impang mopu and Imlang Mopu. The "Compound Area" comes under different constituency though it is also a part of Chuchuyimlang village, it is also referred to as "Chuchu Town". The census of 2001 shows that it has overtaken Ungma as the largest Ao village. It lies on National Highway 61, about 30 kilometres (19 mi) from the town of Mokokchung. It is a famous destination for the celebration of Moatsu festival, which showcases cultural performances from various local tribes, including the Konyak, the Chang, and the Phom. It is the only Ao village which invites people from neighbouring trans Dikhu tribes during the festival. Non citizens (of the village) are not allowed in other Ao villages during Moatsu.

The Census of 2001 puts the population of the Chuchuyimlang at 9,524. Out of this 7,846 reside in Chuchuyimlang village while 1,678 reside in Chuchuyimlang Compound.

== Geography and climate ==
In October 2024, the village signed a memorandum of understanding to establish a 200 hectares (490 acres) forest reserve, created in part to boost ecotourism in the village.

The village has been impacted by multiple cyclonic storms in the 21st century.

== Demographics ==
Chuchuyimlang is predominantly inhabited by the Ao.

== Tourism ==
It is a famous destination for the celebration of Moatsu festival, which showcases cultural performances from various local tribes, including the Konyak, the Chang, and the Phom. Within the village, a set of six stones believed to be from where the Ao tribe emerged attracts visitors.

== See also ==
- Natwar Thakkar, person who established first Gandhi Ashram in Nagaland in Chuchuyimlang village
