= Mokokchung Village =

- village
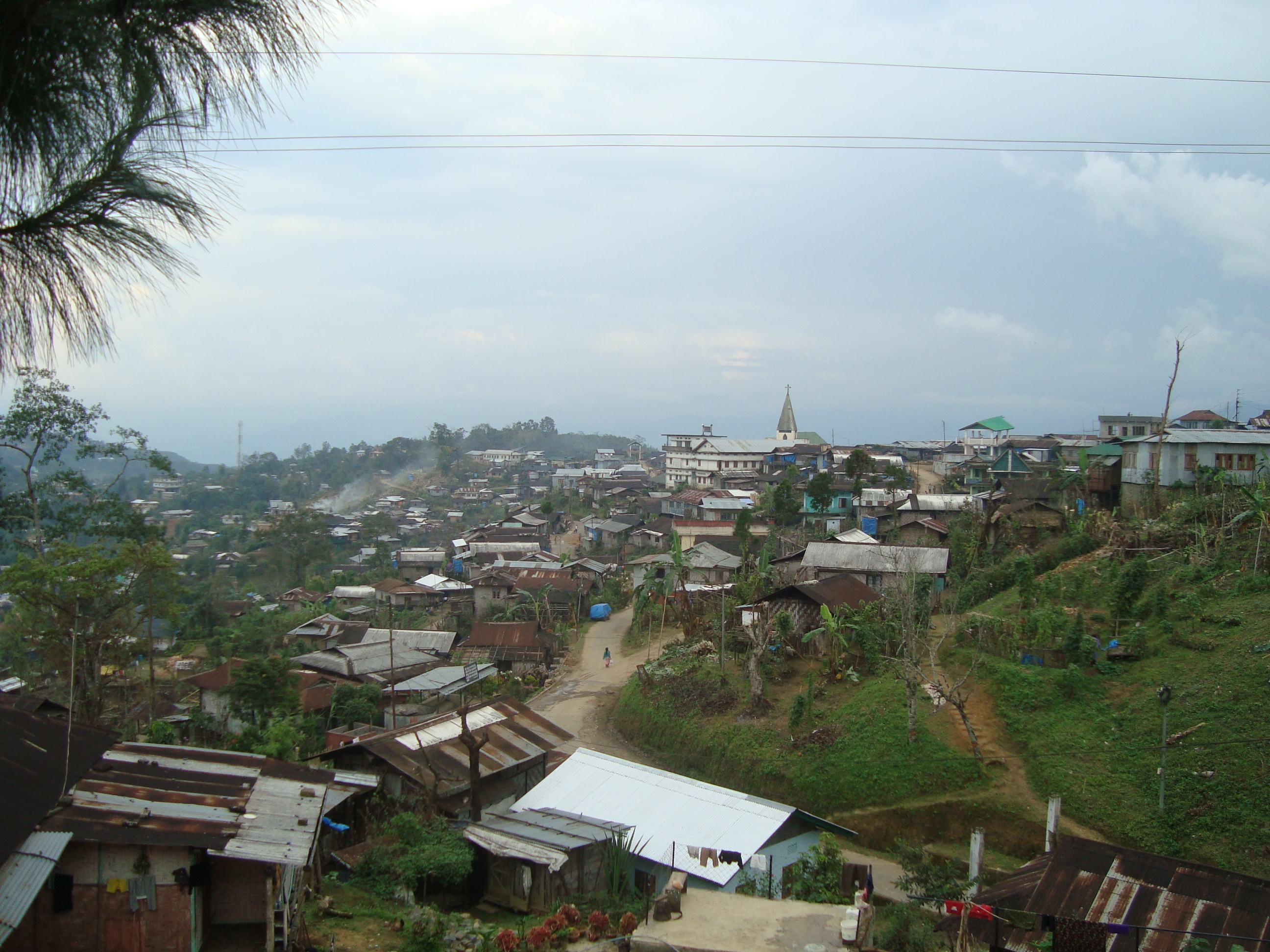
- A view of Mokokchung Village
- Interactive map of Mokokchung Village
- Coordinates: 26°19′35.18″N 94°31′54.43″E
- Country: India
- State: Nagaland
- District: Mokokchung
- Elevation: 1,350 m (4,430 ft)
- Time zone: IST

Mokokchung Village, a village in Mokokchung district is an ancient village in the former Naga Hills, Nagaland, India. According to the folklores, the Ao Nagas emerged from ‘six stones’. These stones symbolise their forefathers and that location is named as ‘Longterok’ which means six stones. These stones are still intact at Chungliyimti in Tuensang district. From this village, the Ao tribe moved towards northern region crossing a river named Tzüla and settled at Soyim, also known as Ungma today. This was the first Ao Village ever known. After a few centuries, a group of people moved further to the north-east of Soyim and settled at a place named as Mokokchung, or today’s Mokokchung village. Many other Ao Naga villages came into being when people migrated out from this village including Ungma in the later part.

== Derivation of the Name ==
Mokokchung is the construction of Mokok and Chung, where Mokok means unwillingly and Chung means a group of people. Thus, the name Mokokchung would refer to a group of people who unwillingly departed from their settlement.

The founders of Mokokchung village were from Soyim. The Soyim people were requesting these founders not to go away from Soyim and had insisted them to stay together, but they did not listen and went away.

== Demography ==
Racially the Ao Nagas are Mongolians, therefore all Mokokchung villagers are Mongolians and is believed to have migrated from the far east 'through' Chungliyimti. There are five clans within the village --- Pongener, Longkumer, Jamir, Atsongchanger and Kechutzar. Marriage within the same clan are prohibited and monogamy is practised. Each clan is treated equally.

The village is divided into two khels (or sectors) – the upper khel and the lower khel. Although this division is normally based on the Ao dialect("Mongsen" and "Jungli") spoken by the people in other Ao villages, the case is different in Mokokchung Village. Both the khels speak only "Mongsen" dialect.

The average lifespan of Mokokchung villagers is 85–90 years. As of today (April'2014), the oldest person in the village is a 108-year-old lady named Mrs. Kashila and she still moves without anybody’s support.

Total population as per the (ongoing) census of 2010 is 9450 and there are 1194 buildings with 1470 households in the village.

== Location ==
Mokokchung village is adjacent to Mokokchung town, at an altitude of about 1350 metres above sea level – at the highest point, Mongsen Salang – which bears the longitude 94º31.9072 E and latitude 26º19.5864 N.

The temperature does not rise beyond 32 °C, and average summer temperature is 27 °C. In summer about 2500mm of rainfall is there from June to August.

== Village Administration system ==
Mokokchung Village is a recognized village under Nagaland State (India). Village administration is under the customary laws, which is approved by Government under the Nagaland Village and Area Councils Act, 1978. This village council is called the ‘Putu Menden’ and its council members are not contested but nominated from each clan for a period of thirty years. The chief of the council is not hereditary but elected by its members.

== Religion & Modernization ==
The Aos are religious and believe in life here-after. They had principles of worship pattern but not in systematic order, nor in written script. These rites were conducted by two priestly clans, Pongener for the Chungli khel and Atsongchanger for the Mongsen khel. In 1872, these highlanders and former head-hunters were influenced by the Christian missionaries under the American Foreign Baptist Mission. Reverend Edward Winter Clark of Boston, USA was the first white man to arrive into Naga soil, and Christianity was received. The first Christian convert from Mokokchung Village was in 1910, and a Church was established. Modern school came along with the Church in 1926 after the British colonizers had chosen this town as their administrative unit in 1890.

== Culture and lifestyle ==
The main annual festivals that were popular in the past are the Moatsü and the Tsungremong. The Moatsü festival is celebrated on 2 May in honour of Lijaba, – the creator of the whole earth – to appeal for his blessings in the cultivation that immediately follows after the sowing season. The Tsungremong festival – a celebration for harvesting – is held during the 1st week of August. In the modern times Christmas has become the most important festival along with all the Ao regions.

== Bibliography ==
- Clark, Mrs.Mary Mead (1907) A Corner in India, American Baptist Foreign Mission.
- Mills, J.P (1923) The Ao Nagas, Oxford university press.
- Alemchiba, M (1970) A Brief Historical Account of Nagaland, Naga Institute of Culture, Kohima.
- Majumdar, Surenthra Nath (1924) The Ao Nagas, Men in India, Vol.4.
