= J.S. Bandukwala =

Indian human rights activist (1945–2022)

- Bandukwala being awarded the Indira Gandhi award for national integration for 2006
- Born: March 27, 1945; Bombay, India
- Died: January 29, 2022 (aged 76); Vadodara, India
- Occupation: Activist

J.S. Bandukwala (27 March 1945 – 29 January 2022) was an Indian human rights activist.

== Early life and education ==
Juzar Saleh (J.S.) Bandukwala was born in Bombay (now Mumbai) on 27 March 1945. He obtained a degree in physics from Bombay University before completing his doctoral studies in nuclear physics from the University of Oklahoma in the United States.

== Career ==
Bandukwala taught physics at the M S University of Baroda and was elected president of its teachers' union in 1981.

He was vocal about the rights of marginalized groups. He worked tirelessly against the ghettoization of Muslims which included fighting against the displacement of Kalyannagar slum communities. He had led a struggle for their rehabilitation since 2015.

His house was burnt down during the 2002 communal violence in Gujarat.

Bandukwala also devoted his life to spreading the education among Muslims. He created and was the lifetime president of the Zidni Ilma Charitable Trust. Through this trust he raised money to fund the education of 400 underprivileged children every year.

He was an active member of the People’s Union of Civil Liberties.

He was presented with the Indira Gandhi award for national integration for 2006 by then Prime Minister of India, Manmohan Singh.

== Death ==
Bandukwala died on 29 January 2022 in Vadodara at the age of 77. He was survived by a son and daughter, who are both settled in the United States. His funeral service took place at the Kalyannagar mosque in Vadodara.

== Legacy ==
The Zidni Ilma Charitable Trust opened a Library cum Reading room in memory of Bandukwala in the old city area of Vadodara.
