= Kasturba Gandhi National Memorial Trust =

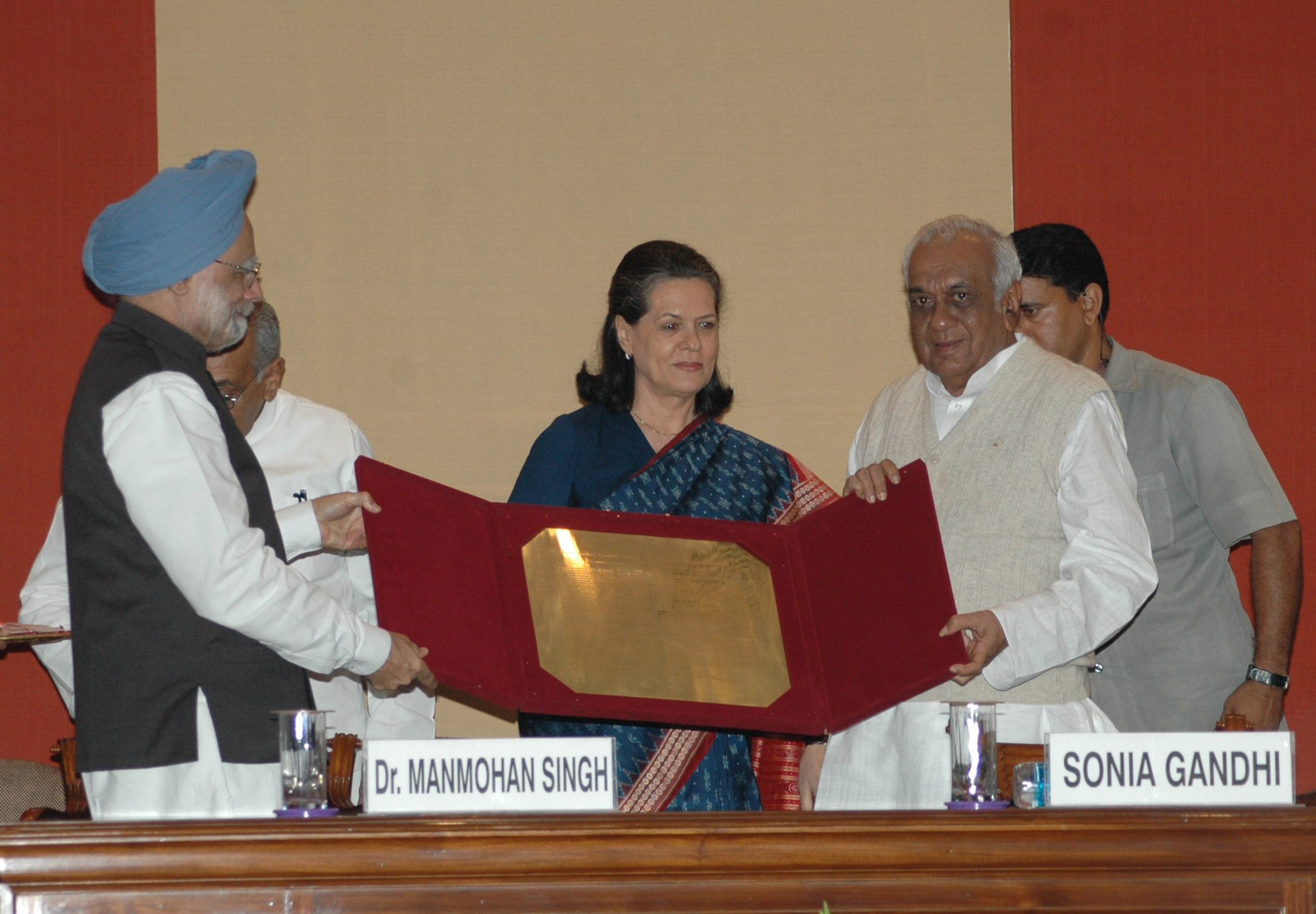
The Prime Minister, Dr. Manmohan Singh presenting the 23rd Indira Gandhi Award for National Integration, in New Delhi on October 31, 2008

The Kasturba Gandhi National Memorial Trust is an organisation dedicated to the development of women and children in rural India. It was founded by Mahatma Gandhi in 1945 in dedication to his deceased wife Kasturba Gandhi. It has its headquarters in Kasturbagram, Indore, Madhya Pradesh. It has branches in 22 Indian States and focuses on health care, education, vocational training and employment. In 2008, the Government of India conferred the Indira Gandhi Award for National Integration upon the trust.

== Chairpersons ==
List of chairpersons of the Trust:

- 1944–1948 Mahatma Gandhi
- 1948–1950 Vallabhbhai Patel
- 1951–1951 Thakkar Bapa
- 1951–1956 Ganesh Vasudev Mavalankar
- 1956–1972 Premlila Vithaldas Thackersey
- 1972–1985 Lakshmi N. Menon
- 1985–1988 Maniben Patel
- 1988–2001 Sushila Nayyar
- 2001–2013 Dhirubhai Mehta
- 2013-2016 Tara Gandhi Bhattacharjee
- 2016- present Karunakar Trivedi

== See also ==
- Shakuntala Choudhary
