= Yimyu =

- town
- Location in Nagaland, India
- Coordinates: 26.3356°N 94.502°E
- Country: India
- State: Nagaland
- District: Mokokchung

Languages
  - Official: English
- Time zone: UTC+5:30 (IST)
- Vehicle registration: NL
- Website: nagaland.gov.in

Yimyu is one of the 15 wards that make up Mokokchung town in India. It is an extensive area and forms the northwestern part of Mokokchung. Until 2003, Yimyu was a separate town and not under Mokokchung Municipal Council. However the last two decades has seen the gradual expansion of the settlements of both Yimyu and Mokokchung and had become a continuous settlement area. In 2003, Yimyu was formally incorporated as part of Mokokchung town. The Mariani-Mokokchung Highway passes through this ward. Mokokchung District Jail and DIET College are located here.

== Location ==
Yimyu is situated in the North-West side of Mokokchung District about three kilometers from the heart of Mokokchung Town. Kubolong bound it in the North, Alichen and Longkum in the South, Mokokchung Village in the North-East and Aliba and Kinunger in the West. It is a narrow strip of mountainous territory between Mokokchung town and Khensa village. Ongpangkong Compound falls under the jurisdiction of Khensa village but they have a separate administration council under the chairmanship of Extra Assistant Commissioner(EAC) of Ongpangkong range. Yimyu is located at an altitude of about 1100 metres above sea level.

== History ==
There are many stories behind the name Yimyu, and many suggested meanings. First, Yimyu is derived from the word "Yimyu Langjem" meaning 'meeting place'. 'Yim' means 'village', 'Yu' means 'word' and 'Langjem' means 'decide'. It is said that there was a dispute between Khensa village and Settsu village, and it was at this particular place that the Khensa villagers met to discuss their strategies and plans with their rival. Second, the bird Oyim once flew across this place and it was called Yimyu, which means the Oyim flew over this land. Third, the term Yimyu is derived from the Phom Naga dialect. Today it has been altered to YimYu Ward Ongpangkong because this is the central place for Ongpangkong range among 16 villages. The decision to alter the name was made by all the 16 villages that fall under the jurisdiction of Ongpangkong range.
