= Imkongliba Ao =

Naga leader

President of the Naga People's Convention
- In office October 1959 – 22 August 1961
- Preceded by: Office Established

Personal details
- Died: 22 August 1961 Mokokchung, Nagaland (Union Territory) (Now in Nagaland, India)

Imkongliba Ao (died 22 August 1961) was a Naga leader and a key figure in the movement for the statehood of Nagaland within the Republic of India and the resistance movement against Assamisation.

== Career ==
Ao played a pivotal role in the resistance against the Assamisation of Naga Hills and the fight for the separation of Nagaland from the province of Assam. Prior to his rise to prominence, conflict between the NNC and government of India had led to mass insurgency and human rights violations. Through the formation of the Naga People's Convention, he resisted the economic suppression and militarization imposed by the Indian army, which included burning, grouping, and re-location of villages. The struggle and sacrifices of these pioneers granted the Nagas an identity and status.

In 1959, Ao served as the President of the third Naga People's Convention (NPC) held in Mokokchung. During this convention, a demand was formulated for the constitution of Naga Hills as a full-fledged new state, to be named Nagaland, with provisions for autonomy to safeguard Naga interests. This demand caught the Indian government by surprise and presented a challenge to the integration policy with Assam.

=== Establishment of Nagaland ===
Recognizing the democratic urges of a reasonable section of the Nagas, Prime Minister Jawaharlal Nehru moved the Indian Parliament in August 1960 to constitute Nagaland as a new state. The establishment of Nagaland was a response to the demand presented by the Naga People's Convention under Ao's leadership. This decision marked a significant step towards the preservation of Naga identity within the Indian Union.

Despite opposition from Naga secessionists, the creation of Nagaland as the 16th state of the Indian Union laid a foundation for autonomy under Article 371(A) of the Constitution. This period also saw the inclusion of eastern Naga areas from the NEFA Division into Nagaland, causing concern among Assamese politicians about Assam’s potential disintegration.

== Death and legacy ==
Ao was assassinated on August 22, 1961, at Mokokchung, likely by the NNC. His contributions to the peaceful development of Nagaland were overshadowed by subsequent events, and his legacy often went unrecognized.

The contributions of Ao are commemorated on August 22–24 annually. Various leaders, including the Governor of Nagaland, recognized his leadership and the role he played in shaping the history of Nagaland in 2023. In 2021, Nagaland Governor R.N. Ravi paid tribute, acknowledging Ao's extraordinary courage, strategic foresight, and role in uniting the Naga family. The Governor emphasized the need to build a "Nagaland of Dr. Ao’s dream".
