= Fazl Ali College =

College in Nagaland

Coordinates: 26°19′54.8″N 94°33′10.6″E

- Motto: Academic Nulli Secundus (Latin)
- Motto in English: Second to None in Academics
- Established: 1959; 67 years ago
- Affiliations: Nagaland University
- Principal: Dr I Wati Imchen
- Location: Mokokchung, Nagaland, India
- Campus: Urban
- Website: www.fac.ac.in

Fazl Ali College is a higher educational institution located in Mokokchung, Nagaland. Inaugurated on 8 September 1959, Fazl Ali College is the oldest and one of the leading colleges in Nagaland.

== History ==
The college was first set up as a private college through the initiative of people such as S.C. Jamir, R.C. Chiten, T. Aonok, Dr. Longri, Imlong Chang, Khelhoshe, Mayangnokcha and few other citizens of Mokokchung. The college made its beginning by sharing the building of Government School, now known as Mayangnokcha Government School and later moved to what is now known as the old Town Hall of Mokokchung. In 1969 it was shifted to its present campus which is about 5 km from the heart of the town. Since its modest start with just 2 rooms, 43 students and 3 lecturers, the college has continued to grow in strength. The government took over the college in 1962. The science stream was introduced in 1983 with up-gradation to B.Sc in 1999.

== Academics ==
There are 13 departments (Arts and Science together) with Honours offered in 12 subjects. A special feature is the introduction of Functional English, with assistance from the UGC since the year 2001. This is a vocational subject and is so far offered only in this college in the entire Northeast India. Under the directive and assistance of the then department of Higher and Technical Education, Nagaland, the Career Guidance and Counseling Cell has also become operational.

== Motto ==
Its motto is Academic Nulli Secundus (Second to None).
