= P. Shilu Ao =

Indian politician

1st Chief Minister of Nagaland
- In office 1 December 1963 – 14 August 1966
- Governor: Vishnu Sahay
- Preceded by: Office Established
- Succeeded by: T. N. Angami
- Constituency: Impur

Personal details
- Born: P. Shilu Ao; 24 December 1916 Longjang, Naga Hills District, Assam Province, British India (Now in Mokokchung District, Nagaland, India)
- Died: 19 September 1988 (aged 71) Mokokchung, Mokokchung District, Nagaland, India
- Party: Naga People's Convention, Naga Nationalist Organisation
- Education: Cotton University, Gauhati University

P. Shilu Ao (24 December 1916 – 19 September 1988) was an Indian politician who was involved in the negotiations leading to the creation of Nagaland, in the north-eastern part of India, as one of the states and territories of India in December 1963. Ao then served as the first Chief Minister of Nagaland until August 1966. Ao played a part in persuading the Indian Government and the Lok Sabha to grant Nagaland separate statehood but was not able to reconcile with many Naga nationalists, who regarded him and his party as stooges of the central government.

== Early life ==
Ao was born in the Longjang village of the district of Mokokchung to Metongchiba Pongen and Melungnenla Imchen on 24 December 1916. He was schooled at the Impur Mission School where he passed his class VI in 1st division in 1934, and did his matriculation from Jorhat Mission School in 1st Division which was also regarded as one of the biggest achievements of his time and later completed his Intermediate Arts and a bachelor's degree in Arts in year 1952 and a law degree from the Cotton College, Guwahati and Guwahati University. He also served as a primary school teacher in the year 1939 and 1940 at his native village of Longjang on monthly salary of Rs 10. He later taught at Impur Mission School from 1941 to 1947 after his Intermediate education. He also pursued and completed his Bachelor of Teaching from Shillong in year 1953. Like the majority of Naga people, he was a Christian and was Chairman/President of the Ao Christian Mungdang (ABAM) Platinum Jubilee Celebration in year 1946. He then worked as a school teacher, as a headmaster and the Inspector of Schools at Kohima from year 1948 to year 1949. Having joined the administrative service of Assam in 1954, Ao served as an assistant commissioner and first-class magistrate with the Government of Assam from 1954 to 1960. He also served as Pastor-in-Charge of Kohima Ao Baptist Church from year 1948 to year 1949. In the year 1950 to 1952 he also served as Headmaster of Government Middle School, Wokha. He served under Government of Assam as EAC cum First Class Magistrate during years 1954 to 1960.

== Career ==
=== Politics ===
In 1960, Ao resigned from government service and entered politics, joining the Naga People's Convention (NPC). The Naga-inhabited regions of Assam had been racked by insurgency ever since India's independence in 1947 with the Naga National Council under Angami Zapu Phizo calling for Naga independence from India. The Convention, established in 1954, however, took a moderate stance calling for the establishment of a separate administrative unit within Assam by merging the Tuensang division of North-East Frontier Agency (NEFA) with the Naga Hills District of Assam. The Government of India agreed to this demand in 1957, creating the Naga Hills and Tuensang Area. In 1960, Jawaharlal Nehru met an NPC delegation, and the Government of India and the NPC signed a 16-point resolution, which called for the establishment of a state of Nagaland. Nehru announced the acceptance of this resolution in Parliament on 1 August 1960. Ao was part of the NPC team that drafted the resolution and met with Nehru and was one of the signatories of the accord reached between the Nagas and the Indian government.

=== Chief Minister ===
In February 1961, under the Nagaland Regulation Act, a 42-member Interim Body with a five-member Executive Council was set up with Ao as the Chief Executive Councillor. Under the Nagaland Act of 1962 the state of Nagaland with its capital at Kohima came into being on 1 December 1963 and the process of conversion of Naga Hills district of Assam to Nagaland took place. He worked for the welfare of the Naga people in the midst of tremendous hurdles. In the first state elections of Nagaland in the year 1964 he was elected from Impur Assembly constituency as member of Legislative Assembly. The Interim Body and the Executive Council became the Nagaland Legislative Assembly and the Nagaland Cabinet and a five-member ministry with Ao as the first Chief Minister was sworn in by Vishnu Sahay, the Governor of Assam and Nagaland the same day. Ao served as leader of the house of the Nagaland Assembly for 5 years from 1961 to 1966 and as Chief Minister of Nagaland from 1 December 1963, to 14 August 1966, during which time he also led the Naga Nationalist Organisation (NNO) to victory in the first Nagaland Assembly elections of 1964.

Ao's government passed a resolution in 1964 calling for the integration of all Naga inhabited regions with Nagaland and in May 1964 a ceasefire agreement was concluded between the Naga insurgents and the Government of India which was formally declared on 6 September 1966. Ao had attended the negotiations only as an observer on the government side, as the insurgents refused to recognize his state government. The same year, he also survived an assassination attempt. Although the NNO held an absolute majority in the Nagaland Legislative Assembly following the elections of 1964, Ao's government was voted out in a no-confidence motion introduced in the Assembly in August 1966. Following Ao's ouster, he was succeeded by his NNO colleague and Speaker of the house T.N. Angami as Chief Minister.

In 1969, Ao contested the Impur constituency seat as an Independent. He lost to the sitting MLA M. Koramoa Jamir of the Naga Nationalist Organisation by 162 votes.

=== Commissions ===
Following his resignation as Chief Minister, Ao was appointed chairman of the National Commission for Scheduled Castes and Scheduled Tribes in 1966. He headed a committee set up by the Planning Commission to appraise the functioning of tribal development programs in the Third Five Year Plan. The committee made several recommendations on tribal welfare policy, classification of tribes and on protective and administrative measures for tribal communities. In subsequent elections to the Nagaland Legislative Assembly, Ao performed poorly, but he remained a senior party leader of the opposition United Front of Nagaland for several years.

== Death ==
Ao died at Mokokchung on 19 September 1988, following a prolonged period of ill health, and was buried with state honors two days later at his native village, Longjang, in the Mokokchung district. As head of the NPC, Ao enabled Naga politics to adapt to and adopt successfully the Indian parliamentary democratic model of governance, despite problems with insurgent groups continuing. In 2004, J B Jasokie, a former Chief Minister of Nagaland revealed that he had voluntarily stepped aside to allow Ao to become the state's first chief minister on account of the latter's seniority and perfect understanding, despite having won more votes among the legislators than Ao.
