= L. Kijungluba Ao =

Baptist missionary from Nagaland, India

Padma Shri The Reverend L. Kijungluba Ao
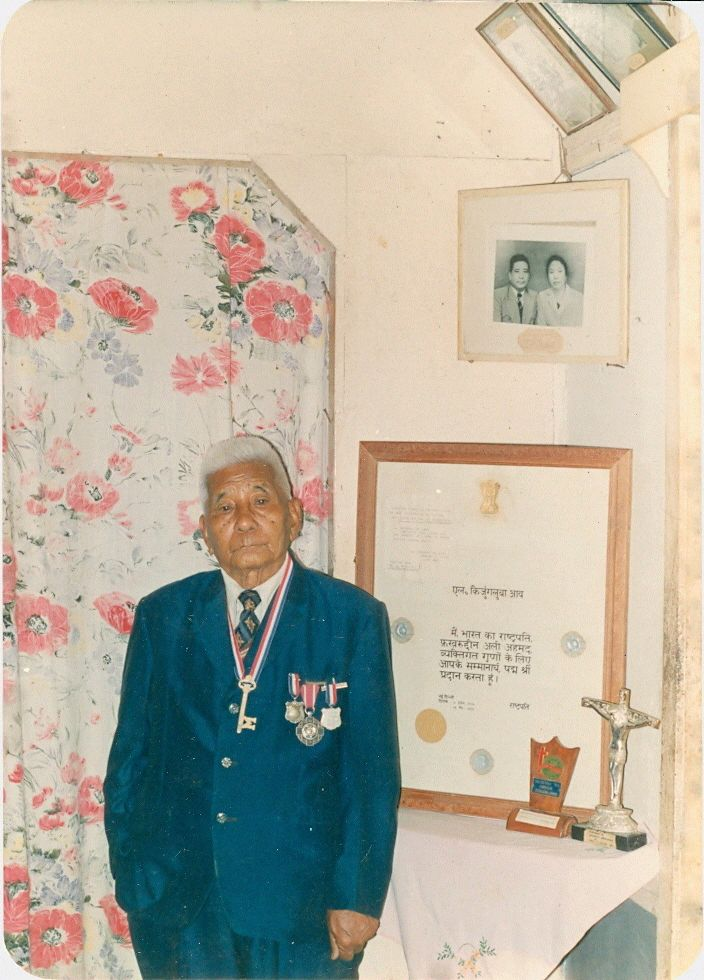
- Born: 8 February 1906; Lirmen, Naga Hills District, Assam Province, British India (Now Lirmen, Mokokchung District, Nagaland, India)
- Died: 22 January 1997 (aged 90)
- Awards: Padma Shri Award (1976)

L. Kijungluba (8 February 1906 – 22 January 1997) was the first Baptist missionary from Nagaland. He was born in Lirmen Village, Mokokchung District, Nagaland, India.

== Life ==
He was field director of Ao Naga Baptist Association, Nagaland, India. In this position he supervised the work of the churches of the Ao Naga tribes in Northeast India, a responsibility formerly held by American missionaries. An American missionary characterized him as "the elder statesman" of the Naga Christians.

Kijungluba attended Jorhat Christian High School in Jorhat and was a pastor and evangelist among his people for many years. He was president of the Council of Baptist Churches of Northeast India. He also served in official positions on the Assam Christian Council and attended all India Christian gatherings. He played a relatively unknown role in reconciliation during the difficulties caused by the revolutionary movement in Nagaland. He was consulted by Nehru himself as reported by The Daily Notes (Canonsburg, Pennsylvania 10 April 1963). For his role during the turbulent times he was awarded Edwin T. Dahlberg Peace award of the American Baptist Convention for 1965. He was awarded the Padma Shri Award, India's fourth highest civilian award in 1976 for his contribution to the social work.
