= Premlila Vithaldas Thackersey =

Indian educationist

- Born: 1894
- Died: 1977 (aged 82–83)
- Occupation: Educationist
- Awards: Padma Vibhushan (1975)

Premlila Vithaldas (1894–1977), known as Lady Thackersey, was an Indian educationist and Gandhian.

She was the wife of educationist and philanthropist Sir Vithaldas Thackersey. When her husband died in 1925, she was 31 years old, yet continued his work, both in the field of education and philanthropy and dedicated herself to the cause of women's education. She remained the chairperson of the Kasturba Gandhi National Memorial Trust (1956-1972), and also became the first Vice-Chancellor of SNDT Women's University in Mumbai.

She was awarded the Padma Vibhushan, India's second highest civilian honour given by Government of India in 1975, for her contribution in the field of education.
