= Indira Gandhi Award for National Integration =

Award granted by the Indian National Congress

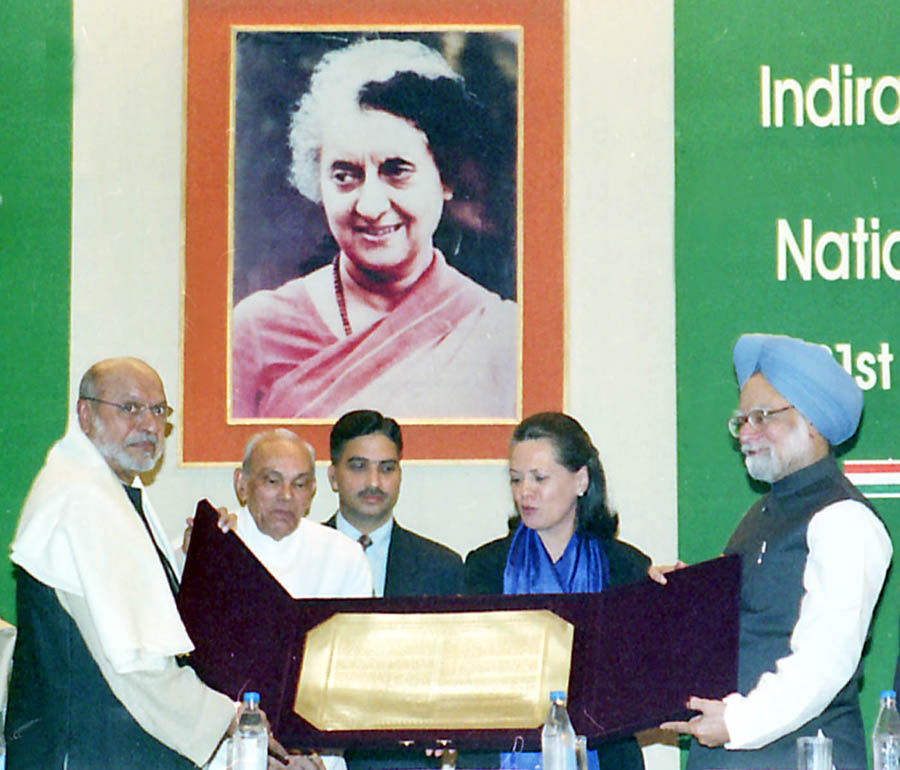
Prime Minister Dr. Manmohan Singh giving away the Indira Gandhi Award for National Integration to filmmaker Shyam Benegal in New Delhi on October 31, 2004

The Indira Gandhi Award for National Integration is an award accorded by the Indian National Congress, after Indira Gandhi, a former Prime Minister of India. The award is given annually, starting from 1985, to distinguished persons/institutions for promoting national integration and understanding and fellowship amongst religious groups, communities, ethnic groups, cultures, languages and traditions of India and the strengthening, through thought and action of the nation's sense of solidarity. The Awardee is selected by an Advisory Committee of eminent persons representing art, science, culture, education, literature, religion, social work, journalism, law and public life. The Award carries an amount of 5 lakh rupees in cash and a citation. The Award is given on the Martyr's Day. The Award is given for services deserving of recognition in the year to which the Award relates and two years immediately preceding it.

== Recipients ==
The Award has so far been given to: Aruna Asaf Ali, P. N. Haksar, M. S. Subbulakshmi (1990), Rajiv Gandhi (posthumous), Paramdham Ashram (Wardha, Maharashtra), Acharya Tulsi (1993), Beant Singh (posthumous) and Natwar Thakkar (jointly), Gandhi Institute of Public Affairs (Karnataka), Indira Gandhi Centre for National Integration (Shanti Niketan), A. P. J. Abdul Kalam, Shankar Dayal Sharma (posthumous), Satish Dhawan, H. Y. Sharada Prasad, Ram-Rahim Nagar Slum Dwellers Association (Ahmedabad), Aaman Pathik Peace Volunteer Group (Ahmedabad), Ram Sinh Solanki and Sunil Tamaiche (jointly).

- 1987: Swami Ranganathananda (1987), The Bharat Scouts and Guides (1987)
- 1988: Rafique Alam (1988)
- 1996: Bishambhar Nath Pande (1996)
- 2002: Acharya Mahaprajna
- 2003: Shyam Benegal
- 2004: Mahashweta Devi
- 2005: Javed Akhtar
- 2006: Dr. J. S. Bandukwala and Ram Puniyani (jointly)
- 2008: Kasturba Gandhi National Memorial Trust
- 2009: Balraj Puri
- 2010: A. R. Rahman and Ramakrishna Mission Ashram (jointly)
- 2011: Mohan Dharia
- 2012: Gulzar
- 2013: M. S. Swaminathan
- 2014: Rajagopal P. V.
- 2015: T. M. Krishna
- 2016: T. M. Krishna
- 2017: Chandi Prasad Bhatt
- 2018: Chandi Prasad Bhatt
- 2019: Chandi Prasad Bhatt
