= Vithaldas Thackersey =

Indian businessman

Sir Vithaldas Damodar Thackersey (30 November 1873 – 12 August 1922) was an Indian businessman from Bombay state and was a member of Imperial Council of India during the 1900s.

He chaired the Industrial Conference, a subsidiary conference of Indian National Congress, in Kolkata in 1903

The vision of Maharashi Karve and the foresight of Sir Vithaldas Thackersey led to the establishment of the first women’s university in India. Recognizing the pioneering work of Karve, Thackersey made a generous contribution of Rs. 15 lakh to commemorate the memory of his mother, Nathibai. In 1920 the university was named Shreemati Nathibai Damodar Thackersey Women’s University SNDT Women's University . He was knighted by the British Government in 1908.

After her husband died, Premkunver, Lady Thakersey (Premlila Thakersey) continued his work in the fields of education and philanthropy. She was dedicated to women's education specifically and ultimately became the first vice-chancellor of SNDT Women’s University in Mumbai. Lady Premlila Thakersey also continued her husband's work by generously donating to establish the degree college in Home Science. This donation is what started Sir Vithaldas Thakersey College of Home Science in 1959.
