= Impur =

- Town
- Nickname: Jerusalem of Nagaland
- Location in Nagaland, India
- Coordinates: 26.390101°N 94.548634°E
- Country: India
- State: Nagaland
- District: Mokokchung
- Founder: Dr. E. W. Clark

Government
  - Type: Theocratic Council Committee
  - Body: Ao Baptist Arogo Mungdang

Languages
  - Official: English
- Time zone: UTC+5:30 (IST)
- Vehicle registration: NL
- Website: nagaland.gov.in

Impur is a town and an assembly constituency in Nagaland, India. It was established as a mission centre in 1894 by Dr. E. W. Clark an American missionary. In 1897, when the Ao Baptist Arogo Mungdang (Ao Baptist Church Association) was formed, it became its headquarters and continues to do so till date. It is 15 kilometres away from the heart of Mokokchung town. It is also the Headquarters of Ao churches (ABAM) in Nagaland which has about 159 churches under its fold. It has a higher secondary school, an hospital and a church. It is surrounded by the Mopongchuket and Süngratsü villages.
