= P. Kilemsungla =

Indian educationist (born 1951)

- Born: 1 March 1951 (age 74); Nagaland, India
- Education: M.A.(Education), Ph.D. (Teacher Education) NEHU 2002
- Awards: Padma Shri

P. Kilemsungla is an Indian educationist. She hails from Kohima, Nagaland. She is the first woman from Nagaland to be appointed as member of the Union Public Service Commission. She has been selected for Padma Shri for her contribution in the field of literature and education.

Before being appointed as member of UPSC, she had served as a member of Nagaland Public Service Commission (NPSC) between 1 February 2007 and 12 September 2012 and also worked as acting chairperson of NPSC from 13 September 2012 till her retirement on 31 January. Kilemsungla, a noted educationist, has been a lecturer in Kohima Arts College and also taught at the Nagaland College of Teachers Education (NCTE). She was also Principal of District Institute of Educational Training, Government Polytechnic and then NCTE, Kohima.
