= Naga People's Convention =

Statehood discussions in 1957, 1958 and 1959

The Naga People's Convention, one of the principal instruments of statehood demand, has a historical significance for Naga history.

There are three Naga People's Conventions. The first Naga People's Convention (NPC) was convened in Kohima on August 22–26, 1957, the second convention took place in Mokokchung district on May 21–23, 1958, and the third was held in Mokokchung on October 22–26, 1959.

== Formation ==
Initially, the deputy director of the Indian Intelligence Bureau (I.B.), S.M. Dutt, convened a meeting of the moderate Naga leaders, in August 1957 and named it the “Working Committee Meeting”. From these meetings onwards the so-called Naga People's Convention was formed having a historic significance in Naga history.

== First Naga People's Convention ==
After the formation of the Naga People's Convention, Imkongliba Ao was elected the President of the Convention and John Bosco Jasokie was elected as Secretary. The initial Convention discussion centred around the first resolution where it resolved that the only answer to the Naga problem was a satisfactory political settlement.

== Second Naga People's Convention ==
The second Convention held in 1957 demanded that the Naga Hills district of Assam and the Tuensang Frontier Division of North-East Frontier Agency (NEFA) be merged into a single unit. The demand later led to the formation of Naga Hills Tuensang Area (NHTA).

In the second sitting of the Naga Peoples’ Convention, one vice-president and one Joint Secretary were elected and they were Vizol Angami and S. C. Jamir respectively. In this meeting, the Liaison Committee was appointed to explore the possibility of agreed solutions of the Naga political instability.

The Select Committee at its meeting at Kohima on the 11th December, 1958, discussed the report submitted by the Liaison Committee and reviewed the situation. The Select Committee after thorough deliberation on the situation in the country, and in the light of the report of various tribes, resolved to appoint a Drafting Committee to prepare a draft for the political Settlement within the purview of the first Naga Peoples’ Convention at Kohima.

== Third Naga People's Convention ==
During the third session of the convention, the Sixteen Points Resolution was adopted making it the basis of negotiation with the Government of India for Naga political settlement. The sixteen-point proposal was placed for approval before the third Naga Peoples’ Convention which met at Mokokchung from 22 to 26 October in 1959.

Dr Imkongliba Ao was one of the most instrumental figures in the drafting of the 16 Point Proposal that culminated in the successful creation of Nagaland state. After deliberation on various recommendations of the committee, the Working Committee was entrusted to select a Negotiating Body and accordingly, the committee had selected around 18 members of the Negotiating Body.

The historic meeting between the then Prime Minister, Jawaharlal Nehru and delegates from Nagaland happened in 1960, 26 July which conducted a thorough study on 16-point Memorandum. The question to replace “Nagaland” with the pure Naga word and the inclusion of the Reserved Forests and contiguous areas inhabited by the Nagas were discussed. But no such better nomenclature alternatives could be given at that point of time. They were referred to the provisions in Articles 3 and 4 of the Constitution, prescribing the procedure for the transfer of areas from one state to another.
