= Chungli Ao language =

Sino-Tibetan language of Nagaland, India

Chungli Ao
- Native to: India
- Region: Nagaland
- Ethnicity: Ao Naga
- Native speakers: 130,004 (2011 census)
- Language family: Sino-Tibetan: Ao languages; Ao language; Chungli Ao
- Writing system: Latin

Language codes
- ISO 639-3: None (mis)
- Glottolog: chon1286
- ELP: Chungli

Chungli or Jungli Ao is the prestige dialect of Ao and it is a Sino-Tibetan language of northeast India. It is the most widely spoken of the Ao languages which also comprise Mongsen Ao and Changki Ao. It is taught up to the tenth grade in schools of the Mokokchung district. It is also spoken by the Ao Nagas of Nagaland, a hill state in northeast India. Being the official language of religion, the dialect has a Bible translation and is used in church services as well as to make public announcements. A local Chungli newspaper, Tir Yimyim, is also published online. The number of speakers who reported Chungli Ao as their mother tongue are approximately 130,000 according to the 2011 census report of India.

== History ==
During the American Baptist Mission to Naga Hills, E. W. Clark first came in contact with the Molungkimong village that paved the way for a common Ao language. Chungli Ao is spoken in Molungkimong and Molungyimsen and other villages throughout Ao territory by roughly 50% of the Ao-speaking population. The speech of Molungkimong is the prestige dialect due to Baptist missionaries' influence. Most Ao can speak Chungli even if they are from Mongsen-speaking regions. Chungli is taught in schools.

== Phonology ==
Chungli Ao phonology has been described in Gowda (1972, 1975), Temsunungsang (2009, 2014, 2021) and Bruhn (2010). Bruhn's description is based on a native speaker of Mongsen Ao who learned Chungli Ao after the age of 9, while Temsunungsang's analysis is based on monolingual Chungli speakers.

=== Vowels ===
Sources do not agree on the amount of vowel phonemes in Chungli Ao. Inventories of four to six vowels have been posited. Bruhn initially posited a six-vowel system but later switched to a four-vowel system.

==== Four-vowel system ====
Temsunungsang posits a four-vowel inventory for Chungli Ao.

	Front	Central	Back	
Close	i		ɯ	u
Mid		(ə)		
Open		a		

/ɯ/ (Temsunungsang's notation; Bruhn notates this as /ə/) varies between [ə] and [ɯ] based on the phonetic environment. Temsunungsang finds that /ɯ/ surfaces as [ə] before non-velar coda consonants and [ɯ], a back vowel, before velar codas and in monosyllabic words consisting of a single open syllable. According to Bruhn, [ɛ] is also found as an allophone of /ə/.

Bruhn states that /u/ varies between [u] and [o]; he has not determined the conditioning of these variants.

==== Six-vowel system ====
Gowda (1975) sets up the following six-vowel inventory:

	Front	Back	
	Front	unrounded	rounded
Close / Near-close	ɪ	ɯ	u
Close-mid	e		o
Open		a	

/e/ is retroflex [ɘ˞] in CVC syllables, [e] otherwise.

/a/ is [ʌ] with a falling tone, [a] otherwise.

/o/ is [ɔ] when adjacent to a velar consonant, [o] otherwise.

There is some indication in the description that the back unrounded vowels may be central. /a/ behaves as a non-back vowel in that it triggers an epenthetic /j/ rather than a /w/.

=== Consonants ===
Different authors have reported varying consonant charts for the language.

Derived from Gowda (1975)
		Bilabial	Alveolar	Retroflex/ Palatal	Velar	Glottal
Nasal		m	n		ŋ	
Plosive		p (Note: /p t k/ are optionally aspirated [pʰ tʰ kʰ] in initial position. They are voiced [b d ɡ] between voiced sounds and [p t k] elsewhere.)	t		k	ʔ
Affricate				cç (Note: A "palatal affricate"; see § Nature of ⟨c⟩ and ⟨s⟩. Gowda describes this as being voiced [ɟʝ] (using the transcription ⟨ǰ⟩, and later ⟨j⟩) between voiced sounds but voiceless elsewhere. It is voiceless alveolar [t͡s] before /ɯ/, even intervocalically.)		
Fricative	voiceless		s (Note: /s/ is palatalized (see § Nature of ⟨c⟩ and ⟨s⟩) before /i/. It is [s] elsewhere.)			(h) (Note: /h/ only occurs in a few interjections, mimetic words and loan words, such as /hàuʔ/ 'yes'.)
Fricative	voiced		z (Note: /z/ only occurs before non-front vowels.)	𝼅 (Note: See § Nature of ⟨r⟩.)		
Approximant		w	l	j		

Derived from Bruhn (2010)
		Bilabial	Dental/ Alveolar	Palatal (-alveolar)	Velar	Glottal
Nasal		m	n		ŋ	
Plosive		p	t		k	ʔ
Affricate			ts	tʃ		
Fricative	voiceless		s			(h)
Fricative	voiced		z			
Approximant	median	w	ɹ	j		
Approximant	lateral		l			

Derived from Temsunungsang (2021)
		Bilabial	Dental	Palatal	Velar	Glottal
Nasal		m	n		ŋ	
Plosive		p	t		k	ʔ
Affricate			[ts] ~ tʃ			
Fricative	voiceless		s ~ [ʃ]			
Fricative	voiced		z			
Sonorant	median	w	r	j		
Sonorant	lateral		l			

==== Nature of ⟨c⟩ and ⟨s⟩ ====
Gowda and Temsunungsang both refer to orthographic ⟨c⟩ as a "palatal affricate" phoneme. Gowda describes the sound as a "voiceless palatal affricate" (/cç/), that is produced by "raising the front of the tongue towards the hard palate", initially using the transcription /č/, with [c] for the allophonic alveolar affricate; he later transcribes these sounds as /c/ and [ts], respectively. Temsunungsang uses the transcriptions /tʃ/ and [ts]. Bruhn transcribes the affricates as [tʃ] and [ts], but treats the sounds as distinct phonemes rather than allophones (which both Gowda and Temsunungsang regard them as), citing the need to verify their complementary distribution; he places them in the consonant chart as "palatal/palato-alveolar" and "dental/alveolar", respectively, without further description.

Gowda, Bruhn, and Temsunungsang all agree on the existence of a palatal or palatalized allophone of /s/ before /i/. Gowda describes this allophone as a "voiceless palatal fricative" ([ç]), and transcribes it as [š]. Bruhn and Temsunungsang transcribe it as [ʃ].

==== Nature of ⟨r⟩ ====
The phonetic value of orthographic ⟨r⟩ varies among reports on the language. Gowda describes the sound as a "voiced retroflex lateral fricative" (/𝼅/ in extIPA), produced by having the blade of the tongue turned back toward the hard palate, with the air producing friction when it passes between the tongue and the palate, and then passing freely over the sides of the tongue; as a designated symbol for the sound did not exist at the time, he provides the transcription /ḷʰ/, using the obsolete dot below diacritic for retroflexion and the superscript ⟨ʰ⟩ to indicate fricative quality. Temsunungsang simply calls it a "flap" (/ɾ/), as well as a "rhotic", which he transcribes as /r/, and places in the dental column of the consonant chart. Bruhn transcribes it as /ɹ/, placing it in the consonant chart as a "dental/alveolar approximant", without further description.

=== Phonotactics ===
Ao syllables may be CVC, where either C may be a cluster of two consonants. Word-initially, the only consonant clusters are /t𝼅/ and /p𝼅/. Word-finally, and excluding cases of -VwC and -VyC, the only clusters are /ʔk/ and /lʔ/. Word-medially, other sequences occur, with the most complex being /𝼅tp𝼅/. Another medial cluster not predictable from the preceding is /ʔnc͡ç/.

=== Tones ===
Chungli Ao has three register tones: mid, low high. High is restricted, normally occurring only before low as a falling tone. There are also high-low and low-mid contour tones on single syllables. On disyllabic words, the most common tone patters are MM and HL, with LL and LM less common. ML and HH are very rare / marginal, except in that ML and HL may vary allophonically depending on the casualness of speech. These facts suggest that at least most apparently high tones are actually mid tones upstepped before a low tone.

== Grammar ==
Published grammars of Chungli Ao include Clark (1893) and Gowda (1975). Some notes on verb morphology are also corroborated by Bruhn (2009).

=== Verb morphology ===
Chungli Ao verbs are agglutinative, but lack person and number marking. Tense–aspect–mood distinctions are marked by various verbal suffixes.

Bruhn provides the following verb template:

Chungli Ao verb template (Bruhn)
Prefix	Stem	Lexical suffix	Derivational suffix	Inflectional suffix
me- (negative) te- (prohibitive)	stem of verb	-maʔ ‘completely’ -et 'persistently' etc.	-tsɨʔ BEN -tep RECIP etc.	-tsɨ (irrealis) -əɹ (present) etc.

==== Tense, aspect and mood marking ====
Chungli Ao verbs are marked for three tenses, namely the present, past, and future. Certain combinations of tense and aspect are also marked.

The past tense is unmarked, or rather it is expressed by the absence of any endings on the bare verb stem. Thus, bare verb stems like aru "to come" and jaja "to walk" actually mean "came" and "walked", respectively.

The perfect is marked with the suffix -ogo /uku/. Clark and Gowda specify that this is a past perfect while Bruhn labels this as a present perfect.

The simple present tense is marked with the suffix -er. Clark and Gowda do not agree on the allomorphy of this suffix when applied to verbs ending in vowels. Clark states that the suffixal vowel generally disappears if the preceding stem ends in a vowel, while Gowda only has the suffix vowel disappear after /a u o/. After /ɯ i/, Gowda states that a glide /j/ separates the vowels of the stem and suffix.

The present progressive (or immediate present in Bruhn's description) is marked by either /-taki/ (spelled -dage in Clark's grammar) or -dar /-taɹ/. The choice between the two endings, which are perfectly equivalent, varies by village.

A pair of forms suffixed with -a and /-i/ are called "present participles" in Clark's grammar and mark "durative aspect" in Gowda's grammar. The -a form is used in non-negative sentences while the /-i/ form is used in negative sentences.

The future tense is marked with -tsü [tsɯ]. An alternative near-future marker -di also exists. This ending -tsü also marks what Clark and Gowda call an infinitive which is instead labelled by Bruhn as irrealis.

The imperative mood is marked with the suffix -ang. The vowel in this suffix is lost if the preceding stem ends in /u/ or /a/.

==== Negative prefixes ====
To negate a verb, the verb is prefixed with ma- outside of the imperative. According to Gowda, ma- surfaces as me- before consonants. In the imperative, te- is used instead for negation. The vowel in the negative prefixes is lost when the following verb stem begins in a.

=== Noun morphology ===
2) The following table shows the case marking present in Chungli Ao.

Case marking
×	Agentive case	Instrumental case	Allative case	Ablative case	Locative case
	i	i	i	nungi	nung

== Numbers ==
Number system
×	Numeral	Cardinal number	Ordinal number
1	1	ka	tamaba
2	2	ana	tanabuba
3	3	asem	asembuba
4	4	pezü	
5	5	pungu	
6	6	terok	
7	7	tenet	
8	8	ti	
9	9	teku	
10	10	ter	
11	11	terka	
12	12	ter ana	
13	13	ter asem	
14	14	ter pezü	
15	15	ter pongu	
16	16	ter terok	
17	17	ter tenet	
18	18	ter ti	
19	19	ter teku	
20	20	metsü	
