= Ao language =

Tibeto-Burman language spoken by the Ao of Nagaland in northeast India

Ao
- Central Naga
- Geographic distribution: Nagaland, India
- Ethnicity: Ao Naga
- Linguistic classification: Sino-Tibetan: Tibeto-Burman; Central Tibeto-Burman (?); Kuki-Chin–Naga; Central Naga; Ao
- Subdivisions: Chungli Ao; Mongsen Ao; Changki Ao

Language codes
- ISO 639-3: njo
- Glottolog: aona1235

Ao is a dialect cluster of Naga languages spoken by the Ao Naga in Nagaland of northeast India, whose three varieties are mutually unintelligible or nearly so. Chungli Ao is written in Latin script.

== Ao language cluster ==
Ethnologue lists the following varieties of Ao.

- Mongsen Khari
- Changki
- Chongli (Chungli)
- Dordar (Yacham)
- Longla

Chongli and Mongsen are nearly mutually unintelligible.

Mills (1926) lists the Ao Naga tribes of Nagaland as speaking three languages: Chungli, Mongsen, and Changki. Chungli Ao and Mongsen Ao are spoken in majority of the Ao villages, whereas Changki speakers form the minor speakers.

Mongsen Ao is spoken primarily in the western part of Ao territory.

Changki Ao is spoken only in 3 villages - Changki, Japu and Longjemdang - which is poorly documented though reportedly related to Mongsen Ao. Some Changki speakers can fluently converse in both Mongsen and Chungli, but a Mongsen Ao cannot speak Changki or understand it, whereas a Chungli can hardly understand or speak Changki. Chungli Ao and Mongsen Ao are not mutually intelligible.

The speech of each Ao village has its own distinctive characteristics. Many villages contain both Chungli and Mongsen speakers.

== Phonology ==
See the individual languages for a description.
