= Mongsen Ao language =

Sino-Tibetan language spoken in India

Mongsen Ao
- Native to: India
- Region: Nagaland
- Ethnicity: Ao Naga
- Native speakers: 104,003 (2011 census)
- Language family: Sino-Tibetan: Tibeto-Burman; Central Tibeto-Burman (?); Kuki-Chin–Naga; Central Naga; Ao languages; Ao language; Mongsen Ao

Language codes
- ISO 639-3: None (mis)
- Glottolog: mong1332

A Mongsen Ao speaker speaking Mongsen and English.

Mongsen Ao is a member of the Ao languages, a branch of the Sino-Tibetan languages, predominantly spoken in central Mokokchung district of Nagaland, northeast India. Its speakers see the language as one of two varieties of a greater "Ao language," along with the prestige variety Chungli Ao.

A chapter in the anthropological monograph of Mills (1926) provides a grammatical sketch of the variety of Mongsen Ao spoken in Longjang village. Coupe (2003) is one of the few acoustic studies published on a Kuki-Chin-Naga language (only three exist). Coupe (2007) is a reference grammar of the language, based on a revision of his PhD dissertation (Coupe 2004).

== Phonology ==
This section describes the sound system of Mongsen Ao as spoken in Mangmetong village and is based on Coupe (2007).

=== Vowels ===
Mongsen Ao has 6 vowels:

	Front	Central		Back
	Front	modal	creaky	Back
Close	i	ʉ		u
Mid		ə		
Open		a	a̰	

- The high central /ʉ/ is rounded.
- The two low vowels /a, a̰/ differ in terms of phonation type. /a/ has modal voice (i.e. normal phonation); /a̰/ has creaky voice (also known as vocal fry, laryngealization). Coupe (2003) argues that this is a separate vowel phoneme and not a tone, a glottal stop, or resulting from prosodic effects.

=== Consonants ===
Mongsen Ao has 27 consonants:

			Labial	Alveolar	Palatal	Velar	Glottal
Nasal		voiceless	m̥	n̥		ŋ̊	
Nasal		voiced	m	n		ŋ	
Plosive		aspirated	pʰ	tʰ		kʰ	
Plosive		tenuis	p	t		k	
Affricate		aspirated		t͡sʰ	t͡ʃʰ		
Affricate		tenuis		t͡s	t͡ʃ		
Fricative		voiceless		s			h
Fricative		voiced		z			
Approximant	median	voiceless		ɹ̥	j̊	ʍ	
Approximant	median	voiced		ɹ	j	w	
Approximant	lateral	voiceless		l̥			
Approximant	lateral	voiced		l			

- Dental consonants /t, tʰ, ts, tsʰ, s, z, n, l/ are laminal denti-alveolar.
- The post-alveolar approximant /ɹ/ varies from an apical post-alveolar to subapical retroflex: [ɹ̠~ɻ].
- The glottal stop /ʔ/ occurs only at the end of words. However, in this position it contrasts with words ending in vowels: /āmī/ 'spear' vs. /āmīʔ/ 'person'. When a suffix is added to such words, the /ʔ/ is deleted: /tʃàʔ/ 'to eat' + /-ʉ̄ʔ/ CAUS → /tʃàʉʔ/ 'to cause to eat'. Thus, the glottal stop has a somewhat marginal phonemic status.

=== Tone ===
Ao is a tonal language with 3 contrasting lexical tones:

- high
- mid
- low

All are register tones.

=== Syllable and phonotactics ===
The generalized syllable structure of Ao is abbreviated as the following:

(C_{1})V(G)(C_{2})+T

(C_{1})

- Any of the 20 consonants may appear as an optional syllable onset (excluding the word-final /ʔ/).

V

- All 6 vowels may occur as the syllable nucleus.

(G)

- The optional glide elements following the head vowel are essentially non-syllabic offglide realizations of the 4 vowels /i, ʉ, u, a/. For example, /jàuŋ/ → [jàu̯ŋ] 'species of centipede'.
- The following are the possible tautsyllabic combinations: [iu̯, ia̯, əʉ̯, əu̯, ai̯, aʉ̯, au̯].

(C_{2})

- The following consonants may occur in the optional syllable coda: unaspirated stops, nasals, and the rhotic /p, t, k, m, n, ŋ, ɹ/. The glottal stop with its restricted distribution also occurs but only word-finally.

T

All syllables occur with one of the three tones. In a VG sequence, tone only occurs the vowel head.

== Syntax ==
Ao is an SOV language with postpositions. Adjectives, numerals and demonstratives follow the nouns they modify, whilst relative clauses may be either externally or internally headed. Adverbial subordinators are suffixes attached to the verb and the end of the subordinate clause.

== See also ==
- Ao Naga

== Bibliography ==
- Clark, E. W. (1981) [1893]. The Ao-Naga Grammar with Illustrations, Phrases, and Vocabulary. Delhi: Gian Publications, Mittal Publishers Distributors.
- Coupe, Alexander R. (2003). A Phonetic and Phonological Description of Ao: A Tibeto-Burman Language of Nagaland, North-east India. Pacific Linguistics. Vol. 543. Canberra: The Australian National University. doi:10.15144/PL-543. ISBN 0-85883-519-3.
- Coupe, Alexander R. (2004). The Mongsen Dialect of Ao: a language of Nagaland (PhD dissertation). La Trobe University.
- Coupe, Alexander R. (2007). A grammar of Mongsen Ao. Mouton Grammar Library. Vol. 39. Mouton de Gruyter. doi:10.1515/9783110198522. ISBN 978-3-11-019088-5. S2CID 142215440.
- Escamilla, Ramón Matthew Jr. (2012). An Updated Typology of Causative Constructions: Form-Function Mappings in Hupa (California Athabaskan), Chungli Ao (Tibeto-Burman), and Beyond (PhD dissertation). University of California, Berkeley.
- Gowda, K. S. Gurubasave (1972). Ao-Naga Phonetic Reader. CIIL Phonetic Reader Series. Vol. 7. Mysore: Central Institute of Indian Languages.
- Gowda, K. S. Gurubasave (1975). Ao Grammar. Grammar series. Vol. 1. Mysore: Central Institute of Indian Languages.
- Mills, J. P. (1926). The Ao Nagas. Foreword by Henry Balfour, supplementary notes and bibliography by J. H. Hutton. London: MacMillan & Co.
