= Ao Naga =

Major Naga ethnic group

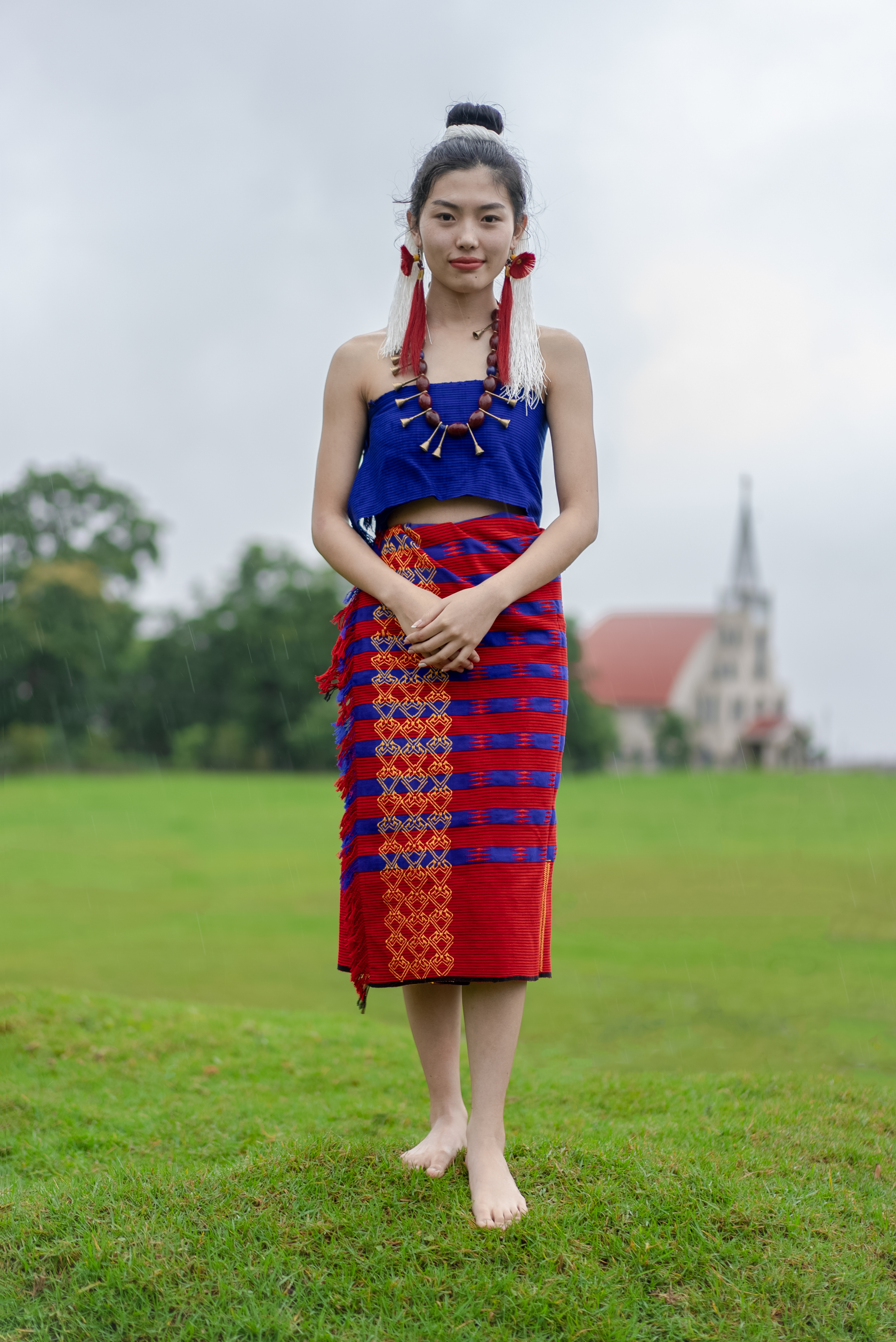
- Ao Mongsen Naga lady in her traditional attire

Regions with significant populations
- India
- Nagaland: 226,626

Languages
- Ao language (Mongsen, Chungli, Changki)

Religion
- Animism (historical), Protestantism (chiefly Baptist)

Related ethnic groups
- Other Naga people

The Aos are a major Naga ethnic group native to Mokokchung District of Nagaland in Northeast India. Their main territory is from Tsüla (Dikhu) Valley in the east to Tsürang (Disai) Valley in the west in Mokokchung District.

The Ao Nagas refer to themselves as Aoer, which means "those who came" from across the Dikhu river.

They were the first tribe of Nagas to be converted to Christianity, and by virtue of this development, the Aos availed themselves of the Western education that came along with Christianity. Christianity first entered into the Ao territory when an American Baptist missionary, Edward Winter Clark, reached an Ao village called Molungkimong in 1872. According to Edwin W. Clark's accounts, when he first set foot in Mulong village in 1872, Mulong, which was under the protectorate of Chungtia, had to seek permission from the latter for his stay which was promptly allowed by Chungtia village. Subsequently, he went on to spread Christianity all over Nagaland.

== Distribution ==
The total population of Ao Nagas in Nagaland is approximately 227,000 according to the 2011 census. Ao Nagas are primarily found in the northern part of Nagaland, mostly in the Mokokchung District and fewer in the adjacent Assam state. There are also sizable communities of Ao descent in the Kohima–Chümoukedima–Dimapur–Niuland belt of the state and in various other parts of the state.

=== Tzürangkong Range ===
They lay adjoining the plains of Assam mostly along the valley of Dissai and Jhanzi rivers just before they flow into the plains of Assam. These hillocks are densely covered with bamboos and the climate of the entire range is warm.

=== Japukong Range ===
It is the outermost range stretching from north-east to south-west lying to the interior south of Tzurangkong Range.

=== Jangpetkong Range ===
This is a parallel range east of the Japukong Range.

=== Asetkong Range ===
It is a central range running from east to west but compared to the other ranges, it is the shortest one. This range lies between Melak and Menung rivers, and therefore, it resembles an island. Hence the name Asetkong (Aset meaning Island)

=== Langpangkong Range ===
It is the easternmost range skirting along the course of Dikhu River. The river forms a natural boundary line of Mokokchung with Tuensang and Longleng districts. This range is spread like a bed and so the name has been aptly given to this range. (Langpang means bed)

=== Onpangkong Range ===
It is the southernmost range forming an irregular boundary of the Ao area with that of the Lothas and Sümis to the south and with the Sangtams to the east. It is called Ongpangkong as the land is higher and cooler than the other ranges. (Ongpang means higher)

== Culture ==
=== Festivals ===
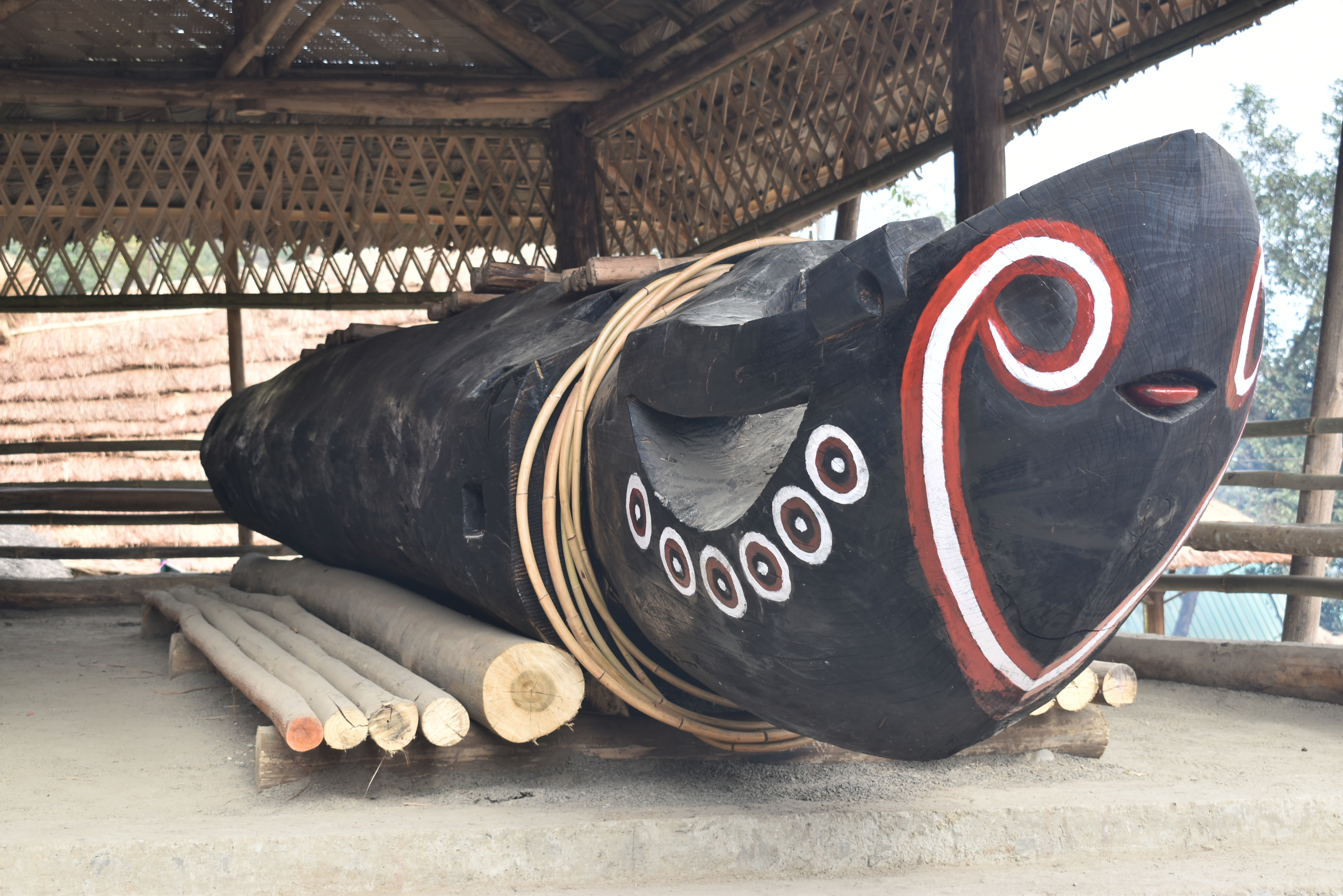
Ao Naga Ceremonial Log Drum

==== Moatsü Festival ====
The Moatsü Festival (Sowing Festival) is observed in the first week of May every year, after the sowing is done. The festival provides a period of recreation and entertainment after the stressful work of clearing fields, burning jungles and sowing seeds.

==== Tsüngremmong Festival ====
The Tsüngremmong Festival (Harvest Festival) is the biggest festival of the community and is celebrated immediately after the harvest of the crop. The festival is typically held in August and is marked by offering prayers to God, singing, dancing and feasting.

=== Religion ===
The traditional religion is animist, holding that spirits, both benevolent and malicious, must be appealed to and placated through ceremony and sacrifice. Among the Ao deities, Lichaba, the creator, is revered most highly.

Edwin W. Clark, an American missionary traveled to Nagaland in 1872 with the intention to carry out missionary work in the country. Clark approached his work among the Ao as a civilizing mission, seeking to replace traditional culture and language with that of the West. The first family to convert to Christianity was the "Aier" family.

Since the 19th century, the majority of Ao have converted to Christianity. Many Ao people, however continue to practice traditional animist festivals and rituals removed from their religious contexts.

=== Cuisine ===
Traditional Ao cuisine is characteristically non-vegetarian food, preferably cooked by boiling instead of frying. Pork meat is the most popular meat and mostly cooked with fermented bamboo shoots. Food flavors are enhanced through local herbal ingredients and spices. Ao cuisine tends to be spicy in nature. A signature food item of the Aos is Anishi, a dried paste made from taro leaves. It adds a distinct smoky flavor and deep black color to dishes.

=== Handicrafts ===
Weaving is traditionally done by the women who design and weave exquisite patterns in their shawls, sling bags, headgears and wraparound garments (commonly called Mekhala).

Cane and bamboo products are used for making mats, basketry, mugs and plates, sofas, head bands, leg guards, bangles, neck bands, necklace, armlets, leggings, Fish Traps and Fish Baskets etc.

Wood Carvings of human beings, hornbill, mithun head, elephants, tiger and other animals which are displayed at the entrance of the village gates or front doors or porch of the houses.

Traditional Ornaments worn by both men and women specially during festive occasions, including necklaces, earrings, armlets and bracelets and headgears etc. These are usually made out of beads, brass, bones and horns of animals, boar’s teeth, ivory, shells and precious stones and metals.

Pottery used for cooking and storing water and other items and are made out of a special type of soils/clay.

Metal Work consisting of agricultural implements, ornaments, weapons for hunting and war, like spears and the Dao (Naga sword).

== Notable people ==
- L. Kijungluba Ao (1906–97), Baptist Missionary
- Longri Ao (1906–1981) Missionary to the Konyak Nagas
- Mayangnokcha Ao (1901–1988), Educationist and Writer
- P. Shilu Ao (1916–1988), First Chief Minister of the Indian state of Nagaland
- Talimeren Ao (1918–1988), Footballer
- Temsüla Ao, Writer and Ethnographer
- T. Senka Ao (born 1945), Journalist
- Monalisa Changkija, Author and Journalist
- Imnainla Jamir (born 2002), Guitarist
- Metsübo Jamir (born 1959), Politician
- Piyong Temjen Jamir, Scholar
- S. C. Jamir (born 1931), Former Chief Minister of the Indian State of Nagaland and Former Governor of Indian States of Maharashtra and Odisha
- P. Kilemsungla (born 1951), Educationist
- Imtikümzük Longkümer (1967–2018), Politician
- Sharingain Longkümer (born 1981), Politician
- Temjen Imna Along Longkümer (born 1980), Politician
- Macnivil (born 1992), Rapper and Recording Artist
- Tongpang Ozüküm (born 1981), Politician

== Gallery ==
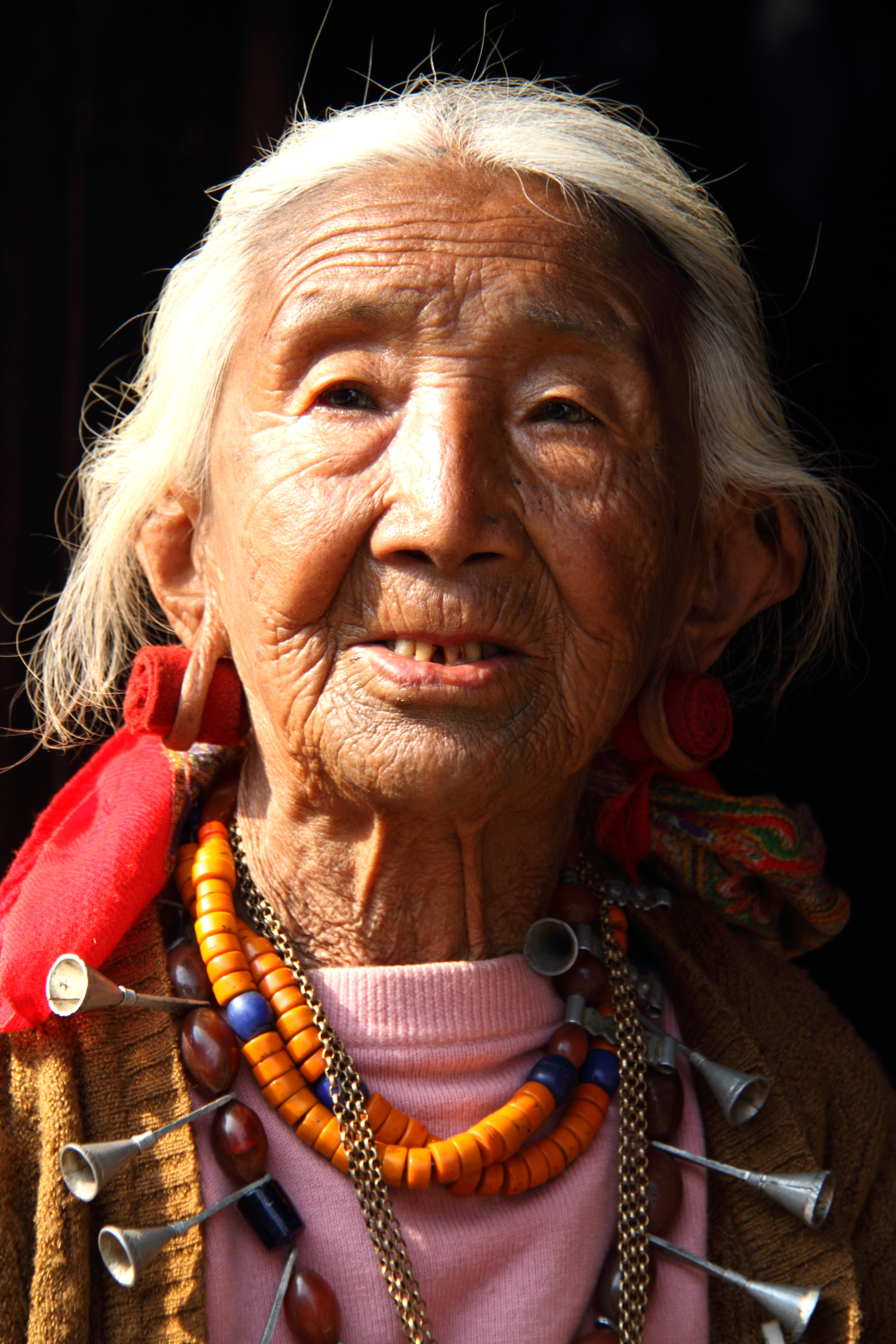
Ao Naga woman in traditional attire

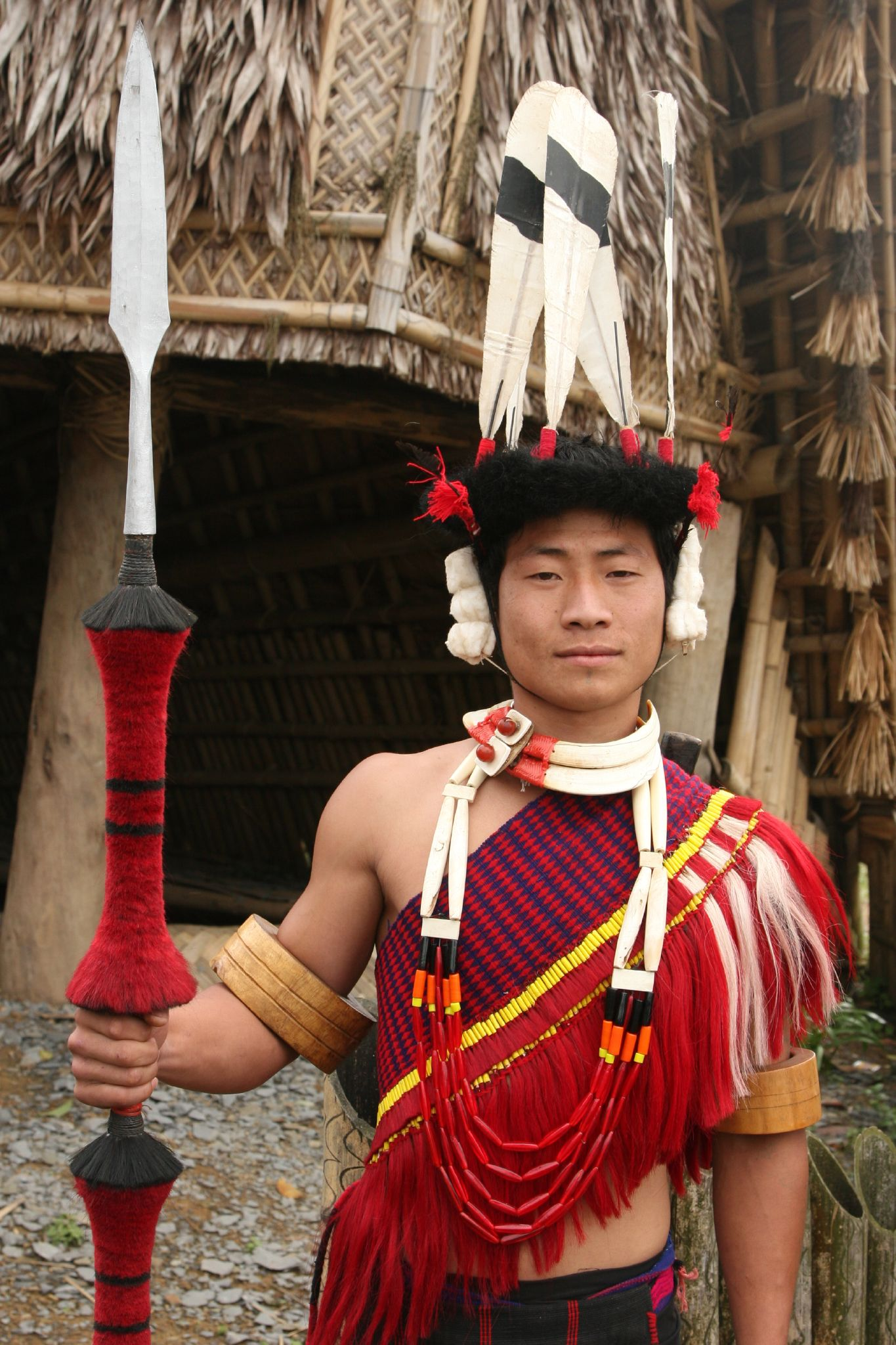
Ao Naga man in Chuchuyimlang village

== See also ==
- Ao language
- Naga people
- Tsüngkotepsü (The Ao Naga Shawl)

== Bibliography ==
- Mills, J. P. (1926). The Ao Nagas. London: Macmillan and Co.
- Smith, William C. (2002). The Ao-Naga tribe of Assam. New Delhi: Mittal.
- Oppitz, Michael, Thomas Kaiser, Alban von Stockhausen & Marion Wettstein. 2008. Naga Identities: Changing Local Cultures in the Northeast of India. Gent: Snoeck Publishers.
- Kunz, Richard & Vibha Joshi. 2008. Naga – A Forgotten Mountain Region Rediscovered. Basel: Merian.
- von Stockhausen, Alban. 2014. Imag(in)ing the Nagas: The Pictorial Ethnography of Hans-Eberhard Kauffmann and Christoph von Fürer-Haimendorf. Arnoldsche, Stuttgart, ISBN 978-3-89790-412-5.
- Wettstein, Marion. 2014. Naga Textiles: Design, Technique, Meaning and Effect of a Local Craft Tradition in Northeast India. Arnoldsche, Stuttgart, ISBN 978-3-89790-419-4.
