= Mokokchung =

- Town and municipality
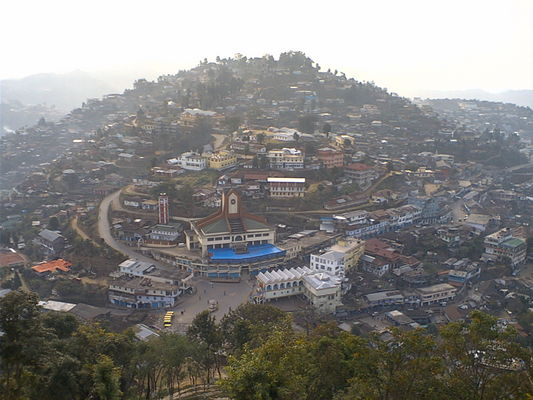
- View of the town
- Nickname: Land of Pioneers
- Location in Nagaland, India Mokokchung (India)
- Coordinates: 26.32°N 94.50°E
- Country: India
- Region: Northeast India
- State: Nagaland
- District: Mokokchung

Government
  - Type: Municipality
  - Body: Mokokchung Municipal Council
- Elevation: 1,325 m (4,347 ft)

Population (2011)
  - Total: 35,913

Languages
  - Official: English
  - Dialect: Ao
- Time zone: UTC+5:30 (IST)
- PIN: 798601
- Telephone code: 91 (0)369
- Vehicle registration: NL-02
- Website: mokokchung.nic.in

Mokokchung (/ˌməʊkɒktʃʌŋ/) is a municipality in the Mokokchung District of the Indian state of Nagaland. It serves as the district headquarters as well as the main urban hub of Mokokchung District. Mokokchung is the cultural nerve centre of the Ao people and is economically and politically the most important urban centre in northern Nagaland. The town is made up of 16 wards, of which Kumlong, Sangtemla, Alempang and Yimyu are the largest.

== History ==
Historically, Mokokchung was one of the first Naga Hills sites where the Assam Rifles, led by Britishers, established their outposts (then called stockades) in the later part of the 19th century. Much of the town initially grew around this post located in the DC Hill. The British administration was then gradually extended eastwards towards the remoter parts of the Naga Hills.

=== 1994 Mokokchung Massacre ===
Also referred to as Ayatai Mokokchung by the citizens of the town, the incident took place on 27 December 1994, when forces of the 10th Assam Rifles and the 12th Maratha Light Infantry of the Indian Army raided upon the civilian populace of Mokokchung. The incident lasted for about 2 hours and left 89 shops, 48 houses, 17 vehicles and 7 two-wheelers reduced to ashes, excluding those destroyed by gunfire and shelling. 7 civilians were gunned down, another 5 burned alive including a child, several women raped and more than a dozen gone missing. The brutalities of the Assam Rifles have been a driving force for much Naga nationalism.

== Geography ==
Mokokchung is located at 26.33°N 94.53°E at an elevation of 1325 metres (4347 feet) above sea level.

Mokokchung has a mild climate throughout the year. For ten months of the year, maximum temperature hovers in the mid twenties. Mokokchung also witnesses a lot of mist in the rainy months.

== Demographics ==
Mokokchung is a Municipal Committee city in district of Mokokchung, Nagaland. The Mokokchung city is divided into 18 wards for which elections are held every 5 years. The Mokokchung Municipal Committee has population of 35,913 of which 18,898 are males while 17,015 are females as per report released by Census India 2011. The population of children aged 0-6 is 3429 which is 9.55 % of total population of Mokokchung (MC). In Mokokchung Municipal Committee, the female sex ratio is 900 against state average of 931. Moreover the child sex ratio in Mokokchung is around 925 compared to Nagaland state average of 943. The literacy rate of Mokokchung city is 94.63 % higher than the state average of 79.55 %. In Mokokchung, male literacy is around 94.46 % while the female literacy rate is 94.81 %.

Mokokchung Municipal Committee has total administration over 8,327 houses to which it supplies basic amenities like water and sewerage. It is also authorize to build roads within Municipal Committee limits and impose taxes on properties coming under its jurisdiction.

== Suburbs ==
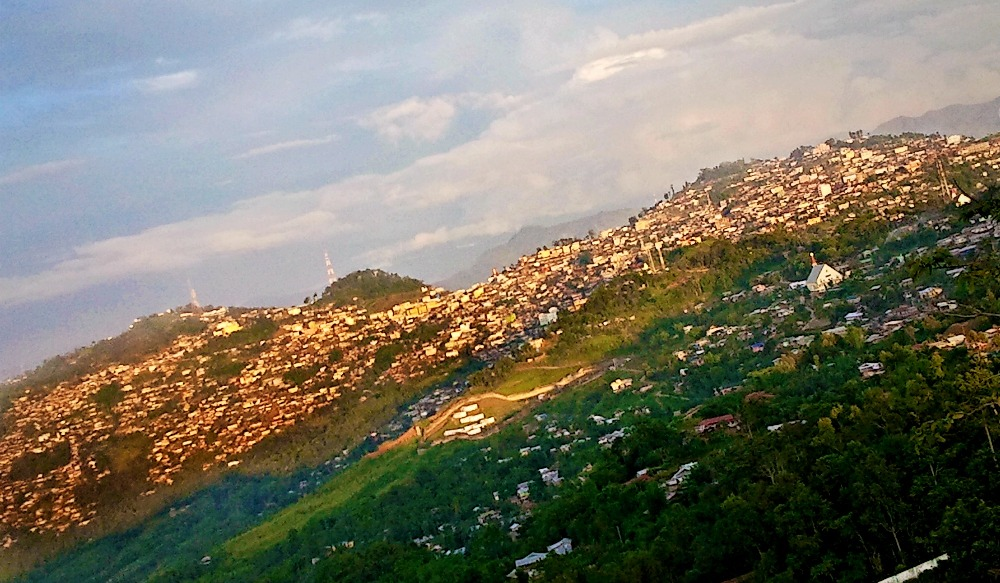
Mokokchung, Nagaland

Mokokchung lies at the centre of the urban areas of Mokokchung district, a series of settlements from Alichen in the south, through Mokokchung town up to Amenyong and Khensa in the North West; and from Mokokchung town through Fazl Ali College up to DEF colony in the North East.

The trend of sub urbanization in Mokokchung (which had started in Western countries in the sixties) started in the eighties with the mushrooming of satellite towns like Yimyu and Marepkong. Today, the urban settlement has spilled outside the historical boundary of Mokokchung town. This trend has speeded up (since the late 1990s) so much so that the erstwhile satellite town of Yimyu boomed and spread towards Mokokchung and became conjoined with it. Today it has become a ward of Mokokchung. As a result of this flight to the suburbs, population growth in Mokokchung town (the area under the municipality comprising the fifteen wards) has slowed down while the satellite towns are booming.

So far the villages of Chuchuyimpang, Mokokchung Village, Khensa and Ungma have acquired urban characteristics and been engulfed by the urban spread of Mokokchung. Although not part of the municipality, they have become very much a part of Mokokchung and are confused by many tourists as being localities of the town.

People are now living miles away from the main town in smaller suburbs as well as villages, who drive to work daily to the main town.

== Culture ==
=== Religion ===
In addition to Christianity, the other religions and faiths practiced in Mokokchung - mainly by immigrant business community from Mainland India - are Hinduism, Sikhism and Islam.

=== Media ===
- Mokokchung Times (daily newspaper in English)
- Lenjeter (monthly magazine in Ao)
- Tir Yimyim (daily newspaper in Ao)

The various satellite cable TV network provider also runs local channels of their own.

== Politics ==
Mokokchung has political importance in Nagaland. Apart from Mokokchung town constituency, parts of the town fall under three other state assembly constituencies—namely, Aonglenden and Mongoya—thus making the town the deciding factor in 3 of 60 assembly seats in the state legislature. Leaders from the town played a major role in brokering a deal with the Government of India at the height of the Indo-Naga conflict in the 1950s, resulting in the formation of Nagaland state as the 16th state of India in 1963.

Over the last two decades, Mokokchung has become a stronghold of the Indian National Congress party which can be partly attributed to the fact that the party was led by S. Chubatoshi Jamir whose constituency was Aonglenden. In the 2003 general Assembly elections, Indian National Congress won Aonglenden, Mongoya and Mokokchung town constituencies while Koridang constituency was won by an Independent candidate.

Notable political leaders:

- P. Shilu Ao, the first Chief Minister of Nagaland
- S. C. Jamir, the longest-serving Chief Minister of Nagaland and the former governor of the States of Goa, Maharashtra and Odisha.
- T. Aliba Imti, a former Member of Parliament (Rajya Sabha) and the first president of the Naga National Council (NNC)
- N. I. Jamir, Former Chief Secretary of Nagaland and Minister
- Imkong L. Imchen, present Member of Legislative Assembly from Koridang constituency
- K. Asungba Sangtam, two time former Member of Parliament (Lok Sabha)
- C. Apok Jamir, former Member of Parliament (Rajya Sabha) and Former Member of Legislative Assembly from Aonglenden constituency
- Supongmeren, former Member of Legislative Assembly from Mongoya constituency
- T. Sentichuba, present Member of Legislative Assembly from Angetyongpang constituency
- Dr. Ngangshi K. Ao, present Member of Legislative Assembly from Mongoya constituency

== Sports ==
Football, volleyball, basketball, badminton and cricket are the most popular sports in Mokokchung. The town has two basketball courts, two football fields, one badminton stadium, and one cricket field.

== Education ==
Schools

- Queen Mary Higher Secondary School
- Mayangnokcha Higher Secondary School (MGHSS)
- Jubilee Memorial Higher Secondary School
- Edith Douglas Higher Secondary School
- Lady Bird Higher Secondary School
- Hill View Higher Secondary School
- Model Higher Secondary School
- Town Higher Secondary School
- Canaan Christian Higher Secondary School
- Assam Rifles High School
- Hills Night High School
- Children School
- Nagaland Christian Residential School (NCRS)

=== Universities and Colleges ===
- Fazl Ali College
- Jubilee Memorial College (estd. 2015)
- People's College
- College of Teachers Education
- Institute of Communication & Information Technology
- Industrial Training Institute
- National Institute of Electronics and Information Technology Extension Centre, Chuchuyimlang

== Transportation ==
Mokokchung's central location has helped it to be the converging point of maximum number of highways making it a major transport hub that connects various areas of Nagaland, including Kohima and Dimapur. Besides, every village and settlement of the district is well linked to the town by district and community roads.

Major Highways that pass through Mokokchung are:

- NH 2 (Dibrugarh–Mokokchung–Kohima–Imphal–Churachandpur–Seling–Tuipang)
- NH 202 (Mokokchung–Tuensang–Jessami–Imphal)
- NH 702D Mokokchung–Mariani–Jorhat Highway
- Mokokchung–Chare
- Mokokchung–Noksen
