= List of railway stations in Nagaland =

The following is a list of railway stations in the Indian state of Nagaland:

== List of stations ==
Alphabetical list of railway stations in Nagaland along with the station codes:

Station Code	Station Name	Location	References
DSPR	Dhansiripar Railway Station	Dhansiripar, Chümoukedima District	
DMV	Dimapur Railway Station	Dimapur, Dimapur District	
KIBNG	Khaibung Railway Station	Khaibung, Chümoukedima District	
ZUBZA	Kohima Zubza Railway Station	Sechü Zubza, Kohima District	
MUJA	Mengujüma Railway Station	Mengujüma, Kohima District	
MLVM	Molvom Railway Station	Molvom, Chümoukedima District	
PERM	Pherima Railway Station	Pherima, Chümoukedima District	
PPHA	Piphema Railway Station	Piphema, Chümoukedima District	
SKHV	Shokhüvi Railway Station	Shokhüvi, Chümoukedima District	

== List of railway lines ==
Alphabetical list of railway lines in Nagaland:

- Dhansiri–Zubza line: Stations are in the following order—Dimapur, Dhansiripar, Shokhüvi, Molvom, Khaibung, Pherima, Piphema, Mengujüma and Zubza (Kohima).
- Kohima–Imphal line (planned)

== See also ==
- List of railway stations in India
- North Eastern Railway Connectivity Project
- Geostrategic railways under-construction in India
- India-China Border roads and rails
- China–India railway
