= Khrielie-ü Kire =

Naga physician

- Born: 12 January 1918; Kohima, Naga Hills District, Assam Province, British India (Now in Kohima District, Nagaland, India)
- Died: 11 September 2013 (aged 95); Kohima, Nagaland, India
- Other names: Dr. K. K. Angami
- Education: Baptist Mission School
- Alma mater: Christian Medical College; Assam Medical College
- Occupations: Physician and Bureaucrat

Khrielie-ü Kire (12 January 1918 — 11 September 2013) was a Naga physician and bureaucrat who was the first female physician practicing Western medicine among the Nagas.

== Early life ==
Khrielie-ü Kire was born on 12 January 1918 to an Angami Naga family from Kohima Village. Her mother and father were Neikuonuo and Zetsovi Kire.

Kire did her schooling from Baptist Mission School, Kohima and studied Licentiate Medicine Surgery (LMS) from Christian Medical College in Ludhiana. She went on to do her MBBS from Assam Medical College at Dibrugarh in 1952.

== Career ==
Khrielie-ü Kire started her career in 1947 with honorary service at the Naga Hospital Authority, Kohima.

She later served as the Director of the Department of Health and Family Welfare, Nagaland.

== Later life and death ==
After retirement from government service, Kire served as the convener of the first Naga Mothers' Association, founding member and first honorary secretary of Nagaland State Red Cross Society and President of Nagaland Institute of Health and Social Welfare Board.

Kire died on 11 September 2013 at 17:40 Indian Standard Time (UTC+05:30), at her personal residence in Midland Ward, Kohima.
