= Murder of Vihozhonü Zao =

2025 murder case in Kohima, Nagaland

- Vihozhonü Zao, the victim of the 2025 murder case
- Location: 25.653186°N 94.098228°E; Old Ministers' Hill, Kohima, Nagaland, India
- Date: 24 October 2025; 0 years ago c. 2:00 p.m. (IST; UTC+05:30)
- Attack type: Murder by blunt force trauma
- Weapon: Blunt object (piece of firewood)
- Victim: Vihozhonü Zao
- Perpetrator: Samuel Zao

Vihozhonü Zao (19 September 2003 – 24 October 2025) was a 22-year-old Indian state-level basketball player from Nagaland who was murdered by her adopted uncle, Samuel Zao. Her body was discovered the following morning, covered in a gunny sack, near a ring well in their residential compound at Old Ministers' Hill, Kohima. The case drew widespread public outrage and condemnation.

== Personal background ==
Vihozhonü Zao
- Born: 19 September 2003; Jakhama, Kohima District, Nagaland, India
- Died: 24 October 2025 (aged 22); Old Ministers' Hill, Kohima, Nagaland, India
- Other name: Viho
- Education: Little Flower Higher Secondary School
- Alma mater: St. Joseph's College, Jakhama
- Occupation: Basketball player

Vihozhonü Zao was born on 19 September 2003 to an Angami Naga family from Jakhama. Her father, Keneithuto Zao, died on 12 October 2011, when she was eight years old. Zao was a state-level basketball player who represented Nagaland in several national basketball competitions, including the Under-23 National Basketball Championship held in Guwahati. She also represented the Kohima District Basketball Association in the 2022 Nagaland Olympic & Paralympic Games winning a gold medal.

In 2025, she graduated from St. Joseph's College, Jakhama, where she was among the top students in the Economics Department.

== Discovery and investigation ==
At around 6:00 a.m. on 25 October, Vihozhonü Zao was found dead by neighbours passing by near a ring well in the basement of her residential compound. Her body was covered with a gunny sack, clothes and pieces of firewoods. A case was subsequently registered at the Kohima Women Police Station following a complaint filed by her paternal uncle, Vikethozo Zao.

The police received the information at 7:45 a.m. and officers from the Kohima South Police Station secured the scene at 8:20 a.m. A team from the Forensic Science Laboratory (FSL), Dimapur, arrived at the scene at 2:05 p.m. and conducted forensic examination of the crime scene, including photography, videography and the collection of physical evidence. A detection dog was also deployed as part of the investigation. An inquest was conducted in the presence of independent witnesses, after which the body was sent to the Naga Hospital Authority (NHAK) for post-mortem examination.

Police described the case as a "blind case" because the location where the body was recovered was believed to be a secondary crime scene, making it difficult for investigators to immediately establish the motive or sequence of events. On 26 October, Kohima Police constituted a Special Investigation Team (SIT) headed by Additional Superintendent of Police K. Soriso and comprising eight members to investigate the case.

== Arrest ==
On the night of 4 November 2025, Kohima Police arrested Samuel Zao, the victim's 31-year-old adopted paternal uncle at his residence. He was identified as the prime accused and was taken into police custody after several rounds of questioning.

Police stated that Samuel Zao confessed to the murder during interrogation. According to investigators, the offence occurred inside the residence on 24 October 2025, while the location where the body was recovered was identified as a secondary crime scene.

During a press conference the following day, Superintendent of Police Krodi Rhetso stated that the investigation, supported by forensic evidence and witness examination, led to the arrest of the accused in what had initially been treated as a "blind case".

Samuel Zao
- Born: 1994 (age 31–32); Nepal

Sources states that Samuel was originally of Nepali descent. His adoptive father was Holto Zao and he was adopted into the Zao family by the victim's aunt.

=== Sequence of events ===
On 24 October 2025, at around 2:00 p.m. Samuel asked Vihozhonü to prepare tea. When she did not respond and continued using her mobile phone. Samuel became enraged and he struck her multiple times on the head with a piece of firewood, causing her to collapse.

Samuel then wrapped her head with a sweater, supposedly to stop the bleeding. He then switched off her mobile phone, removed its SIM card, broke the handset and disposed of the pieces in a Kohima Municipal Council (KMC) garbage truck the following morning. The sweater used to wipe the blood was also discarded in a sewage drain in an attempt to destroy the evidence.

The body was kept inside Samuel's room overnight. He later disposed the body near a ring well in the basement of their residential compound, where it was discovered the following day.

Investigators found no evidence indicating the involvement of any accomplices. At the time of the incident, only the accused, the victim and the victim's grandmother, who was tending to plants on the terrace, were present in the house. The kitchen was identified as the primary crime scene, while the area near the ring well where the body was recovered was identified as the secondary crime scene.

== Aftermath ==
The case of Zao's killing shocked the community of Nagaland, as well as making headlines nationally.

On 31 October 2025, thousands of people participated in a candlelight vigil in Kohima. During the event, community leaders called for a fair and transparent investigation.

Following the arrest of the accused, the Porütso Khel community of Jakhama invoked its customary law and demanded capital punishment for the accused. On 8 November 2025, members of the Khel vandalised the Zao's residence at Old Ministers' Hill, Kohima. However, the rooms belonging to Vihozhonü and her younger brother were left untouched. The Khel stated that murder is regarded as a grave taboo under its customary law and announced the ostracisation of the victim's aunt and grandmother from the village. However, investigating authorities had not established any involvement of the two women in the case. The Khel also stated that Samuel was an adopted son and not a biological member of the Zao family.

On 18 November 2025, the Southern Angami Youth Organisation (SAYO) organised a peaceful rally in Kohima demanding justice for Vihozhonü Zao. Thousands of people marched from PHQ Junction to the Office of the Deputy Commissioner, demanding swift action and capital punishment for the accused. A memorandum was submitted during the rally calling for the arrest of all those involved in the case, including any accomplices and stated that no one connected with the case should remain at large.

== See also ==
- Violence against women in India
