= List of institutions of higher education in Kohima =

Kohima is a leading center of education in Nagaland and houses the following institutions:

== Universities and tertiary institutions ==
- Alder College (1992)
- Baptist College (1982)
- Capital College of Higher Education (2004)
- Kohima College (1967)
- KROS College (2006)
- Model Christian College (2007)
- Modern College (1997)
- Mountain View Christian College (1991)
- Mount Olive College (1992)
- Nagaland Institute of Medical Science and Research (2022)
- Oriental College (1996)

The following are major Universities and tertiary institutions located in the Greater Kohima Metropolitan Area:

- Japfü Christian College, Kigwema (1996)
- Kohima Science College, Jotsoma (1961)
- Nagaland University, Meriema Campus (1994)
- Sazolie College, Jotsoma (2005)
- St. Joseph's College, Jakhama (1985)

== Primary and secondary schools ==
- Baptist High School (1959)
- Bethel Higher Secondary School (1981)
- Chandmari Higher Secondary School (1974)
- Coraggio School (2004)
- Dainty Buds School (1987)
- Don Bosco Higher Secondary School (1972)
- Fernwood School (1988)
- G. Rio School (2005)
- Holy Family School (1991)
- Little Flower Higher Secondary School (1964)
- Merhülietsa School (1974)
- Mezhür Higher Secondary School (1958)
- Ministers' Hill Baptist Higher Secondary School (1968)
- Mount Sinai Higher Secondary School (1987)
- Northfield School (2002)
- Rüzhükhrie Government Higher Secondary School (1941)
- Stella Higher Secondary School (1987)
- Trinity School (2003)
- Vikesel's Vision School (1994)
- The Vineyard School (2003)
- Vinyüzo School (2007)

== See also ==
- List of institutions of higher education in Nagaland
- List of schools in Nagaland
