= Dhansiri–Zubza line =

Railroad in India

Dhansiri–Zubza Line

Overview
- Status: Under construction
- Owner: Indian Railways
- Locale: Nagaland
- Termini: Dhansiri; Zubza
- Stations: 8
- Website: Indian Railway Website

History
- Planned opening: December 2029 (Expected)

Technical
- Line length: 82.5 km (51.3 mi)
- Number of tracks: Single Diesel-Line
- Track gauge: 5 ft 6 in (1,676 mm)
- Electrification: No

The Dhansiri–Zubza Line is a single-track railroad under construction between the two major cities of the Indian state of Nagaland—Dimapur and Kohima. The line starts from Dhansiri junction near Dimapur Railway Station to Kohima Zubza Railway Station. It is a part of Northeast Frontier Railway zone of Indian Railways.

== Main line ==
=== History ===
First announced in 2006, the line is currently expected to open in December 2029. As part of the Indian Railway's ambitious plan to connect all the capitals of the north-eastern states by broad gauge rail link, railway minister Suresh Prabhu laid the foundation stone of the 88-km rail line to bring Kohima, the capital of Nagaland, on the railway map of India. The project will be executed in three phases.

- The first phase involves the construction of Dhansiri to Shokhuvi (16 km) line.
- The second phase involves Shokhüvi to Khaibung. (30 km)
- The third phase involves Khaibung to Zubza. (45 km)

=== Route ===
Stations are in the following order on the Dhansiri–Zubza line (Dimapur-Imphal line): Dimapur, Dhansiripar, Shokhüvi, Molvom, Khaibung, Pherima, Pephema, Mengujuma and Kohima.

The alphabetical list of stations with codes is as follows:

Station Code	Station Name	Location
DSPR	Dhansiripar Railway Station	Dhansiripar, Chümoukedima District
SHKV	Shokhüvi Railway Station	Shokhüvi, Chümoukedima District
MLVM	Molvom Railway Station	Molvom, Chümoukedima District
KIBNG	Khaibung Railway Station	Khaibung, Chümoukedima District
PERM	Pherima Railway Station	Pherima, Chümoukedima District
PPHA	Piphema Railway Station	Piphema, Chümoukedima District
MUJA	Mengujüma Railway Station	Mengujüma, Kohima District
ZUBZA	Kohima Zubza Railway Station	Sechü Zubza, Kohima District

=== Current status ===
- 2024 Jun: 52% work on the 82.5 km line from Dimapur to Zubza near Kohima has been completed, railway has requested the Nagaland Government to expedite the land acquisition process which is holding up progress on this rail link. Molovom-Pherima (14 km) completion target date is October 2026, Pherima-Zuzba target completion date is December 2029 (May 2025 official update).
- 2025 Sept: Northwest Frontier Railway announced that the target completion date has been moved 1 year earlier to December 2028.

== Railway in Nagaland ==
=== Zubza-Kohima line ===
==== Details ====
Kohima Station (Zubza) to Kohima City Center is final 15 km line.

==== Route ====
Alignment revised to avoid populated areas.

==== Current status ====
- 2025 Jun: Expected completion is 2027–2028 due to the land acquisition disputes with local communities.

=== Kohima-Imphal line ===
==== Details ====
Kohima-Imphal line, proposed ~220 km ₹ 25,000+ crore line will run through Patkai mointain ranage and require 50+ tunnels, route will be decided after FSL (Final Location Survey).

==== Current status ====
- July 2025: Proposed, but not yet surveyed, still in the pre-feasibility stage, hence likely to see progress only after 2030.

=== Dimapur-Tizit line ===
==== Details ====
Dimapur-Tizit line, proposed, Rs4,274 ~257 km long line was approved in 2013, runs entirely within Nagaland along western border of Nagaland from Dimapur near southwest border of Nagaland till Tizit on northwest border of Nagaland near southeast-most Arunachal.

==== Current status ====
- May 2025: No further budget allocation has been made as of May 2025 official update and no completion deadline has been set because CCEA budget approval is awaited.

== See also ==
- North Eastern Railway Connectivity Project
