= Molvom Railway Station =

Railway station in Nagaland India

- Indian Railways logo

General information
- Location: Molvom, Chümoukedima District, Nagaland; India
- Coordinates: 25°44′37″N 93°50′58″E
- Elevation: 326 metres (1,070 ft)
- System: Indian Railways station
- Owner: Indian Railways
- Operator: Northeast Frontier Railway
- Line: Dhansiri–Zubza line
- Platforms: 2
- Tracks: 3

Construction
- Structure type: Standard (on-ground station)
- Parking: Yes
- Accessible: Disabled access

Other information
- Status: functioning
- Station code: MLVOM
- Zone(s): Northeast Frontier Railway
- Division(s): Lumding

History
- Opened: 2023
Location

Molvom Railway Station coded MLVOM is a railway station currently under construction at Molvom in the Chümoukedima District of the Indian state of Nagaland. It will be the second railway station after Shokhüvi Railway Station on the Dhansiri–Zubza line.

== See also ==
- List of railway stations in Nagaland
- Dhansiri–Zubza line
- Kohima Zubza Railway Station
