= Mezhür Higher Secondary School =

Location
- Midland Ward, Kohima, Nagaland, India; 25.6656°N 94.1030°E

Information
- Type: Private
- Motto: Ever More and Better Ever
- Established: 18 August 1958; 67 years ago
- Grades: Kindergarten (Nursery, A, B) – 12
- Gender: Coeducational
- Age: 4 to 18
- Affiliation: Nagaland Board of School Education (NBSE)
- Houses: (Blue) (Green) (Red) (Yellow)
- Website: mezhurhss.co.in

Mezhür Higher Secondary School is a private school in Kohima, Nagaland, India providing both high school and higher secondary school education. The school was previously known as Kohima English School.

== History ==
The School was founded on 18 August 1958 by Samuel Mezhür Sekhose. Initially named as Little Flower School, the school was renamed in 1962 as Kohima English School.

In 1998, the Nagaland Government introduced a regulation that the word ENGLISH be removed from the names of all the schools in the state and thus the present name was given in memory of its founder.

== Campus ==
Mezhür Higher Secondary School is located at Midland Ward, Kohima, Nagaland. The campus is spread over three acres. The school is composed of 5 building blocks consisting of 67 rooms. There are 2 basketball courts, a table tennis court, 2 computer labs, a science laboratory, 3 auditoriums and a school canteen.

== Extra-curricular activities ==
- Annual Sports' Meet
- Annual School Fete
- Banuo Memorial Inter-School Basketball Tournament
- Traditional cum Cultural Day
- Flower Exhibition
- Teacher's Day Celebration
- Fresher's cum Farewell Functions
- Fancy Dress Competition
- Youth Parliament Competition
- Quiz Competition
- Parent's Day
- Children's Day
- Singing Competition

== Notable alumni ==
- Neidonuo Angami (b. 1950), Social Activist
- Vihozhonü Zao, State-level Basketball Player and Murder Victim

== See also ==
- List of higher education and academic institutions in Kohima
- List of schools in Nagaland
