= Sirhi Angami =

- Village
- Location of Sirhi Angami Sirhi Angami (India)
- Coordinates: 25.715286°N 93.997637°E
- Country: India
- State: Nagaland
- District: Kohima

Population (2011)
  - Total: 286

Languages
  - Official: English
- Time zone: UTC+5:30 (IST)
- Vehicle registration: NL-01
- Sex ratio: 932 ♂/♀

Sirhi Angami is a village in Kohima district of Nagaland state of India.
