= Little Flower Higher Secondary School, Kohima =

Little Flower Higher Secondary School

Location
- Kohima, Nagaland; India; 25°39′3″N 94°6′19″E

Information
- Type: Private
- Established: 1964; 62 years ago
- Founder: Salesian Sisters
- Principal: Sr. Lucy Thomas Nedumala
- Grades: Kindergarten (A-B) – 12
- Gender: Girls
- Affiliation: Nagaland Board of School Education (NBSE)
- Website: www.lfskohima.in

Little Flower Higher Secondary School is an all-girls Catholic school in Kohima in the Indian state of Nagaland providing both High school and Higher secondary school education. It was established in 1964 by the Salesian Sisters of Northeast India and is the only all-girls school in Nagaland.

== Overview ==
Little Flower Higher Secondary School, Kohima is a Catholic Educational Institution owned and managed by the Salesian Sisters. Though the Catholic Schools are meant primarily for Catholics, they may also admit other children irrespective of caste or creed.

It runs according to the principles and methods of the modern educator, St. John Bosco. The constant effort of the well trained staff is to develop the individual personality of each pupil and bring out those qualities which are best and noblest in them. Special attention is given to ensure a high standard of morality and discipline in the School.

== History ==
Little Flower Higher Secondary School, Kohima was established in 1964 and is owned by the Salesian Sisters of North-East India which has its headquarters at Guwahati, Assam. It later expanded producing its first HSLC Batch in 1972.

It was upgraded to Higher Secondary in 2003 and right now having all the three streams (Arts, Science & Commerce).

The School celebrated its Golden Jubilee in 2014.

== Mission ==
The primary aim of Little Flower Higher Secondary School is to impart sound formation (religious, mental, moral, social and physical) based on the principles of Christian faith, to members of the Christian community.

It also imparts a sound formation (spiritual, mental, moral, social and physical) to all others admitted to this institution. The course of instruction comprises all the branches, recognised by the Nagaland Board of School Education and prepares the girls for the H.S.L.C and H.S.S.L.C. Examination conducted by the State Board.

== Notable alumni ==
- Andrea Kevichüsa, Model and Actress
- Vihozhonü Zao, State-level Basketball Player and Murder Victim

== See also ==
- List of higher education and academic institutions in Kohima
- List of schools in Nagaland
