= List of hospitals in Nagaland =

In Nagaland, there are 81 empanelled general hospitals (64 public and 17 private).

== List of hospitals in Nagaland ==
=== Kohima Metropolitan Area ===
Public

- Naga Hospital Authority
- Nagaland Institute of Medical Science and Research

Private

- Bethel Medical Center
- KOHIMAS Hospital
- KP Bethesda Hospital
- Oking Hospital and Research Clinic

=== Chümoukedima Metropolitan Area ===
Private

- Christian Institute of Health Sciences and Research (Referral Hospital)
- Olive Christian Hospital and Research Centre

=== Dimapur Metropolitan Area ===
Public

- Dimapur District Hospital

Private

- Eden Medical Centre and Research Centre
- Faith Hospital
- Metro Hospital
- Nikos Hospital and Research Centre
- Prime Hospital
- Zion Hospital and Research Centre
- Dimapur Hospital and Research Centre
