= Phezhu =

- Village
- Location of Phezhu Phezhu (India)
- Country: India
- State: Nagaland
- District: Kohima

Population (2011)
  - Total: 2,391

Languages
  - Official: English
- Time zone: UTC+5:30 (IST)
- Vehicle registration: NL-01
- Sex ratio: 997 ♂/♀

Phezhu is a village in Kohima district of Nagaland state of India.
