= Midland Ward =

- Ward under Kohima
- Location in Nagaland, India
- Coordinates: 25.666045°N 94.103784°E
- Country: India
- State: Nagaland
- City: Kohima
- Incorporated: 1970

Government
  - Type: Midland Council
  - Chairman: Kopelo Krome
- Time zone: UTC+5:30 (IST)

Midland Ward is a ward located under Nagaland's capital city, Kohima. The ward is sub-divided into three neighbourhoods: Upper Midland, Middle Midland and Lower Midland.

== Attractions ==
- Kohima War Cemetery

Kohima War Cemetery is a memorial dedicated to soldiers of the 2nd British Division of the Allied Forces who died in the Second World War at Kohima in April 1944. There are 1,420 Commonwealth burials of the Second World War at this cemetery.

- Kohima Ao Baptist Church

The Kohima Ao Baptist Church is one of the biggest churches in Kohima.

== Education ==
Educational Institutions in Midland Ward:

=== Schools ===
- Mezhür Higher Secondary School
- Government Middle School

=== Churches ===
- Phom Baptist Church Kohima
- Zeme Baptist Church Kohima
- Moa Baptist Church Kohima
- Nepali Baptist Church Kohima
- Konyak Baptist Church Kohima
- Lotha Baptist Church Kohima
- Rongmoi Baptist Church Kohima
- Khiamniungan Baptist Church Kohima

== Notable residents ==
- Neidonuo Angami, Social worker and one of the founders of the Naga Mothers' Association
- Lhüthiprü Vasa (d. 1993), Politician

== See also ==
- Municipal Wards of Kohima
