= 2022 Nagaland Olympic & Paralympic Games =

2nd Nagaland Olympic & Paralympic Games
- Host city: Kohima
- Country: India
- Motto: Stronger Together
- Athletes: 3500
- Opening: 22 August 2022
- Closing: 27 August 2022
- Opened by: Neiphiu Rio (Chief Minister of Nagaland)
- Closed by: Neiphiu Rio
- Main venue: Indira Gandhi Stadium

The 2nd Nagaland Olympic & Paralympic Games was a multi-sport event held from 22 to 27 August 2022 in Kohima, the capital of Nagaland. The participating delegations included 16 delegations from all districts under Nagaland. A total of 3,500 athletes from the 16 Districts of Nagaland competed in 11 sports and disciplines.

The Games were co-hosted by Dimapur and Longleng. Kohima led the final medal tally, followed by Phek in second place, and Dimapur in third place.

== Sports ==
There were a total of 11 sports at the 2nd Nagaland Olympic & Paralympic Games.

- Archery
- Athletics
- Badminton
- Basketball
- Boxing
- Football
- Shooting
- Taekwondo
- Table tennis
- Tennis

== Medal table ==
Rank	Delegation	Gold	Silver	Bronze	Total
1	Kohima	29	23	18	70
2	Phek	22	20	17	59
3	Dimapur	22	17	18	57
4	Noklak	8	6	4	18
5	Peren	8	4	12	24
6	Zünheboto	6	2	8	16
7	Mon	5	4	7	16
8	Chümoukedima	2	12	10	24
9	Wokha	2	4	13	19
10	Niuland	2	3	3	8
11	Longleng	1	0	1	2
12	Mokokchung	0	5	10	15
13	Shamator	0	5	4	9
14	Tseminyü	0	2	3	5
15	Kiphire	0	0	2	2
15	Tuensang	0	0	2	2
Totals (16 entries)		107	107	132	346
