= List of schools in Nagaland =

The following is a list of schools in Nagaland.

== Kohima District ==
=== Kohima ===
- Little Flower Higher Secondary School
- Mezhür Higher Secondary School
- Ministers' Hill Baptist Higher Secondary School

=== Viswema ===
- John Government Higher Secondary School

== Mokokchung District ==
=== Mokokchung ===
- Edith Douglas Higher Secondary School

== Zünheboto District ==
=== Zünheboto ===
- Immanuel Higher Secondary School

== See also ==
- List of institutions of higher education in Nagaland
- Lists of universities and colleges
- List of higher education and academic institutions in Kohima
- Education in Nagaland
