= Dimapur–Kohima Highway =

Road in Nagaland

Route information
- Part of NH 29 AH1 AH2
- Length: 42.48 km (26.40 mi)

Major junctions
- North West end: Dimapur
- South East end: Kohima

Location
- Country: India
- Major cities: Chümoukedima, Medziphema, Sechü Zubza

Highway system
- Roads in India; Expressways; National; State; Asian

The Dimapur–Kohima Highway is a tolled four lane dual carriageway in Nagaland that connects the state's largest city Dimapur and second largest city Kohima. Scheduled to be opened in 2021, the 42 km (26.1 mi) highway will reduce the travel time between Dimapur and Kohima from 2.5 hours to 1 hour.

== History ==
The project was first announced by the then-Prime Minister of India Atal Bihari Vajpayee in October 2003 during his visit to Nagaland.

In 2013, the construction of the four-lane National Highway 29 from Dimapur to Kohima was approved and road cutting works began in 2015.

== Future expansion ==
Future development plan entails extending the road from Kohima to Imphal from where it will be then extended to the existing roadway at Moreh on the India–Myanmar border to form part of the ambitious India–Myanmar–Thailand Trilateral Highway project.
