= Abraham Lotha =

Indian anthropologist

Principal of St. Joseph's College, Jakhama
- In office April 2011 – May 2015
- Preceded by: Isaac Padinjarekuttu
- Succeeded by: Sebastian Ousepparampil

Personal details
- Born: Nagaland
- Education: Columbia University (Ph.D.)

Abraham Lotha is an Indian anthropologist from Nagaland and the former Principal of St. Joseph's College, Jakhama, Nagaland who served from April 2011 till May 2015. He serves as the current president of the Lotha Academy and also wrote several books on Naga anthropology. Lotha is an ethnic Naga.

== Bibliography ==
- History of Naga Anthropology 1832–1947, 2007
- The Raging Mithun: Challenges of Naga Nationalism Christianity, 2013
- The Hornbill Spirit: Nagas Living Their Nationalism, 2016

== Accolades ==
In 2019, Abraham Lotha was awarded the Gordon Graham Prize for Naga Literature in the Non-Fiction category for his book, “The Hornbill Spirit: Nagas Living Their Nationalism”.
