= Kohima Women Police Station =

Women's police station in Kohima, Nagaland

Jurisdictional structure
- Governing body: Government of Nagaland

Operational structure
- Headquarters: Kohima, Nagaland, India
- Parent agency: Nagaland Police

Website
- police.nagaland.gov.in

Kohima Women Police Station is a women's police station in Kohima in the Indian state of Nagaland. It functions under the Nagaland Police and serves the Kohima District. The station was adjudged the best-performing police station in Nagaland in 2021.

== Recognition ==
In the Ministry of Home Affairs' Annual Ranking of Police Stations for 2021, Kohima Women Police Station was adjudged the best-performing police station in Nagaland. Out of 16,955 police stations evaluated across India, the station was among 74 shortlisted nationally and received a Certificate of Excellence from the Ministry of Home Affairs. The award was presented by Director General of Police T. John Longkumer on 6 May 2022. It was the only women's police station in India included in the national shortlist.

== See also ==
- Kohima North Police Station
