= Sazolie College =

College in Nagaland

- Motto: Rise Ever Higher
- Established: 2005; 21 years ago
- Academic affiliations: Nagaland University
- Principal: Kangzangding Thou
- Location: Jotsoma, Kohima District, Nagaland, India; 25.660°N 94.078°E
- Campus: Urban
- Website: sazoliecollege.in

Sazolie College, is a college in Jotsoma, Kohima District, Nagaland, India. The college was established in 2005. It offers undergraduate courses in arts and is affiliated to Nagaland University.

== Departments ==
=== Arts ===
- English
- History
- Political Science
- Sociology
- Education
- Psychology

== Extra curricular activities ==
In May 2022, Sazolie College organized the first ever intercollegiate Naga Wrestling competition in Nagaland at Indira Gandhi Stadium, Kohima. A total of 29 wrestlers from 13 colleges participated in the one day sporting event.

== Accreditation ==
The college is recognized by the University Grants Commission (UGC).
