= Christian Institute of Health Sciences and Research =

Coordinates: 25.860884°N 93.779904°E

Geography
- Location: 4th Mile, Chümoukedima, Nagaland, India

Organisation
- Type: General

Services
- Beds: 300

History
- Founded: 1988; 38 years ago

Links
- Website: cihsr.in
- Lists: Hospitals in India

Christian Institute of Health Sciences and Research (CIHSR) is a medical institute and hospital located in Chümoukedima, Nagaland, India. Founded in 1988 as the Referral Hospital. In 2006, the hospital was handed over to the Christian Medical College and Emmanuel Hospital Association and the Government of Nagaland under a tripartite MoU partnership agreement and was renamed the Christian Institute of Health Sciences and Research. The campus is situated on a land area of 130 acres and is the largest medical center in Nagaland.

== History ==
Founded as the Referral Hospital in 1988.

In 2006, the Referral Hospital was handed over to the Emmanuel Hospital Association and Christian Medical College by the Government of Nagaland under a tripartite partnership agreement and the hospital was renamed to Christian Institute of Health Sciences and Research. It started functioning its service in November 2007.

== Access ==
The CIHSR Campus is located 1.5 km (0.93 mi) from 4th Mile Junction on the NH-29 (AH1) in the Chümoukedima District in Nagaland, India.

== Notable patients ==
- Several injured victims of the 2021 Oting incident underwent treatment at the Referral Hospital.

== See also ==
- List of hospitals in Nagaland
