= St. Joseph's College, Jakhama =

College in Nagaland, India

St. Joseph's College (Autonomous), Jakhama
- Coat of Arms
- Motto: Arise and Shine
- Established: 1985; 41 years ago
- Affiliations: Autonomous
- Principal: George Keduolhou Angami
- Academic staff: 94
- Students: 3840 (as of 2019)
- Location: Jakhama, Kohima District, Nagaland; 25.579°N 94.125°E
- Campus: Urban 200 hectares (2.0 km^{2})
- Colors: Blue
- Website: stjosephjakhama.ac.in

St. Joseph's College (Autonomous), Jakhama, is a college established and managed by the Diocese of Kohima, Nagaland. It is the first college established by the Catholic Church in Nagaland and is located in the southern part of the Kohima Metropolitan Area at Jakhama.

As of 2019, there are 3840 students (3676 U.G and 164 P.G) making it the largest college in Nagaland. According to Education World's ‘India Autonomous Colleges Rankings 2020–2021’, the college was ranked 1st among the private autonomous colleges in North East India and 56th in India.

== Campus ==
The college's main campus covers an area of approximately 200 Hectares (2 km^{2}) situated on the NH-2 at Jakhama in the Southern Angami region of Kohima District which is located about 18 kilometers from Kohima city.

=== Main Building ===
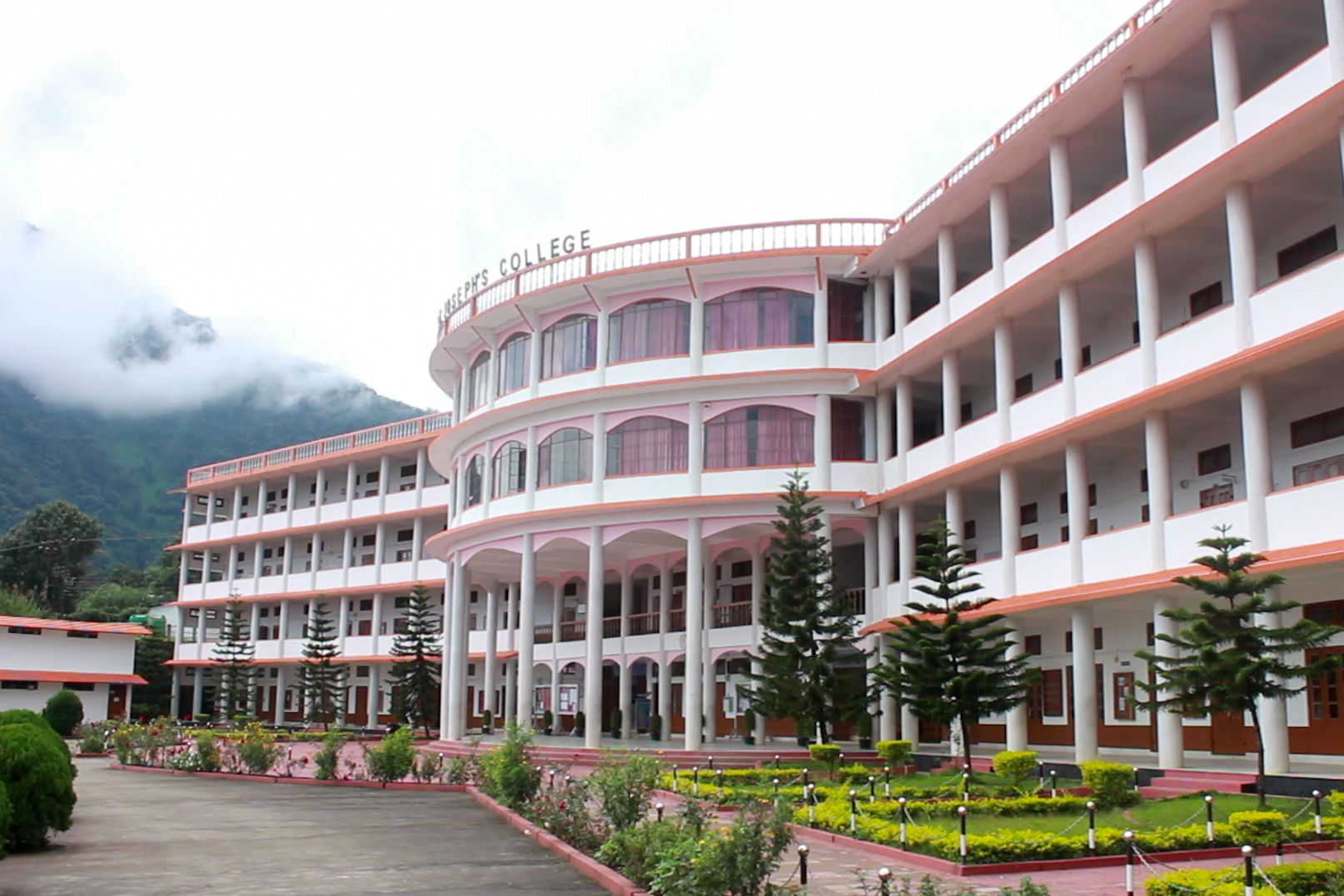
SJC Arts Block

Constructed between 2004 and 2010, it is also known as the 'Silver Jubilee Memorial Building' or the 'Arts Block' for it houses mainly the Arts classrooms. The Main Building also houses the offices of the Principal, Vice Principal (Academic affairs), Vice Principal (Students' affairs), Administrator and the Students' Council along with the college library, Conference Hall and other offices of the various departments of the college.

=== Pope Francis Science Block ===
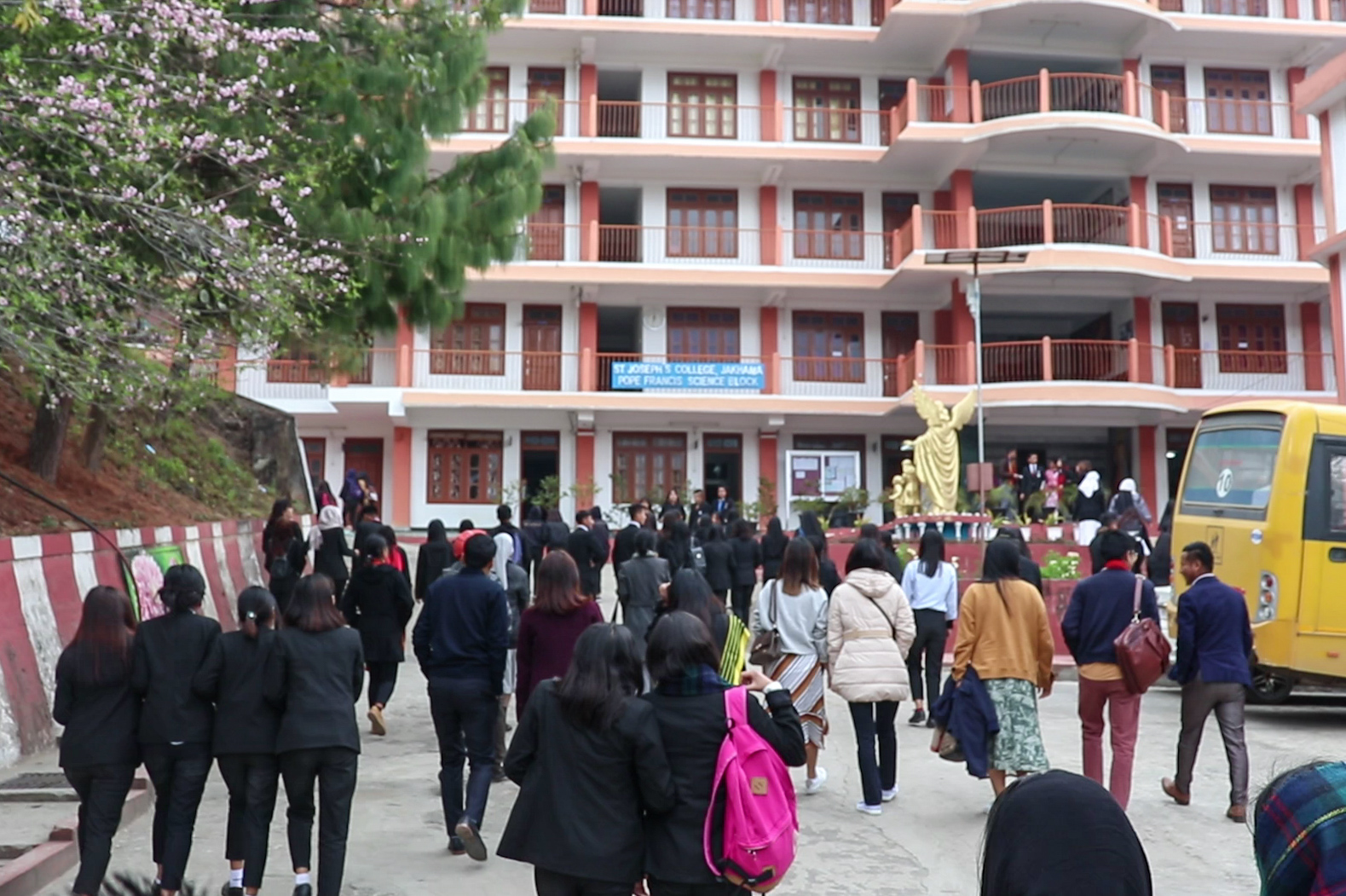
Partial view of the SJC Science Block

Although called the Science Block, it also houses the classrooms of BBA and Commerce students.

Due to the increasing number of students each year, the new building was constructed between 2013 and 2015 to accommodate the Science students but later included the classrooms of BBA and Commerce. It also houses the office of the 'Dean of Science' and the college laboratory.

=== Bishop Abraham Memorial Indoor Stadium ===
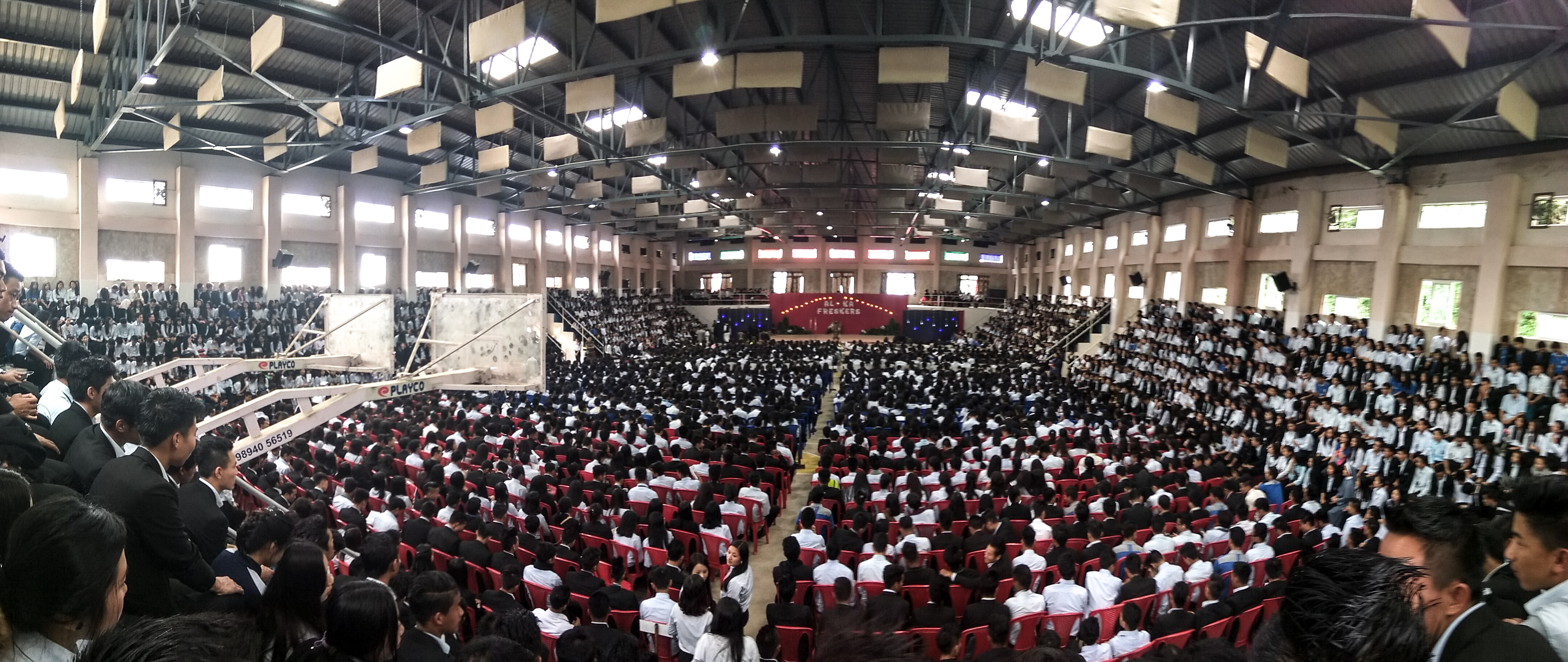
Panoramic view of the SJC Indoor Stadium

The Bishop Abraham Memorial Indoor Stadium is mainly used for formal programmes and events besides various sports activities like Basketball, Badminton, Volleyball, etc. It can accommodate over 4000 people during events of the college.

=== Hostels ===
There are four hostels located inside the college's main campus which can accommodate over 1500 students.

- SJC Men's Hostel
- Adoration Women's Hostel
- Ave Maria Women's Hostel
- CMC Women's Hostel

=== PG Block ===
The Post Graduate Block is currently under construction.

== History ==
The college was inaugurated on 19 March 1985 at the Loyola School Campus, Jakhama, under the administration of the society of Jesus, with Pre-University Courses in Arts (including a Vocational Course) and Commerce. It was affiliated to the North Eastern Hill University, Shillong, in the same year. The college is now located in a spacious campus west of Jakhama. Degree Courses in Arts (Bachelor of Arts) and in Commerce (Bachelor of Commerce) were started in 1988. The college was affiliated to the Nagaland University with the establishment of a university within the State of Nagaland in July 1994.

In 2018, the college was conferred to Autonomous status by the University Grants Commission (UGC).

=== Principals ===
Principal	From	To
Rev. Fr. Francis Vazhapilly S.J.	March 1985	March 1991
Rev. Dr. Fr. Francis Rebello S.J.	April 1991	December 1991
Rev. Dr. Fr. Hector D'Souza S.J.	January 1992	April 1993
Rev. Dr. Fr. K. C. George S.J.	May 1993	December 1993
Rev. Fr. Gregory Coelho S.J.	January 1994	December 1996
Rev. Fr. Antony Cheenkallel	January 1997	June 1999
Rev. Dr. Fr. Alphonsus D'Souza S.J.	July 1999	December 1999
Rev. Fr. N. K. George	January 2000	March 2003
Rev. Dr. Fr. George P. Mathew	April 2003	July 2006
Rev. Dr. Fr. Isaac Padinjarekuttu	October 2006	April 2011
Rev. Dr. Fr. Abraham Lotha	April 2011	May 2015
Rev. Dr. Fr. Sebastian Ousepparampil	May 2015	February 2021
Fr. Dr. George Keduolhou Angami	February 2021	Incumbent

== Academics ==
- Department of BBA
- Department of Botany
- Department of Chemistry
- Department of Commerce
- Department of Economics
- Department of Education
- Department of English

Established in 1994, the Department of English, as of 2019 has an enrollment of about 400 students.

- Department of History

The Department of History was established in the year 1994. As of 2019, it is the second largest department in the college with a total enrollment of about 600 students.

- Department of Political Science

The Department of Political Science or popularly referred to as 'Polasso or The Polassos' was established in the year 1994. As of 2019, it is the largest department in the college with a total enrollment of about 700 students.

- Department of Sociology

The Department of Sociology was established in the year 1994. As of 2019, it has an enrollment of about 300 students.

- Department of Zoology

== Student life ==
=== Extra curricular activities ===
- Spring Fest

Spring Fest is an annual social and cultural festival held during the month of March. The two-day festival attracts students between 3500 and 4000 each year.

The festival is organised by the Innovators Club in collaboration with the SJCJ Students' Council.

- College Week

The College Week is a week long Sports and Socio-Cultural event held annually during the last week of November.

- Eureka Science Fest

Held annually during the month of July. The Eureka Science Fest is an Inter-College Science festival where participants from other colleges takes part. The event is organised by the Department of Science.

- Convergence

Convergence is an annual Inter-College Social event organized annually during the month of August by the Department of BBA.

=== Awards ===
- Governor's Gold Medal

The Governor's Gold Medal was instituted by his Excellency, the late Dr. M. M. Thomas, the Governor of Nagaland in the year 1990. It was conferred to the Best Graduate of the year. It was conferred for the first time at first Graduation Day on 22 August 1990.

- Chikrophuyo Memorial Award

The Chikrophuyo Memorial Award was instituted in the year 1994 in honour of late Chikrophuyo, a B.A Honours student in Political Science. It was instituted by his family and is conferred to the best B.A Student of the Year who secures the highest percentage of marks in the University Examinations giving due regard to attendance and character.

- Avica Achümi Memorial Award

Avica Achümi Memorial Award was instituted in 1999 in honour of late Avica Achümi who expired in July 1998. Sponsored by G. Vinton Achümi, the father of late Avica Achümi. It is awarded to the best B.Com student of the year who secures the highest percentage of marks in the University Examinations giving due regards to attendance and character.

- Best BBA Student Award

The Best BBA Student Award was instituted in the year 2018 by the college. It is awarded to the best BBA student of the Year and carries a memento, a citation and a personal gift.

- Best Science Student Award

The Best Science Student Award was instituted in the year 2015 by the college. It is awarded to the best Science student of the year and it carries a memento, a citation and a personal gift.

- APJ Abdul Kalam Award

A. P. J. Abdul Kalam Award was instituted by Governor Padmanabha Acharya, the then Governor of Nagaland during the Graduation Day in 2015. It is award for best Academic Performance. It carries a memento, a medal, a personal gift and a citation.

- Dr. Talimeren Ao Award

Dr. Talimeren Ao Award was instituted by the then Governor of Nagaland, Padmanabha Acharya, during the Graduation Day in 2015. It is awarded for the Best Sports Person. It carries a memento, a personal gift and a citation.

- Mahatma Gandhi Award

Mahatma Gandhi Award was instituted by the then Governor of Nagaland, Padmanabha Acharya during the Graduation Day in 2015. It is awarded for best Overall Performance. It carries a memento, a medal, a personal gift and a citation.

- Alumni Association Award

The Alumni Association Award was instituted in the year 2004, by the Alumni Association of the college. It is awarded to the best General Student of the year and it carries a cash prize, a citation and a personal gift.

== Students' council ==
The St. Joseph's College, Jakhama Students' Council (SJCJSC) is the apex students' body of the college. The council is officially recognised by the college administration as the sole umbrella organisation of all student in the college.

=== Presidents ===
List of presidents
Year	Name	Notes
2026	Atsamong Sangtam	
2025	Paukam Phom	
2024	Wansham B. Phom	
2023	Atsali Langkithonger	
2022	M. Shamba Phom	
2021	Yangthingba Mongzar	
2020	N/A	(Note: The 2020 SJC Students' Council Election was scheduled for June 2020, but was cancelled due to the COVID-19 pandemic.)
2019	Chumtiba S. Sangtam	
2018	Weneizo Mero	
2017	T. Yingnyü Mosa	
2016	Yanphong Konyak	
2015	Yanghose Rüdithonger	
2014	Njulo Kent	
2013	Menosele Yhoshü	
2012	Pelamdibo Nchang	
2011	Kelengol Neikha	
2010	Mathew L. Konyak	
2009	Visüto Samuel Tsükrü	
2008	Kelühol Tase	
2007	Phikihe P. Achümi	
2006	Kevisatuo Angami	
2005	Keleseho Stephen Tsükrü	
2004	Petekhrietuo Keyho	
2003	Thejangulie Zhasa	
2002	Ketoupuzo Lhoushe	
2001	Athozo Tase	
2000	Lanu Yapang	
1999	Xavier Solo	
1998	Mezievito Mathew	
1997	Zevikho Tase	
1996	Rokovizo Meze	
1995	Vikheto Swu	
1994	Kezhazer Bernick	
1993	Viphrezo Angami	
1992	Visato John Koso	
1991	Kikovi Kharütso	
1990	Puthavil Neikha	
1989	Nohol Rhetso	
1988	Puthavil Neikha	
1986	Khriesato Kenneth	
1985	Khrievozo Martin Dzüvichü	

== Library ==
The library has a total collection of 19,165 including text book related curriculum material, inspiration, information and reference books like Encyclopedia, Yearbook, Dictionaries, supplement to Encyclopedia, Geographical sources, Directories, Handbook and Manual, etc.

== Transportation ==
The college provides 24 buses pressed into regular bus service to commute students and staffs.

In addition there are private buses and taxis travelling to and from other parts of Kohima district.

== Notable alumni and faculty members ==
St. Joseph's alumni are called ‘Josephites’. The college has produced a sizeable number of notable personalities in varied fields, both academic and otherwise. An individual may be associated with two or more colleges, as an undergraduate, postgraduate and/or member of staff.

=== List of notable Josephite ===
- Viseyie Koso, Sportsperson
- Abraham Lotha, Former Principal and Anthropologist
- N. Bongkhao Konyak, Politician
- Vihozhonü Zao, State-level Basketball Player and Murder Victim
