= Mengujüma =

- Village
- Country: India
- Region: Northeast India
- State: Nagaland
- District: Kohima district

Population (2011)
  - Total: 537
  - Official: English
- Time zone: UTC+5:30 (IST)
- PIN: 797002
- Website: nagaland.nic.in

Mengujüma is a Angami Naga village in the Kohima district of Nagaland.

== Demographics ==
Mengujüma is in the Kohima District of Nagaland. Per the population census 2011, there are a total 116 households in Mengujüma. The total population of Mengujüma is 537.

== See also ==
- Kohima district
