= Shokhüvi railway station =

Railway station in Nagaland India

Shokhüvi
- Indian Railways logo

General information
- Location: Shokhüvi, Chümoukedima District, Nagaland; India
- Coordinates: 25°45′37″N 93°42′45″E
- Elevation: 184.7 metres (606 ft)
- System: Indian Railways station
- Owner: Indian Railways
- Operator: Northeast Frontier Railway
- Line: Dhansiri–Zubza line
- Platforms: 2
- Tracks: 3

Construction
- Structure type: Standard (on-ground station)
- Parking: Yes
- Accessible: Disabled access

Other information
- Status: functioning
- Station code: SKHV
- Zone(s): Northeast Frontier Railway
- Division(s): Lumding

History
- Opened: 2021
Location

Shokhüvi Railway Station, coded SHKV, is a railway station in Chümoukedima District, Nagaland. It serves as a station for the Chümoukedima Metropolitan Area. The station consists of two platforms and three tracks. It is the first railway station opened on the Dhansiri–Zubza line.

== Trains ==
The trains originating at Shokhüvi:

- 15617 Shokhüvi–Naharlagun Donyi Polo Express
- 55606 Shokhuvi–Guwahati Passenger

== See also ==
- List of railway stations in Nagaland
- Dhansiri–Zubza line
- Kohima Zubza Railway Station
