= Kohima Zubza railway station =

Railway station in the Indian state of Nagaland

Kohima Zubza Railway Station

General information
- Location: Sechü Zubza, Kohima District, Nagaland; India
- System: Regional rail station
- Owner: Indian Railways
- Operator: Northeast Frontier Railway
- Line: Dhansiri–Zubza line

Construction
- Parking: Yes
- Accessible: Yes

Other information
- Status: Under construction
- Station code: ZUBA
- Zone(s): Northeast Frontier Railway
- Division(s): Lumding railway division
- Interactive map
- 25°43′25″N 94°02′38″E
Location

Kohima Zubza Railway Station coded ZUBA is a railway station currently under construction in Kohima District of Nagaland in India, which will serve Kohima, the capital of Nagaland on the Dhansiri–Zubza line.

== History ==
An extension of the railway line from Dimapur to Kohima was proposed and surveyed in 2009. Due to a dispute over land acquisition, the track was resurveyed and an alternative alignment was proposed in 2013 and is expected to be completed by 2020.

== Current status ==
The 123-kilometre (76 mi)-long Dimapur–Zubza–Kohima new line project has the status of a National Project. Final location survey has been completed for the entire project.

As of August 2019, the 25% work on the 82.5 km line from Dimapur to Zubza near Kohima has been completed, railway has requested the Nagaland Government to expedite the land acquisition process which is holding up progress on this rail link.

== See also ==
- List of railway stations in Nagaland
