= Neidonuo Angami =

Indian social worker

Padma Shri Neidonuo Angami
- Born: Neidonuo Dzüvichü; 1 October 1950 (age 75); Kohima, Nagaland, India
- Occupation: Social worker
- Awards: Padma Shri

Neidonuo Dzüvichü (born 1 October 1950) is an Indian social worker and one of the founders of the Naga Mothers' Association, a non governmental organization working for remedying the social problems in Nagaland, India. She is reported to have been selected as one of the 1000 women shortlisted for the Nobel Peace Prize for 2005. She was honored by the Government of India, in 2000, with the fourth highest Indian civilian award of Padma Shri.

== Biography ==
I feel that my biggest achievement has been in spreading awareness among women in helping them root out drug abuse and alcoholism. It took time to reach the grassroot level. As we have many tribes in Nagaland, the tribal women’s organisations are our backbone, says Angami.

Neidonuo Dzüvichü was born on 1 October 1950 in Kohima, the capital of the Northeast Indian state of Nagaland. She lost her father, who was a government official killed by the Naga insurgents, at the age of six and was brought up by her mother. Due to financial difficulty, Angami started her schooling late, at the age of eight, at the Mezhür Higher Secondary School, erstwhile Cambridge School, and later continued at two other schools in Kohima, Baptist English School and the Government High School and passed the matriculation in 1968. Her college education was at the Kohima College from where she passed the Pre University Course and started her career as a Sub Inspector in the Kohima Police Force. However, she did not stay at the job for long. In 1972, she started working as a teacher and became active in social work by founding the Nagaland Weavers’ Association.

In 1984, Angami, along with a few other Naga women, formed the Naga Mothers' Association (NMA) to work against the social problems of drug addiction and alcoholism. The organization was planned as a platform for the women of various Naga ethnic groups for social activism and Angami was elected as its first general secretary. She has also served as its president for two terms.

Angami is reported to have contributed to the formation of several satellite organizations of NMA such as NMA Youth and Women Welfare Organization in 1986, Mt Gilead Home in 1989, a shelter home and rehabilitation center for drug addicts and alcoholics, and the NMA HIV/AIDS Care Hospice in 2001, a subsidiary project for the shelter home for recycling paper. She is also known to have launched a social movement, Shed No More Blood, a campaign which provided the insurgents an opportunity to interact with the mainstream politics. Seeking assistance of other social and tribal organizations such as Naga HoHo, Naga Students' Federation, and Naga People’s Movement for Human Rights, NMA was successful in brokering a ceasefire between the insurgents and the government. The organization also assisted in giving a proper burial for the casualties of the fight. She has also represented NMA in many peace talks held at Thailand, New Delhi and Nagaland. Honouring its efforts, the organization was awarded the Times of India Social Impact Award in 2013.

In 2000, Angami, under the aegis of NMA, launched an initiative called Journey of Conscience, where the leaders of the organization met with other civil and social groups, media, student organizations, educationists and politicians for exchanging views. Angami and the organization also arranged for its members to acquire skills through training sessions, workshops and seminars. She has attended several such programs in India and abroad.

Neidonuo Angami is married and has three daughters and a son . The Government of India honoured Angami, in 2000, by including her in the Republic Day honours list for the award of Padma Shri. Later in 2005, she is reported to have been shortlisted as one of the 1000 women for the Nobel Peace Prize.

== See also ==
- Insurgency in Northeast India
- National Socialist Council of Nagaland
