= Naga Hospital Authority =

Coordinates: 25.669886°N 94.095927°E

Naga Hospital Authority, Kohima

Geography
- Location: Naga Hospital Ward, Kohima, Nagaland, India

Organisation
- Type: General
- Affiliated university: Nagaland Medical College

Services
- Beds: 300

History
- Founded: 1905; 121 years ago

Links
- Lists: Hospitals in India

Naga Hospital Authority, Kohima (NHAK) is a government-run tertiary hospital in Kohima, Nagaland.

== History ==
It was established in 1905 as a ten-bedded dispensary. The foundation for the present hospital was laid after the Second World War. Villages in and around Kohima participated in levelling the ground. The occasion continued the tradition of kene (wrestling) competitions between the volunteers, from villages and communities, as friendly contests between work time.

The dispensary was then upgraded to Kohima Civil Hospital with 60 beds. It was later renamed as Naga Hospital Authority. The hospital was conferred to autonomous status in 2003 through the Naga Hospital Authority Bill by the Government of Nagaland.

== Courses ==
=== Nursing ===
Previously, the Government of Nagaland's Department of Health and Family Welfare ran the 'General Nursing and Midwifery (GNM) course at the hospital's School of Nursing which completed 75 years in 2024. The course was discontinued starting in 2025-26 as the school was upgraded to a college. Starting in 2025, this College of Nursing started a new B.Sc. (Nursing) degree with an intake of 20 students. The admission was conducted through the Combined University Entrance Test (CUET-UG), and seats were announced through the Directorate of Technical Education.

== Certifications ==
In 2011, the hospital became the first in Nagaland to achieve the certification of International Organization for Standardization (ISO) 9001:2008 given by the Indian Register Quality System which was undertaken with technical support of National Health System Resource Centre under NRHM.

== See also ==
- List of hospitals in Nagaland
