= Naga Mothers' Association =

Civil society organisation

- Abbreviation: NMA
- Formation: 14 February 1984; 42 years ago
- Legal status: Active
- Headquarters: Kohima, Nagaland, India
- President: Vilanuo Angela Yhome
- Motto: Human Integrity

The Naga Mothers' Association (NMA) is a civil society organisation formed by women in Nagaland. The organisation has consistently tried to address problems of conflict, peace building and substance abuse by creating a platform for dialogue that brings together disparate voices.

Ever since its formation, through the 80s and 90s, NMA have consistently voiced their opinion against fratricidal killings, violence between different Naga outfits such as NSCN (I-M) and NSCN (K), and the Indian security forces. The current president of the Naga Mothers' Association is Vilanuo Angela Yhome.

== History ==
The Naga Mothers' Association, NMA was established in 1984 in Kohima, against the backdrop of the Ethnic Conflict in Nagaland Conflict, rampant alcoholism, and drug problems. For women in Nagaland, the NMA became an umbrella organisation, which brought together the women's wings of different Naga ethnic groups like, the Angamis, the Aos, etc. Neidonuo Angami was one of the founding members of NMA. Popularly known as the 'mother of peace', she served as its general secretary from 1984 to 1994. Drug addiction was a rampant problem in Nagaland during the 1980s. This brought together women from different works of life to fight this menace. In the 1990s, the NMA also played a pioneering role in tackling HIV and AIDS. "In the beginning, the biggest issue affecting homes was drug addiction," according to Abei-u Meru, a founder and former NMA president. "The mothers came together because it was hurting every home.", adds Meru.

=== Operations ===
The constitution of NMA allows every adult Naga woman to be automatically made a member on payment of a token annual membership fee of one Rupee. Different Naga ethnic groups nominate members from within to be leaders of NMA. Along with spreading information, NMA started a rehabilitation centre. The NMA organises workshops and training programmes for women across the state on a range of relevant issues. They also work towards economic empowerment of Naga women They proactively advocate against the recruitment of children by underground military outfits. The NMA successfully mediated talks between the Nagaland government and the Naga Students' Federation over age limit for jobs. In October 1994, the NMA formed a peace team to arrest the situation of rising violence and political instability in the state.

=== Against Drugs and Alcoholism ===
Since the early 80s, drug-addiction was a rampant problem in the North-East which affected the states' young people adversely. One of the main reasons behind this was the area's proximity to the Golden Triangle from where drugs were transported. Economic and social problems and a lax government machinery also exacerbated the problem. The Naga Mother's Association runs a detoxification and counselling centre at Kohima in collaboration with the Kripa Foundation. As observed in a study conducted by Patra and Manna (2008), 'They tried to make the women aware of the danger of these social evils and motivate them to establish a good Naga society'.

=== On Peace and Conflict ===
The NMA has played an important role in attempting to bring different rebel outfits to peace talks. In 1994, the NMA started a peace building effort through its, 'Shed No More Blood' campaign and it remains the guiding force of the peace efforts undertaken by them. The campaign is based on the motto of human integrity and considers the value of each life as sacred. As part of the campaign, the NMA wrapped all unclaimed bodies in traditional shawls, whether they belonged to the 'Nagas' or the Indian security forces. Former Home Secretary, GK Pillai who was instrumental to the Indo-Naga peace pact of 1997, recalls the power of this slogan as one being evocative, coming as it did from the mothers who had felt the pain of child bearing and child rearing and then lost their children to the armed conflict. He believes that the movement played a key role in catalysing the peace process.

==== 2010 Mao Gate Incident ====
In 2010, two young Nagas were shot dead by the Manipur commandos during clashes that arose during the visit of NSCN (I-M) leader, Thuingaleng Muivah to the Ukhrul district of Manipur. The Naga Mothers' Association members made the effort to recover the unclaimed dead bodies and hand them over to their families.

=== For Ethnic Unity ===
The NMA believes in a space of dialogue and consultation on contentious issues like ethnic unity. During a conflict that arose concerning a local Rongmei community, the NMA urged ethnic leaders and the Naga village council (Naga Hoho) for "unity against divisive forces from within and without, and work together in peace and greater understanding for the future of the Nagas". As mentioned in the study by conducted by Patra and Manna (2008), 'The role of women as arbitrators is quite recognised and accepted. They assert their role so as to prevent the conflicting Nagas from self destruction'.

=== For Women's Reservation ===
The NMA fights for more representation of women in politics and decision making in the public sphere. Currently the NMA is fighting a case in India's Supreme Court pushing for a 33% reservation for women in local polls. The organisation believes that such reservation is not in conflict with customary law.

=== Against HIV and AIDS ===
The NMA led the destigmatisation movement against HIV-AIDS patients in 1991. As a part of the movement, members of the NMA held hands with HIV-positive inmates from the Manipur jail.

== Awards and recognition ==
- Times of India Social Impact Award for life contribution for 2013.

== See also ==
- Angami Women Organisation
