= Jotsoma =

- Village
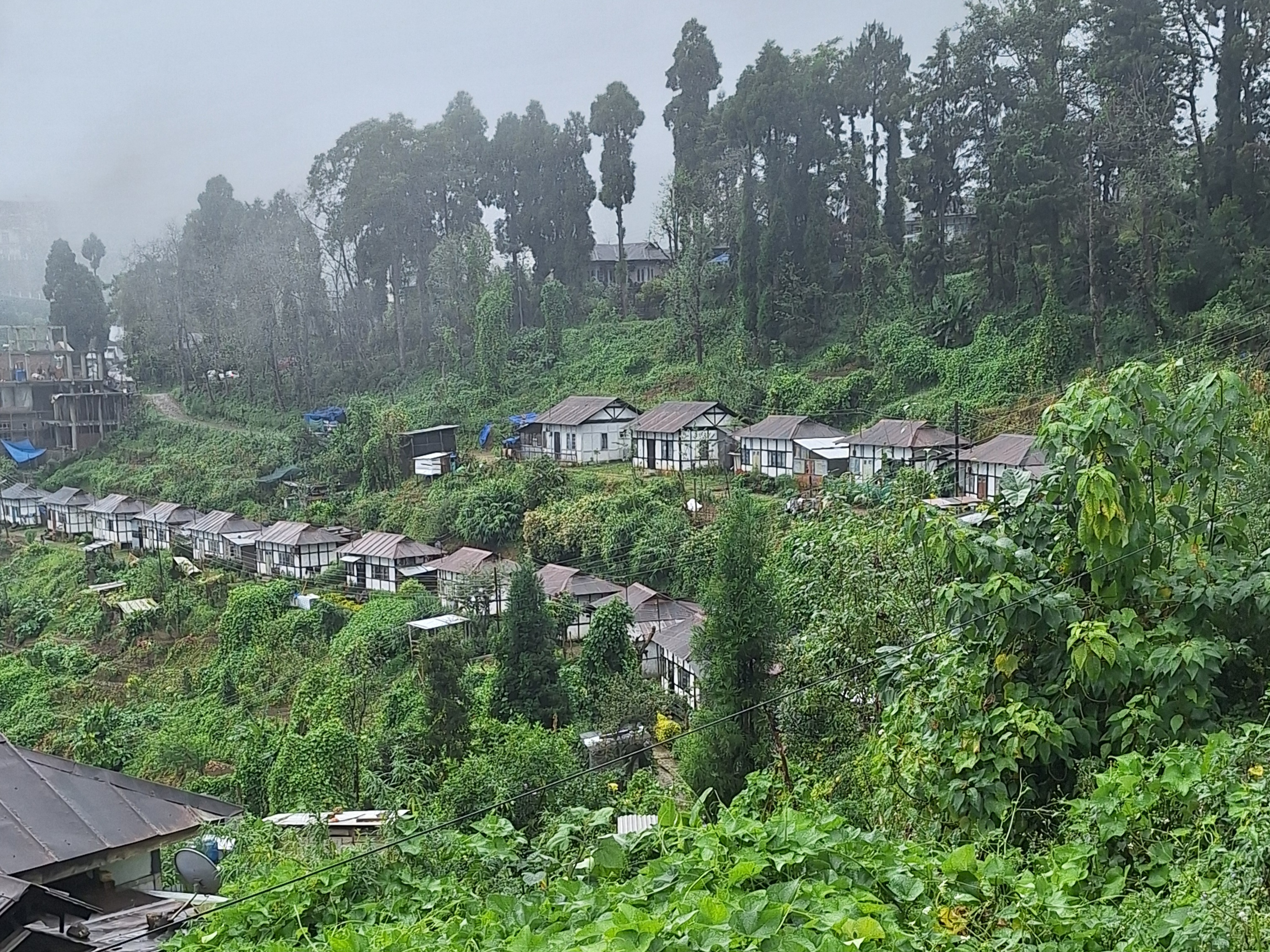
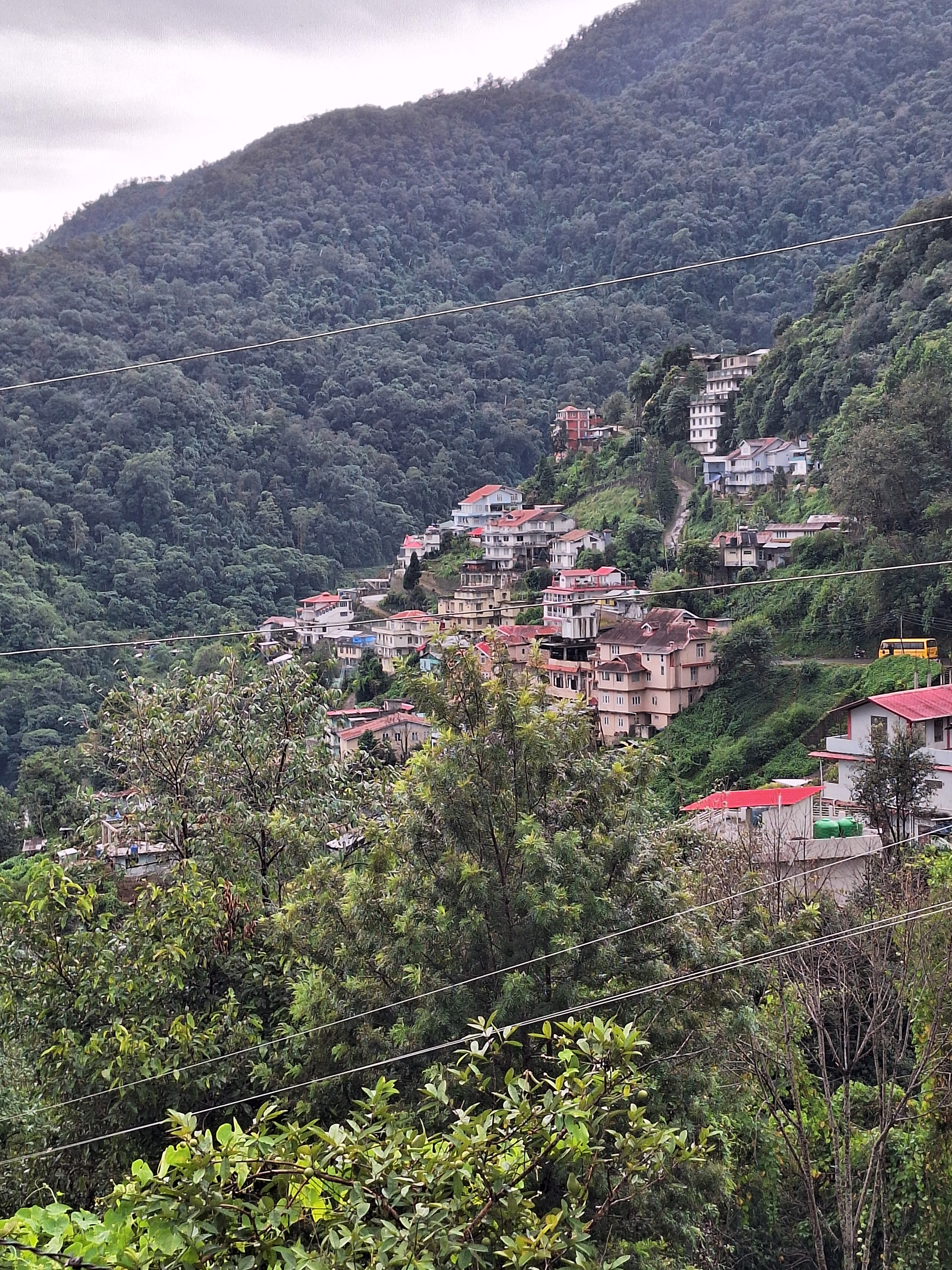
- Jotsoma village View from Science College Rd

- Location of Jotsoma Jotsoma (India)
- Coordinates: 25°40′25″N 94°3′45″E
- Country: India
- Region: Northeast India
- State: Nagaland
- District: Kohima District

Population (2011)
  - Total: 2,458

Languages
  - Official: English
- Time zone: UTC+5:30 (IST)
- Vehicle registration: NL-01
- Sex ratio: 952 ♂/♀

Jotsoma is an Angami Naga village located about eight kilometres (5.0 mi) west from the state capital, Kohima. The total population of the village is about 2,458. Kohima Science College, Doordharshan Kendra Kohima, Water Supply Reservoir (Public Health Engineering), Sazolie College and Regional Centre of Excellence for Music & Performing Arts (RCEMPA) are located on the hilltop of Jotsoma village. Pulie Badze stands at an elevation of 2,296-metre (7,533 ft) above sea level.
