= Nagaland Board of School Education =

Indian state organisation

- Abbreviation: NBSE
- Formation: 15 November 1973; 52 years ago
- Type: Governmental Board of School Education
- Headquarters: Kohima, Nagaland, India
- Location: Nagaland, India
- Official language: English
- Chairperson: Rangumbuing Nsarangbe (Addl. Charge)
- Secretary: Rangumbuing Nsarangbe
- Affiliations: 734 schools (2025)
- Website: Official website

Nagaland Board of School Education (abbreviated as NBSE) is a board of school education in the state of Nagaland, India. The board is established under Act No.4 of the Nagaland State Legislative Assembly 1973 on 15 November 1973, the board started functioning from 1 October 1974 covering the whole of Nagaland within its ambit.

== Objectives ==
The Nagaland Board of School Education is basically instituted:

- To prescribe courses of instruction for examinations,
- To prescribe conditions of examinations, conduct examinations and be responsible for making necessary arrangements for the same,
- To publish the results of external examinations,
- To prepare the curricula, syllabus and textbooks in accordance with the approved courses of study.

Some of its functions are:

- To guide the State Government on development of school education - secondary and higher secondary level.
- To adopt reforms in examinations and evaluation practices.
- To inspect schools to ascertain attainment of standards.
- To organise seminars, workshops for teachers and heads of institutions.

== See also ==
- Central Board of Secondary Education
- Indian Certificate of Secondary Education
- National Institute of Open Schooling
