= Khaibung =

- Village
- Country: India
- Region: Northeast India
- State: Nagaland
- District: Chümoukedima District

Population (2011)
  - Total: 437
  - Official: English
- Time zone: UTC+5:30 (IST)
- PIN: 797106
- Website: nagaland.nic.in

Khaibung is a Kuki village located in the Chümoukedima District of Nagaland.

== Demographics ==
Khaibung is situated in the Chümoukedima District of Nagaland. As per the Population Census 2011, there are a total 87 households in Khaibung. The total population of Khaibung is 437.

== See also ==
- Chümoukedima District
