= Nagaland Institute of Medical Science and Research =

Medical college and hospital in Kohima, India

- Other names: NIMSR; Kohima Medical College
- Former names: Nagaland Medical College
- Type: Medical College; Research institute
- Established: 2022; 4 years ago
- Affiliations: Nagaland University, NMC
- Chairman: Chief Minister of Nagaland
- Director: Dr. Soumya Chakraborty
- Location: Phriebagie, Kohima, Nagaland, India 25.694874°N 94.123643°E
- Campus: Urban
- Website: nimsr.nagaland.gov.in

Nagaland Institute of Medical Science and Research (NIMSR), popularly known as Kohima Medical College, is a medical college and hospital in Kohima in the Indian state of Nagaland. It is the first Medical College in the Indian state of Nagaland. On 25 April 2023, National Medical Commission has given the Letter of Permission (LoP) for 100 MBBS seats to start the medical college under Nagaland University, Kohima for the Academic Year 2023–2024.

== History ==
The Central government in February 2014, gave its nod for the creation of a medical College with Central and State government taking 90% and 10% of the expenses respectively. The Central government sanctioned 189 crores rupees for the construction. The foundation for Nagaland Medical College was laid by the Chief Minister of Nagaland Neiphiu Rio in 2014 The sanctioned amount was received in 2015 but construction could not take off due to land issue. In 2018, the land issue was resolved and the land needed for the medical institute was handed over to the government. In September 2023, the institute began classes at full capacity with 100 students.
