= Molvom =

- Village
- Country: India
- Region: Northeast India
- State: Nagaland
- District: Chümoukedima District

Population (2011)
  - Total: 1,391
  - Official: English
- Time zone: UTC+5:30 (IST)
- PIN: 797106
- Website: nagaland.nic.in

Molvom is a Kuki village located in the Chümoukedima District of Nagaland.

== Demographics ==
Molvom is situated in the Chümoukedima District of Nagaland. As per the Population Census 2011, there are a total 241 households in Molvom. The total population of Molvom is 1391.

== See also ==
- Chümoukedima District
