= Sechü Zubza =

Sechü–Zubza
- Town
- Location of Sechü–Zubza Sechü–Zubza (India)
- Coordinates: 25.715°N 94.0365°E
- Country: India
- State: Nagaland
- District: Kohima

Population (2011)
  - Total: 4,460

Languages
  - Official: English
- Time zone: UTC+5:30 (IST)
- Vehicle registration: NL-01
- Sex ratio: 473 ♂/♀

Sechü-Zubza is a town in the Kohima District of the Indian state of Nagaland. It is located 17 km north-west of Kohima, the capital of Nagaland.
