= Kohima district =

- District of Nagaland
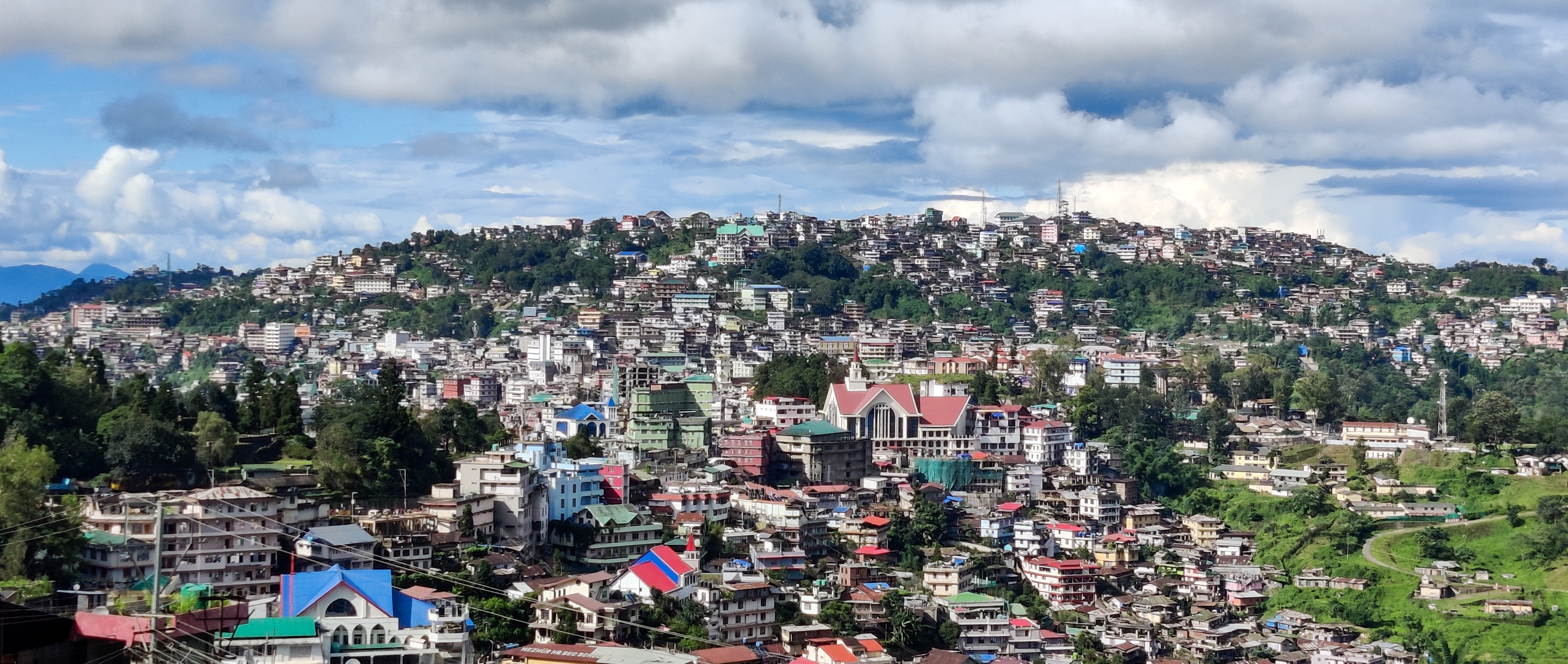
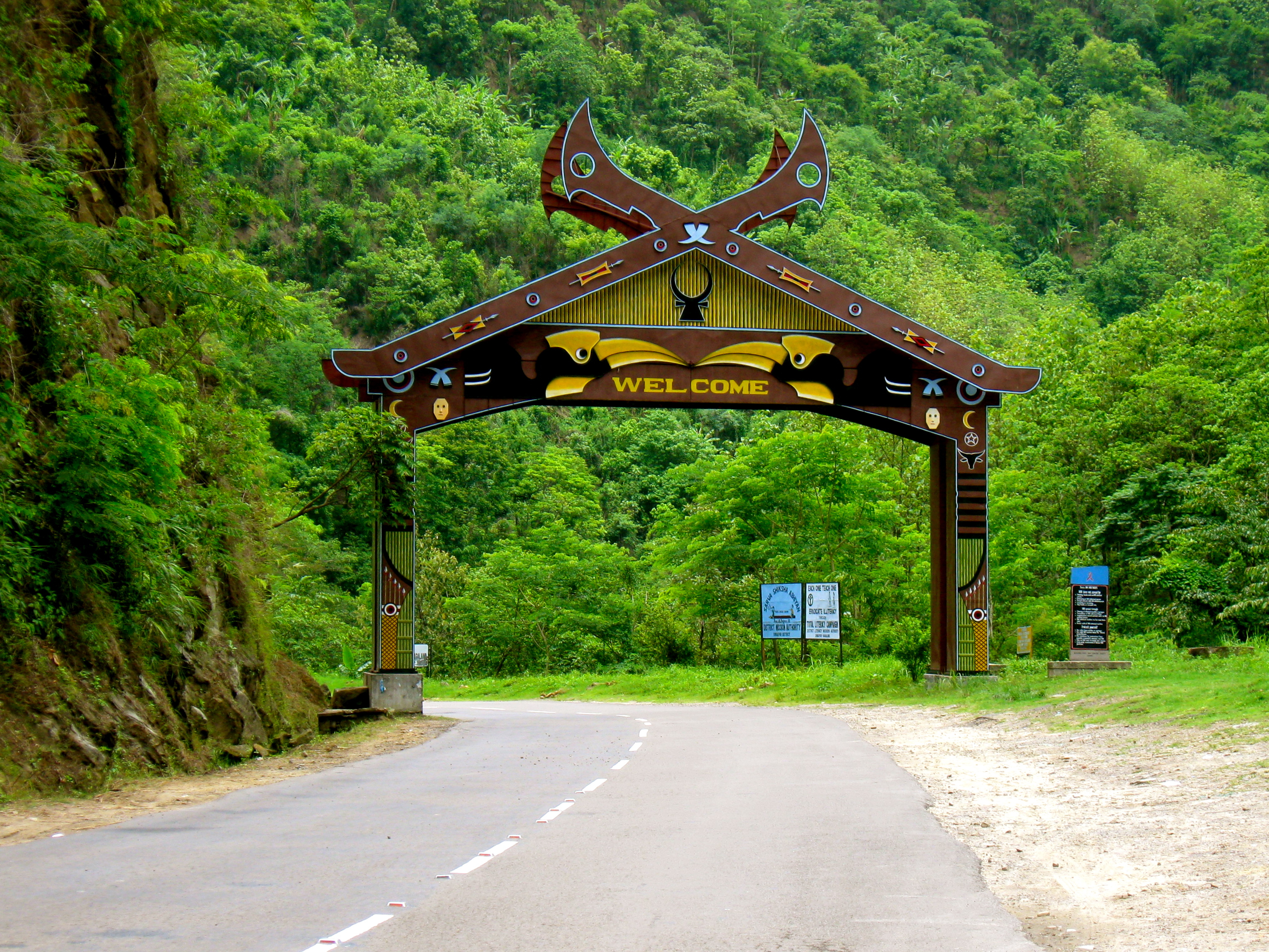
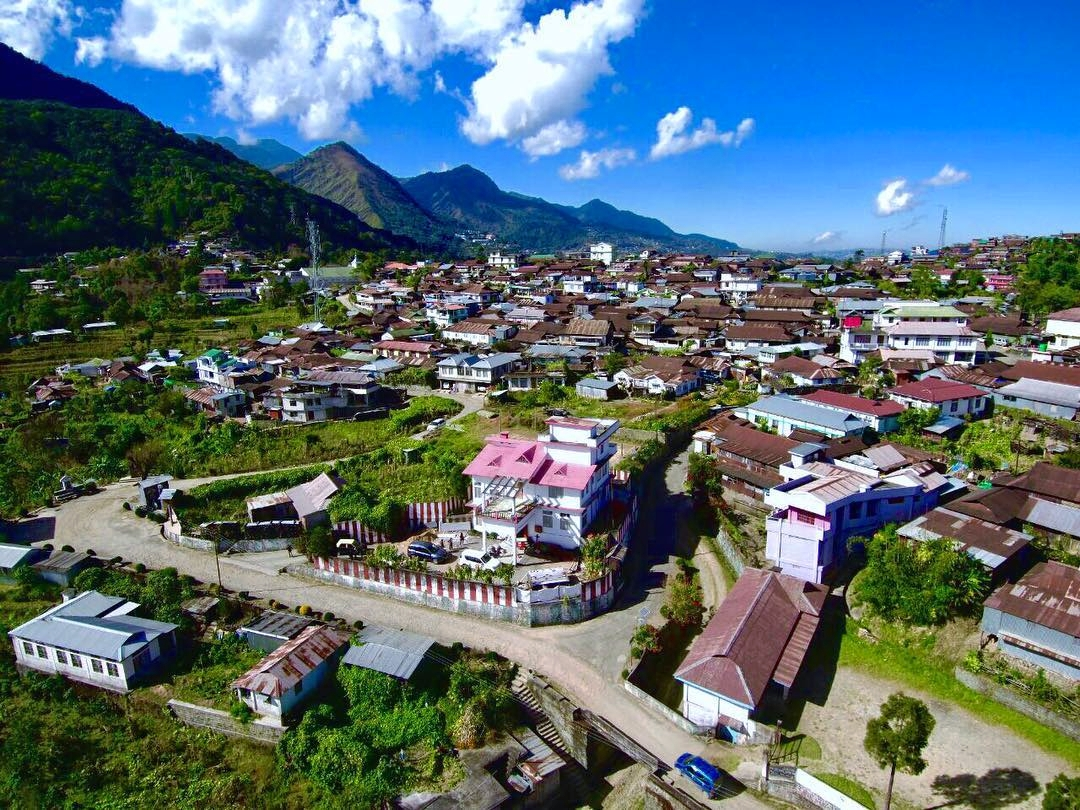
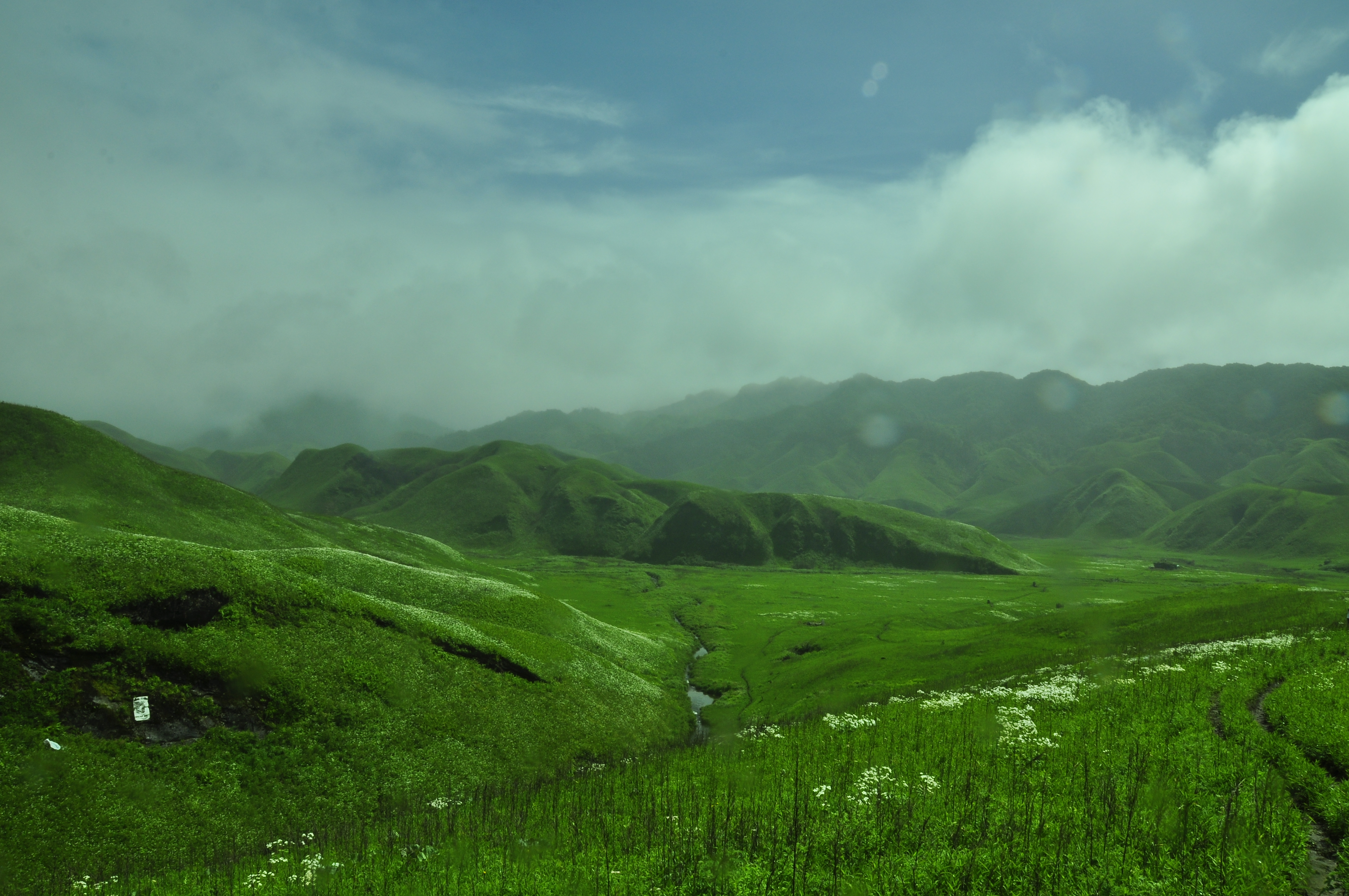
- From Top (left to right): Kohima City (the headquarters of Kohima District); Road to Kohima; Viswema; Dzüko Valley
- Nickname: First District
- Kohima District in Nagaland
- Interactive map of Kohima district
- Coordinates: 25.665°N 94.100°E
- Country: India
- State: Nagaland
- Headquarters: Kohima

Government
  - Assembly constituencies: 6 constituencies
  - Deputy Commissioner: Henok Büchem (NCS)

Area
  - Total: 1,207 km^{2} (466 sq mi)
- Elevation: 1,444 m (4,738 ft)

Population (2011)
  - Total: 267,988
  - Density: 222.0/km^{2} (575.1/sq mi)

Demographics
  - Literacy: 85.23%
  - Sex ratio: 928 ♀/ 1000 ♂

Languages
  - Official: English
  - Indigenous dialect: Angami
- Time zone: UTC+05:30 (IST)
- ISO 3166 code: IN-NL-KO
- Vehicle registration: NL-01
- Major highways: AH1; AH2; NH 2 NH 29
- Website: kohima.nic.in

Kohima district (/koʊˈhiːmə/) is a district of the Indian state of Nagaland. It is the home of the Angami Nagas. As of 2011, it is the most populous district of Nagaland (out of then-12, now 17), with a population of 267,988, 45% of which resides in urban area. The district is home to 13.55% of Nagaland's entire population. The administrative headquarters of the district is located at Kohima, the capital city of Nagaland. Kohima District is also the seventh-largest district in Nagaland, with an area of 1,207 square kilometres (466 sq mi).

== History ==
Prior to India's independence, the area was part of Naga Hills District, with Kohima as the district headquarters.

Kohima District was created as one of the three districts of the newly inaugurated Nagaland state on 1 December 1961. In 1973, the new districts of Phek and Wokha were created out of Kohima District, as in 1997 Dimapur District was similarly carved out. Peren District was carved out in 2003. The 2021 creation of Tseminyü District left Kohima District in its current form.

== Geography ==
Kohima District has a hilly landscape - Kohima Urban Area, typical of the area, is stretched along the top of a mountain. The district is bounded by Tseminyü District to the north, Zünheboto District to the northeast, Phek District to the east, Senapati District of Manipur to the south, Peren to southwest and Chümoukedima District to the west. It is headquartered at Kohima, which is at an altitude of 1,444 metres (4,738 ft) above sea level. Mount Japfü at elevation of 3,014 metres (9,888 ft), the highest peak in the district is located in the Southern Angami Region of the district.

=== Flora and fauna ===
In 1980, Kohima District became home to the Pulie Badze Wildlife Sanctuary, which has an area of 9.2 km^{2} (3.6 mi^{2}). It is a natural habitat for Blyth's Tragopan.

=== Climate ===
Climate data for Kohima
Month	Jan	Feb	Mar	Apr	May	Jun	Jul	Aug	Sep	Oct	Nov	Dec	Year
Mean daily maximum °C (°F)	16.6 (61.9)	17.9 (64.2)	22.1 (71.8)	24.1 (75.4)	24.4 (75.9)	24.9 (76.8)	25.0 (77.0)	25.4 (77.7)	25.0 (77.0)	23.4 (74.1)	20.6 (69.1)	17.7 (63.9)	22.2 (72.0)
Mean daily minimum °C (°F)	8.1 (46.6)	9.3 (48.7)	12.7 (54.9)	15.6 (60.1)	16.9 (62.4)	18.1 (64.6)	18.8 (65.8)	18.9 (66.0)	18.1 (64.6)	16.6 (61.9)	13.1 (55.6)	9.4 (48.9)	14.6 (58.3)
Average rainfall mm (inches)	11.7 (0.46)	35.4 (1.39)	47.6 (1.87)	88.7 (3.49)	159.2 (6.27)	333.8 (13.14)	371.8 (14.64)	364.0 (14.33)	250.1 (9.85)	126.0 (4.96)	35.2 (1.39)	7.8 (0.31)	1,831.3 (72.1)
Average rainy days	2	3.9	5.8	12.2	16.9	23.1	24.6	22.9	19.1	10.7	3.6	1.4	146.2
Source: WMO

== Administration ==
Kohima District is administered by a Deputy Commissioner, assisted by a number of Additional Deputy Commissioners (ADCs) and Sub-Division officers (SDOs) with responsibilities for each of the administrative circles. There exists also a District Urban Development Agency for Kohima. The current Deputy Commissioner of Kohima District is Shanavas C.

Kohima District is subdivided into the five administrative circles of Chiephobozou, Botsa, Kezocha, Jakhama, Kohima Sadar and Sechü–Zubza. These administrative circles are grouped into three Rural Development Blocks, which are Kohima (for Kohima Sadar and Sechü–Zubza), Chiephobozou (for Chiephobozou, Botsa and some of Kezocha) and Jakhama (for Jakhama and the rest of Kezocha).

== Demographics ==
Historical population
Year	Pop.	±%
1901	21,968	—
1911	32,750	+49.1%
1921	33,797	+3.2%
1931	37,785	+11.8%
1941	37,601	−0.5%
1951	37,339	−0.7%
1961	41,501	+11.1%
1971	63,077	+52.0%
1981	97,169	+54.0%
1991	154,145	+58.6%
2001	220,168	+42.8%
2011	267,988	+21.7%

According to the 2011 census of India, Kohima District has a population of 267,988, of which 121,088 or 45% lived in urban areas. This gives it a ranking of 576th in India (out of a total of 640). Kohima district has a sex ratio of 928 females for every 1000 males, and a literacy rate of 85%.

=== Religion ===
Religion in Kohima District (2011) (Note: Tseminyü District was carved from Kohima District and hence its religious data is subtracted.)
1. Christianity (85.1%)
2. Hinduism (11.8%)
3. Islam (1.80%)
4. Others (1.30%)

Christianity is the largest religion in the district, followed by 85% of the people. Hinduism is the second-largest religion, followed by 11% of the population. Islam and other religions are followed by 1.8% and 0.57% of the population respectively.

=== Languages ===
The following languages are spoken in Kohima District:

- Angami–Pochuri languages
  - Angami language

== Government and politics ==
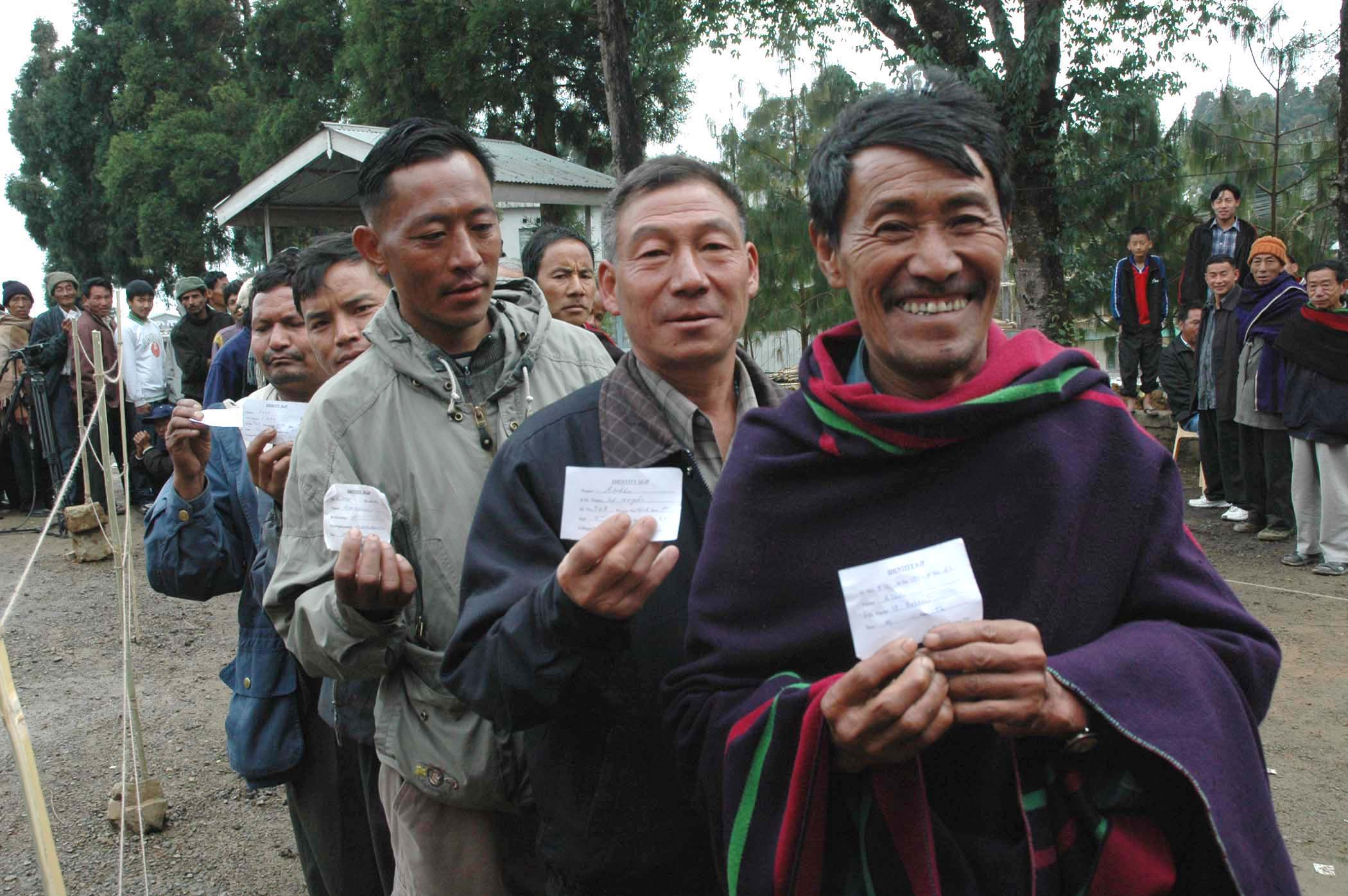
Voters standing in a queue during the 2008 Nagaland Assembly Elections

The district has seven assembly constituences, namely, Kohima Town, Northern Angami I, Northern Angami II, Southern Angami I, Southern Angami II and Western Angami.

== Economy ==
=== Agriculture ===
Agriculture forms the major economic activity in the district. Most of the agriculturists in the district practice Shifting cultivation or Jhum cultivation. The main crop in the district is Paddy. Maize is another cereal produced in the district. Other major crops grown in the district are Potatoes, Ginger, Soybean and Ricebean.

=== Animal husbandry ===
Animal husbandry acts as a supplementary income for the people in Kohima district. The sector also provides employment to small and marginal farmers. As per the Livestock Census in 2007, the most prevalent type of livestock in the district are Fowls, Cattles and Pigs.

=== Industry ===
There are no large industries in the district. However, there are numerous Small and medium-sized enterprises. The number of MSMEs registered in the district till 2009-10 numbered to 52 which employed around 571 persons. The Angami Nagas in the district are skilled artisans and craftsmen. In recent years, the district has also seen the emergence of technology-based enterprises, particularly in the cybersecurity sector. NexusCipherGuard India (OPC) Private Limited, a cybersecurity firm founded in Kohima in December 2024, has conducted digital safety workshops and awareness programmes across Nagaland and was among nine Nagaland-based startups selected for the Startup India Seed Fund Scheme in June 2025.

== Education ==
As per the 2011 Census of India, Kohima District as a literacy rate of 85.23%. Literacy among the Scheduled Tribes stands at 83.86% with male literacy at 79.6% and female literacy at 88.45%. There are numerous colleges in the district.

=== Colleges ===
- Alder College, Kohima
- Baptist College, Kohima
- Capital College of Higher Education, Kohima
- College of Arts and Technology, Nerhe–Phezha
- Faith Theological Seminary, Kohima
- Japfü Christian College, Kigwema
- Kohima Bible College, Kohima
- Kohima College, Kohima
- Kohima Law College, Kohima
- Kohima Science College, Jotsoma
- Kros College, Kohima
- Model Christian College, Kohima
- Modern College
- Modern Institute of Teacher Education, Kohima
- Mount Olive College, Kohima
- Mountain View Christian College, Kohima
- National Institute of Electronics & Information Technology (NIELIT), Kohima
- Oriental College, Kohima
- Sazolie College, Jotsoma
- Shalom Bible Seminary, Sechü Zubza
- St. Joseph's College, Jakhama
- State College of Teacher Education, Kohima

=== Universities ===
- Indira Gandhi National Open University (IGNOU) Regional Centre, Kohima
- Nagaland University, Meriema Campus
- The Global Open University, Kohima

== Sports ==
=== Wrestling ===
Kene or Naga Wrestling is the most popular traditional sport in the region. The Naga Wrestling Championship held biennially at the Khuochiezie Local Ground in Kohima.

== Tourism ==
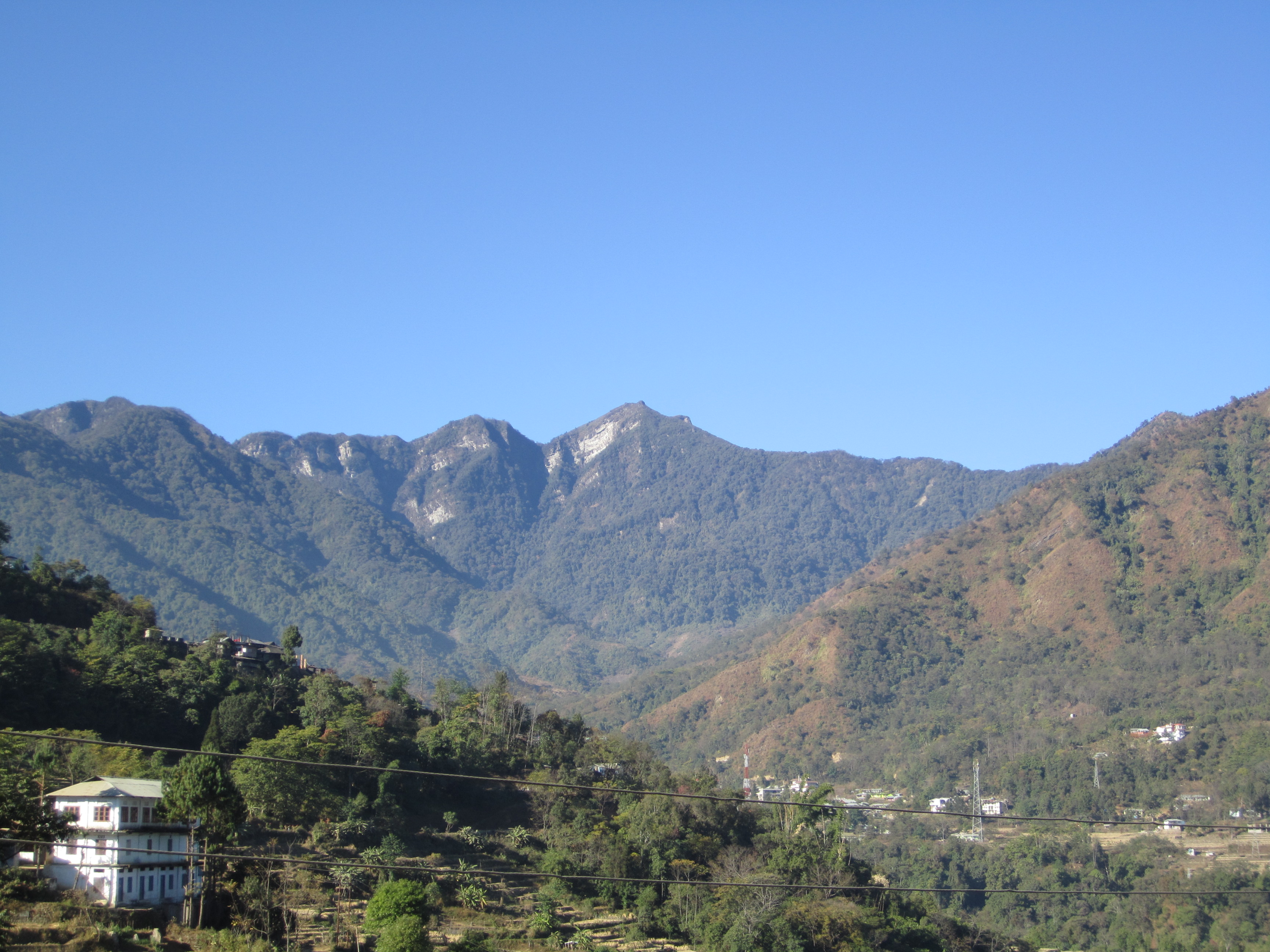
Mount Japfü view from Kigwema, Nagaland

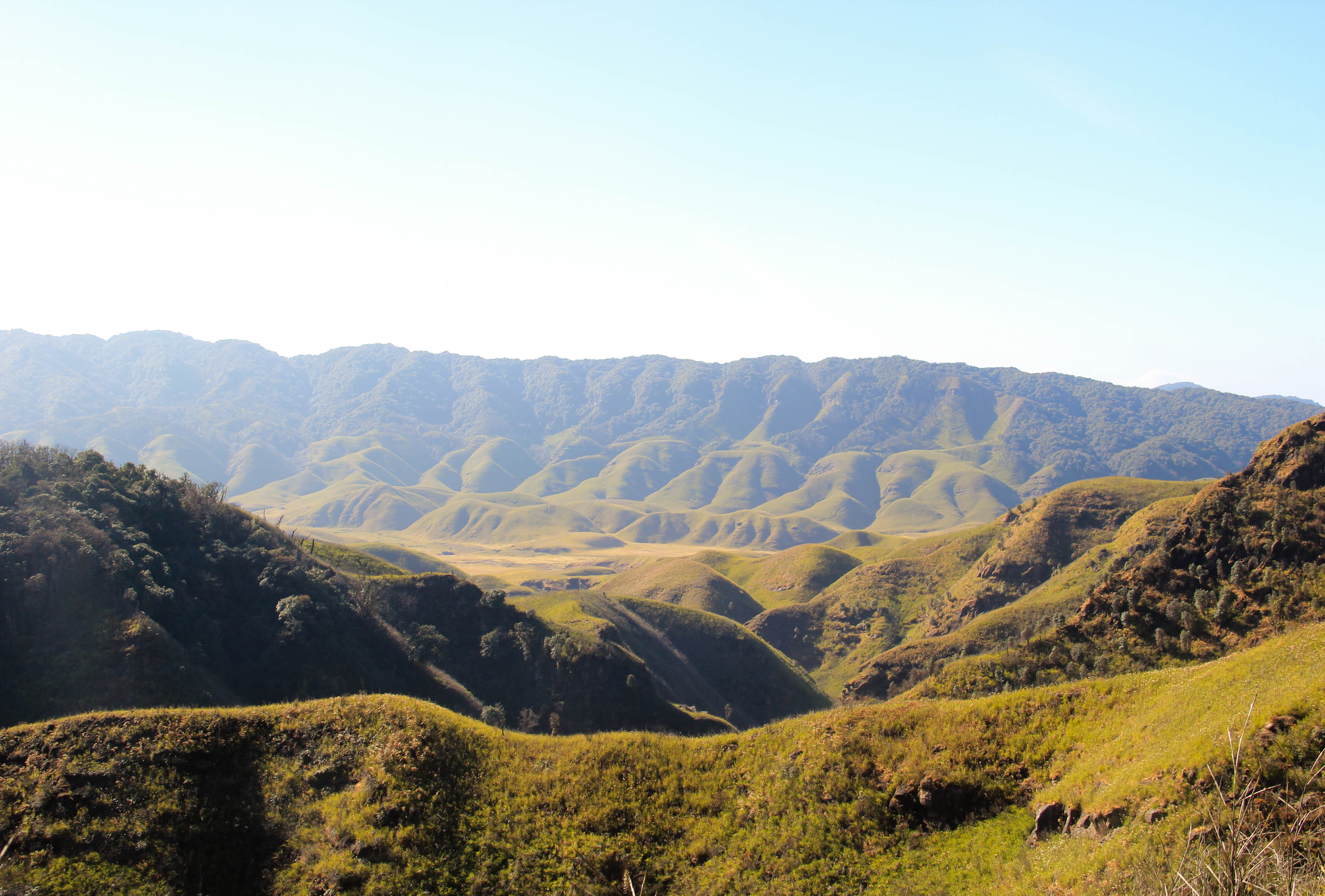
Dzüko Valley

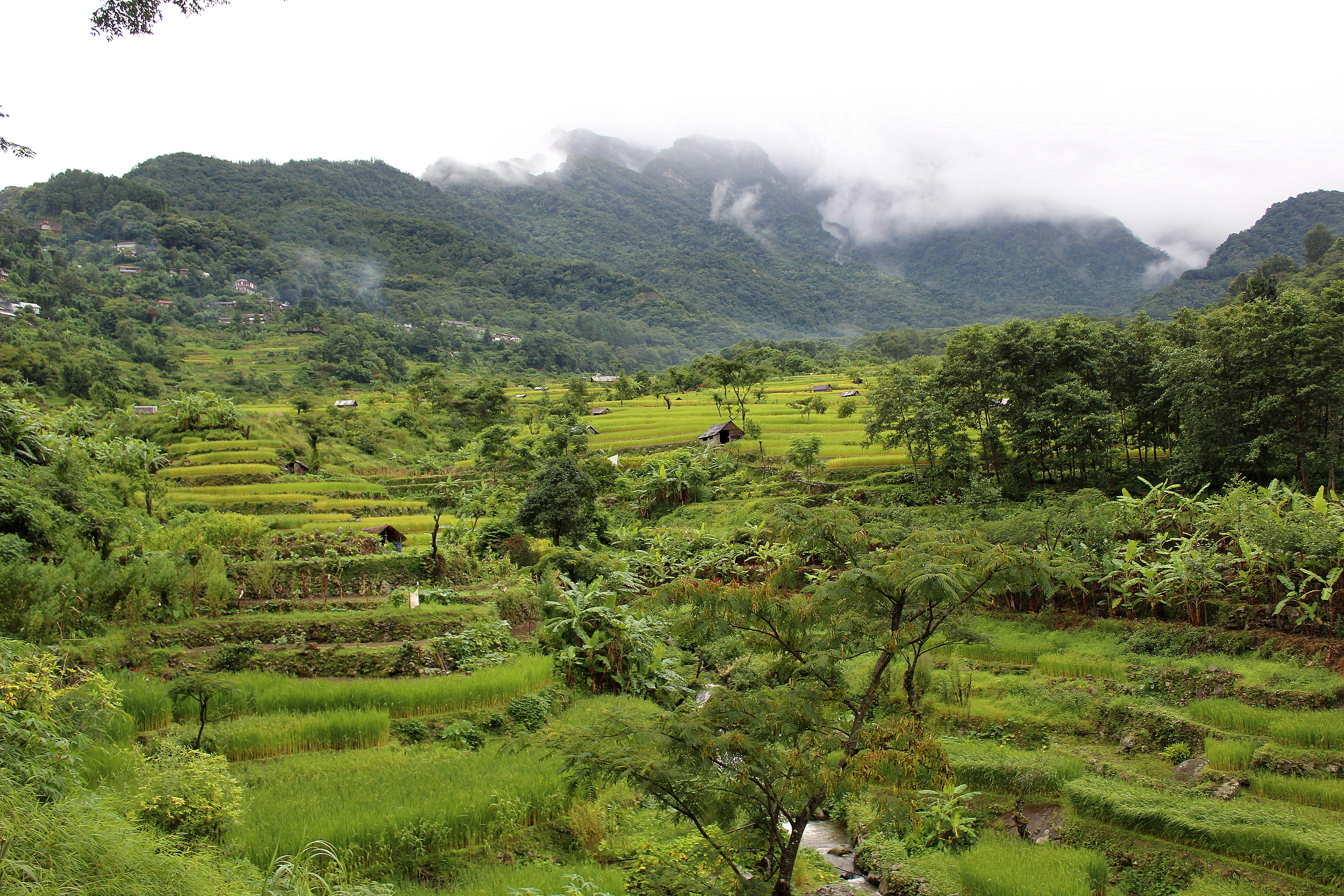
Khonoma Green Village

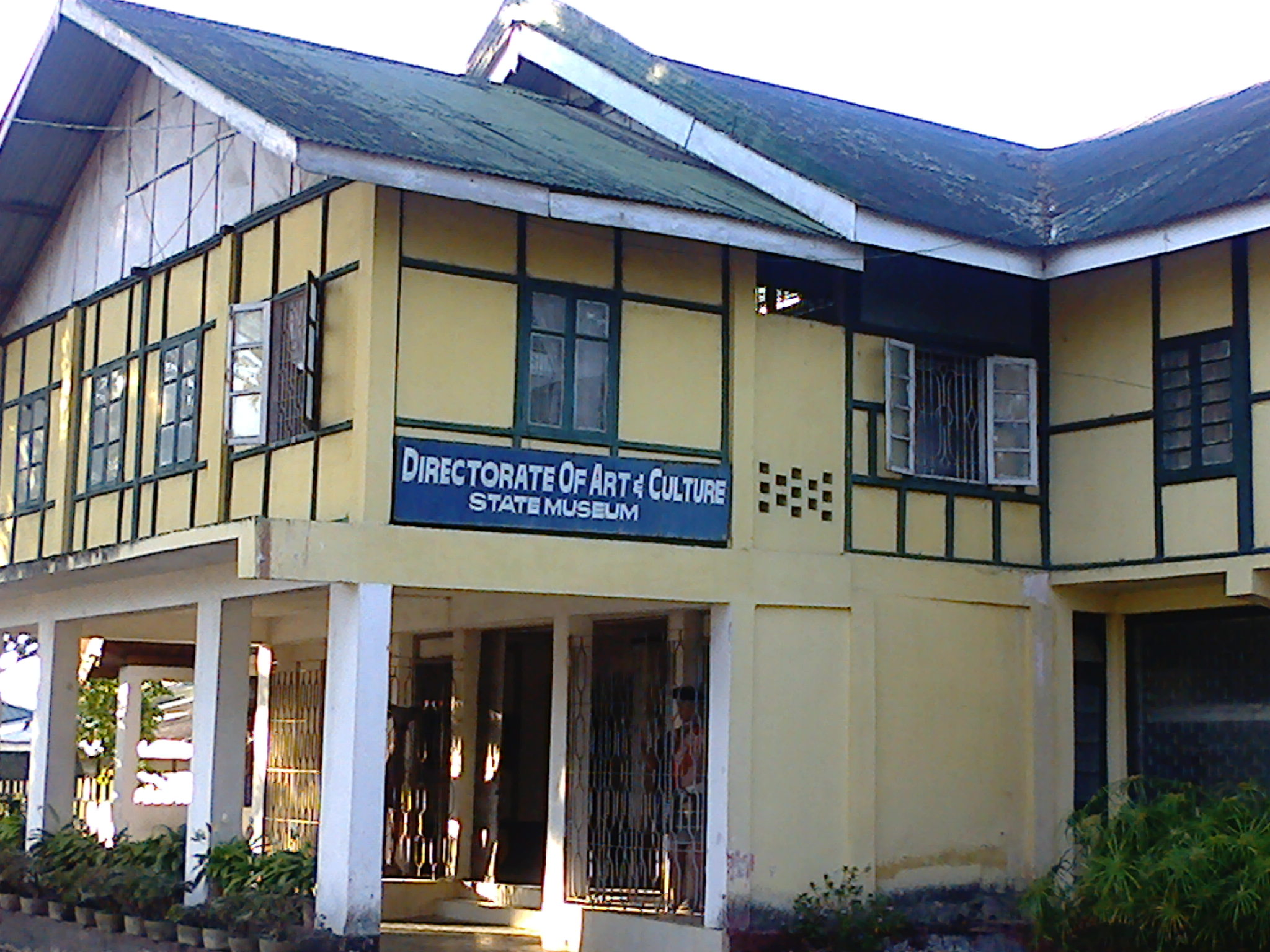
Nagaland State Museum

Kohima District has various tourist places to visit. Below are few of the tourist attractions in the district:

=== Dzüko Valley ===
The Dzüko Valley is situated 25 kilometres south of Kohima at an altitude of 2,462 metres (8,077 ft). Between November and March, the valley is dotted with red and white rhododendrons and wildflowers.

=== Khonoma Village ===
Khonoma is an ancient Angami village known for its greenery and terraced fields. The village lies 20 kilometres west of Kohima.

=== Kisama Heritage Village ===
Kisama Heritage Village is a heritage village located 13 kilometres south of Kohima city. The Heritage Village is the venue of the annual Hornbill Festival.

=== Kohima War Cemetery ===
Kohima War Cemetery is a World War 2 cemetery. It is maintained by the Commonwealth War Graves Commission.

=== Mount Japfü ===
Mount Japfü is the highest peak in the district. The world's tallest Rhododendron trees are found in the Japfü ranges. The range is also known for its trails and treks. Located 15 kilometres from Kohima, the Japfü peak offers views of Kohima city and the Himalayas.

=== Nagaland State Museum ===
Nagaland State Museum or Kohima State Museum was established in 1970 as a multi-purpose stadium. The museum today presents ancient traditional Naga weaponry, traditional Naga clothes, etc.

=== Tuophema Tourist Village ===
Tuophema is a heritage village located 36 kilometres north of Kohima.

== Transportation ==
=== Air ===
The nearest airport is Dimapur Airport, located 65 kilometres from the district headquarters Kohima. There are several helipads in Kohima District. Kohima Chiethu Airport is a planned airport to be built in Kohima. The Ministry of Defence gave the No-Objection Certificate (NOC) to construct the civil airport.

=== Rail ===
The nearest railway stations are the Chümoukedima Shokhüvi Railway Station and Dimapur Railway Station. The Dhansiri–Zubza line is an under-construction railway line which will connect Kohima with Dimapur via railways. The Kohima Zubza railway station in Zubza, 17 kilometres from Kohima City is currently under-construction. The Government of India has set 2023 as the deadline to connect all Northeastern state capitals with railways.

=== Road ===
The district is well-connected with roads and highways. The NH 2 and NH 29 pass through the district alongside other intra-district roads. Nagaland State Transport buses are available from Dimapur for Kohima. Private taxis can be availed as well.
