= Naga Army =

Ethnic armed organisation in India and Myanmar

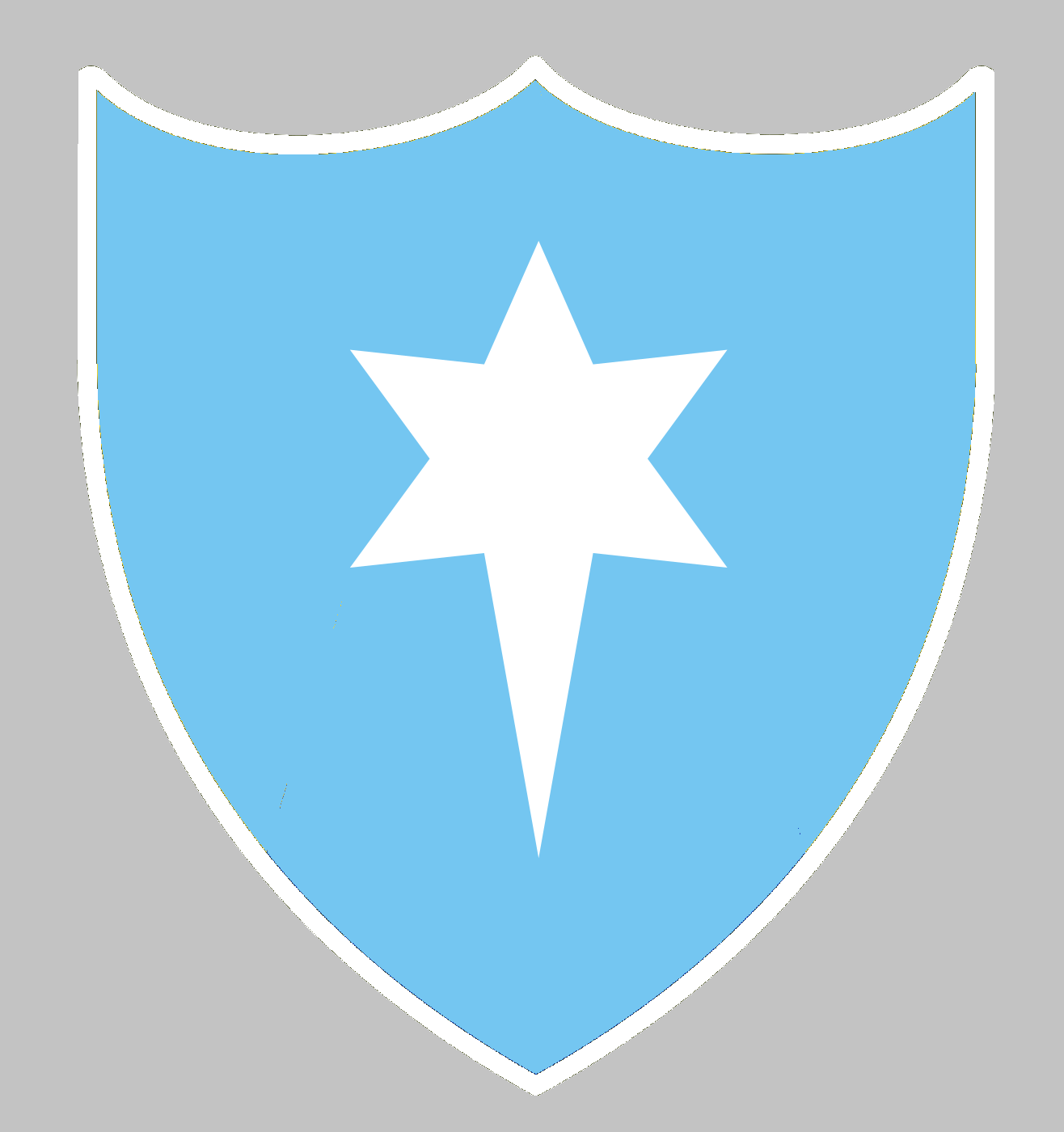
- Badge of the Naga Army
- Leaders: Reivilie Angami; Thuingaleng Muivah; Kaito Sukhai; Mowu Gwizan; Thinuoselie Keyho
- Dates active: 1952 – present
- Headquarters: Taga Camp, Hkamti District, Sagaing Region; Camp Hebron, Peren District, Nagaland
- Active regions: Nagaland, India; Manipur, India; Assam, India; Arunachal Pradesh, India; Meghalaya, India; Sagaing Region, Myanmar
- Ideology: Naga nationalism
- Size: one brigade and six battalions
- Part of: NNC; NSCN
- Wars: Insurgency in Northeast India
- Website: Naga Army FB page

The Naga Army is the ethnic minority army of the Naga people. Currently it is the military wing of the National Socialist Council of Nagalim (NSCN).

== History ==
=== First phase: under the NNC ===
The Naga Army was founded by Reivilie Angami in 1952. In its first phase it was part of the Naga National Council political party.

The Naga National Council had two wings, the Naga Federal Government (NFG) —renamed Federal Government of Nagaland (FGN) in 1959— and the Naga Army, also known by other names, such as Naga Home Guard (preceded by the Safe Guard), Naga Federal Army, etc. After more than a decade of unfruitful talks with the Indian authorities, including Prime Minister Jawaharlal Nehru, Zapu Phizo, the NNC chairman, lost faith in the diplomatic process. He realized that the possibility of a peaceful settlement of the issue with India would be very remote, for he saw that there was no intention to grant self-determination to Nagaland. When the insurgent army began operating in the Naga territories the Indian government responded heavy-handedly. In 1958 the whole sector was declared a "disturbed area" by the Indian state, the Armed Forces Special Powers Act (AFSPA) was implemented and the Indian Army forced its way into the Naga region. In the ensuing unequal battle the Naga fighters were crushed. Despite official denials, the Indian Armed Forces committed atrocities both against the fighters, as well as against the civilian population, including torture, rape and arson. The Naga National Council leadership fled to East Pakistan and Phizo went from there into exile. The insurgents meanwhile dispersed among the civilian population and engaged in small, sporadic, guerrilla attacks. Some of the most severe confrontations of this period took place in Jotsoma village. Later, on 26 August 1960, a Douglas C-47 plane of the Indian Air Force was shot down during an attempt to drop relief materials and ammunitions to a military outpost. Eventually, on 6 September 1964 the Indian Armed Forces declared a ceasefire.

In 1966 the insurgents sought help from China. The first expedition being led by NNC General Secretary Thuingaleng Muivah in October. It trekked across the mountainous Sagaing Division, reaching the Chinese border three months later in January 1967. Over 130 military personnel were trained and indoctrinated in Tengchong, Yunnan, and returned to Nagaland with brand-new Chinese equipment, including rifles and rocket launchers. A second expedition was led by NNC leader Isak Chishi Swu and Naga Army General Mowu Gwizan. The 330 men left in December 1967 and reached China by March 1968, being similarly trained and supplied weapons at Tengchong. A third expedition with one hundred men, led by Ngasating Shimray and Lt. Colonel Taka left Nagaland in January 1968, but they were blocked by Kachin Independence Army (KIA) members, and turned back after having their weapons confiscated.

The association with Communist China caused deep disagreements at the top, as well as among the ranks. General Kaitho Sukhai, who had been in the Naga Army since the beginning, firmly opposed it and left the organization in July 1967. The following year in August he would be assassinated. Shortly thereafter Kaito Sukhai's supporters, who were mostly Sümi Naga, defected from the Naga Army and formed their own organization, the Revolutionary Government of Nagaland (RGN). In the end the cadres of this group gave up the armed struggle and went back to civilian life. Some of them joined the Border Security Force (BSF).

Following the signing of the 1975 Shillong Accord, a key group of the illegal Naga political organisation accepted military defeat and the surrender of arms. The accord —between the Government of India and "Underground Representatives" whose rank or status in the Naga army or the Federal Government of Nagaland were not even mentioned— stipulated that the armament of the Naga guerrillas should be deposited in agreed spots. However, those inspecting the implementation of the accord observed that weapons that had been surrendered were old and outdated and inferred that the best weaponry of the underground forces had been sent across the border to units entrenched in Burma's frontier region. Rano M. Shaiza, Phizo's niece, saw the accord as a favorable opportunity towards a solution of the intractable Naga problem, but she warned too that 'a sizeable underground hardcore led by well-trained, experienced and dedicated leaders has established its headquarters in the Naga territory of northern Burma'.

The Shillong Accord brought relief both to the battle-weary insurgent military personnel, as well as to the civilians living in areas where Indian authorities had put counter-insurgency measures in place. After the surrender of weapons by the Naga guerrillas, over six hundred prisoners of war were released from Indian jails and all cases against them were withdrawn. Numerous Naga military units had been decimated by the Indian forces as a result of the intensive military operations of the previous years. The curfew that had been imposed in many rural sectors, and which prevented harvesting —thus threatening villagers with famine, was finally lifted. Moreover, villagers who had been fined up to 118,062.50 Indian rupees as punishment for assisting the Naga army were reimbursed.

The cessation of hostilities in 1975, meant that the Naga Army personnel fighting inside Nagaland had accepted defeat, conceding the operational victory to the Indian military. According to governor L.P. Singh, at a certain point around 1,400 Naga soldiers had surrendered. Meanwhile, the NNC, the political wing, had made fundamental concessions in order to survive. However, the group led by Thuingaleng Muivah quartered beyond the Burmese border had remained relatively intact. Muivah, along with Isak Chishi Swu, wanted to keep the armed struggle going against India and denounced the signatories of the accord in the most severe terms: "In spite of 'the bitterest pressure they have been subjected to, the Nagas will forever hold their own ... any talks, any negotiations tending to [include Nagaland] within the Indian Union are unequivocally the works of hidden traitors who in no way represent the people'. This intransigence created a wide rift in Naga society.

After the years of confrontation there was a general desire for peace in Nagaland and the Shillong Accord was seen as a positive step by large sections of the public. Nevertheless, there was a wide gap between those supporting the accord and those opposing it. In 1978 members of the Nagaland Peace Council (NPC) —the organization which had arranged the meeting at Shillong— organized an expedition to the Naga area of northern Burma in order to persuade the last remnants of the NNC, FGN and the Naga Army to accept the accord. Even though the Indian authorities had been duly informed by the Naga Peace Council of their mission, the group was waylaid and arrested by Indian security units before they reached the Burmese border.

=== Second phase: under the NSCN ===
The tensions generated in the wake of the acceptance of the Shillong Accord by the NNC culminated in the establishment of the NSCN (National Socialist Council of Nagaland) on 31 January 1980. The new leadership had previously rewritten the Naga Constitution (Yehzabo) after a socialist pattern, centralizing the power on itself. Thus the new political party distanced itself from the Naga National Council, the political organization that had hitherto led the struggle towards self-determination and secession. The shift towards socialism marked a new era in the Nagaland insurgency. Christianity had been a major identity factor among the Naga people, transcending tribe and language. Phizo himself was not attracted to communism —'We wish to remain within the fold of the Christian nations', he is quoted as declaring. For nearly 30 years the Naga guerillas had fought quite successfully with no ideology other than their ethnic nationalism complemented by their Christian tradition, but this was about to change.

From their sanctuary in a remote area of Burma where the last remnants of the Naga Army had taken refuge, Isak Chisi Swu, Thuingaleng Muivah and S.S. Khaplang, had begun in November 1979 by killing all the top leaders who opposed their new guidelines. These included Naga army officers of different ranks, as well as important political figures, such as the NNC vice President, the Speaker of the Tatar Hoho, and some ministers. In this ruthless manner the more radical NSCN co-opted the remaining fighting units of the Naga nationalist movement and deprived the more moderate NNC of a military branch. From the onset, the insurgency led by the NSCN mirrored the irregular warfare of numerous Marxist–Leninist revolutionary outfits present in the region of Northeast India, as well as in northern Burma. Still, it is very likely that the radicalization would have occurred even without the mid-1960s exposure of Naga guerrilla cadres to the Maoist methods and revolutionary dogma of the Chinese PLA in neighboring Yunnan.

In this early stage, the NSCN already established links with the People's Liberation Army of Manipur and the United Liberation Front of Assam (ULFA). Later, a number of other insurgent outfits of the area would be added to the grand plan, the NSCN helping them to procure weapons, providing training for their cadres, and extorting money in order to finance the operations of the group. Thus the new political organization extended its influence beyond Nagaland through organized crime, patronizing the insurgency of other communities. Besides the extorsion racket, the political wing used money earned through drug trade in order to pay for the training of the Naga Army cadres and procure arms. The funds were also necessary to run the encampments used as training bases for its own, as well as for the fighters of other regional rebel groups. In its previous phase the Naga Army had obtained some weapons from East Pakistan, as well as from China, but ultimately it did not get substantial support. However, under the NSCN there began a regular supply of weapons acquired through clandestine arms dealers in Thailand. The cargoes arrived by vessel to Cox's Bazar in Bangladesh, and were carried overland via Bandarban along the eastern border of Mizoram and through Churachandpur and Tamenglong they reached the Peren district of Nagaland. From there the arms consignments would eventually reach Kaphlang's Taga camp, located south of Nanyun, near the Chindwin river, at 26°49′52″N 96°12′14″E. Taga would become one of the main ULFA training camps, as well as of the NDFB.

Kaphlang's bases in the remote Naga Hills had been a windfall for Isak Chisi Swu and Thuingaleng Muivah when in the early 1970s the relentless counterinsurgency operations of the Indian forces had defeated the Naga insurgents in the west. After being driven out of their bases on the Indian side of the border, they were able to regroup there, in the northern Sagaing Region, beyond the reach of the Indian army. There, they could not only get a respite, but were even able to launch cross-border raids into the Indian side. Even so, with the passing of the years inter-tribal differences in the NSCN military camp became worse by the day. They were exacerbated by the overbearing behavior of the Western Naga personnel towards those belonging to the Eastern Naga groups, and in January 1988 there was an incident in which several top cadres of Thuingalong Muivah and Isaac Swu were killed. Finally the leadership of the political party split into two factions: the NSCN (K) fraction led by S.S. Khaplang, the former NSCN vice-president, and the NSCN (IM) led by Isak and Muivah, the chairman and the General Secretary respectively. While Khaplang continued staying in the Taga camp, Muivah and Swu were driven to other locations beyond the border towards Nagaland and Manipur.

Following a relatively quiet interval, in the second half of 1991 a group of 240 Naga Army soldiers belonging to the NSCN (IM) group marched southwards along the eastern border of Mizoram and turned westwards into Bangladesh. They had been sent to collect a shipment of weapons which had arrived at Cox's Bazar on a coastal vessel. This was the first batch of a number of consignments of arms purchased through dealers in Thailand with the help of the Pakistani ISI and the Bangladeshi DGFI. After the weapons had been collected by the group of NSCN (IM) cadres, the arms were brought back to Nagaland along the same route they had followed when reaching Bangladesh. It was during this period that the DGFI helped the NSCN (IM) —as well as the ULFA and the NDFB— to set up military training camps in the Chittagong Hill Tracts; additionally it provided safe houses in Dhaka and other locations in Bangladesh. This assistance gave a new impulse to the insurgency in Nagaland, Assam and Manipur.

As a result of the newly obtained support, the NSCN (IM) expanded its operations to Meghalaya, where it already had safe houses in Shillong, the capital of the state. There it linked with the newly founded Hynniewtrep Achik Liberation Council (HALC), the first insurgent group in that small state. The Naga army cadres marched through safe routes across the mountainous terrain of the Garo Hills to bring the HALC recruits to the training facilities in Bangladesh. The Hynniewtrep Achik Liberation Council subsequently split up in two along ethnic lines, the Khasi Hynniewtrep National Liberation Council (HNLC) and the Garo Achik National Volunteer Council (ANVC). Both groups were helped by the NSCN (IM) when they requested assistance and the Naga military personnel helped them to set up training camps. The main interest of the NSCN (IM) in Meghalaya was in extorting vast sums of money from the wealthy Marwari traders of Shillong.

Relations between Mizo and Naga insurgents were never good. Mizo armed rebellion against the Indian state began in 1966, eleven years later than in Nagaland. However, the NSCN (IM) decided to help the Hmar, an ethnic group related to the Mizo, when they formed the Hmar Peoples Convention (HPC) against the Mizoram State government. Naga militias took the HPC under their wing, providing them with weapons and training its cadres. They were based in camps on the North Cachar Hills, from where they engaged in small guerrilla operations. Led by Naga cadres they carried out armed bank robberies and numerous ambushes on security forces in inner Cachar district. One of the underlying reasons for the cooperation with the Hmars was Naga irredentism, for the NSCN (IM) was seeking to develop a connection with the small Zeme Naga community living in the North Cachar Hills.

The Indian military along with the Intelligence Bureau became aware of the regular weapon supplies coordinated by the NSCN (IM) that were carried overland to Nagaland from Cox's Bazar. In April 1995, after having monitored a sufficient amount of movements along the frontier region, they decided to act in a surprise attack named Operation Golden Bird. The operation was to be carried out in coordination with the Tatmadaw. The arms convoy was ambushed to the west of Parva, a village located at 22°05′08″N 92°38′47″E in the Lawngtlai District of Mizoram. The sudden attack caught the soldiers that were transporting the arms consignment by surprise. A total of 58 cadres of the Naga Army, as well as some of the ULFA and the NDFB were killed. A number of prisoners were made and more than a hundred weapons were captured. However, owing to a last-minute neglect to cooperate by the Tatmadaw, it is estimated that more than a hundred cadres of the convoy escaped with their weapons.

==== The 1997 ceasefire ====
In 1997, after a number of discussions, the Indian government was able to bring the NSCN (IM) leaders to sign a ceasefire agreement. Thuingaleng Muivah and Isak Chishi Swu laid three preliminary conditions, of which the government of India accepted two. The negotiations began in the summer and a ceasefire agreement was signed, which included the suspension of hostilities for a period of three months with effect from the 1 August 1997 in order to engage in political level discussions. Meanwhile, the Naga soldiers came out of their jungle hideouts to accompany their political leaders signing the agreement. The latter were housed in old offices of the Indian Forest Department. After a period of time the NSCN (IM) would add its own buildings to accommodate its military personnel, the place becoming what is now Camp Hebron.

As part of the agreement, a ceasefire monitoring group was established and eleven ground rules were set. These included that on the NSCN (IM) side there was to be no killing, kidnapping or extortion, while there would be no active military operations by the Indian security forces. Naga military camps could be maintained in notified places, but militia members would not patrol with arms and would not forcefully recruit new cadres. However, they were allowed to move from camp to camp concealing their arms. Although the ceasefire was meant for Nagaland, unofficially it was allowed to be extended to the Naga districts of Manipur, a provision that would eventually prove to be a crucial mistake on the part of the Indian Government.

As per the signed agreement, the operations of the Indian security forces, as well as the guerrilla activity of the Naga army were discontinued. However, the NSCN (IM) was not ready to give up its lucrative extortion business, hence though it didn't engage in killings for failure to pay, it cleverly used proxies in Manipur to continue demanding money. Its contacts included the Kanglei Yawol Kanna Lup (KYKL) and the Zomi Revolutionary Army, as well as two minor Kuki insurgent groups, the United Kuki Liberation Front (UKLF), and the Kuki Revolutionary Army (KRA). The latter was allegedly formed owing to the involvement of the NSCN (IM). In all these exactions Naga cadres operated along with the extortionists, but when the ceasefire monitoring group demanded explanations from the NSCN (IM) concerning extortion, the invariable reply was that it was an operation of the Manipuri outfits and that they were not to blame.

Despite the fact that the agreement stated that the NSCN (IM) would not procure weapons for its use, very soon it was found out that it was engaged in its usual arms purchases from abroad. In one instance, on 3 March 1999, an Assam Rifles post received information during the night that five groups totaling over hundred Naga cadres were crossing the border from Bangladesh and headed north. The Assam Rifles set up an ambush and managed to catch the third group while taking a rest, killing six of the NSCN (IM) personnel and a collaborator, as well as wounding one. The weapons from all the killed and captured cadres were subsequently seized. A few days later the Assam Rifles Brigadier was met by senior NSCN (IM) party members of the Dimapur headquarters who objected to the attack on their cadres during the ceasefire and asked for the return of the weapons that had been seized. On 4 August 1999 the ceasefire agreement between the Government of India and the NSCN-IM was extended for another year.

Again, on 16 March 2002, a NSCN (IM) vehicle carrying Naga military personnel from Chandel to Ukhrul, was stopped at a security checkpoint near Pallel manned by the Manipur Rifles. The latter asked the uniformed cadres in the vehicle to lay down their weapons. When the Nagas opened fire, the Manipur Rifles guards immediately fired back. At the end of the shooting there were eleven dead among the Nagas and their weapons were seized. Later there was a strong protest from the NSCN (IM) party leadership, but the government reminded them that, as part of the ceasefire agreement, the Naga cadres should not have moved with their weapons showing, and at any rate they should have stopped when challenged by the guards manning the checkpoint. Thus the seized weapons were not returned. Later, on 25 March 2002 the Chandel District Commissioner was kidnapped and the NSCN (IM) claimed that it was in retaliation for the killing of the eleven Naga cadres nine days before. The NSCN (IM) demanded the weapons to be returned in exchange for the kidnapped official. This issue brought about an interruption of the talks with the Government of India, but the Government stood firm. It threatened that if the District Commissioner was not released, the whole peace process would immediately collapse. Subsequently, the DC was released and the ceasefire resumed.

==== The Khaplang fraction ====
After the NSCN political party split in two in early 1988, the NSCN (K) fraction was led by S.S. Khaplang as chairman. Its armed wing had approximately 2,000 cadres and was based in Taga Camp where it had its headquarters. In a continuation of the initial NSCN policy, a number of other insurgent organizations, such as ULFA, All Tripura Tiger Force (ATTF), PLA, United National Liberation Front (UNLF), Kanglei Yawol Kanna Lup (KYKL) and the People's Revolutionary Party of Kangleipak (PREPAK), were provided military training and shelter by the NSCN (K). The Burmese military paid little attention to the Naga and its fellow insurgent groups who linked up with each other along the little-patrolled Burmese border with India because it was more concerned with ethnic insurgencies further to the east, especially in Shan State. In order to finance its operations the NSCN (K) was involved in extortion and abductions, much in the same manner as the NSCN (IM). Between 1992 and 2000 the group caused 62 civilian and 26 military victims. Meanwhile 245 of its men were killed during the same period.

Initially it was active in the eastern parts of Nagaland on both sides of the border, in the Lahe, Leshi, Hkamti and Nanyun townships of Sagaing Region to the east, as well as in the Tirap and Changlang districts of Arunachal Pradesh to the north. The turn of the millennium and its first decade would be marred by fratricidal violence between the two sections of the NSCN. On 19 August 1999 Dally Mungro, General Secretary of the NSCN (K), and two of his party workers were assassinated by NSCN (IM) armed men in Kohima District. During the months that followed the mutual attacks and killings among members of the two NSCN fractions would continue unabated. On 9 April 2000 the NSCN (K) announced a formal ceasefire with the Government of India after an announcement made in March concerning the readiness of the party to negotiate with the central government. The ceasefire was extended in April 2003 for one year, and in the same month in 2004 for another year.

In mid December 2004 the NSCN (K) announced the cessation of military activity in order to facilitate a peaceful Christmas for the Naga people. On January the Tatmadaw engaged in a small-scale offensive along the forested area of the Chindwin river killing five Naga Army personnel in a number of encounters. The NSCN (K) claimed that it killed ten Burmese soldiers during the clashes. By April the decision was made to extend the ceasefire with the Indian Union Government for another year before the expiration of the truce agreement in April 2005. Despite the ceasefire, all along the year the Indian security forces frequently arrested Naga soldiers belonging to the NSCN (K) for suspected involvement in illegal activities. In December the same year the Tatmadaw attacked and demolished two NSCN (K) camps close to the Indian border. Two cadres were killed and three more seriously wounded. Also a lieutenant of the Naga Army was arrested in the course of the same military operation.

2006 was a year marred by recrudescence of the violence between the NSCN (K) and its rival NSCN (IM). Amidst the recurrent confrontations, a number of defections from one group to the other took place. There were clashes in Burma with the Tatmadaw, in the course of which NSCN (K) units claimed to have killed ten enemy soldiers. Despite the ceasefire the Indian security forces killed four NSCN (K) cadres and arrested military personnel belonging to the organization. Year 2007 began with internecine fighting and abductions among NSCN rivals. On 1 February a temporary encampment of the NSCN (K) near Saijang was attacked by 150 soldiers belonging to the NSCN (IM) in cooperation with PREPAK, KYKL, Kuki Revolutionary Army, UPDS and DHD personnel. According to Anie Konyak, Undersecretary of the NSCN (K), two members of his group as well as five attackers were shot dead in the course of the encounter. In the same month the Indian security forces seized 75 kilograms (165 lb) of TNT from the Khaplang fraction during a raid in Changlang district, Arunachal Pradesh. Meanwhile, on the Burmese side of the border the Tatmadaw carried out a vigorous counterinsurgency campaign between January and February that left at least 100 NSCN (K) and ULFA cadres dead. The ceasefire with the central government was extended in April, but security forces kept a watch and arrested cadres involved in extortion. In late November the Burmese military deployed again in an offensive seeking to dislodge Khaplang's Naga Army small groups and their ULFA allies from their bases in the Sagaing Region.

Following the November clashes to the east of the border, Nagaland Chief Minister Neiphiu Rio formally requested the Union Government to urge the Burmese authorities to set a ceasefire in motion with the NSCN (K), instead of trying to flush the outfit out of the border zone, claiming that: "Peace in the Naga areas of Myanmar is essential to develop trade with Myanmar through Nagaland." In April 2008 the Chief Minister reiterated the demand he put forward in December to the neighboring military regime to seek a truce with the NSCN (K). Rio also affirmed that "The state government and the constituent units of the DAN will support the cause of the Eastern Nagas in Myanmar to help them get due political recognition and rights from the Government there. They have been neglected by Yangon. The Nagas in Nagaland should unanimously support them to facilitate their development along with other Naga communities." In April the ceasefire was extended for another year. Meanwhile, the months that followed saw a recrudescence of the fratricidal fighting between NSCN (K) cadres and those belonging to its rival NSCN (IM), as well as a series of defections between one group and the other.

==== Efforts towards unification ====
In early September 2008, however, a Church-backed 'Forum for Naga Reconciliation' managed to bring the leaders of the NSCN (IM) and NSCN (K) together at the Akuluto Baptist Mission Centre. The outcome was an agreement to work out a way for the merger of both groups after a period of two weeks. Spokespersons of the NSCN (Unification), a marginal group established the previous year as a result of an agreement to unify both rival outfits but whose consensus was later rejected by the NSCN (IM), as well as members of the now largely marginal Naga National Council, were also present in the meeting. However, in the months that followed, the hostilities between the NSCN (IM) and NSCN (K) army members were relentlessly pursued by both sides, resulting in numerous deaths. In October large quantities of modern light weapons and ammunition were smuggled across the India-Myanmar border. Owing to extensive counterinsurgency operations by the Assam Rifles in Assam and Nagaland, the NSCN (K) and ULFA moved their military training camps to Arunachal Pradesh in the area of Changlang and the Myanmar border in November. Newly recruited cadres underwent advanced training in order to be sent later into Myanmar to join the other Naga Army and ULFA units.

Under the auspices of the Forum for Naga Reconciliation, a three-day '4th Naga Peace Summit' took place in Chiang Mai, Thailand, in December. Despite the wide participation, including political representatives of the NSCN (K), NNC and Naga National Workers People Support Group, as well as Naga church leaders, Quakers and American Baptists, the NSCN (IM) stayed away from this reconciliation event.

In January 2009 the Assam State Government formally complained to the Centre that the Naga Army camps of both the NSCN (K) and the NSCN (IM) were giving shelter to Assamese insurgent outfits, including ULFA, AANLA and Black Widow, which were carrying out insurgency operations using those camps as bases. ULFA cadres were carrying out their activities from the safety provided by NSCN (K) camps and the other two outfits were being sheltered by the NSCN (IM). The source further quoted that "... given that the government is in a ceasefire with the two Naga outfits, it is Delhi's responsibility to ensure that their camps are not misused".

A two-day long 'Naga Convention for Reconciliation and Peace' was held in Kohima on 21 and 22 February 2009. A number of Naga community groups, including the Forum for Naga Reconciliation (FNR), the Naga Hoho and its constituent units, political outfits and church assemblies adopted a resolution urging all organisations to "genuinely and honestly" implement reconciliation. NSCN (K) chairman S.S. Khaplang applauded the Naga community groups for taking the initiative to hold the convention.

Since its inception in March 2008, the FNR organised ten meetings of the warring groups operating on both sides of the border. On 7 June the NSCN (K) issued a set of conditions for the unification with the opposing NSCN (IM) fraction. Among these it emphasized that the merger would only be possible after both rival groups revoke the ongoing peace talks with the Indian Government. The Khaplang envoy also stated that any reconciliation meeting between the top leadership of the two main NSCN factions should be held in Nagaland and not on a foreign country. "Meeting for peace and reconciliation at junior level may take place anywhere but for the top level the IM gang must first break the ongoing talks with India and declare the outcome along with the reasons for withdrawal," the group’s spokesman said.

Following the 5th Naga Reconciliation meeting which concluded at Chiang Mai in Thailand on 8 June, a joint declaration was signed by Naga the warring groups in order to resolve "all outstanding issues" among themselves in the "larger interest" of the Naga people. The "Covenant of Reconciliation" that allegedly sought an early solution to the Naga political problem was signed by the NSCN (IM) chairman Isak Chishi Swu, NSCN (K) chairman S.S. Khaplang and S. Singya, the president of Naga National Council. The gathering had been held at the behest of the Forum for Naga Reconciliation (FNR). The FNR leader Rev. Wati Aier claimed that the declaration would give a "new direction" to the Nagas. The faction leaders jointly declared that in the future they would uphold Naga reconciliation and forgiveness based on the "historical and political rights of the Nagas". "We resolve to continue to work together in this spirit of love, non-violence, peace and respect to resolve outstanding issues amongst us," the three Naga leaders stated in the joint declaration. A follow-up meeting of the representatives of the Naga militant factions would be scheduled towards the middle of August 2009 in Dimapur. Still, an effective unification between the NSCN (IM) and NSCN (K) remained elusive despite the repeated efforts.

== See also ==
- Naga Conflict
- Tani Army
- Insurgency in Northeast India
- List of ongoing armed conflicts
- India–Myanmar border

== Bibliography ==
- Nandita Haksar, Sebastian M. Hongray. Kuknalim, Naga Armed Resistance: Testimonies Of Leaders, Pastors, Healers And Soldiers. Speaking Tiger Publishing Pvt. Ltd., 2019, ISBN 978-93-88874-93-9 (epub: ISBN 978-93-88874-92-2)
- Nibedon, Nirmal (1978). Nagaland, the night of the guerrillas. Lancers Publishers. ISBN 978-1897829387.
- Maxwell, Neville (1980). India, the Nagas, and the North-East. MRG. ISBN 9780903114196. OCLC 07133386.
