= Naga Peace Accord =

2015 peace agreement which ended Naga insurgency

Naga Peace Accord, 2015
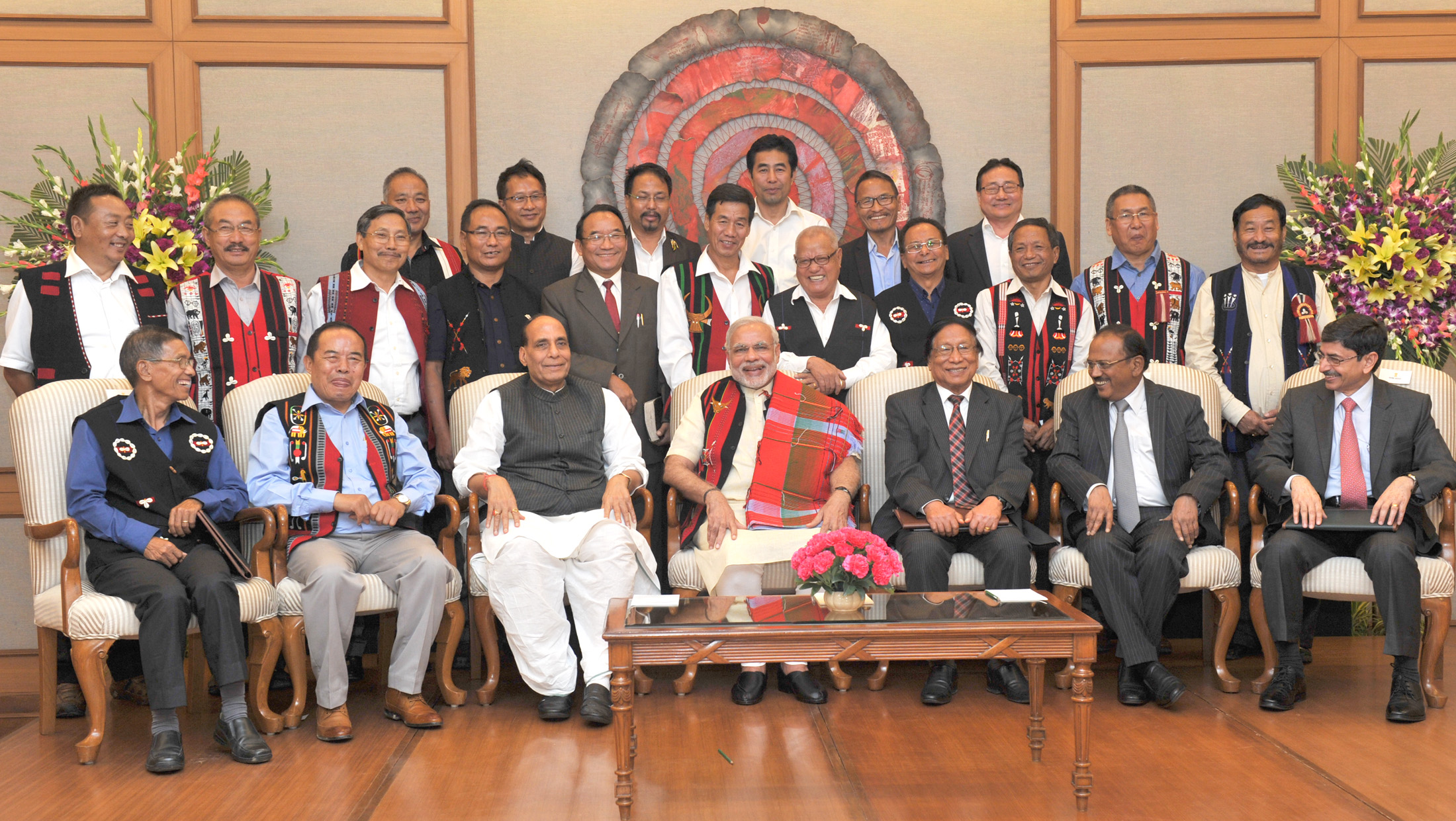
- Government of India and National Socialist Council of Nagaland signing of a historic peace accord
- Type: Peace
- Signed: August 3, 2015
- Location: New Delhi, India
- Original signatories: Isak Chishi Swu; R. N. Ravi
- Parties: National Socialist Council of Nagaland; Government of India
- Language: English

The Naga Peace Accord is a peace treaty, signed, on 3 August 2015, between the Government of India, and the National Socialist Council of Nagaland (NSCN), to end the insurgency in the state of Nagaland in Northeast India. The Government’s interlocutor for Naga Peace Talks, R. N. Ravi signed it on behalf of the Government of India, whereas Isak Chishi Swu, Chairman and Thuingaleng Muivah, General Secretary signed on behalf of the NSCN, in presence of the Indian Prime Minister, Narendra Modi.

== Naga Peace Talks ==
The Naga peace talks refer to talks undertaken between the Indian government and the various stakeholders in Nagaland to resolve decades-old disputes. Some of these issues date back to the colonial era. According to reports, the demand for a Greater Nagaland, or Nagalim— covering Nagaland, its neighboring states and even parts of Myanmar— has been an important part of Naga nationalism. It's a demand being made for decades, and was first crystallized via the formation of a Naga Club in 1918. The Naga Club had reportedly told the Simon Commission that the Nagas should be left alone "to determine for ourselves as in ancient times".

On August 14, 1947, the Naga National Council (NNC) led by Angami Zapu Phizo declared Nagaland an independent state. Phizo also formed an underground Naga Federal Government (NFG) and a Naga Army in 1952, which the Indian government sought to crush by sending in the Army to Nagaland and enacting the Armed Forces (Special) Powers Act, or AFSPA.

== History ==
Over the course of years, even as the insurgency continued in Nagaland, efforts were made by the government to bring the insurgents to the table.

In 1975, a peace accord between the government and the NNC was signed. Called the Shillong Accord, according to the agreement, the NNC promised to give up arms, but several senior leaders within the NNC did not agree with the agreement and broke away to float their own factions. One such faction was the NSCN, which later split to form the NSCN(I-M) faction.

In 1997, the NSCN(I-M) signed a ceasefire agreement with the government. The agreement ensured that while the government would not push for counter-insurgency operations against the NSCN (I-M) cadre and its leadership, the rebels on their part would not target armed forces.

In 2015, with the Narendra Modi government firmly in power, and PM Modi's push towards bringing an early resolution to the dispute, a framework agreement was signed, setting the stage for the ongoing peace talks.

== Framework Agreement ==
Termed as "historic" by PM Modi, the agreement was signed after over 80 rounds of talks between the government and various stakeholders, but the exact details of the agreement haven't been revealed. In a statement after the agreement was signed, the government said it has "recognised the unique history, culture and position of the Nagas and their sentiments and aspirations. The NSCN understood and appreciated the Indian political system and governance".

According to a report by The Hindu, there was discomfort within sections of Nagaland after the government decided to bring other Naga armed groups on board under the aegis of the Naga National Political Groups (NNGP). The report states that certain sections in Nagaland suspect that this was done by the government to exploit existing divisions between the Nagas.

In August 2020, National Socialist Council of Nagaland released copies of the confidential Framework Agreement (FA). The Naga groups were insisting on changing the interlocutor R. N. Ravi. and the release of copies of agreement was a result of chain of events that emanated from this demand. In October 2020, the current chief of NSCN-IM Thuingaleng Muivah expressed strong reservations against moving forward with the agreement in a 55 minute long interview given to Karan Thapar.

=== Deadlines ===
The Centre's interlocutor and Nagaland Governor RN Ravi had stated that the NSCN (I-M)'s demand for a separate flag and constitution would not be fulfilled, and had accused the organisation of delaying talks. Ravi had said the NSCN(I-M) had taken a "procrastinating attitude" to delay the settlement.

On October 28, a team of the NSCN (I-M), led by its general secretary Thuingaleng Muivah and Ravi met again to discuss the possible ways of finding an "honourable" solution by resolving the sticky issue of a separate flag and Constitution for the Nagas. "The dialogue, which lasted for more than four hours, remained inconclusive and both sides agreed to meet again soon. However, a final agreement between the NSCN (I-M) and the government is unlikely to take place by October 31, 2019" an official privy to the development.

As of October 2020, the final agreement hasn't taken place and differences emerged out of demand for special flag, constitution, and greater Nagalim by NSCN (IM) is delaying and fatiguing the talk process.

=== Impact ===
NSCN (I-M)'s idea of a Nagalim, which includes parts of Arunachal Pradesh, Assam and Manipur, has alarmed these states. Civil society organisations in the three states have stated that no compromise on their territorial integrity would be accepted. But they have reasons to be wary, since NSCN (I-M) is considered to be one of the largest rebel groups in the sub-continent with access to sophisticated weaponry, its actions are bound to affect the states in a negative manner. However, the respective state governments have decided to adopt a "wait and watch" attitude until the final peace deal is announced.
