= Siege of Mukalimi =

Armed conflict in Nagaland, India

- Part of the Naga Interfactional Conflicts within the Insurgency in Nagaland, Insurgency in Northeast India
- Sumi Martyr's Day celebrations
Date	26–30 December 2013
Location	Mukalimi, Nagaland, India
Result	Sumi Hoho victory
Territorial changes	NSCN(IM) vacates the camp

Belligerents
Sumi Hoho: Sumi Totimi Hoho; Sumi Students Union; Sumi Gaon Bura Hoho; NSCN-K (NSCN-IM claim)	NSCN-IM: Zazibituo Battalion

Strength
6,000 - 10,000	Unknown

Casualties and losses
7+ killed	5+ killed (Assam Rifles claim); 1 injured (NSCN claim) 1 executed

The siege of Mukalimi was an armed conflict that occurred from 26 December – 30 December 2013, in the Mukalimi area of Nagaland, India. The siege resulted from escalating tensions following an incident on 21 December 2013, when two Sumi women were allegedly strip-searched by NSCN-IM cadres at a checkpoint.

== Background ==
Tensions had been simmering in the region due to various factors, including discontent over the NSCN-IM's activities, dissatisfaction with the peace process, and longstanding tribal rivalries. The NSCN-IM, predominantly composed of the Tangkhul tribe, had been engaged in an armed struggle for Naga self-determination since the late 20th century. However, their methods and territorial ambitions often clashed with other Naga tribes, such as the Sumi Naga. During the NSCN takeover of Nagaland, the NSCN had killed dozens of Sumi Naga civilians and militants alike, and ever since relations between the two sides remained strained.

Furthermore, this incident occurred during a time of turmoil within Nagaland, as the number of NSCN-related clashes began to increase, mostly due to interfactional clashes. Additionally, numerous protests had erupted within the state protesting the NSCN-IM's taxation of villagers.

== 21 December incident ==
On 21 December 2013, NSCN-IM cadres allegedly attempted to rape and molest two Sumi women at a checkpoint near Aghuito town. This incident sparked outrage among the Sumi community, prompting demands for the perpetrators to be handed over to the authorities for prosecution. Despite the NSCN-IM's internal disciplinary actions against the accused cadre, the Sumi Hoho (tribal council) insisted on legal recourse. When NSCN failed to answer to Sumi Hoho demands to hand over the accused militants, breakdown in negotiations occurred. Furthermore, the Sumi Naga community, resentful of NSCN-IM's presence and actions in their territory, sought justice for the alleged assault on the two women, further leading to mounting tensions.

== Siege ==
=== Start of siege ===
Following the failure to resolve the issue peacefully, thousands of Sumi volunteers, organized by the Sumi Totimi Hoho, Sumi Students Union, and Sumi Gaon Bura Hoho, mobilized under the banner of the Sumi Hoho and marched towards the NSCN-IM designated camp at Mukalimi on 26 December 2013. The objective of the "Flush out Mission" was to compel the NSCN-IM to vacate Sumi areas and deliver justice for the 21 December incident.

=== Firing and fighting ===
By 28 December, the siege had escalated into violent confrontations, with both sides exchanging fire. NSCN-IM cadres, armed with rifles and other firearms, engaged in clashes with Sumi volunteers, mostly armed with older hunting rifles, as well as traditional weapons like machetes and wooden implements. The NSCN-IM claimed that the Sumi volunteers were being aided by the NSCN-K. The fighting resulted in casualties on both sides, with 5 Sumi Naga being killed in firing on 28 December alone. Reports indicated heavy and intermittent firing throughout the siege, with Sumi volunteers cutting off reinforcements, as well as water lines, to the NSCN-IM camp. On 29 December, at least one more Sumi volunteer had been killed in the fighting, with both sides growing increasingly entrenched in their positions.

=== Ceasefire ===
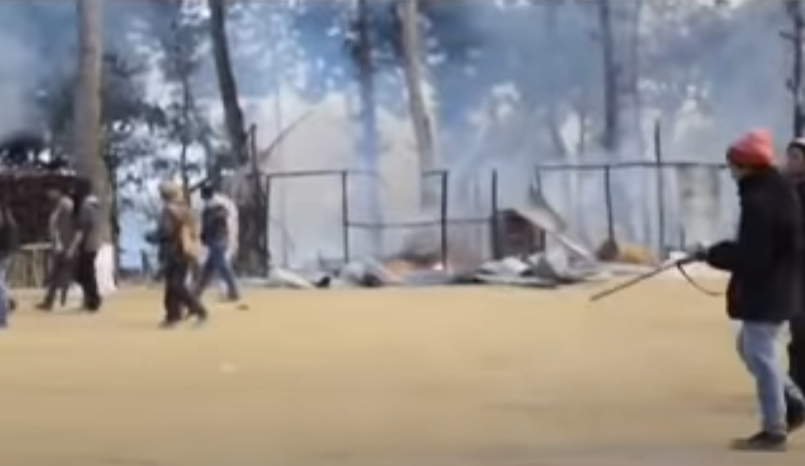
Sumi Volunteers razing a NSCN camp during the siege of Mukalimi

After several days of intense fighting, a ceasefire was eventually brokered on 30 December, facilitated by the Assam Rifles. The NSCN-IM cadres agreed to vacate the Mukalimi camp, and safe passage was provided for their withdrawal, but not before a brief clash led to one Sumi volunteer being injured. The ceasefire brought a halt to the firing, allowing for the evacuation of injured Sumi Naga volunteers for medical treatment. On the hill, the dead bodies of 5 NSCN militants was found by the Assam Rifles, a claim which was refuted by the NSCN. The camp was then razed by the Sumi volunteers.

== Aftermath ==
On 31 December, NSCN-IM stated that the outfit had found 3 people, Sergeant Mapam Keishing, Corporal Mahori, and Private Ninoto guilty of the rape of 2 women at 21 December. Sgt. Keishing was awarded capital punishment 2 days before the announcement, on 29 December.

On 2 January 2014, the Sumi Hoho declared 28 December as "Martyrs' Day", in order to honour the fallen volunteers during the siege. Furthermore, on 7 January, the Sumi Baghi Hoho passed four resolutions, aiming to delink all ties with NSCN-IM with immediate effect, and thus eliminating any taxation paid to the NSCN-IM.

On 23 January, another Sumi volunteer who had been injured in the fighting died at a hospital in Shillong, raising the death toll on the Sumi side to at least 7.
