= S. S. Khaplang =

Naga insurgent leader (1940–2017)

Shangwang Shangyung Khaplang
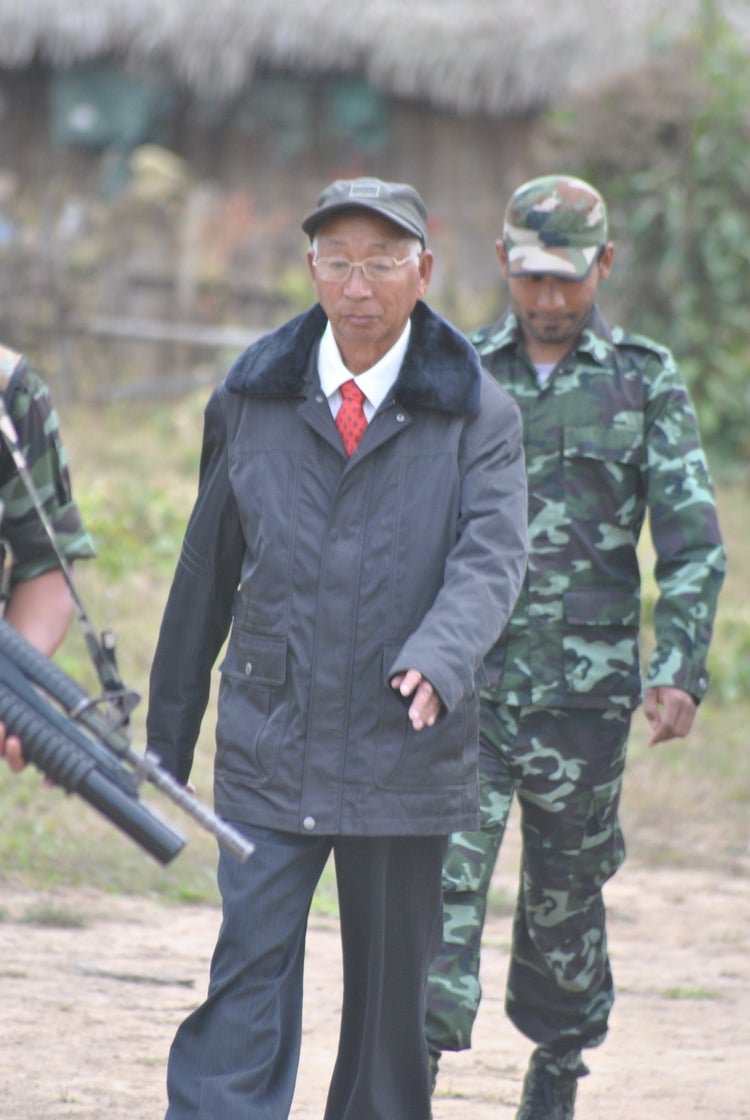
- Khaplang at a camp in Myanmar in 2011
- Born: Shangwang Shangyung Khaplang; April 1940; Waktham, Myanmar
- Died: 9 June 2017 (aged 77); Taga, Kachin, Myanmar
- Movement: Naga nationalism

Shangwang Shangyung Khaplang (April 1940 – 9 June 2017) was a Naga separatist leader who led the NSCN-K, an insurgent group that operates to establish the country of Nagalim, a sovereign state bringing all Naga-inhabited areas of Myanmar and India under one administrative setup.

== Early life ==
Khaplang was born in Waktham in April 1940, a village east of Myanmar's Pangsau Pass as the youngest of ten children. Born into Hemi Naga tribe that lived predominantly in Myanmar, his early childhood was shaped by the opening up of isolated Naga communities by the World War II.

During the War, the Western Allies built the 1,726 kilometres (1,072 mi) long Stilwell Road connecting Ledo in India's Assam to China's Kunming to carry supplies against the Japanese Army, that passed through Waktham. This was said to have "sowed the seeds of insurgency in Khaplang." Khaplang claimed that he first attended a school in Margherita, a town in Assam before joining Baptist Mission School in Myitkyina in Myanmar's Kachin State in 1959, and in 1961 to another missionary school in Kalay before he eventually dropped out.

== Insurgent activity ==
Allegedly influenced by the events of the War during his childhood, Khaplang founded the Naga Defence Force (NDF) in 1964 to operate towards a separate sovereign state for the Naga people. In 1965, he co-founded Eastern Naga Revolutionary Council (ENRC) that he later became the vice-chairman and then the chairman of. The two organizations helped Naga nationalist leader Angami Zapu Phizo's Naga National Council (NNC) to travel to China for weapons and training young recruits. Later, the two merged with the NNC and Khaplang became its chairman in 1974. During one of these visits, he met Thuingaleng Muivah, involved then with the NNC. They, along with another leader Isak Chishi Swu subsequently formed a partnership in revolting against the NNC for signing the Shillong Accord of 1975 that accepted the supremacy of the Indian Constitution. They broke away and formed the National Socialist Council of Nagaland (NSCN) in 1980. The NSCN became very powerful and by 1985, it was running a parallel government in Nagaland, also extending its influence to adjoining districts of the neighbouring Indian States of Manipur and Arunachal Pradesh. It was being called the 'mother of all insurgencies'.

However, in April 1988, the NSCN split into two factions: the NSCN-K led by Khaplang, and the NSCN-IM, led by Swu and Muivah. Khaplang had made unsuccessful assassination attempt on Muivah. By 1989, the NSCN-K had driven out all Indian Naga people from Myanmar and the NSCN-IM shifted base to Thailand. Khaplang's influence in the region spread around this time. In addition to insurgent and anti-establishment activity, he gave space to other separatist outfits such as United Liberation Front of Assam (ULFA) and I. K. Songbijit's faction of National Democratic Front of Bodoland (NDFB (Songbijit)), Kamtapur Liberation Organisation (KLO), Kangleipak Communist Party and Kanglei Yawol Kanna Lup to set up hideouts alongside the NSCN-K's headquarters. While operating mostly in Nagaland, the NSCN-K subsequently made inroads into Changlang and Tirap districts of the neighbouring Arunachal Pradesh and later Assam.

On 28 April 2001, the NSCN-K signed an agreement to one-year ceasefire with the government of India starting the same day. Khaplang announced of abrogating the agreement in March 2015. In April, leaders of the ULFA, NDFB (Songbijit), KLO and Khaplang of the NSCN-K assembled in Taga in Myanmar to form the United Liberation Front of Western South East Asia (UNLFW) to achieve "united and total struggle" against the Indian establishment. Khaplang was chosen as the chairman. In June, the UNLFW killed 18 personnel while injuring over a dozen others Indian Army in an ambush in Manipur's Chandel district, the deadliest on the Army since 1983. In September 2015, the Ministry of Home Affairs declared NSCN-K an 'unlawful organisation' for a period of five years, under the Unlawful Activities (Prevention) Act; a bounty of ₹7 lakh was declared by the National Investigation Agency for providing information on Khaplang.

== Death ==
In his later life, Khaplang developed diabetes and other age-related ailments. He died of cardiac arrest on 9 June 2017 in Taga, in the Naga Self-Administered Zone, Sagaing Region of Myanmar, where the NSCN-K was based during the time. It was reported that he had returned from China after a treatment and was to head to Waktham, his birthplace. Talking to media outlet, Times of Assam, Isak Sumi of NSCN(K) reported that, "the funeral will be held at their CHQ today in the presence of today in presence of all the leaders of UNLFW(WESA). Following his death, the then Chief Minister of Nagaland Shurhozelie Liezietsu revealed that "provided issues of substance were discussed", Khaplang was willing "to have dialogue with the government". Liezietsu added that, "It is tragic that such an important Naga leader like Mr Khaplang passed away at a time when the Naga political problem is on the verge of being resolved, and the need for all different Naga political groups to come together to air our views and aspirations to the Government of India in one voice is absolutely imperative."
