= Reivilie Angami =

- Born: 1923; Jotsoma, Naga Hills District, Assam Province, British India (Now in Kohima District, Nagaland, India)
- Died: 18 February 1998 (aged 74–75); Vidima, Dimapur District, Nagaland, India (Now in Chümoukedima District, Nagaland, India)

Reivilie Angami (1923–1998) was a Naga insurgent who served in the British Indian Army from 1943 to 1948 and went on to join the Naga National Council in 1949, rising to the position of Brigadier within the insurgency.

== Early life ==
Angami was born in 1923 in Jotsoma Village, Kohima District, Nagaland. He joined the Assam Regiment of the British Indian Army on 23 July 1943 and trained as a soldier in Happy Valley, Assam.

== Service in the British Indian Army ==
During World War II he fought with the Allied Forces in the Naga Hills, Manipur and Burma, where he earned the Burma Star for his services from 1939 to 1946 and the Indian Independence Medal for his services in 1947. He was also awarded the Gallantry Certificate and released from service in October 1948.

== Nagaland Insurgency ==
After returning from his service in the Assam Regiment, he joined the Naga National Council in 1949 and his enthusiasm for Naga Struggle intensified after the martyrdom of his uncle Zasibituo Nagi, the first Naga Martyr at Kohima on 18 October 1952. He formed the Naga Home Guard and the Naga Army along with Comrade Dotsolie Vihienuo and served the Naga insurgency in various capacities. In 1976, he led his former Naga Army comrades to Chümoukedima and established a new village, Vidima, in Chümoukedima District and continued his Service towards the Naga Struggle. He died on 18 February 1998.
