= Angami Zapu Phizo =

Naga nationalist militant leader (1904–1990)

- A. Z. Phizo, c. 1960s
- Born: Zapu Phizo; 16 May 1904; Khonoma, Naga Hills District, Assam Province, British India
- Died: 30 April 1990 (aged 85); Bromley, London, United Kingdom
- Resting place: A. Z. Phizo Memorial, Kohima, Nagaland, India
- Citizenship: British (from exile); formerly British Indian
- Known for: President of the Naga National Council; leader of the Naga nationalist movement; architect of the Federal Government of Nagaland
- Spouse: Jwane Phizo
- Children: 11
- Relatives: Kevi Yallay (younger brother); Adinno Phizo (daughter, successor as NNC president)

Angami Zapu Phizo (16 May 1904 – 30 April 1990) was a Naga nationalist militant leader who was the president of the Naga National Council (NNC) from 1949 until his death. He led campaigns for a separate Naga state in South Asia.

Born in Khonoma, Assam Province, British India, he rose from relative obscurity within the early Naga political movement to become its most uncompromising and internationally recognised voice. Phizo declared Naga independence on 14 August 1947, one day before India gained its own independence from British colonial rule, and subsequently conducted a plebiscite in 1951 in which the overwhelming majority of participating Nagas stated their desire to remain a free and sovereign nation.

When peaceful engagement with the Indian government broke down irrevocably in the mid-1950s, Phizo established an armed underground administration, the Federal Government of Nagaland, and later made a clandestine journey to the West to place the Naga case before the international community. He spent the final three decades of his life in exile in London, where he continued to press the Naga cause through diplomacy, journalism, and public advocacy until his death in 1990. He is regarded as a highly influential figure among Nagas across the political spectrum.

== Background and family ==
To understand Phizo, one must first understand Khonoma. The village sits on a high ridge in the Angami heartland of the Naga Hills, roughly 20 kilometres west of Kohima, at an altitude that made it naturally fortified and historically resistant to outside authority. Khonoma's Angami inhabitants had been among the last in the region to submit to British colonial control, and the village remained a symbol of pride and defiance long after that submission was formally made. The community practised intensive terrace agriculture, unusual among the Naga tribes, and maintained a reputation for self-sufficiency and vigour that its people carried into every sphere of life.

The final Anglo-Naga confrontation at Khonoma took place in 1880, following a series of earlier clashes dating to 1847. The battle saw the Nagas ultimately defeated after a lengthy siege, but the story of that resistance was handed down through Khonoma's oral tradition with great care and intensity. Phizo's great-uncle, Pelhu, had commanded the Naga defenders in the last stand and famously refused all British overtures toward negotiation or surrender. Phizo was keenly aware of this family legacy. In later life he stated plainly that his own family were historically "the ones who made history for the Nagas," and he saw himself as continuing a lineage of anti-colonial resistance that stretched back generations.

Phizo was born on 16 May 1904 into the Merhuma clan (khel) of Khonoma and belonged to the Angami tribe. As a child he suffered a paralytic attack that left his face visibly twisted for the rest of his life, a physical mark that those who met him often noted with some surprise given the commanding quality of his presence and speech. He grew up in a household that was deeply conscious of the village's historical importance, and from an early age internalised a worldview in which the Nagas were a distinct people with their own history, customs, and entitlements.

== Education and early formation ==
After spending his early years in Khonoma, Phizo moved to attend the Kohima Mission School, which had been established by American Baptist missionaries who had been active in the Naga Hills from the 1870s onward. In 1922 he was baptised by Dr. Sydney W. Rivenburg, a committed American missionary and evangelist who ran schools across the Naga Hills with the dual aim of providing education and propagating the Baptist faith. Rivenburg saw Naga education not as an intrinsic good in itself but as a means of fashioning a modern Naga Christian subject, and his schools worked to socialise converts into Western habits of time, hygiene, and dress. Phizo absorbed both the Christian and the educational dimensions of the missionary project, becoming a committed Baptist whose faith remained a bedrock of his personal identity and political vision throughout his life, while simultaneously developing a conception of Naga nationhood that drew on pre-colonial traditions of village self-governance rather than any external framework.

The model of the Khonoma village community exercised a lasting influence on his political imagination. He envisioned the future Naga state not as a centralised bureaucratic structure on the model of the Indian or British state, but as a scaled-up version of the village republic, in which individual families and communities retained full authority over their own land and affairs, and in which decisions were made collectively through a nested system of local, tribal, and regional councils, with the Federal Government of Nagaland at the apex as a coordinating rather than dominating institution. Naga mutual interdependence, Phizo maintained, would underpin a system of village republics in which each family or tribe would have full authority over its own affairs, including land, community organisation, and social and religious customs. Village chiefs were to be first among equals, and decisions concerning multiple villages would be made through group, tribal, and regional councils ascending toward the FGN at the top.

In the years before Indian independence, Phizo worked for some time in Burma, where he came into contact with the Imperial Japanese Army during the Second World War. He sided with the Japanese forces and collaborated with them, a decision driven not by any ideological affinity with Japanese militarism but by the Japanese promise to recognise Nagaland as an independent sovereign state if they prevailed in the conflict. The majority of Nagas did not side with the Japanese and remained loyal to the British, providing guides, porters, and intelligence throughout the Battle of Kohima in 1944. The Japanese offer came to nothing after the Allied victory at Kohima and Imphal, but Phizo's wartime calculation reflected a strategic disposition he would employ throughout his career: seeking the support of whichever outside power appeared most likely to advance the cause of Naga independence, regardless of that power's broader ideology.

== Entry into politics and early activism ==
The political awakening of the Nagas as a collective entity had begun well before Phizo's rise to prominence. The Naga Club, formed on 15 January 1918 by educated Nagas including government employees and veterans of World War I, had submitted a memorandum to the Simon Commission in 1929 stating clearly that the Nagas had nothing in common with the peoples of the Indian plains and requesting that the Naga Hills be administered directly by the British government rather than through Assam or any future Indian dominion. As a result of that memorandum, the Naga Hills were placed outside the Reformed Scheme in the Government of India Act of 1935 and classified as an Excluded Area. By the mid-1940s, as Indian independence appeared increasingly inevitable, the Naga Club reorganised itself into a formal political body, the Naga National Council, with the objective of working out the Nagas' relationship with whatever authority would succeed the British.

Phizo entered this political arena in the late 1940s. Before rising to the NNC leadership he had led a separate organisation called the People's Independence League, which advocated outright independence without qualification. As the British departure from India drew near, he took it upon himself to reach out to the leaders of other hill peoples in northeastern India, meeting separately with representatives of the Assamese, Garo, Khasi, Lushai, Abor, Mishmi, and Meitei communities. His goal was to persuade each of these groups to pursue independent statehood rather than joining the proposed Union of India, thereby creating a series of sovereign buffer states along India's northeastern frontier. None of these overtures succeeded.

In July 1947, Phizo led an eleven-member delegation to New Delhi to meet Mahatma Gandhi at his Bhangi Colony residence. The meeting has assumed an almost mythic character in Naga nationalist memory. In Naga accounts, Gandhi assured the delegation that the Nagas had every right to independence if they chose not to join the Union of India, and that no one would force them to do so. When the delegates raised the fear that Assam Governor Sir Akbar Hydari was threatening to use military force against the Nagas, Gandhi reportedly exclaimed that Hydari was wrong and declared that he would come to the Naga Hills himself and be the first to be shot before any Naga was harmed. Gandhi went as far as to say "Why wait until 14th August? Why not even declare your independence tomorrow?" The NNC secretary T. Sakhrie had expressed similar fears in a letter to Gandhi prior to the meeting, writing that the Indian government might use military force to occupy the Naga territory. Gandhi was assassinated in January 1948, before he could act on any such undertaking.

On 19 July 1947, the deputy commissioner C. R. Pawsey sent a telegram via Governor Hydari dismissing the Naga delegation as representing an "unimportant minority" and advising that they be ignored, though the telegram may have arrived too late to prevent the meeting with Gandhi. A month before the Gandhi meeting, on 26 June 1947, the NNC and Sir Akbar Hydari, then Governor of Assam, had signed the Nine-Point Agreement, also known as the Hydari Accord. The agreement recognised the right of the Nagas to develop themselves according to their freely expressed wishes and created a framework under which a Guardian Power, represented by the Assam Governor, would oversee Naga affairs for ten years, after which the Nagas could choose to extend the arrangement or negotiate a new one. Naga nationalists interpreted the ten-year clause as a firm promise that India would respect Naga independence at the end of that period. The Indian government interpreted it as providing no such guarantee, and Prime Minister Jawaharlal Nehru, who had not been prime minister when the accord was signed, declined to treat it as binding. By 1951 the Indian government formally repudiated the agreement, informing the Nagas that it would no longer be considered operative in any form.

On 14 August 1947, the day before India's own independence, Phizo formally declared the independence of the Naga people at Kohima, hoisted the Naga national flag, and sent telegrams to the United Nations in New York, to the British government, and to the new Indian government in New Delhi. The telegram to New Delhi was intercepted by the district administration and never delivered. Scholar Shibani Kinkar Chaube has observed that there is no conclusive evidence that the NNC as an organisation had formally resolved to make this declaration, and that it was primarily Phizo's personal initiative.

== Arrest and rise to the NNC presidency ==
In 1948, Phizo was arrested and imprisoned in Presidency Jail, Calcutta, on charges related to stirring trouble in the Indo-Burma borderland. He wrote from the prison to C. Rajagopalachari, the first Governor-General of independent India, providing his account of the circumstances surrounding the Hydari Agreement and protesting the Indian government's treatment of the Nagas. From prison he continued to articulate the Naga case, insisting that the Indian government had entered into a binding agreement with the Nagas and was now betraying it.

After his release, Phizo's influence within the NNC grew steadily. The NNC secretary Imti Aliba Ao had retired from politics to take up a position in the Indian Frontier Administrative Services, leaving a vacuum in the organisation's moderate wing. In October and November 1949, Phizo contested and won the NNC chairmanship, defeating Vizar Angami of Zakhama village by a single vote. He was formally elected president of the NNC on 28 December 1950. Many Nagas had become deeply frustrated with the Indian government's effective repudiation of the Hydari Accord, and Phizo's uncompromising position resonated with the mood of the time.

Under Phizo's presidency the NNC made a decisive turn away from any accommodation with the Indian state and toward an increasingly assertive demand for full sovereign independence. He immediately set about unifying the various regional and tribal groupings within the NNC into a coherent nationalist coalition, travelling extensively across the Naga Hills to build grassroots support. On a 1952 visit to Kütsapomi village in southern Nagaland, he emphasised the interconnection of Christianity, sovereignty, and education as the three pillars of the Naga national cause. He also frequently discussed economic self-reliance and the collective stewardship of land as integral to the preservation of Naga identity and patrimony.

Working alongside Phizo during this period was Theyiechüthie Sakhrie, the NNC secretary and editor of the Naga Nation newspaper, who had attended university in Calcutta and represented the more moderate, realistic wing of the nationalist movement. Despite coming from different clans, both Sakhrie and Phizo were Angami Nagas from Khonoma, and the tension between their approaches would eventually produce a tragic rupture.

== The 1951 plebiscite ==
One of the most consequential acts of Phizo's presidency was the organisation of a national plebiscite on the question of Naga independence. In February 1950, the NNC declared its intention to hold a referendum. The Government of India condemned the proposal, calling the NNC "the voice of the misguided" and refusing to participate or to send official observers, despite a formal invitation from the NNC to the President of India to delegate representatives to witness the proceedings. The NNC pressed ahead regardless. The inaugural function was held in Kohima on 16 May 1951, on Phizo's birthday, and approximately six thousand people attended. The plebiscite was conducted across the Naga Hills over the following weeks, and the NNC claimed that 99.9 percent of those who voted had declared themselves in favour of Naga sovereignty and independence from India. The result was cabled to the United Nations, which acknowledged its receipt. The Indian Government and the Government of Assam rejected the result as invalid, pointing out that the government had banned its own employees from participating, that the plebiscite had not been conducted in all Naga-inhabited areas, and that the claimed percentage was implausibly high. Regardless of these objections, the plebiscite became a foundational document in Naga nationalist self-understanding, and Phizo referred to its mandate consistently for the rest of his life.

== Meetings with Nehru and breakdown of negotiations ==
Phizo met Prime Minister Jawaharlal Nehru on three occasions in an attempt to find a negotiated settlement. The first meeting was held in December 1951 near Tezpur in Assam, the second in March 1952 in Delhi, and the third in July 1952 at Dibrugarh. Phizo also met Jaipal Singh, the prominent tribal politician and member of the Constituent Assembly, in 1952. None of these meetings produced a resolution. Nehru was unwilling to countenance any formula that implied Naga independence or even the possibility of future secession, and Phizo was equally unwilling to accept any arrangement that fell short of full sovereignty. The communications between the two men reflected a mutual incomprehension as much as a genuine political disagreement: Nehru appears to have believed that Phizo represented only a small educated minority of Nagas, while Phizo was convinced that the Indian leadership was deliberately evading a clear and legitimate claim. The NNC boycotted India's first general elections in 1952, reinforcing the perception in New Delhi that the Naga nationalist leadership was working against the Indian state rather than within it.

== Formation of the underground government ==
As the possibility of a peaceful resolution receded, Phizo moved toward the creation of a parallel political and military structure that would give institutional form to the Naga independence claim. In September 1954, he formed the "People's Sovereign Republic of Free Nagaland" with the support of the Chang chiefs of Tuensang district, bringing the eastern Naga areas into a closer relationship with the Kohima-centred NNC. He reorganised the NNC's internal structure as the chances of a peaceful settlement declined.

Police raids on NNC offices and the homes of prominent Nagas became increasingly frequent during 1953. The Angami leaders T. Sakhrie and John Bosco Jasokie broke with Phizo at a meeting in Khonoma village in 1955, with Sakhrie taking a more conciliatory position toward the Indian government. Sakhrie's defection was experienced by Phizo's faction not merely as a political betrayal but as a personal one, given the shared village origin of the two men. The break between the families and clans of Khonoma, specifically Phizo's Dolie clan and Sakhrie's Lievüse clan, over the political future of the Nagas produced revenge killings and blood feuds that lasted for generations and blurred the line between the political and the personal in the Naga conflict in ways that have never been fully resolved.

In January 1956, Phizo arranged for Sakhrie to be murdered. Sakhrie was killed by members of Phizo's faction, an act that represented the starkest and most controversial decision of Phizo's career, one that his admirers have contextualised within the brutal realities of armed conflict and that his critics have condemned as political murder. Other dissenting leaders, including Jasokie and Silie, sought refuge with the Indian government thereafter.

On 22 March 1956, Phizo proclaimed the establishment of the "Naga Central Government," which was later renamed the Federal Government of Nagaland (FGN) in 1959. The new body had a military wing, the Naga Federal Army, and constituted an underground parallel state that claimed sovereign authority over the Naga people. The Naga Hills District was formally declared a Disturbed Area by the Indian government in January 1956, placing it under direct military command, and the Indian Army deployed in earnest in April 1956. The resulting conflict caused widespread suffering among the civilian population of the Naga Hills, with villages burned, people displaced, and allegations of serious human rights violations by the Indian Army accumulating over several years. The Armed Forces Special Powers Act was enacted in 1958 to give the military broad powers in the region.

== Escape to East Pakistan ==
Phizo dissolved the above-ground NNC in May 1956 and went underground. In December of that year he fled the Naga Hills into East Pakistan (present-day Bangladesh), evading Indian security forces in a crossing of the border. He had no Indian passport and left Nagaland with little more than the strength of his political convictions. The Pakistani government was wary of Phizo and kept him under close watch in Dhaka. Pakistan had its own internal nationality problems and was unwilling to actively support Naga separatism in a manner that might encourage analogous movements within its own borders. China, despite its hostility to India, was also cautious about openly championing anti-Indian nationalist movements given its own concerns about Tibetan separatism.

Evidence from 1958 statements given to the Indian police by Nagas captured while returning from East Pakistan suggests that Phizo spent time in Dhaka speaking with high officials of the Pakistani and American governments, though what substantive commitments, if any, were made remains unclear. The Pakistanis effectively immobilised Phizo and he could see no path forward toward the international recognition he sought from within East Pakistan.

== The journey to London ==
Making his way eventually to Zürich, Phizo found himself stranded in Switzerland, in possession of a false Salvadoran passport and with no obvious route to the international audience he needed to reach. Through family contacts, his situation came to the attention of the Reverend Michael Scott, an Anglican clergyman and veteran anti-apartheid activist who had spent nearly two decades representing the Herero people of Namibia before the United Nations. Scott was a figure of considerable moral authority in progressive Western circles and had close working relationships with leading members of the Indian government, including Prime Minister Nehru and Vijayalakshmi Pandit, Nehru's sister and the Indian High Commissioner to London in 1960. Taking up the Naga cause, Scott recognised, would risk those important friendships. He also worried that the Naga issue might distract from his established Africa-focused advocacy work. Yet after reviewing the Naga materials and the claims of Indian military atrocities that Phizo's supporters had compiled, Scott concluded that the Naga case had sufficient moral weight to warrant his involvement.

The process through which Phizo reached Scott was itself a remarkable transatlantic effort. Phizo's nephew, known by the surname Challe and living in Chicago, had read an article in the New York Times about the Herero petitioning the United Nations with Scott's assistance and immediately saw it as a model for the Naga cause. Challe wrote to Scott, who did not reply to the first letter. Challe then wrote to Laura Maud Thompson, an American anthropologist based in Brooklyn who had conducted fieldwork in Melanesia and Micronesia and who had taught Challe's wife, Tefta Zografi Iralu, at the University of North Carolina. Thompson then also wrote to Scott, amplifying the request. This web of correspondence and personal connections eventually persuaded Scott to act.

In June 1960, Scott travelled to Zürich and personally brought Phizo to London. Under the designation of "former imperial citizen," Phizo was provisionally admitted into the United Kingdom. The last British district commissioner to the Naga Hills, Charles Pawsey, who had interacted with the Nagas throughout the final years of British rule, vouched for Phizo's identity in London. Scott gave Phizo an office at the Africa Bureau, a nongovernmental organisation in the heart of London that focused on African anticolonial nationalism. Phizo arrived on 12 June 1960, in a year when 17 African colonies achieved independence and the question of postcolonial self-determination was at the forefront of international political discourse.

== Activities in London and international advocacy ==
Phizo threw himself into the work of international advocacy with extraordinary energy. He quickly produced a booklet entitled The Fate of the Naga People: An Appeal to the World, which he self-published in London in 1960 and submitted as a memorandum to the United Nations headquarters in New York on 8 October 1960. He held a public press conference in London on 26 July 1960, presenting the history of the Naga independence claim to an international audience. He sought to place the Naga case within the framework of the global wave of decolonisation, arguing that the Nagas' situation was analogous to that of the peoples of Africa who were being recognised as entitled to self-determination, and that the selective application of self-determination principles to serve the interests of established states rather than genuinely oppressed peoples represented a fundamental injustice.

The media attention generated by Phizo's London presence was considerable. David Astor, the editor of the Observer newspaper, took up the Naga cause and published a series of articles highlighting the conflict in Nagaland and the Indian government's conduct of the counterinsurgency campaign. In one editorial, Astor argued that minority problems involving peoples in this situation were as likely as any other single factor to cause international conflict in the modern world. Phizo also appeared in public forums across Britain and later visited the United States to lobby for the Naga cause, though the issue was never successfully raised in a formal United Nations proceeding. The UN system, which had abolished the League of Nations' petitioning processes and focused exclusively on the rights of states and individuals within states, offered no procedural channel through which a stateless people could formally present its case.

The Naga People's Convention, a body established with the support and encouragement of the Indian government as a moderate counterweight to the NNC, signed a sixteen-point agreement with New Delhi on 26 July 1960, while Phizo was simultaneously holding his press conference in London. The NNC rejected and condemned this agreement as a betrayal and a device to circumvent the legitimate nationalist leadership. The State of Nagaland was formally established by the Indian Parliament on 21 August 1962 and came into existence on 1 December 1963. From the NNC's perspective, the creation of the state only partially addressed the Naga claim, as it covered only a portion of the Naga-inhabited territories and did not acknowledge Naga sovereignty.

On 11 February 1962, Phizo formally accused the Government of India of genocide against the Naga people and referred the matter to the International Commission of Jurists. The allegation drew significant international attention, though it did not result in any formal international investigation or censure of India. Phizo also attempted to gain the support of the Nepalese government for the Naga case at the United Nations; declassified British intelligence documents reveal that Nepal indicated a willingness in June 1962 to provide written support to the Naga delegation at the UN, though this support never materialised in a meaningful form. David Astor also reportedly approached the Republic of Ireland to raise the Naga issue at the UN.

In 1963, Reverend Scott and others including Jayaprakash Narayan and Assam Chief Minister B. P. Chaliha formed a Peace Mission to Nagaland that attempted to broker a ceasefire and open political dialogue between the Indian government and the Naga underground. A ceasefire agreement was signed on 23 May 1964 at Sakraba village in Phek district, though it was not publicly announced until 6 September 1964. The ceasefire held long enough to enable six rounds of talks in Delhi between 1966 and 1967 conducted under Prime Minister Indira Gandhi. Gandhi offered the Nagas extensive autonomy within the Indian Union but would not concede sovereignty, and the underground leadership rejected this offer, so the talks collapsed in 1967. Scott was arrested and deported from India in May 1966, a dramatic reversal from the days when the Indian delegation at the United Nations had facilitated his advocacy on behalf of Namibian nationalists.

Phizo remained in London throughout these years, directing the FGN's strategy from exile and maintaining contact with the underground leadership inside Nagaland. The distances involved, physical, political, and emotional, created mounting frustrations and resentments among the underground fighters, who faced the daily dangers of the conflict while their president issued communiqués and held press conferences in London. General Kaito Sukhai, the leader of the NNC's armed forces and a member of the Sumi tribe, was among those who grew increasingly angry at Phizo's absence. Tribal differences within the underground became more pronounced as the years passed, and disagreements over strategy strained the coherence of the movement. A faction of the underground did eventually accept Chinese assistance, with cadres travelling to Yunnan for arms training in the late 1960s, but this never fully resolved the ideological tensions within the NNC, particularly given Phizo's deep Christian convictions and his initial reluctance to ally with Communist powers.

Phizo deeply appreciated Western literature and used literary references in his correspondence. Writing to his nephew Challe from East Pakistan in January 1960, while still en route to Zürich, he quoted from George Bernard Shaw's The Devil's Disciple (1897) on the theme of indifference as the essence of inhumanity. He understood that the greatest danger to the Naga cause was not active opposition but the indifference of a world that did not know the Nagas existed, and he devoted his London years to ensuring they could not be ignored.

== The Shillong Accord and its aftermath ==
The most controversial episode of Phizo's later political life concerned the Shillong Accord of 11 November 1975. A section of the NNC underground, represented by a group that included Phizo's younger brother Kevi Yallay, signed an agreement with the Government of India under which the Naga underground organisations accepted the supremacy of the Indian Constitution without condition, agreed to surrender their arms, and renounced their demand for Naga secession from India. The accord was signed at Shillong, Meghalaya, with the Nagaland Governor Lallan Prasad Singh representing the Indian government and Kevi Yalie and other underground representatives signing on the Naga side.

Phizo himself was in London and was neither consulted about nor informed in advance of the accord. His position on the agreement was subsequently contested and became the source of bitter intra-movement controversy. Those who would go on to form the National Socialist Council of Nagaland accused Phizo of failing to condemn the accord, which they characterised as a sellout and a betrayal of the Naga mandate. NSCN leaders Isak Chishi Swu and Thuingaleng Muivah sent a seven-member delegation to London urging Phizo to condemn the agreement without delay.

Phizo's defenders, and Phizo himself in subsequent statements, insisted that he had in fact condemned the accord clearly. He wrote to P. Pushu Venuh, the then Vice President of the NNC, stating that he had nothing to do with the Shillong Accord and that if the Indian government thought a settlement had been made it could raise the issue and he would reply to it. He also publicly denied any acceptance of the accord in the London Times on 25 November 1975. He wrote personal letters to General Mowu Gwizantsu and several others expressing his view that the accord was absurd and without legal validity. His argument was that the accord lacked the official NNC seal, had not been signed by the six-member central political authority of the NNC (which included Phizo himself), and had used the deliberately vague term "underground organisation" rather than identifying the NNC by name, rendering it legally void as a treaty between the Indian government and the Naga people.

The NNC General Session held at Khonoma on 11 and 12 May 1978 deliberately ignored the Shillong Accord, taking the position that to keep raising it as an issue would effectively be to concede its legitimacy. But the damage to the movement's unity was severe. Isak Chishi Swu and Thuingaleng Muivah concluded that Phizo's ambiguity had made the NNC an unreliable vehicle for the independence cause. On 31 January 1980, they joined with S. S. Khaplang, a Hemi Naga from Myanmar, to form the National Socialist Council of Nagaland (NSCN), breaking away from the NNC and publicly branding Phizo as an "arch-traitor." Phizo had developed a deep personal distrust of Muivah, suspecting him of having adopted a Maoist revolutionary ideology that was fundamentally incompatible with the Christian Baptist values that underpinned the NNC's self-understanding. The NSCN split into two factions in 1988, NSCN(IM) under Isak and Muivah, and NSCN(K) under Khaplang, reflecting the tribal and political fractures that had been accumulating within the Naga movement for decades.

Phizo repudiated the Shillong Accord publicly and formally from London on 1 December 1975, and continued to maintain the NNC's position that the accord was invalid and that the Naga independence mandate remained in force. He did not return to Nagaland or to India during his lifetime; the Indian government never relented on the question of a visa.

== Political vision ==
Phizo's political thought was shaped by the convergence of several distinct intellectual and spiritual traditions. The foundational influence was the cultural memory of Khonoma village and the Angami tradition of collective self-governance rooted in the village republic. Phizo believed profoundly in a model of participatory democracy that predated and was independent of Western democratic theory, one in which each family and community had real authority over its own affairs, in which land was held collectively and maintained through shared stewardship, and in which decisions affecting multiple communities were made through graduated structures of representation. He saw the preservation of this system as inseparable from the preservation of Naga identity.

His Christian faith, absorbed at the Kohima Mission School and deepened throughout his life, gave his nationalism a providential dimension. He believed the Naga people had a God-given right to their land and sovereignty, and that the struggle for Naga independence was not merely a political project but a spiritual one. This religiosity distinguished him sharply from the Marxist-Maoist currents that influenced the NSCN after the break of 1980, and made the prospect of an alliance with Communist China always uncomfortable for Phizo personally, even when tactical necessity pushed elements of the NNC in that direction.

His reading was wide and eclectic. He admired George Bernard Shaw, and his letters and speeches drew on a range of Western literary and philosophical sources as well as Naga oral tradition. He was a persuasive public speaker who could address a Naga village assembly and a London press conference with equal effectiveness, adapting his idiom to his audience while maintaining a consistent underlying argument.

He understood, better than almost anyone else in the Naga movement, the structural constraints that prevented the international system from recognising the Naga claim. The United Nations was built around the rights of states, not of peoples, and the very nations that had championed decolonisation in Africa and Asia were themselves deeply invested in the principle of territorial integrity that made Naga sovereignty unrecognisable in international law. Phizo's strategy in London was accordingly to work through non-state channels, including media, civil society organisations, and sympathetic public figures, to build a pressure that the Indian government would find it diplomatically costly to ignore. Phizo himself wrote to his nephew: "Any organization without a sovereign territory cannot be articulately universal in its humanity," articulating his conviction that international recognition and physical sovereignty were inseparable.

== Personal life ==
The personal costs of Phizo's lifelong commitment to the Naga cause were enormous. His wife, Jwane Phizo, remained in Kohima throughout his exile. In 1955, before his flight from the Naga Hills, Indian armed forces arrested members of the Phizo family and imprisoned them in Kohima jail; after five months they were transferred to Nowgong Jail in Assam, where they remained for a total of nineteen months before being released. After Phizo acquired a British passport while in London, the Indian government refused to grant him a visa to visit India, meaning he was permanently separated from his wife and the homeland he had devoted his life to liberating. Phizo had eleven children in total, and the separation from his family compounded the isolation of exile.

Jwane Phizo, in a 1990 interview given at her Kohima home shortly after her husband's death, reflected with unusual candour on these circumstances. She noted that going to London had not been Phizo's personal choice or ambition; the NNC and the FGN had sent him abroad in 1956 when the hardship in Nagaland reached its peak, with the explicit mandate of telling the world about the condition of the Nagas. She also observed that it was because of Phizo's presence in London that the Indian government moderated its conduct in Nagaland, and that without that international scrutiny the situation might have been considerably worse. She and her husband communicated by letter and had not met in person for years at the time of his death.

=== Death ===
Phizo died quietly and peacefully at his house in Bromley, London, on 30 April 1990, at the age of 85. The news reached his family in Kohima and spread through the city by word of mouth with extraordinary speed. By the morning of 1 May 1990, an unprecedented crowd of Nagas had assembled at the Naga Club Building in Kohima and its surrounding premises, filling the space beyond capacity. A Funeral Organising Committee was selected by this assembly and later formally ratified by the Tatar Hoho, the parliament of the Federal Government of Nagaland.

The body was repatriated from London to Kohima, accompanied by J. P. Misra, a Gandhian social worker from Uttar Pradesh and a great admirer of Phizo, who travelled on his own account to accompany the remains home. The coffin, draped in the Naga national flag (a rainbow design on a blue background), was received at the Kohima Mission Compound, where Phizo and his wife Jwane had their home, and laid there for two hours so that she could be united with her husband for the last time. At midnight, the body was moved to the local football ground in Kohima, with the Naga national flag flying on a lofty post, to enable the pressing public to see the face of their revered leader and file past in final respect.

The queue of people waiting to file past the open casket stretched to thousands of metres in both directions from the gates of the football ground. From dawn until four o'clock in the afternoon of 11 May 1990, the queue did not shorten. Student volunteers eventually had to gently urge mourners past the casket at a count of every three seconds. The city of Kohima had never seen a crowd of that size in such complete and disciplined silence. The cortege, accompanied by Khonoma Baptist Church Pastor Keriu Mor, moved at a walking pace through the national highway, flanked on both sides by villagers holding lighted candles. As the procession neared the outskirts of Kohima at nightfall, the headlights of the accompanying vehicles stretching around the curves and corners of the mountain road were too numerous to count.

The funeral service was chaired by Chalie Kevichüsa. The Executive Secretary of the Nagaland Baptist Church Council, Reverend Ponsing Konyak, offered the invocation, and a hundred-voice choir from the Khedi Baptist Church sang "He Hid My Soul in the Cleft of the Rock," which was known to be one of Phizo's favourite hymns. Phizo was interred at the A. Z. Phizo Memorial in Kohima, on a hillock near the entrance to the Nagaland Civil Secretariat, establishing a site of national commemoration that has become a place of pilgrimage for Naga nationalists.

The repatriation of the body to Indian-administered territory generated some controversy among Naga nationalists, who noted the irony that a man who had spent 34 years in exile refusing to accept Indian sovereignty over Nagaland was buried in a land that India administered. Representatives from Khonoma village, Phizo's birthplace, also petitioned the Funeral Organising Committee to divert the body to Khonoma rather than burying it in Kohima, reflecting ongoing tensions over the symbolism of his resting place.

== Succession ==
Within three hours of Phizo's death on 30 April 1990, his colleagues Khodao Yanthan and Yongkong Nangshi, senior NNC Executive Council members who were present in London at the time, appointed his daughter Adinno Phizo as Acting President of the NNC at the London NNC office. Khodao Yanthan administered the oath of office and Reverend Dr V. K. Nuh offered an invocation prayer. Adinno was formally elected to the full presidency of the NNC by the people at a general meeting held on 12 May 1990 at Kohima Village Hall. This election was reaffirmed at a larger NNC General Meeting held on 14 and 15 March 1991 at Longmisa Village in the Ao region, attended by more than six thousand Nagas from all regions of Nagaland, at which political plenipotentiary power was conferred on her by Zashei Huire, President of the Federal Government of Nagaland.

The NNC thereafter split into two main factions. The NNC(A), or Adinno faction, followed Phizo's daughter and continued to uphold the original NNC position. The NNC(K) was headed by Khodao Yanthan, the former Vice President, who became a Vice President of the NSCN-IM in 1993 after eventually joining that organisation.

== Legacy ==
Phizo is universally referred to as "Father of the Naga Nation" and his image appears on walls, in churches, and in homes across Nagaland. His birthday, 16 May, is observed as Plebiscite Day in Naga nationalist calendars, commemorating the 1951 referendum whose mandate his successors continue to invoke. The A. Z. Phizo Memorial in Kohima is a site of regular observances and pilgrimages.

Khodao Yanthan's assessment, delivered in the years after Phizo's death, captured the feeling of many Nagas: "Mr. Phizo was a perfect Naga leader. I don't believe there will be any Naga leader like Mr. Phizo."

== Historiographical assessment ==
Historians and political scientists have assessed Phizo in different ways based on their political and methodological commitments. British administrator and anthropologist, Hutton blamed Phizo for killing his rivals in Nagaland. Hutton argued that the real reason Phizo had come to London was to escape reprisals at home. Ramachandra Guha provides a sympathetic but critical account of the Naga conflict that acknowledges the genuine grievances of the Naga people while contextualising Phizo's decisions within the broader history of Indian state-building. Shibani Kinkar Chaube offers a detailed political history of the NNC and treats Phizo's rise and the collapse of negotiations with careful empirical attention. Pieter Steyn's Zapuphizo: Voice of the Nagas is the most substantial full-length biography, drawing on a wide range of primary sources and providing extensive detail on Phizo's personal as well as political life. Historian Lydia Walker's States-in-Waiting: A Counternarrative of Global Decolonization situates the Naga independence claim within the wider history of postcolonial self-determination politics and provides a rich account of the international advocacy network through which Phizo operated in London. Geographer Alex Manby offers the most recent scholarly analysis, examining the geopolitical thought and spatial imagination that underpinned Phizo's vision of Naga statehood and arguing that the international scale of political activity was central to the construction of Naga postcolonial nationhood.

The assassination of T. Sakhrie remains the most morally contested aspect of Phizo's record. No serious scholar of the Naga conflict disputes that Phizo authorised or at minimum tacitly condoned the killing; the disagreement is over how it should be weighed against the rest of his political career and the context of an escalating armed conflict in which extrajudicial violence was being committed by all sides. Similarly, the question of whether Phizo's three-decade absence from Nagaland was a necessary act of diplomatic strategy or a form of personal abandonment of the people he claimed to represent has never been fully resolved, though Jwane Phizo's observation that her husband's London presence moderated Indian military conduct in Nagaland offers some support for the strategic interpretation.

What is not in dispute is that Phizo created the political vocabulary, the organisational structures, and the international profile that made the Naga independence movement a durable and historically significant phenomenon, and that his name and image continue to define the aspirational horizon of Naga nationalism well into the 21st century.

== Works ==
- A. Z. Phizo. The Fate of the Naga People: An Appeal to the World. London: self-published, 1960.

== Sources ==
- Manby, Alex (2026). "Geographies of Naga (Inter)Nationalism: The Subaltern Geopolitics of Angami Zapu Phizo". Global Studies Quarterly. 6 (2) ksag029. doi:10.1093/isagsq/ksag029.
- Steyn, Pieter. Zapuphizo: Voice of the Nagas. Routledge, 2002. ISBN 978-0-7103-0506-0.
- Guha, Ramachandra. India After Gandhi. Pan Macmillan, 2017. ISBN 9789382616979.
- Chaube, Shibani Kinkar (1999) [1973]. Hill Politics in Northeast India. Orient Longman. ISBN 81-250-1695-3 – via archive.org.
- Choudhury, Samrat (2023), Northeast India: A Political History, Hurst, ISBN 9781787389526
- Walker, Lydia, States-in-Waiting: A Counternarrative of Global Decolonization. Cambridge University Press, 2024. ISBN 978-1-009-30581-5.
- Haksar, Nandita, and Sebastian M. Hongray. Kuknalim: Naga Armed Resistance. Speaking Tiger, 2019. ISBN 9789388874915.
- Wouters, Jelle J. P. In the Shadows of Naga Insurgency: Tribes, State, and Violence in India's Northeast. Oxford University Press, 2018. ISBN 9780199485703.
- Frank, Simon. "A Nation at the Limits of State: The Colonial Heritage and International Reach of Naga Nationalism, 1945-1975." Tokyo University of Foreign Studies. https://www.tufs.ac.jp/documents/collaboration/CAAS/19_Frank.pdf.
