= Manohar Lal Kampani =

Indian Administrator (1925–2021)

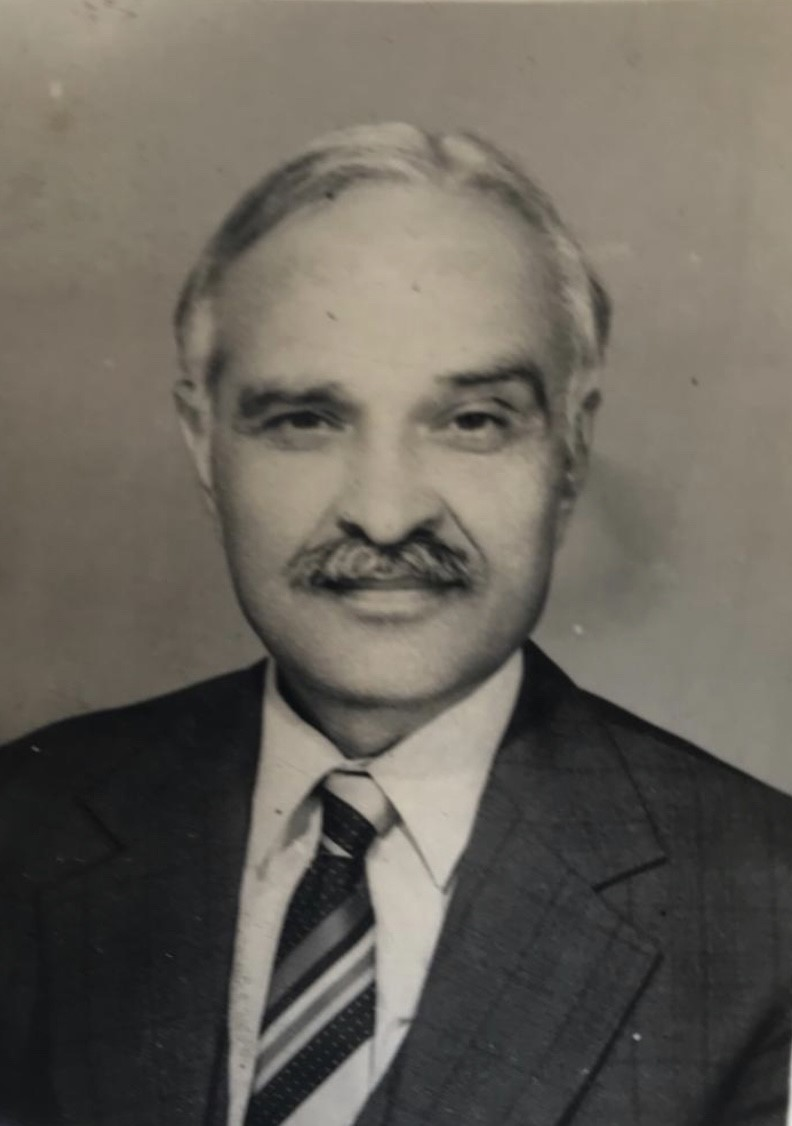
- Born: 17 January 1925
- Died: 22 April 2021 (aged 96); New Delhi India
- Education: Defence Services Staff College
- Known for: First lieutenant governor, Andaman and Nicobar Islands
- Notable work: Shillong accord 1975, Andaman Trunk Road
- Title: Lieutenant Governor Andaman and Nicobar Islands
- Term: 1982-85
- Successor: Lt Gen T S Oberoi
- Spouse: Smt Sita Kampani

Manohar Lal Kampani was the first lieutenant governor of Andaman and Nicobar Islands. He served from 12 November 1982 to 3 December 1985.

== Early life ==
He was born in a town named Gujrat of pre-partitioned Punjab to Nathuram Kampani and Vidyawanti Kampani.

== Career ==
He started his career as Commissioned Army officer where he was mentioned in despatches and also attended the Defence Services Staff College, Wellington. Later he joined the Administrative services.

As an officer of Administrative service he served as Deputy Commissioner in Kohima and Imphal, Development Commissioner of Sikkim, Chief Commissioner of Manipur and Chief Secretary of Arunachal Pradesh in a distinguished career.

In the Central assignments, he served as Joint Secretary and then as Additional Secretary in Home Ministry of India. He was the home Ministry expert in affairs of the North-East India. He played significant role in various Accords and talks in North-East including Nagaland, Mizoram and Assam during his tenure.

== Shillong Accord 1975 ==
As Joint Secretary in Home Ministry he was instrumental in drafting the Shillong Accord of 1975 with Nagaland Peace Council and Nagaland underground.

The Indian government was represented by Lallan Prasad Singh, Governor of Nagaland. The governor was assisted by M L Kampani, who as Joint Secretary in the Ministry of Home Affairs (MHA), was the Home ministry's point man for North -East and by two advisors for Nagaland— Moorkoth Ramunni and H. Zopianga. This historic agreement was signed at Shillong, Meghalaya, on 11 November 1975.

== Mizo Accord 1976 ==
He played a key role in signing of Mizo Accord in February 1976. The Mizo leader Mr Laldenga and his team of Mizo National Front (MNF)held discussions with Home Secretary Mr Sundar Lal Khurana, Lt Governor of Mizoram Mr S K Chibber and Mr M L Kampani, Joint Secretary in Ministry of Home representing Government of India in February 1976. The main terms of the Accord were signed on 18 Feb 1976.

== Lieutenant governor ==
In 1982 he became the first Lieutenant Governor succeeding S. L. Sharma who was last Chief Commissioner of Andaman and Nicobar Islands.

He was instrumental in many early developmental projects in Andaman and Nicobar Islands including Andaman Trunk Road.

== Other ==
He was part of the Home Ministry team which was with the then Prime Minister Morarji Desai when the aircraft was involved in a mishap at Jorhat on 4 November 1977.

== Later life ==
He was active with Charitable trusts and corporate entities in later life. A keen sportsman he played tennis well into his 80s.

He shared his experience with many writers and journalists on his time in North-East India.

He died on 22 April 2021, in New Delhi, at age of 96.

== See also ==
- Shillong Accord of 1975
- List of lieutenant governors of the Andaman and Nicobar Islands
