= NNC =

NNC can stand for:

- Naga National Council, a predecessor of the Nationalist Socialist Council of Nagaland (NSCN)
- Natal Native Contingent, British auxiliary soldiers in South Africa around late 19th century
- National Negro Congress, coalition that worked to advance African American civil and labor rights
- National Numismatic Collection, a part of the National Museum of American History
- National Nutrition Council (Philippines)
- Nepal Nursing Council
- North Northamptonshire Council, England
- Northwest Nazarene College, now called Northwest Nazarene University, Idaho, United States
- Norwegian Nobel Committee
