= United National Liberation Front of Western South East Asia =

United front of armed separatist groups in India

United Liberation Front of Western South East Asia
- Dates active: 24 April 2015–present
- Active regions: Northeast India and West Bengal
- Wars: the insurgency in Northeast India

The United National Liberation Front of Western South East Asia/WESEA (UNLFW) is a united front of armed separatist groups in India formed by the United Liberation Front of Asom (ULFA), the National Socialist Council of Nagaland (NSCN-K), the Kamtapur Liberation Organisation (KLO), and the National Democratic Front of Boroland (NDFB). It claimed responsibility for the 2015 Manipur ambush, an ambush of eighteen Indian soldiers in Manipur in June 2015. The ambush was one of the deadliest attacks against Indian security forces in over thirty years.

The UNLFW was established in April 2015, when leaders of the ULFA, NDFB (Songbijit), KLO and Khaplang of the NSCN-K assembled in Taga in Nanyun Township, Myanmar and agreed to work together in "united and total struggle" against the Indian establishment. S. S. Khaplang was chosen as the chairman.

After Khaplang's death in June 2017, the organization's future was uncertain for several months. In October 2017 the head of NSCN-K, Khango Konyak, became UNLFW chairman, winning out over Paresh Baruah of ULFA.

== See also ==
- Insurgency in Northeast India
- Myanmar conflict
- Insurgency in Jammu and Kashmir
- List of ethnic armed organisations in Myanmar
