= 2015 Manipur ambush =

Insurgent attack in Northeast India

Manipur ambush
- Part of the insurgency in Northeast India
Date	4 June 2015
Location	Chandel district, Manipur

Belligerents
India	United Liberation Front of Western South East Asia (UNLFW)

Units involved
Indian Army: Dogra Regiment	National Socialist Council of Nagaland-K (NSCN-K); Kanglei Yawol Kanna Lup; Kangleipak Communist Party (Noyon faction)

Casualties and losses
20 killed 31 wounded	None

On 4 June 2015, United Liberation Front of Western South East Asia (UNLFW) separatists ambushed a military convoy in Chandel district of Manipur, India, resulting in the death of twenty Indian Army soldiers. Fifteen soldiers also suffered serious injury. The United Liberation Front, a separatist group operating in North-East India, publicly claimed responsibility for the deadly attack.

In response to the UNLFW attack on Indian troops, Indian military successfully carried out a cross-border operation into Myanmar on militant camps, named Operation Hot Pursuit . Indian officials and media sources confirmed that the cross border operation resulted in the death of 158 millitants belonging to NSCN-K who were believed to be responsible for the attack on Indian armed forces in Manipur.

However the Myanmar government rejected Indian claims and stated that the Indian military operation against millitants took place entirely on the Indian side of the border and Indian troops did not cross Myanmar's border however confirmed that indian army had conducted an operation against millitants.

According to the NSCN-K, Indian troops attacked 2 camps belonging to the NSCN-K and NSCN-IM.
