= Isak Chishi Swu =

Indian militant and political leader (1929–2016)

1st Chairman of National Socialist Council of Nagaland-IM
- In office 30 April 1988 – 28 June 2016 (death)
- Preceded by: Office created
- Succeeded by: Qhehezu Tuccu

1st Chairman of National Socialist Council of Nagaland
- In office 31 January 1980 – 30 April 1988
- Preceded by: office created

1st Foreign Secretary of Federal Government of Nagaland
- In office 1 March 1959 – 1966
- Preceded by: office created

Personal details
- Born: 11 November 1929 Chishilimi village, Zunheboto District, Nagaland, India
- Died: 28 June 2016 (aged 86) New Delhi, India
- Spouse: Eustar (Khulu) Chishi Swu
- Parent: Kushe Chishi Swu

Isak Chishi Swu (11 November 1929 – 28 June 2016) was the chairman of the Nationalist Socialist Council of Nagaland (NSCN). He along with Thuingaleng Muivah and S. S. Khaplang were instrumental in the creation of NSCN on 31 January 1980 after opposing the Shillong Accord signed by the then Naga National Council (NNC) with the Indian government. He was unable to attend the historic Naga Peace Accord signed on 4 August 2015 due to health conditions.

== Early life ==
Isak Chishi Swu was born in 1929 at Chishilimi village in the erstwhile Naga Hills District (now Zunheboto district of Nagaland). His father, Kushe Chishi Swu, was the first Christian and evangelist from the Sümi Naga Tribe.

He did his early education at American Mission School at Chishilimi then studied at Government High School, Kohima and graduated with Honours in Political Science from St. Anthony's College, Shillong.

== Naga Movement ==
Isak Chishi Swu joined the NNC in 1958 and served as the Foreign Secretary of the outfit. Under the leadership of Angami Zapu Phizo, the NNC unsuccessfully campaigned for the secession of the Naga territory from India and creation of a sovereign Naga state. After he became the foreign secretary he was later elevated to Vice President of NNC.

== The Split ==
Isak Chishi Swu was opposed to the signing of the Shillong Accord by the then Naga National Council (NNC) with the Government of India. Following a disagreement, he along with Thuingaleng Muivah and SS Khaplang split NNC into a new faction, called the Nationalist Socialist Council of Nagaland (NSCN). It was later split again when SS Khaplang decided to part ways and created his own faction called NSCN (K) due to clan rivalries among the Konyak people of Nagaland and the Tangkhul Naga of Manipur.

== Naga Peace Talk ==
Swu, Muivah and other top NSCN (IM) leaders escaped to Thailand in the early 1990s after a crackdown by the government of India. However, after getting a positive response for peace talk through intermediary MM Thomas, the then Governor of Nagaland, the government and NSCN started the peace talks. Later Prime Minister of India P V Narasimha Rao met Muivah, Swu and others in Paris on 15 June 1995. In November 1995, then MoS (Home Affairs) Rajesh Pilot met them in Bangkok. Subsequently, Prime Minister H. D. Deve Gowda met them in Zurich on 3 February 1997, which was followed by meetings with officers in Geneva and Bangkok. Prime Minister Atal Bihari Vajpayee met them in Paris on 30 September 1998. The Government of India signed a ceasefire agreement with NSCN (IM) on 25 July 1997, which came into effect on 1 August 1997. Over 80 rounds of talks between the two sides were held subsequently.

== Death ==
After undergoing treatment for almost a year at a private hospital in South Delhi, Swu died on 28 June 2016. He was 86.
