= National Socialist Council of Nagaland =

Naga militant separatist group of Northeast India

- Flag of Nagaland, adopted by the NSCN
- Founders: Isak Chishi Swu # S. S. Khaplang # Thuingaleng Muivah
- Leaders: Thuingaleng Muivah (NSCN-IM); Yung Aung (NSCN-K)
- Dates active: 31 January 1980 – present
- Allegiance: United National Liberation Front of Western South East Asia (NSCN-K)
- Headquarters: Camp Hebron, Peren District, Nagaland
- Active regions: Nagaland, India; Manipur, India; Assam, India; Arunachal Pradesh, India; Sagaing Region, Myanmar
- Ideology: Naga nationalism Communism; Separatism
- Political position: Far-left
- Size: ~5,000 (NSCN-IM) <500 (NSCN-K); 1,000+ (NSCN-U); ~2,500 (NSCN-R)
- Wars: Insurgency in Northeast India

The National Socialist Council of Nagaland (NSCN) is a Naga Christian Maoist separatist group operating mainly in northeastern part of India, with minor activities in northwest Myanmar. The main aim of the organisation is reportedly to establish the country of Nagalim, a sovereign Naga state, which would consist of all the areas inhabited by Naga tribes in Northeast India and northwest Myanmar. The group's name is derived from their belief in the goal of a sovereign Naga state, combined with their belief in socialism. India claims that China and Pakistan provide financial support and weaponry to the NSCN.

There are two major factions of the NSCN, NSCN-K, which was led by S. S. Khaplang, and NSCN-IM, which was led by Isak Chishi Swu and Thuingaleng Muivah. Smaller factions comprise the rest of the NSCN. In 2015, in response to an attack on an army convoy in Manipur, India designated the NSCN-K as a terrorist organization under the Unlawful Activities (Prevention) Act. India's Ministry of Home Affairs labels NSCN a major insurgent group.

== History ==
The word "Naga" is used as a collective term for several ethnic tribes living on the Himalayan Range in Northeast India, which were brought under the control of British India during the 19th century. After India's independence, several Naga leaders tried to secede from India. In 1975, the separatist Naga National Council (NNC) renounced violence and signed the Shillong Accord with the Government of India. Some of the NNC leaders disapproved of this peace treaty: these leaders included Isak Chishi Swu of the Sumi (Sema) tribe, Thuingaleng Muivah of the Tangkhul tribe, and S. S. Khaplang. These leaders broke off from the NNC and formed the National Socialist Council of Nagaland (NSCN) as a new separatist organisation.

NSCN formed an underground Naga Federal Government having both civil and military wings, the Government of the People's Republic of Nagalim (GPRN), and the Naga Army. Later, a disagreement surfaced within the group's leaders over the issue of commencing dialogue with the Indian government

On 30 April 1988, the NSCN split into two factions; the NSCN-K led by Khaplang, and the NSCN-IM, led by Chishi Swu and Muivah. The split was accompanied by a spate of violence and clashes between the factions. In 1997, ceasefire agreements were made between the factions of the NSCN and India. Later, NSCN-K abrogated the ceasefire agreement.

On 6 April 2015, a new faction of the NSCN was formed. Y. Wangtin Konyak and P. Tikhak officially announced the formation of a new Naga political group going by the name "National Socialist Council of Nagaland (Reformation)" or NSCN-R. The decision came after Konyak, a senior minister, or Kilonser, of the NSCN-K and a personal secretary to founder Khaplang was expelled from the group after disagreements over its ceasefire agreement. The NSCN-R, wanted to continue with the ceasefire maintaining that "violence has never served a good purpose and the Naga political problem can only be resolved through peace and negotiation" while Khaplang had it abrogated because the "14 years of ceasefire between NSCN-K and India has become a mockery and futile exercise." Opposed to militant activities, the primary agenda of the NSCN-R would be to "develop a sense of brotherhood among the Naga family and to rebuild the trust and faith among the Naga society."

On 3 August 2015, NSCN-IM leaders Isak Swu and T. Muivah signed a framework agreement for peace with the Government of India in the presence of Prime Minister Narendra Modi, Home Minister Rajnath Singh, and National Security Advisor Ajit Doval. Also in 2015, NSCN-K became affiliated with a militia organization named the United Liberation Front of Western South East Asia (UNLFW), a united front of Northeast Indian militant groups, and shortly after broke off peace talks with the Indian government. The UNLFW carried out the 2015 Manipur ambush, in which 18 Indian soldiers were killed and 15 were wounded.

== Factions ==
The NSCN militants group itself was formed when it broke away from Naga National Council (NNC) in 1980 led by leaders Isak Chishi Swu, Thuingaleng Muivah and S. S. Khaplang. The first split occurred in 1988 when the group was split into two factions, NSCN-IM led by Isak Chishi Swu, Thuingaleng Muivah and NSCN-K led by Khaplang, the split occurred due to ideological and tribal clashes within the group.

=== NSCN-IM ===
One of the main Faction led by Isak Chishi Swu and Thuingaleng Muivah. In cesefire with Indian government since 1997. This faction again had some breakaway factions:

- NSCN-KK/NSCN (Khole-Kitovi) – The group broke away from NSCN-IM in 2011 led by Khole Konyak who is a senior leader and Kitovi Zhimomi who was the General Secretary of NSCN-IM at that time, they citing Muivah's autocratic style for the reason of the split. The group is in Ceasefire with Indian government.
- NSCN-U/ NSCN (Unification) – It is a small faction that broke away in 2007 wanting the unification of NCSN-K and NSCN-IM.

=== NSCN-K ===
A major faction of the group led by Khaplang, but also experienced significant faction breakdown since his death in 2017. The group is in ceasefire with Indian government since 2015.

- NSCN-KN/NSCN-K (Khango) – In 2018, a faction led by Khango Konyak broke away from the NSCN-K after he was removed as the Chairman. The group is in ceasefire with Indian government since 2019.
- NSCN-K-YA/NSCN-K (Aung Yung) – After the death of Khaplang in 2017 his nephew Aung Yung challenged then NSCN-K chairman Khango and broke away a faction mostly based in Myanmar. The group is the only one faction not in ceasefire with Indian government.
- NSCN-K-NS/NSCN-K (Niki Sumi) – In 2020, a prominent military commander of NSCN-KN faction broke away to create his own faction. The group is in ceasefire with Indian government since 2021.
- NSCN-R – Broke away in 2016 led by Y. Wangtin Konyak and P.Tikhak. The group is in ceasefire with Indian government.

== Objectives and aims ==
The founding objective of the NSCN was to establish a separate Naga State (Nagalim) by unifying all the Naga-inhabited areas in the North East of India and Northern Burma. The Nagas are divided into various ethnic groups whose numbers and populations are unclear. They each speak distinct languages, often unintelligible to the others. Unification of all Naga tribes under one administration and the secession of Naga populated areas from India through militant means was listed as one of the main objectives of the organisation. The organisation's manifesto states that it "stands for socialism." On political institution, it believes in "the dictatorship of the people through the National Socialist Council and the practice of democracy within the organisation".

The NSCN has been considered as both a Maoist and Christian group. However, in an interview with the BBC in 2005, when asked about the slogan "Nagaland for Christ" and whether the Naga State would be a theocratic state, group leader Thuingaleng Muviah clarified that there had been a misunderstanding and that the slogan was not a law but rather was an aspiration of the group as more than 95% of Naga people are Christians. Muviah stated, "[the] Naga State has to be secular, if it is not secular then we would be betraying ourselves."

NSCN-IM, though it has signed a peace agreement with the Government of India, claims to uphold the founding objectives of the NSCM, with the integration of all the contiguous Naga areas under one administration being its prime goal. NSCN-K continues to engage in militant insurgency with its goal being the separation of Naga populated areas from the Indian Union.

Some consider NSCN to be a Christian nationalist terrorist group. The leader, Thuingaleng Muivah has said that the Naga state would be secular. Muviah stated, "[the] Naga State has to be secular, if it is not secular then we would be betraying ourselves."

== Area of operation ==
The NSCN is active in northeastern part of India, with the group having its strongest influence and presence in the state of Nagaland and the hill districts of Manipur. It additionally maintains presences in Nagaland's neighbouring states of Assam and Arunachal Pradesh. Outside of India, the NSCN has operated in the Naga-inhabited regions of northern Myanmar.

== Leadership and structure ==
Isak Chishi Swu and Thuingaleng Muivah, the founders of NSCN-IM, served as the inaugural Chairman and General Secretary of the group, respectively, and S. S. Khaplang served the Chairman of NSCN-K. In February 2019, Qhehezu Tuccu was unanimously elected as the Chairman of the NSCN-IM. The post had been vacant since the death of Chishi Swu. At the same meeting, Tongmeth Wangnao was elected as the vice-chairman of the NSCN-IM.

Politically, the NSCN has divided its area of influence into 11 administrative regions based on sub-tribe considerations and administrative convenience. In many areas, it runs a parallel government in opposition to the recognized Indian government. There are four major NSCN Ministries – Defence, Home, Finance, and Foreign Affairs. Moreover, there are five other minor Ministries including Education, Information and Publicity, Forests and Minerals, Law and Justice, and Religious Affairs. The most prominent among the group's nine Ministries is its "Home Ministry", which it considers to be "a replacement of the Indian state machinery". The heads of 11 administrative regions report to the head of this Home Ministry, referred to by the group as the "Kilo Kilonser". The devolution of the administrative arms of the organisation goes down to the town and village levels.

The group has also established a government-in-exile called the Government of the People's Republic of Nagalim (GPRN), which interacts with formal and non-formal world bodies and media. The GPRN has sent emissaries abroad, mainly to countries that have unfriendly relations with India, to garner support and raise funds for their cause.

== Linkages ==
Over the years, the NSCN has developed extensive linkages both within and outside India.

The NSCN has patronised smaller militant groups in Northeast India, training the groups in warfare and intelligence methods and providing them with logistics for waging war against India. The group has connections to India's Naxalite–Maoist militant groups and is a member of the UNLFW militant group united front.

The group has opened up contacts with international organizations like the United Nations Human Rights Council and the Working Group on Indigenous Populations. It is additionally a member of the Unrepresented Nations and Peoples Organization.

It is alleged by the Indian government that China and Pakistan provide financial support and weaponry to the NSCN. Knowledge of China's role in the Naga insurgency was expanded after the 2019 arrest of NSCN-IM leader Anthony Shimray. After his arrest, Shimray alleged that he was tasked by Chinese intelligence agencies to gather intelligence on Indian troop deployments in northeastern India. On 7 July 2019, the Indian Army busted an NSCN spy camp in Kekru Naga village. An additional four camps were targeted by Indian security forces.

== Sources of funding ==
According to the Indian Army, drug trafficking and extortion are the major sources of income for the NSCN. The group retains 70% of the income it generates while the remaining 30% is distributed to smaller ethnic insurgent groups operating in NSCN areas.

The NSCN takes a 12% tax from the government employees living in NSCN areas and collects a fixed house tax from local population. For shops and commercial establishments operating in NSCN areas, the tax rate starts at a minimum of 5%. This is considered "extortion" by some authorities.

== Activities ==
On 4 June 2015, NSCN-K and Kanglei Yawol Kanna Lup ambushed an Indian Army convoy, killing 18 soldiers. On 10 June, India claimed that, in response to the ambush, it had conducted strikes against NSCN-K camps inside Myanmar, and inflicted significant casualties. Indian media reported that around 38 militants belonging to NSCN-K were killed in the strikes. The Myanmar government, however, rejected Indian government claims. According to Myanmar government officials, the operation against NSCN insurgents took place entirely on the Indian side of the border and Indian troops did not cross into Myanmar. NSCN-K also rejected India's claims. According to NSCN-K, Indian troops did not attack any camp belonging to NSCN-K and the group did not suffer any losses. NSCN-K also challenged the Indian Army to display the dead bodies of those killed during the operation.

On 9 June 2017, Khaplang died of illness in Kachin State, Myanmar, and Kham Ngaw became the acting chairman of NSCN-K. In August 2018, Khaplang's nephew Yung Aung drove out the interim acting chairman Kham Ngaw and became the leader of NSCN-K. During Yung Aung's tenure, NSCN-K split several times, and commanders Niki Sumi and Ang Mai successively led their people to leave the group and form new factions.

In February and June 2019, the Indian Army and the Myanmar's Tatmadaw carried out joint operations Sunrise and Sunrise II, cooperating to target several militant groups along the Indo-Burma border including the Kamtapur Liberation Organisation, the United Liberation Front of Assam (I), the National Democratic Front of Boroland, and NSCN-K. In February, Burmese troops stormed the NSCN-K headquarters in Taga. The Indian Army reciprocated by starting a major operation against the Arakan Army in south Mizoram.

On 21 May 2019, 11 people including the National People's Party member of the Legislative Assembly Tirong Aboh and his son, were killed in an ambush by militants on Khonsa-Deomali road in Tirap District. In response to the ambush, the Indian Army launched various operations against the NSCN-IM, which resulted in the confiscation of NSCN-IM weapons and the detention of five suspected members of the group.

In mid-July 2019, NSCN-IM militants opposed the implementation of the Register of Indigenous Inhabitants of Nagaland (RIIN); the group alleges that the push to implement the RIIN is "contradictory" to the inherent rights of the Naga people.

== Controversies ==
In 2015, The Economist, a British newspaper, claimed that the NSCN-K had previously been backed by India's intelligence agencies to divide other Naga separatist groups and weaken the Naga insurgency.

NSCN-IM has been accused of killing innocent people, including Nagas, who speak against their aims or ideology. In September 2021, Athuan Abonmai, a Zeliangrong man from Grace Colony, was kidnapped and killed by NSCN-IM members.

Security and government forces have accused NSCN-K and related factions of extortion, kidnappings and procurement of arms. In 2025, the Government of India banned NSCN-K for 5 years under the Unlawful Activities (Prevention) Act.

In 2025, two NSCN's linkmen were charged with extorting money from businessmen in Namtola.

== See also ==
- Insurgency in Northeast India
- Separatist movements of India
