= Saijang, Peren =

Saijang
- village
- Location Nagaland, India Saijang (India)
- Coordinates: 25.576914°N 93.641300°E
- Country: India
- State: Nagaland
- District: Peren
- Circle: Athibung

Population (2011)
  - Total: 2,253
- Time zone: UTC+5:30 (IST)
- Census code: 268330

Saijang is a village in the Peren district of Nagaland, India. It is located in the Athibung Circle.

== Demographics ==
According to the 2011 census of India, Saijang has 392 households. The effective literacy rate (i.e. the literacy rate of population excluding children aged 6 and below) is 96.17%.

Demographics (2011 Census)
	Total	Male	Female
Population	2253	1545	708
Children aged below 6 years	322	166	156
Scheduled caste	0	0	0
Scheduled tribe	1991	1373	618
Literates	1857	1361	496
Workers (all)	1650	1234	416
Main workers (total)	1390	1148	242
Main workers: Cultivators	308	112	196
Main workers: Agricultural labourers	5	3	2
Main workers: Household industry workers	3	1	2
Main workers: Other	1074	1032	42
Marginal workers (total)	260	86	174
Marginal workers: Cultivators	205	63	142
Marginal workers: Agricultural labourers	0	0	0
Marginal workers: Household industry workers	1	0	1
Marginal workers: Others	54	23	31
Non-workers	603	311	292
