= Naga National Council =

- Founded: 1946
- Preceded by: Naga Hills District Tribal Council, Naga Club
- Succeeded by: National Socialist Council of Nagaland
- Ideology: Naga nationalism, Separatism

The Naga National Council (NNC) was a political organization and a tribal government of Naga people in the erstwhile Naga Hills district of Assam (present-day Nagaland) in Northeast India. It was active from the late 1940s to the early 1950s. It evolved out of the Naga Hills District Tribal Council, an organization established in 1945 by the Deputy Commissioner of the Naga Hills district. The group was reorganized to form NNC in 1946 at Sanis (in present-day Wokha district), with T. Aliba Imti Ao as the President, and other democratically elected Naga representatives as its members. The organisation consisted of modernist educated elites, who were also officials of the government in various capacities. They were edged out by the hardline Naga leader Zapu Phizo towards the end of 1949, who then took over the organisation and turned it into a secessionist platform.

== Antecedents ==
In April 1945, the deputy commissioner of the Naga Hills District, C. R. Pawsey, established the Naga Hills District Tribal Council as a forum of the various Naga groups in the district. This body replaced an earlier organization called Naga Club, and in February 1946, it was reorganized as a political organization called Naga National Council (NNC). NNC's objective was to work out the terms of relationship with the Government of India after the British withdrawal.

== Organization ==
The president of the NNC was T. Aliba Imti Ao. He was the son of an Imtilepden of Lonjang village, he was the first teacher amongst the Nagas and also served as a pastor. Imti Ao was a graduate from St. Edmund's College, Shillong and had been the secretary of the Hills Students' Federation, an affiliate of the All India Students Federation (AISF). The joint secretary of the NNC was T. Sakhrie, an Angami.

NNC had two central councils, one each at Kohima and Mokokchung. Each central council was split into a number of tribal councils, which were further split into sub-tribal councils. Generally, a sub-tribal council was formed with five villages. Members were not elected, but chosen by the NNC leadership.

The Kohima Central Council consisted of 12 members, of whom seven belonged to the Angami tribe. It was presided over by a Liangmei school teacher of Kohima.

The Mokokchung Central Council had 15 members, of whom five were Ao, four Sema, three Lotha, two Sangtam, and one Chang. The Konyaks had not attended the first meeting of the council, and were not represented. There was no representation from the unadministered area.

== Demand for autonomy ==
In a memorandum presented to the British Government in June 1945, the NNC demanded an autonomous status for the Naga region.

When the report of the 1946 Cabinet Mission to India was published, NNC passed a resolution on 19 June 1946 at Wokha in Mokokchung division. It stated that it was against grouping of Assam in Bengal, and wanted the Naga Hills District to be included in an autonomous Assam in the independent India. It further emphasized local autonomy for the Naga Hills District, and a separate electorate for the Naga tribes.

In November 1946, Gopinath Bordoloi, the Premier of Assam visited the district. The Nagas respected the Assamese politicians like Gopinath Bordoloi and Bimala Prasad Chaliha, and showed cordiality to Bordoloi in November 1946.

In February 1947, the NNC council passed a resolution at Kohima. As a result of this resolution, on 20 February 1947, it submitted a proposal for interim Government of Nagas, under a "Guardian Power" for a period of ten years. They didn't explicitly state who the "Guardian Power" should be (Government of India, the Provincial Government or His Majesty's Government).

In June 1947, Indian Prime Minister Jawaharlal Nehru wrote to the Naga National Council (NNC) secretary, T. Sakhrie, saying that the Indian government is against the separate electorates, as they "limit and injure the small group by keeping it separated from rest of the nation."

=== Talks with the Bordoloi subcommittee ===
In 1947, the Bordoloi subcommittee of the Constituent Assembly (Note: This subcommittee was tasked with recommending measures for the administration of the tribal areas of Northeast India, in particular the "Excluded Areas" and "Partially Excluded Areas". Its members included the Khasi leader J. J. M. Nichols-Roy and Bodo leader Rupnath Brahma. The subcommittee eventually formulated the Sixth Schedule to the Constitution of India.) came to Kohima for discussions with the Naga leaders. The Kohima Central Council of NNC was reluctant to nominate a person for co-option to the Bordoloi subcommittee. The Bordoloi subcommittee was constituted with Mayangnokcha Ao as a member, but he did not accept the position. Hence, Aliba was taken in his place.

When the subcommittee reached Kohima, NNC did not have a permanent president. The committee had received a list of organizations to be interviewed from the deputy commissioner Pawsey, but Pawsey himself was away. Kevichüsa Angami, the senior extra assistant commissioner at Kohima, acted as the guardian angel of the NNC.

The secretary of the subcommittee observed:

On the whole, the attitude of the NNC and the general atmosphere seemed to have taken an unpleasant turn, since the (Assam) Premier's visit (in November 1946). It was clearly perceived that the Council was now dominated by certain Angami leaders like Kevichüsa and Lungalang and the more reasonable elements were prevented from asserting themselves

(a) on account of the Naga system of not deciding matters by a majority but by a general agreement only, and

(b) by the threat of force which seemed to hold the NNC together.

The non-Naga groups of Dimapur were also presented before the subcommittee, and spoke against the NNC. The subcommittee did not visit the other subdivision, Mokokchung. The Bordoloi report was vetoed by the Angami member, Kezehol, but accepted by the Sema member, Khetloushe. Khetloushe replaced Kezehol, when the latter resigned during the last meeting of the subcommittee. The Bordoloi subcommittee concluded that "many of them (Naga leaders) were inclined to take moderate views on the lines of the original resolution passed at Wokha, but in view of the intransigence of certain other members, probably of the Angami group, they were prevented from doing so."

=== Nine-Points Agreement ===
Aliba Imti continued to strive for a settlement between the Government and the NNC members. As a result of his efforts, on 26 June 1947, Sir Muhammad Saleh Akbar Hydari, the Governor of Assam, reached a Nine-Points Agreement with the Naga leaders. It was decided that the Nagas would be granted judicial, executive and legislative powers, as well as autonomy in land-related matters. There was a ten-year guarantee of these provisions at the end of which the Nagas could choose between extending the agreement or a new agreement. The Naga leaders were also promised unification of Naga territories from nearby districts into the Naga Hills District. However, the Constituent Assembly refused to ratify the Hydari accord. The Naga leaders envisaged a sovereign state with India as a "Guardian Power" for ten years, while the Indian Constituent Assembly concluded that the Nine Points Agreement guaranteed only a "district autonomy within the Indian Constitution".

== Rise of Phizo and the secessionist ideology ==
Until 1949, the hardline Naga leader Angami Zapu Phizo did not have an important role in NNC. He led a separate organisation called People's Independence League, working towards a demand of independence. He met the Assamese, Garos, Khasis, Lushais, Abors, Mishmis and Meiteis leaders in an attempt to convince them to form independent countries of their own, instead of joining the Union of India. However, his efforts failed.

In July 1947, as Phizo had set out to take a delegation to Delhi to meet national leaders, the Deputy Commissioner Pawsey sent a telegram, via Governor Hydari, stating that they represent an "unimportant minority" and that they should be ignored. Perhaps the telegram arrived too late, the delegation did meet Gandhi and stated their intention to declare independence. According to one version, Gandhi is said to have replied, "I feel that Naga Hills is mine just as it is yours. But if you say that it is not mine, the matter must stop there... If you do not wish to join the Union of India nobody will force you to that."

The NNC secretary T. Sakhrie had expressed fears in a letter to Gandhi that the Indian government might use military force to occupy the Naga territory by force. Gandhi assured the Naga delegation that he would go to Kohima, and he would be "the first to be shot before any Naga is killed".

=== Declaration of independence ===
On 14 August 1947, one day before India gained its independence, Phizo sent a telegram to United Nations and Delhi announcing his organisation's resolve to lead a free Naga nation. The telegram was intercepted by the district administration and never delivered. On 15 August, Phizo declared the independence of Nagaland. Scholar Shibani Chaube states that there is nothing to indicate that NNC as a party had anything to do with the declaration.

The hardliners led by Phizo gradually increased their influence over the NNC. Phizo became the 4th NNC president in October–November 1949 after defeating Vizar Angami of Zakhama village by a margin of one vote; the vote was held in the absence of most of the other leaders. Under his leadership, the NNC inclined towards seeking secession from India.

The Government of independent India continued the British policy of isolating the North-East. The Naga Hills District was placed in Part A tribal areas category, as an Autonomous District administered by the Government of Assam, with a limited representation in the Assam State Legislative Assembly and in the National Parliament. The Naga Tribal Area (Tuensang) was placed in the Part B tribal areas category, which was administered by the Governor of Assam acting as Agent of the President of India.

=== Plebiscite ===
In February 1950, the NNC declared that it would hold a referendum to decide the issue of Naga sovereignty. The Government of India condemned NNC as "the voice of the misguided", and rejected NNC's proposal. Nevertheless, NNC decided to conduct a plebiscite on 16 May 1951 and claimed that 99.9% of the Nagas wanted independence from India. Since it is not clear who actually participated in the plebiscite, the inflated percentage is doubtful. Several of the Naga people inhabited the territory outside the region in which NNC was active. Also, the bulk of the educated Naga people worked outside the region, and the Indian Government had banned its employees from participating in the plebiscite. The Indian Government and the Government of Assam rejected the result.

Phizo met Nehru in December 1951 near Tezpur in Assam, in March 1952 at Delhi, and in July 1952 at Dibrugarh. He was arrested in Burma for illegal entry.

The first Indian general elections were held in 1952, which were boycotted by the separatist leaders. The NNC vice-president, Imkongmeren Ao, submitted a memorandum to Nehru on 18 October 1952, complaining against killing of a Naga, and reminding him of Nagas' desire for independence.

In 1953, a meeting was organized between the Indian Prime Minister Jawaharlal Nehru and the Burmese Prime Minister U Nu, to decide on borders between India and Burma. The separatist leaders termed the meeting as the process of dividing Naga territory between the two countries. Nehru and U Nu visited the Naga areas in India and Burma. On 30 March 1953, when they visited Kohima, the deputy commissioner of the district disallowed the NNC delegation from meeting Nehru, apparently without Nehru's knowledge. Consequently, Nehru's public meeting was boycotted by NNC and its sympathizers.

After NNC's decision to boycott the Government of India, many posters and letters threatening Government employees (especially the Nagas) appeared. As a result, the Government launched a widespread police action against the NNC. On 4 April 1953, the police raided the house of T. Sakhrie. On 7 April, guns were seized from several villages in raids. On 3 May, the Assam police and the Assam Rifles launched a massive raid on Khonoma, the village of Phizo. On 26 May 1953, the Assam Maintenance of Public Order (Autonomous Districts) was enacted and on 14 July, it was applied in the Naga Hills District.

On 12 August 1953, the Naga tribal councils and the tribal courts were dissolved. A few days later, the Kohima Government School was temporarily closed after 19 students boycotted the Indian Independence Day celebrations on 15 August, and threatened to assault the teachers and students who joined the celebrations.

Some days later, a goodwill mission of APCC led by its President Bimala Prasada Chaliha visited Naga Hills District. It was followed by another goodwill mission of the Assam Unit of the Praja Socialist Party (PSP), led by its president, Hareswar Goswami. In return, Naga Goodwill mission led by Phizo's niece Rano M. Iralu (the President of Naga Women's Federation) visited Assam from 30 November to 15 December 1953.

=== Decline ===
In September 1954, Phizo formed the "People's Sovereign Republic of Free Nagaland", with the support of Chang chiefs of Tuensang. He reorganized the NNC setup, as the chances of a peaceful settlement declined. In 1955, the Angami leaders T. Sakhrie (who had served the secretary of NNC since its inception) and Zasokie broke off with Phizo at a meeting in the Khonoma village. Phizo got Sakhrie murdered in January 1956. Other leaders who dissented with Phizo, such as Jasokie and Silie, had to ask for refuge from the Indian Government. Thus, the NNC virtually collapsed.

In January 1956, the Naga Hills District was declared a "Disturbed Area", putting it under the Indian Army's command. On 22 March 1956 Phizo formed the "Naga Central Government", which was later renamed to "Federal Government of Nagaland" (FGN) in 1959. The new organization had a military wing to encounter the Indian soldiers, who were accused of human rights violations by the separatists. Phizo escaped to East Pakistan in December 1956, from where he went to London.

The secessionist movement declined to a great extent after the formation of Nagaland as a new state of India in 1963, with the Naga leader P. Shilu Ao as its chief minister. Several Naga rebel groups continued the insurgency, but the scale of violence decreased considerably. On 11 November 1975, a 6-member delegation, which included Phizo's brother Kevi Yallay, signed the Shillong Peace Accord with the Government of India.

NNC's Vice President Isak Chishi Swu and General Secretary Thuingaleng Muivah denounced the Shillong Peace Accord, calling it a "complete sellout of the Naga rights". On 21 November 1975, they were joined by Lorho, Venuh, Moire and Pamrei, who jointly condemned the Accord, dubbing its supporters as traitors. However, on 2 December, the FGN endorsed the Accord at a meeting held at Dihoma. Both the factions sought Phizo's views. But Phizo, who was in London, neither endorsed nor condemned the Accord.

Subsequently, in 1980, a faction led by Isak, Muivah and SS Khaplang broke away from NNC to form the National Socialist Council of Nagaland (NSCN), which continued the secessionist activities.

== Bibliography ==
- Chaube, Shibani Kinkar (1999) [1973]. Hill Politics in Northeast India. Orient Longman. ISBN 81-250-1695-3 – via archive.org.
- Choudhury, Samrat (2023), Northeast India: A Political History, Hurst, ISBN 9781787389526
