= Thuingaleng Muivah =

Naga nationalist militant leader (born 1934)

- Born: 3 March 1934 (age 92); Somdal (Shongran), Manipur, British India
- Occupation: General Secretary of the NSCN(I-M)
- Organization(s): 1964–1980 NNC; 1980–1988 undivided NSCN; 1988–present NSCN(I-M)
- Spouse: Pakahao Muivah
- Parent(s): Shangkathan Muivah, Luimala Muivah

Thuingaleng Muivah (born 3 March 1934) is a Naga nationalist militant leader and General Secretary of the National Socialist Council of Nagaland (I-M).

== Early career ==
He joined the Naga National Council (NNC), an armed group campaigning for secession of Nagaland from India. He subsequently became the General Secretary of NNC. When a group of NNC leaders signed the Shillong Accord of 1975 with the Government of India, Muviah and some others denounced them as traitors.

== NNC to NSCN ==
In 1980, a faction led by Isak Chishi Swu, S. S. Khaplang and Muivah broke away from NNC to form the National Socialist Council of Nagalim (NSCN). The NSCN was formed as a result of discontentment with the Shillong Accord, and continued secessionist activities abandoned by the NNC. The group later split into NSCN(I-M) led by Swu and Muivah, and NSCN (K) led by Khaplang due to major disagreements.

== Peace talks ==
NSCN (I-M) under the leadership of Muivah and Isak Chishi Swu signed a ceasefire agreement with the Government of India in August 1997 after decades of engaging in hostile fighting with Indian security forces. The major breakthrough of the peace talk happened on 3 August 2015 with the signing of a peace accord between Muivah-led NSCN(I-M) and the Narendra Modi-led Indian Government.

In 2010, the Manipur state government barred Muivah from returning to his native Ukhrul District, which he had not visited since 1973, triggering large-scale deadly protests. He was finally allowed to return in 2025.

== Factional conflict and controversies ==
Following the split of the National Socialist Council of Nagalim (NSCN) in 1988, relations between the NSCN (I-M) and NSCN (K) factions were marked by prolonged armed confrontation. The rivalry resulted in numerous inter-factional clashes, causing casualties among members of both organisations as well as civilians, and has been identified by scholars as a significant obstacle to the Naga peace process.

As General Secretary of the NSCN (I-M), Muivah remained one of the organisation's principal political leaders during this period. The NSCN (I-M) has faced allegations from Indian investigative agencies regarding extortion through the collection of illegal "taxes" and other insurgency-related activities, leading to investigations by agencies including the Enforcement Directorate.

The NSCN (I-M) has maintained that it represents the political aspirations of the Naga people and has consistently described its movement as one seeking Naga self-determination through a negotiated political settlement.

== Silence on Structural Constraints ==
Several analysts have noted that the areas claimed as part of Nagalim face significant economic and administrative challenges. The economies of Nagaland and Manipur remain heavily dependent on fiscal transfers from the Government of India. According to the PRS Legislative Research analysis of the 2026–27 state budgets, approximately 86% of Nagaland's revenue receipts and 88% of Manipur's revenue receipts are expected to come from central taxes and grants.

Scholars have also identified the region's mountainous terrain, limited transport infrastructure, dispersed settlements and relatively low levels of industrialisation as constraints on economic development. These factors have been cited as challenges for attracting large-scale private investment and establishing independent fiscal and administrative institutions.

Supporters of the proposal argue that greater political autonomy would enable Naga communities to exercise greater control over local resources and development priorities. Critics contend that the proposed territory's distribution across multiple Indian states and Myanmar would present significant administrative and economic challenges.
