= Shillong Accord =

1975 agreement between India and Nagaland

Shillong Accord of 1975
- Signed: 11 November 1975
- Location: Shillong
- Signatories: Lallan Prasad Singh I. Temjenba; S. Dahru; Veenyiyl Rhakhu; Z. Ramyo; M. Assa Kevi Yallay
- Parties: India; Representatives of Naga National Council
- Language: English

The Shillong Accord was an agreement signed between the Government of India and representatives of Nagaland's underground organisations in 1975. The agreement was signed at Shillong, Meghalaya, on 11 November 1975.

The terms to which the underground organisations agreed included: acceptance of the supremacy of Constitution of India without condition, surrendering of their arms, and a renouncing of their previous demand for the secession of Nagaland from India.

== Representatives ==
- The Indian government was represented by Lallan Prasad Singh, Governor of Nagaland. The governor was assisted by Manohar Lal Kampani, Joint Secretary in the Ministry of Home Affairs (MHA), and by two advisors for Nagaland, Moorkoth Ramunni, and H. Zopianga.
- The Nagaland's underground organisations were represented by leaders including I. Temjenba, S. Dahru, Veenyiyl Rhakho, Z. Ramyo, M. Assa, and Kevi Yalie, younger brother of Angami Zapu Phizo, who was then-President of the Naga National Council (NNC) and was in exile in London from 1956 till his death.
- All five members of Liaison Committee of Nagaland Peace Council (NPC) participated in discussion: Longri Ao, M. Aram, L. Lungalang, Kenneth Kerhuo, and Lungshim Shaiza.

== Discussions ==
There was a series of four discussions between Singh and the underground leaders. For some of these, Singh was assisted by Kampani, Ramunni, and Zopianga; for some he was not. In all four discussions held on 10 and 11 November 1975, the representatives from underground government and liaison committee participated.

== Agreement details ==
The outcome of the discussions were compiled into three-point agreement, that ultimately came to be known as historic "Shillong Accord of 1975."

1. The representatives of the underground organisations conveyed their decision, of their own volition, to accept, without condition, the Constitution of India.
2. It was agreed that the arms, now underground, would be brought out and deposited at appointed places. Details for giving effect of this agreement will be worked out between them and representatives of the Government, the security forces, and members of the Liaison Committee.
3. It was agreed that the representatives of the underground organisations should have reasonable time to formulate other issues for discussion for final settlement.

== Supplementary agreement ==
A supplementary agreement, detailing the process of depositing arms as per Clause 2 of the Accord, was signed on 5 January 1976, by Singh and underground representatives Biseto Medom Keyho, Pukrove Nakhro, I. Temjenba, and Z. Ramyo. The agreement detailed the implementation process of Clause 2, including the procedures for housing the underground members in peace camps.

1. It was decided that the collection of arms, initially at collection centres, would commence as early as possible, and will be completed by 25 January 1976. Initial places of collection to be decided through discussion between Commissioner, representatives of underground organisations and the members of the Liaison Committee.
2. Once all arms are collected, these will be handed over to Peace Council team at the respective places of collection.
3. Peace Council team will arrange to transport the arms from collection centres to Chedema peace camp and arrange guards, etc., for safe custody of arms.
4. Similar arrangement at agreed place/places will be made in Manipur with the concurrence of the Manipur Government.
5. The underground may stay at peace camps to be established at suitable places, and their maintenance will be arranged only by the Peace Council. Any voluntary contribution from any source will be made to the Peace Council who will utilize the fund according to necessity.

== Post-agreement consequences ==
The signing of Shillong Accord appears to have provided the final solution for the preceding 20 years of conflict; a large-scale of arms were surrendered, and the villagers enthusiastically participated in persuading the Naga underground rebels to join the mainstream. The agreement can also be interpreted as a victory for Indian government as Naga rebels agreed to accept the Indian constitution of their own volition, agreed to deposit the arms, and formulate other issues for discussions as part of final settlement.

=== Criticism ===
The detractors and critics of the Accord maintained that Clause 3 (which set out "reasonable time for the underground representatives to formulate other issues for discussion for the final settlement") remained unimplemented - as most of the Naga people and the Naga National Council leaders abroad didn't agree to endorse the agreement. They also criticized the fact that the agreement was signed by "representatives of the Naga underground," rather than the organizations like NNC or the Federal Government of Nagaland.

Many Nagas, who were not reconciled being part of Indian union of states, condemned the agreement that ultimately created factionalism among the rebels. When the negotiations were going on before signing the agreement, it is said that Isak Chishi Swu, then-NNC Vice-president, and Thuingaleng Muivah, then-NNC General secretary, with 150 rebels were on their way back from China and Burma-Naga territory where they established their base. Some critics also point out that Phizo, then-NNC president and who was in exile from 1956 in London, neither endorsed nor renounced the agreement; though, his younger brother Kevi Yalley represented underground organizations and signed Shillong Accord. It is also believed that both Isak and Muivah tried their best to convince some of their colleagues, especially Phizo to condemn the agreement, including sending a seven-member delegation urging Phizo to condemn the Shillong Accord without delay; however, it looks Phizo remained silent and their voice went unheard.

Both Isak and Muivah after five years of signing the accord, decided to restore the damaged image of the NNC for having accepted the Indian constitution, openly rejected the agreement terming it as a "betrayal" by the NNC and censured it as a complete "sell-out" of the Naga rights, including derogatory remarks against Phizo, and swore to fight for unquestionable sovereignty; thus, the trio Muivah, Isaac and S. Khaplang created National Socialist Council of Nagaland (NSCN) breaking-up[abandoning] from their old organization NNC on 2 February 1980. NSCN, in spite of emerging as a strong rebel group, never enjoyed the popular support that NNC enjoyed at its peak. By 1988, NSCN was further splintered on tribal lines into two different factions—NSCN(K), under Khaplang leadership, and NSCN(IM), under Isak and Muivah leadership. After the death of Phizo on 30 April 1990 in London, NNC further splintered into two more factions—NNC(A), under Phizo's daughter Adino's leadership, and NNC(K), led by previous NNC Vice-president Khodao Yanthan.

== See also ==
- Naga people#Statehood, factions and ceasefires
