= Sümi Naga =

Ethnic group in Nagaland, India

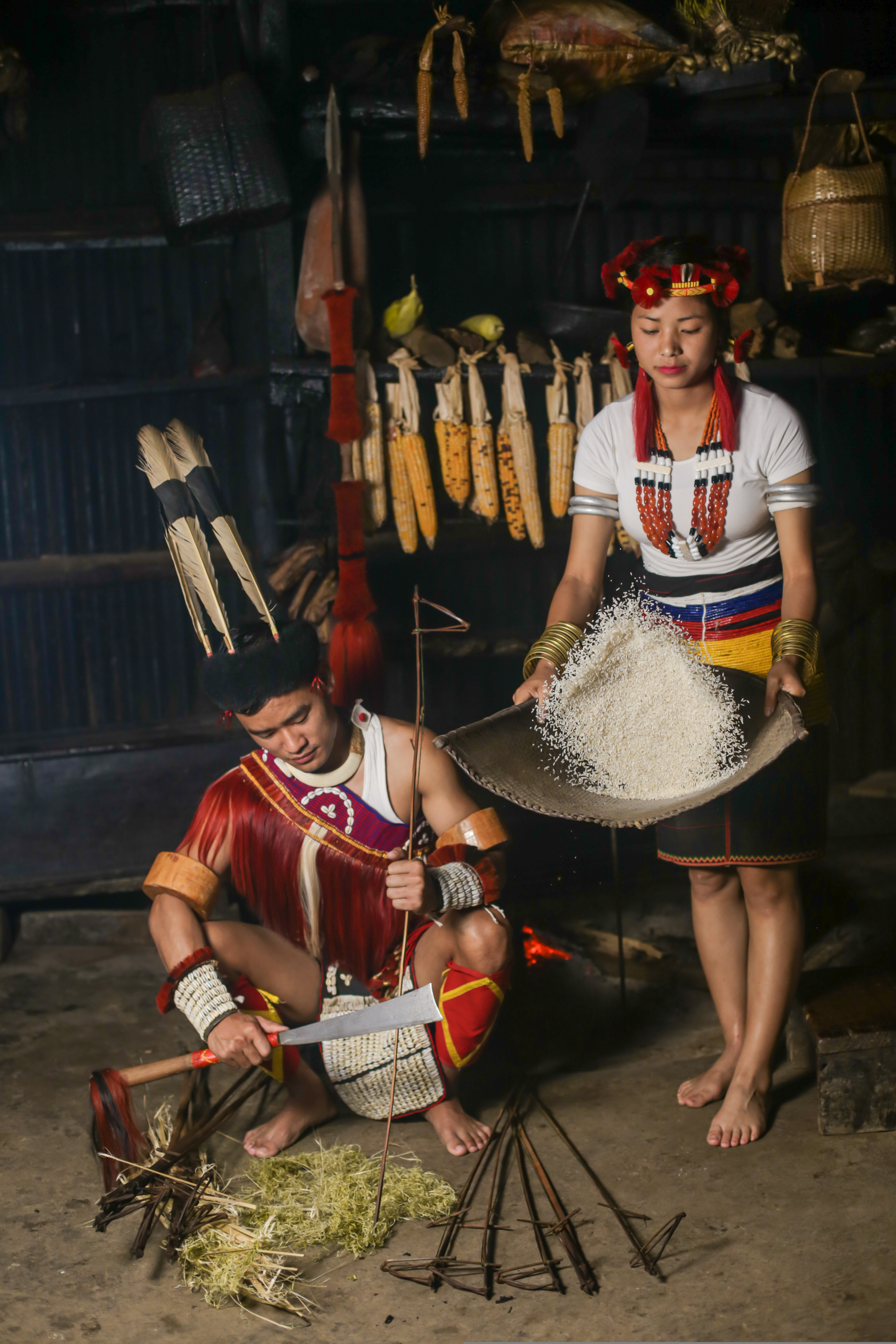
- Portrayal of a Sümi Naga couple in traditional attire.

Regions with significant populations
- India
- Nagaland: 236,313(2011)
- Assam: N/A

Languages
- Sümi and other Naga languages

Religion
- Christianity

Related ethnic groups
- Other Naga peoples

The Sümis are a major Naga ethnic group native to the northeast Indian state of Nagaland. They are found in the central and southern regions of Nagaland, primarily in the Zünheboto district and also in various parts of the state. Anthropological study of the Sümis is documented in the book The Sema Nagas by J. H. Hutton, who was a Professor of Social Anthropology in the University of Cambridge. The Sümi people are recognised as a Scheduled Tribe (ST's) by India.

== Origin ==
The Sümi, also known as Sema, are one of the major Naga tribes predominantly residing in Nagaland, India. Their origins are rooted in the broader history of Naga tribes, who are believed to have migrated from regions in present-day Myanmar into Northeast India.

They can be primarily found inhabiting the Zünheboto district which is native to the ethnic group. There are also sizable inhabitants of Sümi descents in Chümoukedima, Dimapur, Niuland and in few parts of Kiphire, mokokchung and wokha district. Sümi diaspora are also found in seven villages of Tinsukia District in Assam.

Oral traditions among the Sümi recount their migration from Khezhakeno, a village considered a common point of origin for several Naga tribes. From Khezhakeno, the Sümi dispersed in various directions, eventually settling in their current locations.

Historically, the Sümi were known for their warrior traditions, including headhunting, a practice common among Naga tribes before the advent of Christianity in the region. With the arrival of Christian missionaries in the early 20th century, the Sümi, like many other Naga tribes, underwent significant cultural transformations, embracing Christianity and abandoning traditional practices such as headhunting.

== Culture ==
=== Religion ===
The ancestral religion of the Sümis was the worship of nature. With the arrival of Baptist missionaries in the 20th century, like other Naga ethnic groups, today, Sümis are 99% Christians. Very few of them still practice animism.

==== Advent of Christianity ====
In November 1928, the American Baptist Foreign Mission Society (formerly, American Baptist Missionary Union) resolved to open a dedicated mission to work with the Sümis. Subsequently, the Sumi Baptist Association was founded in 1929 under the name of Sumi Baptist Akukuhou Kuqhakulu (Sumi Baptist Church Association, SBAK). In 1936, Reverend Anderson was assigned to supervise the mission. He was designated to build a mission centre at Aizuto near Lokobomi village. Anderson lived in the new centre only briefly from 1949 to 1950. He was soon replaced by Reverend Delano who became the first Christian missionary to live permanently among the Sümis. Delano lived in the mission from 1949 to 1955 until his family and he were asked to leave by the Indian government who expelled all the missionaries from the Naga Hills.

=== Festivals ===
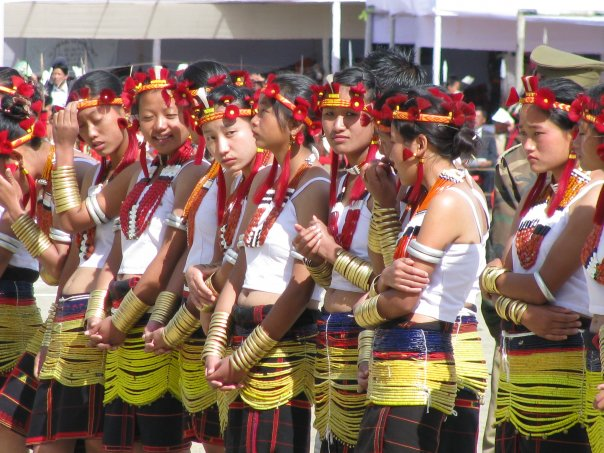
Sümi women in traditional costume.

The Sümis celebrate many festivals which have been carried down from generations. Most of these festivals usually mark the beginning of new seasons, harvesting of new crops or victory at war. The two major festivals that are currently popular among them are:

==== Tülüni ====
Tülüni (July 8) is a festival of great significance for the Sümis. This festival is marked with feasts as the occasion occurs in the bountiful season of the year. Drinking rice beer indispensably forms as part of the feasts. Rice beer is served in a goblet made of bamboo or made from the leaf of plantain. Rice Beer is an everyday diet for the Nagas and Sümi Nagas in general. However, Tülüni is not a feast to celebrate or worship Rice beer. Tülüni is also called "Anni" the word of which denotes the season of plentiful crops. This midyear festival is a time of communal harmony and merry-making for the Sümi community. Slaughtering of pigs, cows and mithun is an important feature of this festival. Tülüni, is a festive season which marks season of plenty, a season to bond relationship through marriage ties, settle differences amongst friends and foes. In short, it is a season to mend broken relations and to celebrate togetherness, unity and harmony.

During this festival, the betrothed exchange a basketful of gifts with meals. The fiance is invited to a grand dinner at the fiancee's residence. Even siblings of the families of both the bride and groom exchange dinner and packed food and meats - wrapped the traditional way in plantain leaves. Historically it was a time of joy celebrated by the whole community including servants and housekeepers. On this day they were fed extra generously with good food and meat.

The practice of working in groups is common for the Sümi agriculture farmers, and Tülüni is a special time for them because they get to rest and celebrate the completion of a farming season of hard work in their paddy fields. For this festival, the farmer groups (also called Aloji) pool in money or other resources together to exchange/buy pigs and cows to be slaughtered for the special day. The meat is equally divided among themselves and some portion is kept aside for the group feast. In the midst of the feast, group leaders get extra offers of meat by way of feeding them by others. Each working group consists of 20 to 30 in number which includes several women, too. The new recruits are also made to join the group at this grand feast.

The betrothed are settled at this period. The fervours of the feast is synchronised with a chain of folk songs and ballads. In modern times, friends and members from other ethnic groups and communities are invited to attend the feast and are entertained with a variety of traditional songs and dances, they are also served with sumptuous authentic Sümi cuisine of smoked pork and axone with local herbs and vegetables.

By virtue of two separate clans the gennas and rituals differ between Sümi and Tukumi. Among all other festivals and gennas. Sümi, in general, accept the festival of Tülüni as the most grand and important one.

==== Ahuna ====
Ahuna (14 November) is a traditional post-harvest festival of the Sümis. Ahuna signifies the celebration of the season's harvest in Thanksgiving, while invoking the spirit of good fortune in the New Year. On this occasion, the entire community prepares and feasts on the first meal of rice drawn from the season's harvest cooked in bamboo segments. The receptacles for cooking or serving on this occasion are freshly made, curved or cut, from locally available resources prolific and abundant in the countryside.

Ahuna is celebrated on 13 and 14 November and now holds the status of the official festival of the Sümi Nagas because it falls in a dry season and accessibility for visitors in terms of road conditions are better. Tülüni is still the most respected festival for the local Sümi.

== Notable people ==
- Y. Hewoto Awomi, politician
- G. Kaito Aye, politician
- K. L. Chishi, politician
- Hekani Jakhalu Kense, politician
- Alobo Naga, musician
- Hokato Hotozhe Sema, sportsperson
- Hokishe Sema (1921–2007), politician
- H. K. Sema, former Supreme Court Judge
- Shikiho Sema, politician
- Isak Chishi Swu (1929–2016), Naga nationalist leader
- Scato Swu, politician
- Kihoto Hollohon Yepthomi, (1932–2021), politician
- Tokheho Yepthomi, politician
- Jacob Zhimomi, politician
- H. Khekiho Zhimomi (1946–2015), politician
