= Dimapur Jain Temple =

Jaim temple in Dimapur, India

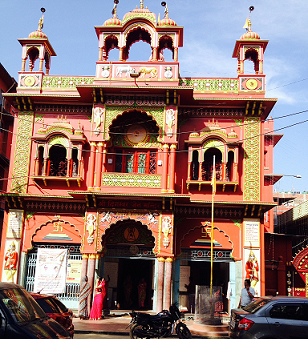
- Dimapur Jain Temple

- Location within Nagaland Dimapur Jain Temple (India)

Religion
- Affiliation: Jainism
- Sect: Digambar
- Deity: Mahavira
- Festivals: Mahavir Jayanti, Paryushan

Location
- Location: Dimapur, Dimapur, Nagaland, India
- Interactive map of Dimapur Jain Temple
- Coordinates: 25.9200°N 93.7300°E

Architecture
- Creator: Shri Phulchand Sethi, Shri Jethmal Sethi, Shri Udayram Chabra and Shri Kanhaiyalal Sethi
- Established: 1947

Dimapur Jain Temple is a Jain temple in Dimapur, which was built in 1947. The temple is located on Jain Temple Road and has Lord Mahavira as its Moolnayak (primary deity). The temple is under the aegis of the SD Jain Samaj Dimapur.

== History ==
In the pre-independent India, most of the Jain families were settled in Kohima. All these families belonged to the Digambara sect. In 1920, eight Sethi families, who were non-Naga Settlers, built the first Jain temple in Kohima. However, these families moved to Dimapur in 1944 due to the Japanese invasion during World War II. These families then built the Dimapur Jain Temple, SD Jain School, and SD Jain Charitable Hospital. The most prominent among these were Phulchand Sethi, Jethmal Sethi, Kanhaiyalal Sethi, Hardev Sethi, Hiralal Sethi, and Mangilal Chabra. Phulchand Sethi was the first secretary of the SD Jain Samaj, Dimapur, and held this post till 1976. Udayram Ji Chabra was the first president of the SD Jain Samaj followed by Jethmal Sethi.

== The Temple Complex ==
The Moolnayak of the temple is Lord Mahavira. In the back portion of the temple, the statues of Lord Adinath, Lord Bahubali, and Lord Bharat Swami stand tall. The back of the temple was built later in 1989. The Panch kalyanak of the statues was conducted by Ganini Shri Suparshmati Mataji in 1989. On the first floor is the Samavsaran and the Chaubisi (idols of all the twenty-four Tirthankaras).

== Gallery ==
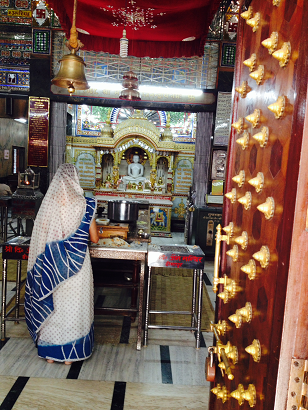
Mulnayak Pratima at Jain Temple, Dimapur

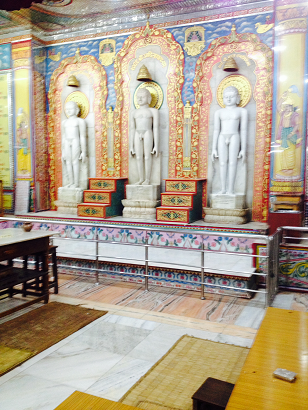
Trimurti at Jain Temple, Dimapur

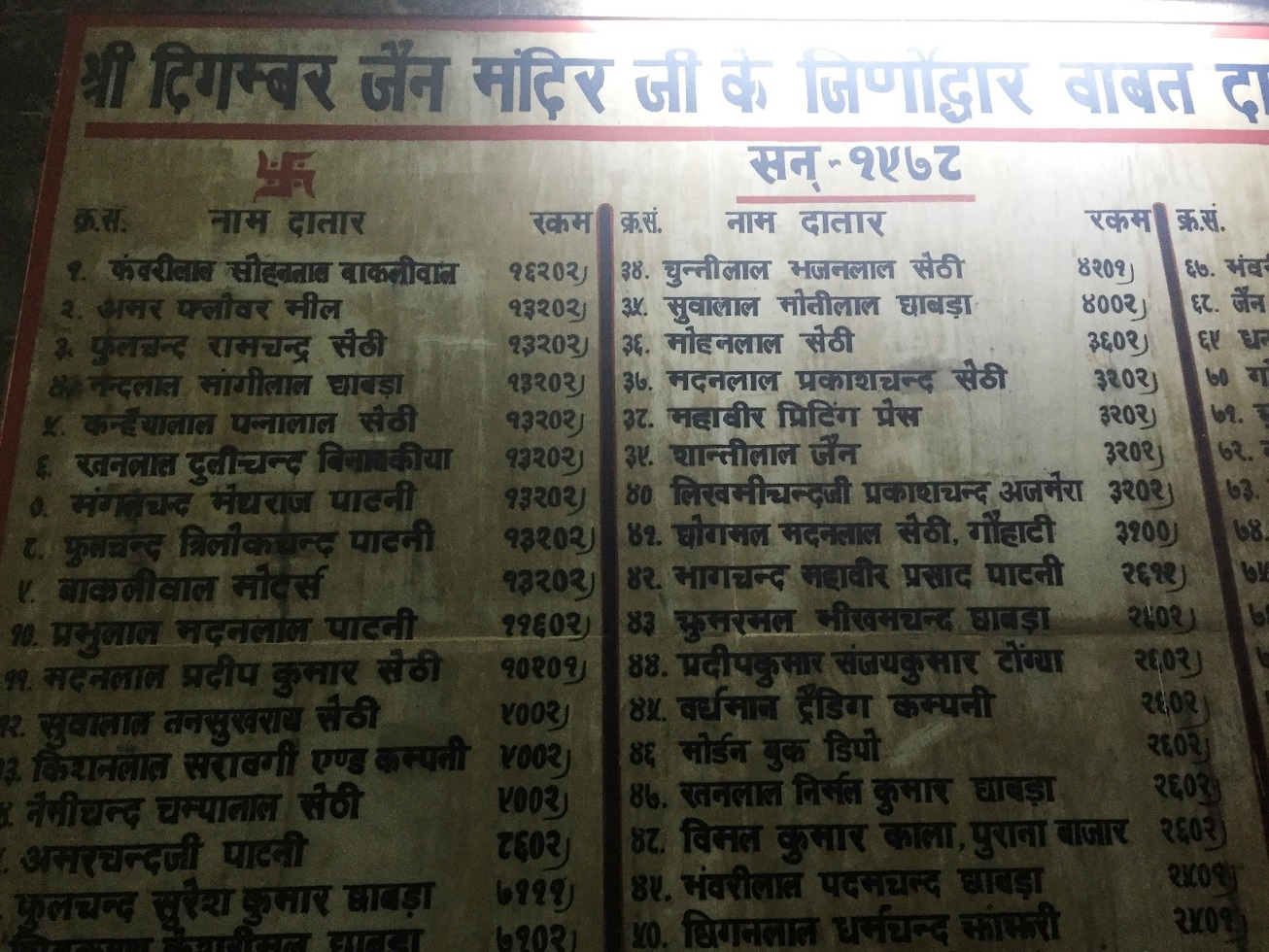
The Original list of Donor's of Jain Temple Dimapur

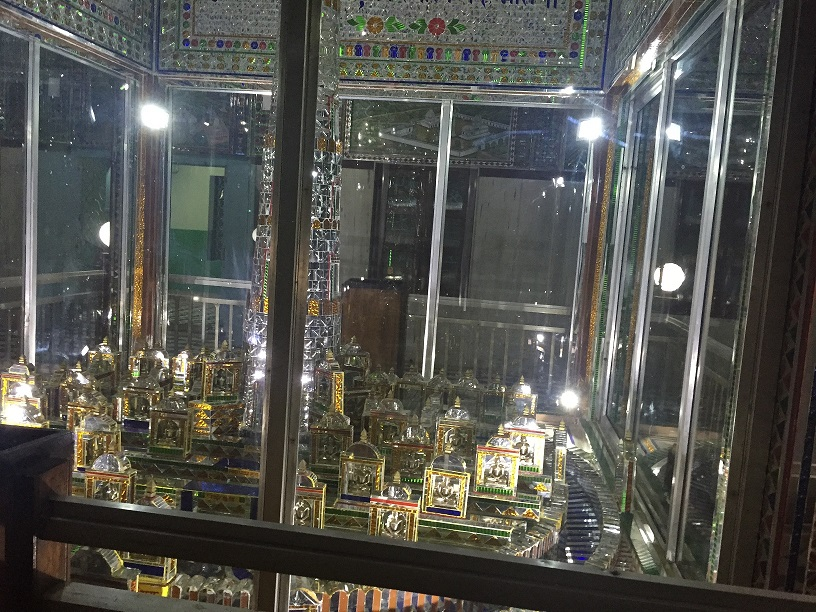
Samavsaran at Jain Temple Dimapur

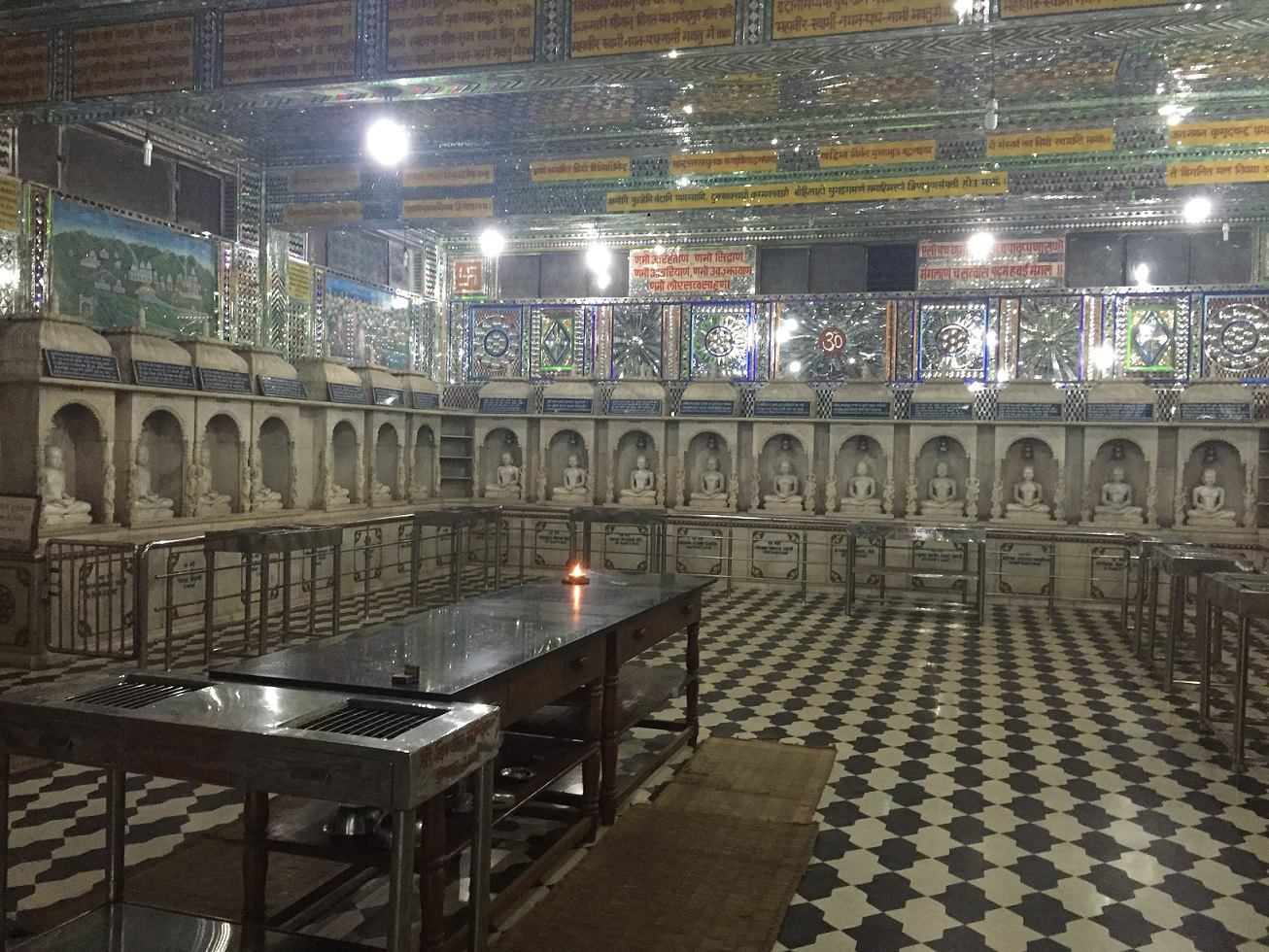
Idols of the 24 Jain Tirthankars at Jain Temple Dimapur

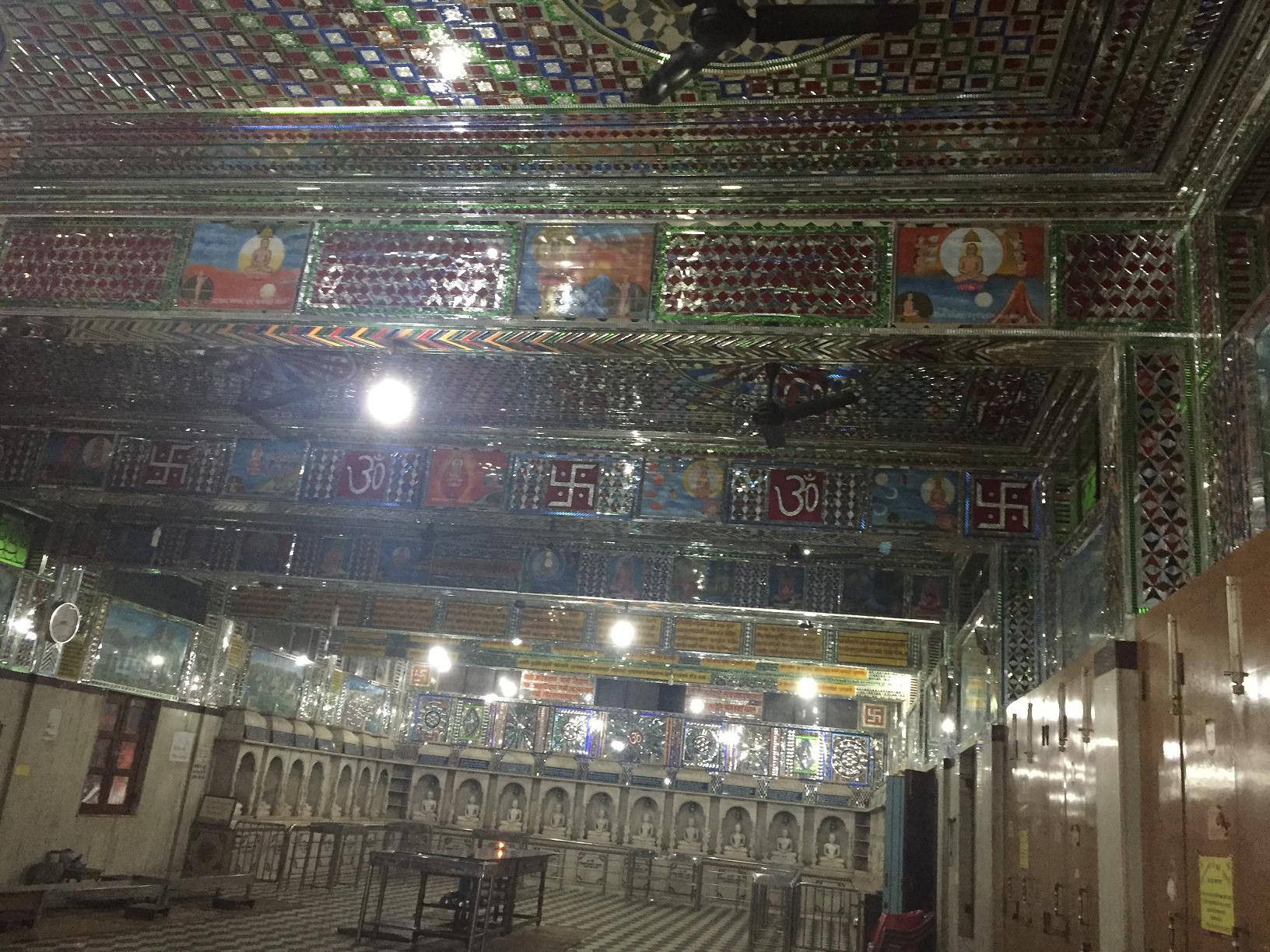
The intricate glass work inside the Dimapur Jain Temple

== See also ==
- Jainism in Nagaland
- Dimapur

== Sources ==
- Sethi, Raj Kumar (2021), 100 years of Jainism in Nagaland - (A journey from 1885 to 1985), Walnut Publication, ISBN 978-93-91522-04-9
