= Ura Mail =

Indian newspaper

- Front page on 23 September 1992, the day its editor and publisher Chalie Kevichüsa was assassinated
- Type: Weekly newspaper
- Publisher: Chalie Kevichüsa; Pankaj Sinha
- Editor-in-chief: Chalie Kevichüsa
- Founded: 1975
- Language: English
- City: Dimapur, Nagaland
- Country: India

Ura Mail was a weekly English newspaper published from Dimapur. It was the first local English weekly newspaper published from Nagaland, India.

== Journalists ==
On 23 September 1992, Chalie Kevichüsa, the editor-in-chief of Ura Mail was assassinated while he was dropping his daughter for her tuition class, when armed men from the NSCN-IM opened fire on his vehicle after several days of tracking his movements at Fellowship Colony, Dimapur. Kevichüsa was killed and his daughter was wounded.

== See also ==
- List of newspapers in Nagaland
