= God Bless Nagaland =

- National anthem of Nagalim; De facto state song of Nagaland, India
- Lyrics: Razhukhrielie Kevichüsa, 2005; 21 years ago
- Music: Razhukhrielie Kevichüsa, 2005; 21 years ago
- Adopted: 2024 (national anthem)

"God Bless Nagaland" is a Naga patriotic song written and composed by Razhukhrielie Kevichüsa. The song draws inspiration from Deuteronomy 11:11-12. It serves as the de facto state song of the Indian state of Nagaland. In 2024, the Forum for Naga Reconciliation adopted it as the Naga national anthem.

== History ==
The song was written and composed by Razhukhrielie Kevichüsa in 2005. It was inspired by Deuteronomy 11:11–12. The song was approved by the 56th Tatar Hoho Session (NNC), on 26 January 2006 at Oking Kohima. In 2024, the Forum for Naga Reconciliation (FNR) announced the adoption of "God Bless Nagaland" as the Naga national anthem. The decision followed meetings between the FNR and Naga political groups on 6 March and 13 April 2024. The FNR stated that the anthem was to be sung at important occasions by Naga political groups, educational institutions, civil bodies and other organisations.

== Lyrics ==
God Bless Nagaland, land that I love.
A land of hills and valleys, that drinks rain from heaven,
God will take care of you, until the end.
His eyes will always be on you,
My fair Nagaland.

== Notable performances ==
On 1 December 2019, a choir of 1060 school students performed "God Bless Nagaland" during the 57th Nagaland Statehood Day celebrations at Khuochiezie (Kohima Local Ground).

== See also ==
- Naga nationalism
- List of Indian state songs
