= Theyiechüthie Sakhrie =

Indian non violence advocate

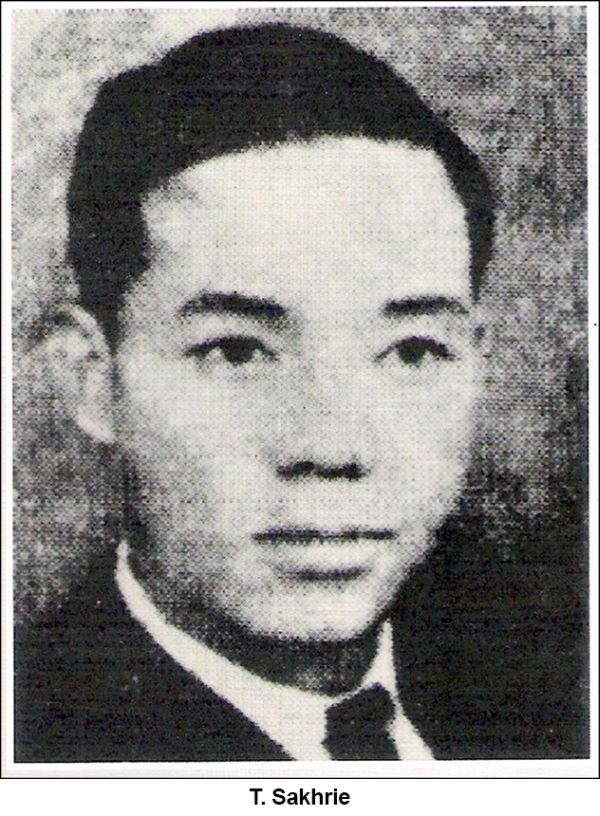
- Born: Theyiechüthie Sakhrie; 1908; Khonoma, Naga Hills District, Assam Province, British India (Now in Nagaland, India)
- Died: 17 January 1956 (aged 47–48); Kohima, Naga Hills District, Assam Province, British India (Now in Nagaland, India)
- Occupations: Social activist and Politician
- Known for: Naga National Council, advocacy for non-violence

Theyiechüthie Sakhrie (died January 1956), commonly known as T. Sakhrie, was a Naga nationalist from Khonoma, India who served as secretary of the Naga National Council (NNC). A leading moderate in the movement, he favoured a negotiated settlement with India and opposed the turn to armed struggle led by A. Z. Phizo. He was assassinated in January 1956, allegedly on Phizo's orders.

== Early life and education ==
Sakhrie was from the Angami Naga village of Khonoma, in the Naga Hills District (now in Kohima district, Nagaland), which had a long history of resistance to British rule. He came from the same village as A. Z. Phizo, but they belonged to different clans.

== Career ==
As India geared for independence from British colonial rule, in late 1946, Sakhrie proclaimed that the Nagas must take the initiative to determine its future in the post-colonial world.

As the secretary of the Naga National Council (NNC), Sakhrie signed the council's memorandum of 20 February 1947, which set out the Naga case for self-determination and asked the British and Indian governments to establish an interim Naga administration for ten years, after which the Naga people should be allowed to choose their own form of government. Sakhrie led the organisation of the Naga Plebiscite, involved in printing the ballot papers in Imphal and transporting them to Khonoma by truck. He oversaw their dispatch to Naga villages rolled in bamboo cylinders.

As a leader within the NNC, Sakhrie was known for his belief in non-violent methods of protest and negotiation. Sakhrie was deeply inspired by the principles of non-violence and forgiveness, which he regarded as one of the fundamental core teachings of the Holy Bible.

== Assassination ==
Within the NNC, Sakhrie belonged to the moderate wing that was willing to seek an accommodation within India, while Phizo pressed for full sovereignty and armed resistance. The two fell out, and in January 1956 Sakhrie was assassinated by members of Phizo's faction, allegedly on Phizo's orders. The killing set off a blood feud between the two families that endured for years.

On 1 February 1956, the Assam Government announced cash relief for his family. Under this, Sakhrie's mother received a lumpsum of INR 2000 and his wife and INR 3000 for his wife. The state government also announced that his children will be granted free studentships and scholarships, if necessary. A few days later, on 4 February 1956, the Assam Government announced a sum of INR 5000 to anyone who provides clues leading to the arrest of Phizo.

== Legacy ==
Sakhrie is remembered in Nagaland as a moderate who advocated a non-violent, negotiated path within the Naga political movement. His son, Labu Sakhrie, was among the founding members of the Naga People's Movement for Human Rights. A book was also released to commemorate his 50th death annivarsary
