= Razhukhrielie Kevichüsa =

Naga musician and bureaucrat (1941–2022)

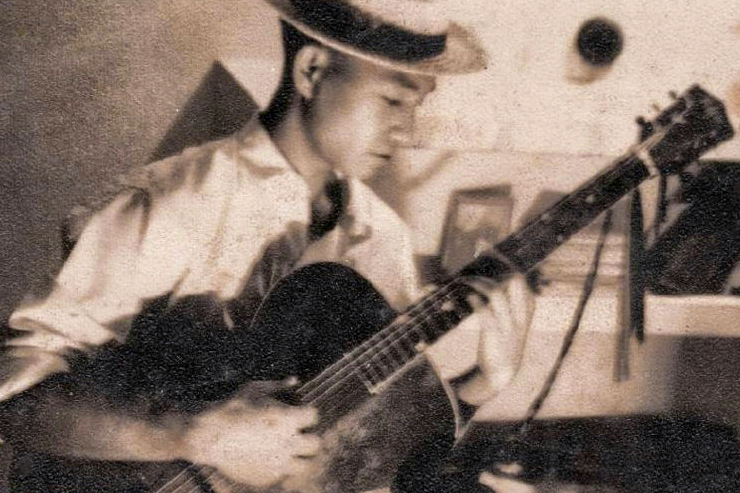
- Kevichüsa performing on stage in his younger days
- Born: Razhukhrielie Kevichüsa Meru; 21 October 1941; Tezpur, Assam Province, British India (Now Tezpur, Assam, India)
- Died: 20 August 2022 (aged 80); Dimapur, Nagaland, India
- Occupations: Bureaucrat; Musician
- Spouse: Ethel Kevichüsa
- Parents: Kevichüsa Angami (father); Germanthangi (mother)
- Relatives: Chalie Kevichüsa (brother); Tubu Kevichüsa (brother)
- Family: Kevichüsa family

Razhukhrielie Kevichüsa Meru (/ˈkɛvitʃsə/; 21 October 1941 – 20 August 2022) was an Indian bureaucrat and musician from Nagaland. He served the Government of Nagaland as the administrative head of many significant departments in the state until his retirement in 2001. He was also a music composer and has written and composed the Naga patriotic song "God Bless Nagaland". Kevichüsa also composed a number of Angami gospel and secular songs, notably "Lie Me Re Vi Zhüte" and "Khrüthemvü", his most popular composed songs.

== Early life ==
Razhukhrielie Kevichüsa Meru was born on 21 October 1941 in Tezpur, Assam.

Razhukhrielie's father Kevichüsa Angami, was Angami Naga from Khonoma and his mother Germanthangi was of Mizo descent from present-day Mizoram.

== Career ==
Kevichüsa was trained as an agriculture engineer and was later inducted into the Indian Administrative Service (IAS) and also served as the Deputy Commissioner of Kohima District.

He served the Government of Nagaland in various posts such as the Head of Department (HoD) of Agriculture, Art & Culture, Health & Family Welfare and Works & Housing.

He retired from service in 2001. Following his retirement, he served as Chairman of the Nagaland Public Service Commission (NPSC).

=== Music ===
Kevichüsa was trained as a classical violin performer and has composed numerous songs, both gospel and secular. A music album entitled Songs of R. Kevichusa: The Tenyidie Collection was released 17 November 2019.

== Personal life ==
=== Family ===
Kevichüsa was married to Ethel. She is of Lotha Naga descent. Together the couple had six children and six grandsons.

== Death ==
Kevichüsa died at 10:23 Indian Standard Time (UTC+05:30), at Dimapur's Zion Hospital on 20 August 2022, aged 80.
