= Tubu Kevichüsa =

Naga nationalist leader

- Born: Perietsü Kevichüsa Meru; 30 March 1948
- Died: 4 June 1996 (aged 48); Dimapur, Nagaland
- Occupation: General Secretary of Naga National Council
- Parents: Kevichüsa Angami (father); Germanthangi (mother)
- Relatives: Chalie Kevichüsa (brother); Razhukhrielie Kevichüsa (brother)
- Family: Kevichüsa family

Perietsü Kevichüsa Meru (/ˈkɛvitʃsə/; 30 March 1948 – 4 June 1996), commonly known as Tubu Kevichüsa was a politician from Nagaland, India who served as the General Secretary of Naga National Council until his assassination in June 1996 by armed men from the NSCN-IM. His brother Chalie Kevichüsa was also assassinated by the NSCN-IM in September 1992.

== Early life ==
Perietsü Tubu Kevichüsa was born on 30 March 1948 in Kohima to a prominent family with significant political influence in Nagaland throughout the last half of the 20th century. His mother and father were Germanthangi and Kevichüsa Angami. His mother is Mizo, originating from present-day Mizoram. His father is Angami Naga, originating from Khonoma.

== Career ==
Kevichüsa began his career as a lawyer but left India in the 1980s to work with the separatist Federal Government of Nagaland under Angami Zapu Phizo.

On 9 July 1983, Kevichüsa wrote a letter to Isak Chishi Swu and Thuingaleng Muivah, with an intention to remind them that the formation of NSCN was wrong.

His letter is quoted as follow:

“You simply just cannot expect the people to accept a manifesto drafted in a remote jungle hideout as a gospel truth! Our people have a strong sense of tradition and the only ism that they know is Naga Nationalism so that a Socialist manifesto is an obscure to them as some ancient Egyptian hieroglyphic. As for the intellectuals and pseudo intellectuals, a Socialist manifesto is just another piece of literature which they come across daily, to be read, discarded and forgotten”.

“What I am trying to say is that while both of you (Isak C. are Swu and Thuingaleng Muivah) capable leaders, none of you are theoreticians. Hence your attempt to provide a new theoretical basis for the Nagas is bound to fail. With certain exceptions, theoreticians cannot be leaders and leaders cannot be theoreticians. And what I am trying to plead for is that we, just cannot ignore tradition and we must never pollute the spirit of Naga Nationalism with other forms of ism”.

== Assassination ==
On 4 June 1996, around midnight Kevichüsa was assassinated by armed rebels from the NSCN-IM at his personal residence at Burma Camp, Dimapur.

=== Funeral ===
At the funeral, Razhukhrielie Kevichüsa, the eldest brother said:

“We forgive those who have done this.”

Khrielie Kevichüsa also said the same at the funeral of Tubu's elder brother Chalie Kevichüsa in 1992.

On his tombstone at the Kevichüsa's Family Burial Ground is engraved, the Bible verse Isaiah 49:4 from the New International Version:

I have labored in vain; I have spent my strength for nothing at all. Yet what is due me is in the Lord’s hand, and my reward is with my God.

=== NSCN-IM's response ===
Deepak Dewan, the Political Editor of North East Sun asked Thuingaleng Muivah in Bangkok, Thailand, on the killing of Kevichüsa, Muivah said:

“His (Chalie's) brother deserved to be shot. And we don't make any secret of it. You know how Tubu behaved. How he started condemning everybody. He did not have any regard for any national workers. And he started projecting himself as a person who was all in all.”

— (Quote: North East Sun, 1-14 August 1998 issue, page 15)
