= Zuboni Hümtsoe =

Indian activist (1990–2017)

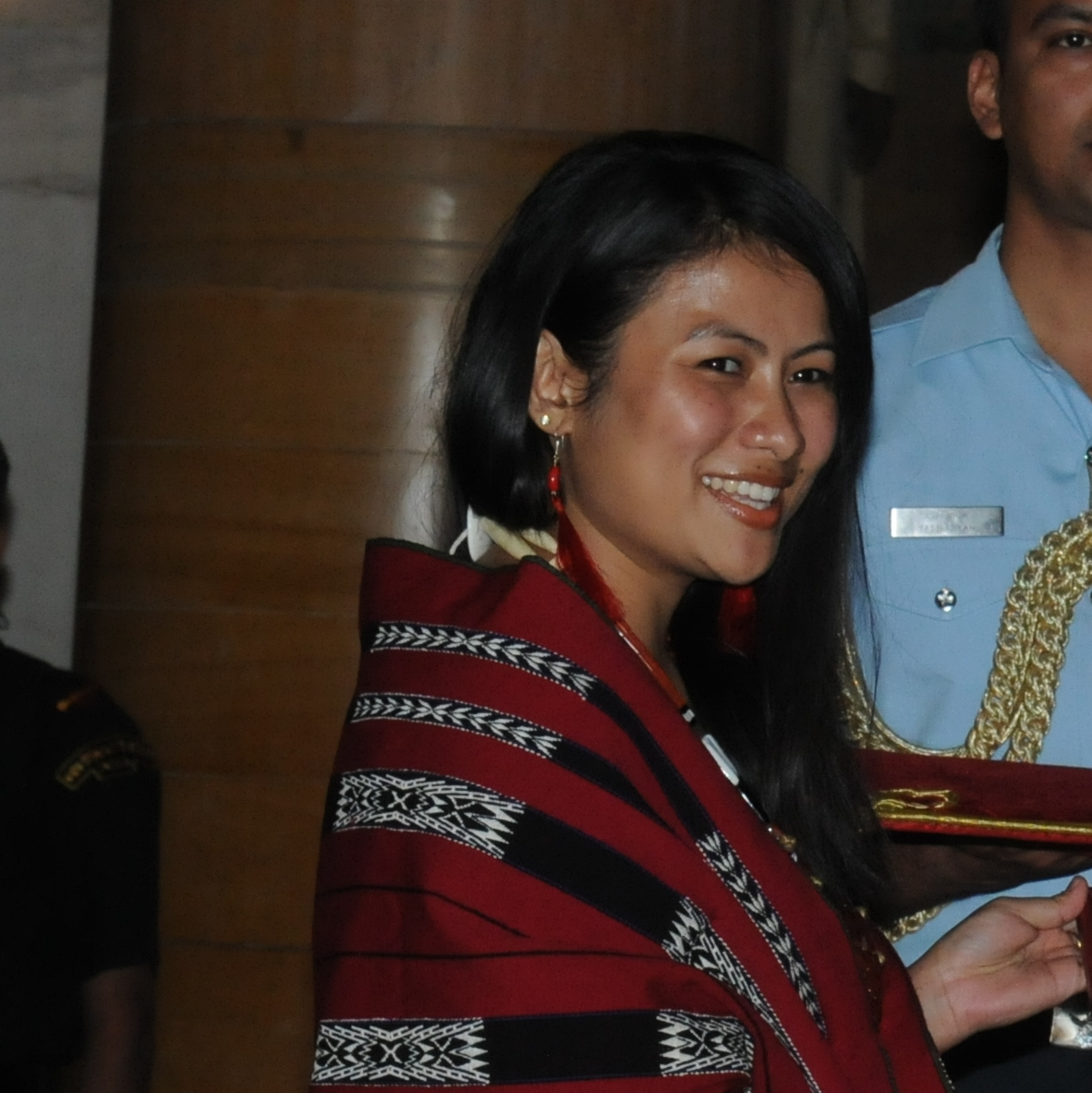
- Born: 1990; Nagaland, India
- Died: 13 November 2017 (aged 26–27); Dimapur, Nagaland, India
- Other name: the "Modi Girl"
- Education: Delhi University
- Occupation: entrepreneur
- Known for: founding PreciousMeLove

Zuboni Hümtsoe (1990 – 13 November 2017) was an Indian entrepreneur from Nagaland who started an online fashion and handicraft brand called PreciousMeLove in Nagaland. She was given the Nari Shakti Puraskar, a national award.

On 13 November 2017, Hümtsoe was found dead at her home in Dimapur, Nagaland; her death was ruled a suicide. Her businesses continued to be led by her sister Lozano, in Dimapur.

== Life ==
Hümtsoe was born in 1990 in Nagaland. She went to Delhi University and she had experimented with selling foreign fashion items that were imported by her air hostess sister Lozano Hümtsoe. They were able to buy garments cheaply but they could not cope with the range of sizes expected by customers.

She was responsible for the founding of PreciousMeLove in 2011. The funding came from a 3500 rupee college grant and she said that this powered by an ambition created by the death of her father.

The brand was led by an all female team and it was based in Dimapur in Nagaland. PreciousMeLove was aspiring to be the "Made in Nagaland" brand.

She came to notice as the "Modi Girl" after the Prime Minister visited where she was exhibiting but he started to leave without seeing her products. She ran after him and persuaded him to return to see her display.

On International Women's Day in 2017, she was in New Delhi where they were awarded the Nari Shakti Puraskar by President Pranab Mukherjee at the Rashtrapati Bhavan.

She was found dead on 13 November 2017. It was agreed that it was a suicide. The business continued thanks to Hümtsoe, sister, Lozano Hümtsoe and the Women Resource Development Department, Government of Nagaland. There are two businesses, PreciousMeLove (PML) and Nungshiba Handicrafts. PML creates women's fashion clothes and Nungshiba Handicrafts which is next door makes the scraps into "Naga Dolls" which are made in Nagaland but inspired by Japanese fabric dolls.
