= Chalie Kevichüsa =

Naga journalist

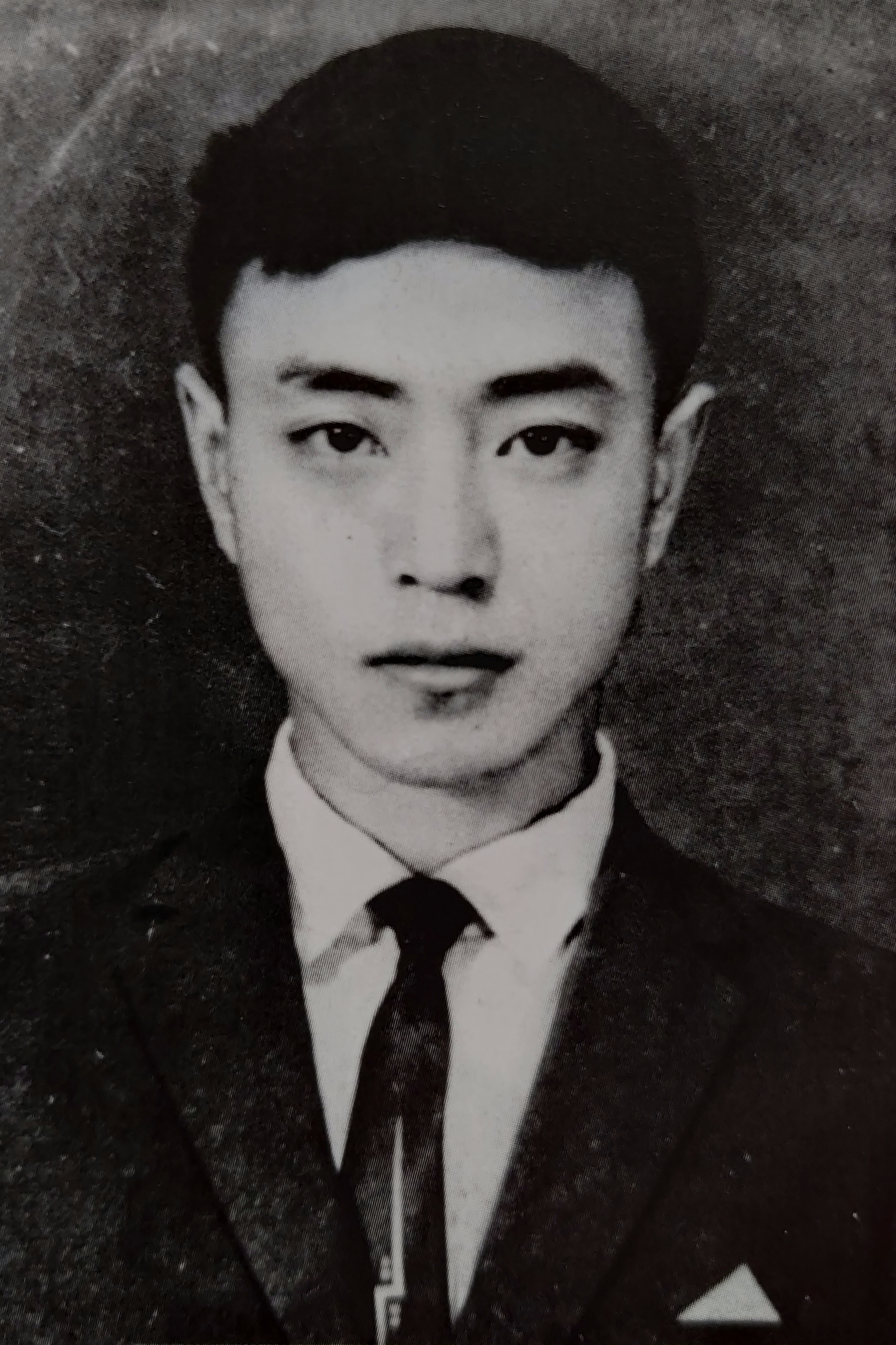
- Kevichüsa as a young man
- Born: Thechazelhu Kevichüsa Meru; 13 May 1943; Kohima, Naga Hills District, Assam Province, British India (Now in Nagaland, India)
- Died: 23 September 1992 (aged 49); Dimapur, Nagaland, India
- Education: St. Edmund's College, Shillong (BA)
- Occupation(s): Executive editor and Publisher, Ura Mail
- Spouse: Seyievino Kevichüsa (m. 1971)
- Father: Kevichüsa Angami
- Relatives: Razhukhrielie Kevichüsa (brother); Tubu Kevichüsa (brother)
- Family: Kevichüsa family

Thechazelhu Kevichüsa Meru (/ˈkɛvitʃsə/; 13 May 1943 – 23 September 1992), commonly known as Chalie Kevichüsa, was an Indian journalist from Nagaland who was also involved in politics. He was the executive editor and publisher of Ura Mail from June 1976 until his assassination in September 1992.

== Early life ==
Thechazelhu Chalie Kevichüsa was born on 13 May 1943 at Mission Compound, Kohima. His mother and father were Germanthangi and Kevichüsa Angami. His mother is Mizo originating from present-day Mizoram. His father is Angami Naga originating from Khonoma.

In 1967, he completed his graduation with a Bachelor of Arts degree from St. Edmund's College, Shillong.

== Career ==
Kevichüsa first began his political career in 1968 when he joined the United Front of Nagaland (UFN) as a voluntary party worker. While still a party worker he also served as the Head Master of Central High School, Dimapur.

Chalie Kevichüsa then served as the editor and publisher of Ura Mail from June 1976.

With the proclamation of Emergency in 1975, Kevichüsa along with other party leaders were incarcerated in the Nowgaon Special Jail from November 1976 to March 1977.

In August 1992, Kevichüsa founded the Democratic Labour Party.

== Assassination ==
Chalie Kevichüsa was assassinated on Wednesday, 23 September 1992. He was dropping his daughter for her tuition class, when armed men from the NSCN-IM opened fire on his vehicle after several days of tracking his movements at Fellowship Colony, Dimapur. Kevichüsa was killed and his daughter was wounded.

=== Reactions ===
Large protest processions were held in Dimapur and Kohima against his killing, and a large number of people turned out at his funeral.

=== Funeral ===
At the funeral service, Razhukhrielie Kevichüsa, the elder brother of Chalie Kevichüsa said:

“We as a family forgive those who have done this.”

“...the family, the clan and the tribe will not let violence and blood flow again”

“those who killed our brother are also our brothers and there is no scope for vengeance”.

=== NSCN-IM's response ===
In his interview with Deepak Dewan, the Political Editor of North East Sun Magazine on 28 November 1998 when asked about Chalie Kevichüsa, Thuingaleng Muivah said:

“Mr. Chalie joined politics and started propagating the Shillong Accord very actively. There were some persons who had been given the authority of settling the Indo–Naga issue among themselves, sidelining most other forces. We have to make them realise their mistakes. In the process many will die. Chalie's killing, whether by us or by anyone else will not be a surprise. Thousands of Nagas are dying and many more will die. There is not much reason why Kevichüsa and Chalie be singled out or Lungshim (Note: Lungshim Shaiza was assassinated by the NSCN on 27 January 1990. He was the younger brother of Yangmaso Shaiza, the 4th Chief Minister of Manipur.) should be singled out”

— (Quote: North East Sun Magazine, from 28 November 1998 interview)

== Personal life ==
=== Family ===
Kevichüsa married Seyievino on 20 January 1971. Together the couple had three daughters and two sons.
