= Guybon Henry Damant =

British Political Officer

- Born: 9 May 1846; Isle of Wight, Cowes, Hampshire, England
- Died: 14 October 1879 (aged 33); Khonoma (present day in Kohima District, Nagaland, India)
- Other names: G. H. Damant
- Occupation(s): British Political Officer and Ethnographist
- Spouse: Caroline Rebecca Thompson

Guybon Henry Damant (9 May 1846 – 22 November 1879) was a British Political Officer and ethnographist who served as the Deputy Commissioner of Kohima.

In 1879, Damant and 35 of his team men were killed in an ambush by Naga warriors at Khonoma; the attack led the British responding with a series of campaigns which ultimately led to the British gaining complete control over the Naga Hills.

== Early life ==
Guybon Henry Damant was born on 9 May 1846 in Isle of Wight, Cowes, Hampshire, England to Henry James Damant and Elizabeth Johnson Knight.

== Death and legacy ==
On 13 October 1879 Damant set out to visit Jotsoma, Khonoma and Mezoma villages with an escort of 65 constables of the Frontier Police and 21 Rifles from the 43rd Assam Light Infantry because the Naga villages were secretly acquiring arms and ammunition. The next day, Damant was killed along with 35 of his men.

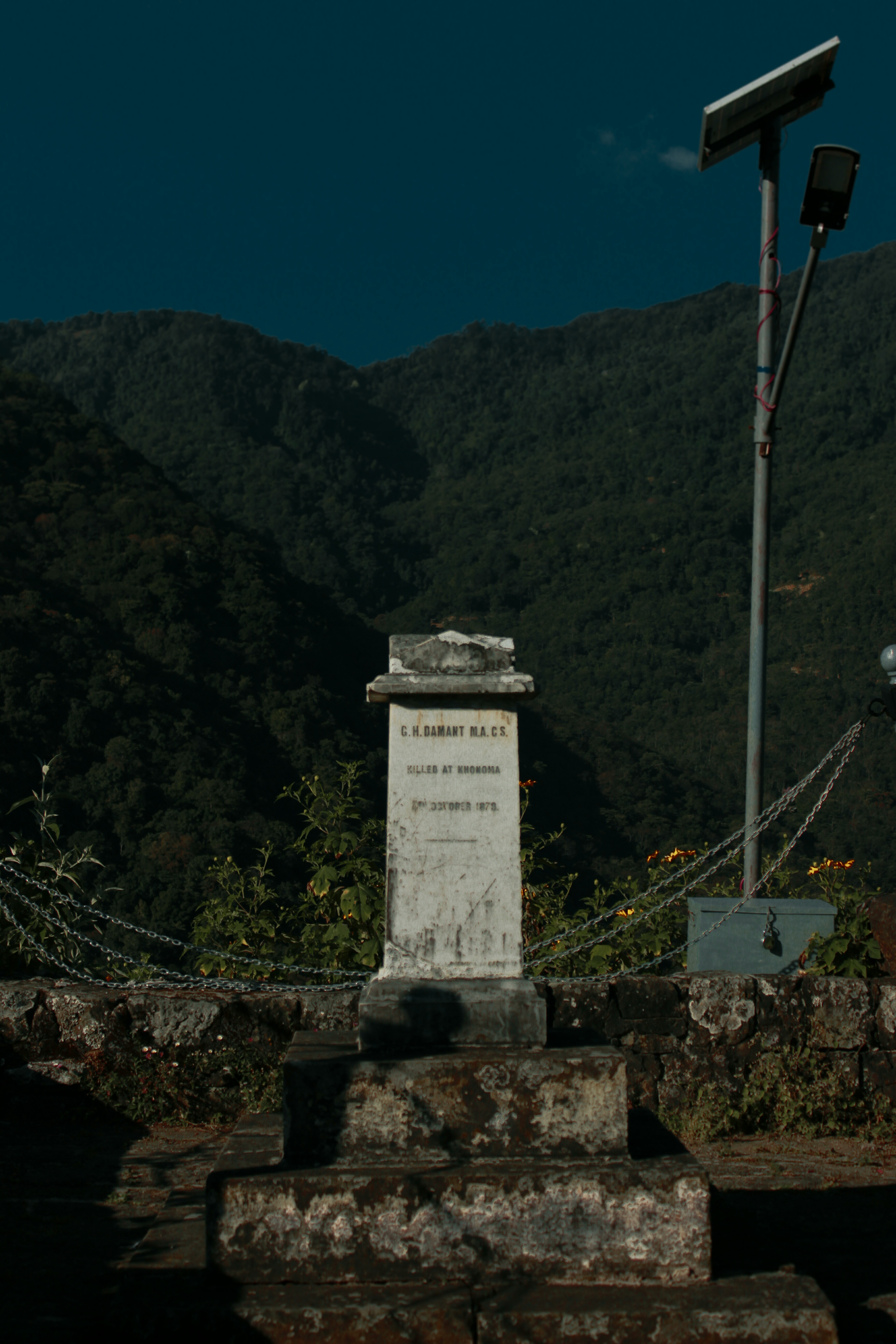
Memorial of Damant at Khonoma

Following the death of Damant, a campaign against the Nagas ensued in which the 42nd and 44th Regiments with a wing of the 18th Native Infantry and a detachment of the 43rd Native Infantry took part. The campaign lasted till March 1880 and Khonoma was taken on the 22 November 1879.
