= Jainism in Nagaland =

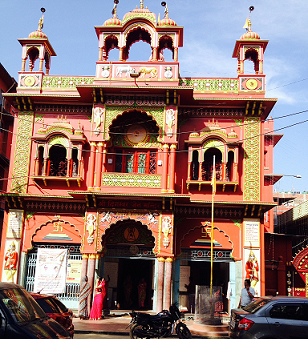
Jain temple in Dimapur, Dimapur district

The northeast Indian state of Nagaland has had a long association with Jainism. Today the state has two Jain temples and has become home to hundreds of Jain families living prosperously and peacefully.

== History ==
The first Jain temple in Nagaland was established in Kohima. The temple was established in 1920 by a group of 8 Jain families, prominent among them being Hardev Sethi, Hiralal Sethi, Phulchand Sethi, Jethmal Sethi, Devalal Sethi. These families then moved to Dimapur in 1944 due to the Japanese invasion during World War II. These families established the Jain temple in Dimapur in 1947.

== Temples ==
=== Dimapur Jain Temple ===
Dimapur Jain Temple was built in 1947. The temple is architecturally very well built and has an impressive structure. The temple has some intricate glass work. The temple is considered very auspicious by the people of Dimapur. The Moolnayak of the temple is Lord Mahavira. Dimapur is the business center of Nagaland today and most of the Jain families are settled in Dimapur.

=== Kohima Jain Temple ===
The first Jain temple in Nagaland was established in Kohima. The temple was established in 1920

== Community ==
The Dimapur Jain community is involved in various social causes. They regularly organize free health and relief camps. The Dimapur Jain community runs the SD Jain Charitable Hospital, SD Jain High School and SD Jain Girls' college. The SD Jain Hospital and the SD Jain School and Jain Bhavan were established as a result of the untiring efforts of Shri Phulchand Sethi, Shri Phulchand Binaykia, Shri Mangilal Chhabra, Shri Jethmal Sethi, Shri Kanhaiyalal Sethi, Shri Madan Lal Sethi and other Sethi and Chhabra families of Dimapur.

== Population ==
According to 2011 census, the population of Jains in Nagaland is 2,093, which is approximately 0.1% of the total population. 99% of the population is concentrated in the City of Dimapur.

== Gallery ==
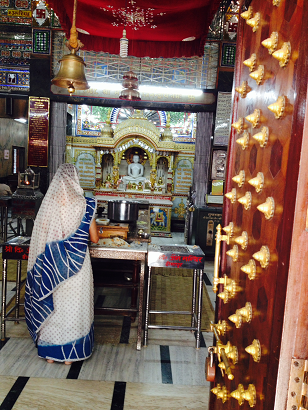
Mulnayak Pratima at Jain Temple, Dimapur

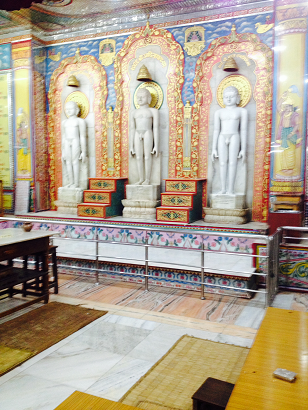
Trimurti at Jain Temple, Dimapur

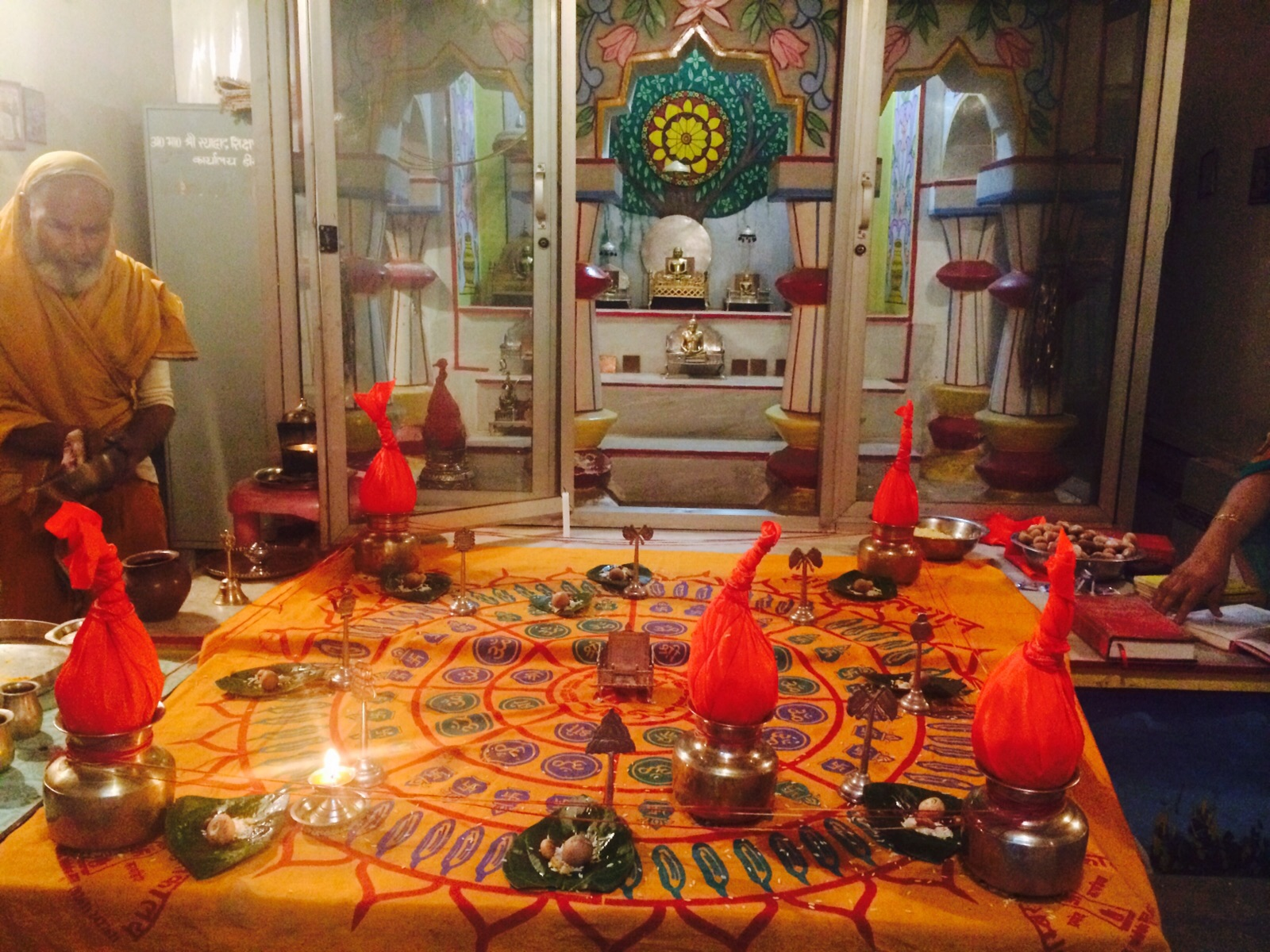
Jain Temple, Kohima

Kohima Jain Temple

== Notable Jain residents ==
- Phulchand Sethi (1911-1976), social worker

== See also ==
- Jainism in India

== Sources ==
- Sethi, Raj Kumar (2021), 100 years of Jainism in Nagaland - (A journey from 1885 to 1985), Walnut Publication, ISBN 978-93-91522-04-9
