= Dimapur Kalibari =

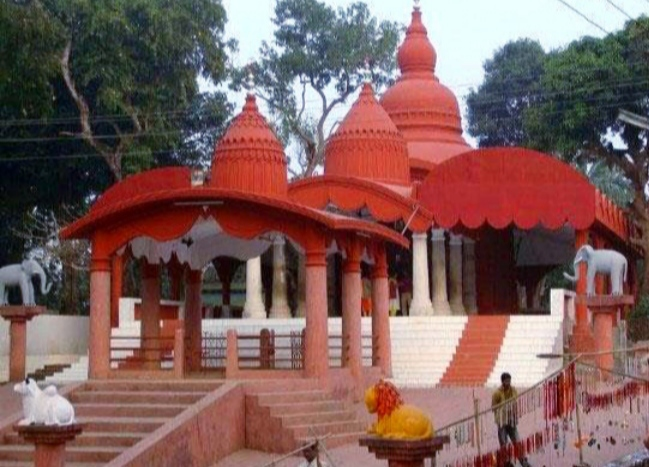
- Dimapur Kalibari Temple

- Location within Nagaland Location within India

Religion
- Affiliation: Hinduism
- District: Dimapur district
- Deity: Kali (Forms of Parvati)
- Festivals: Durga Puja & Kali Puja

Location
- State: Nagaland
- Country: India
- Coordinates: 25.9043°N 93.7253°E

Architecture
- Completed: 1956

Dimapur Kalibari is a temple of the Hindu goddess Kali in the town of Dimapur in Nagaland state of India.

It was built in 1956.

== Gallery ==
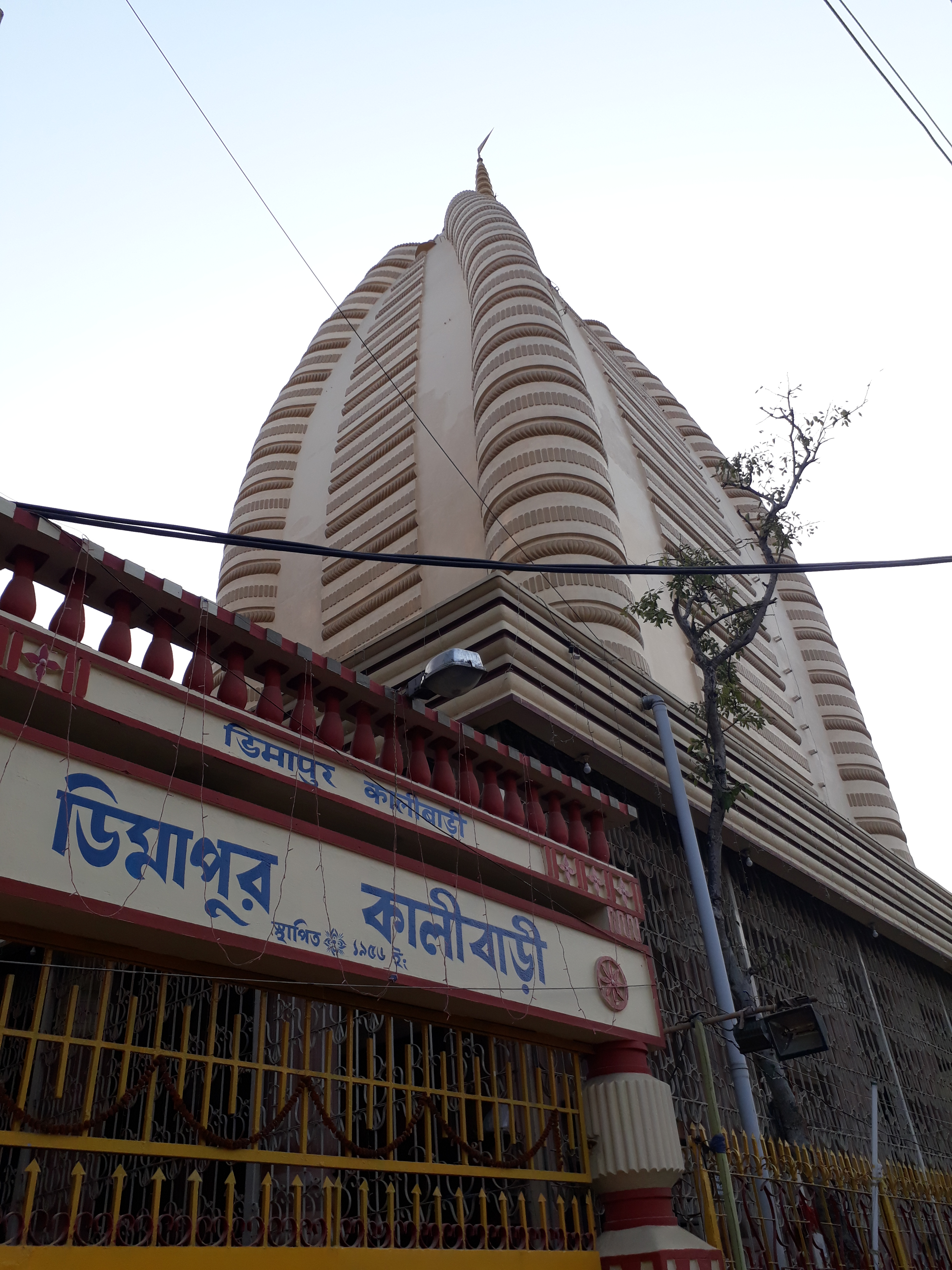
Dimapur Kalibari

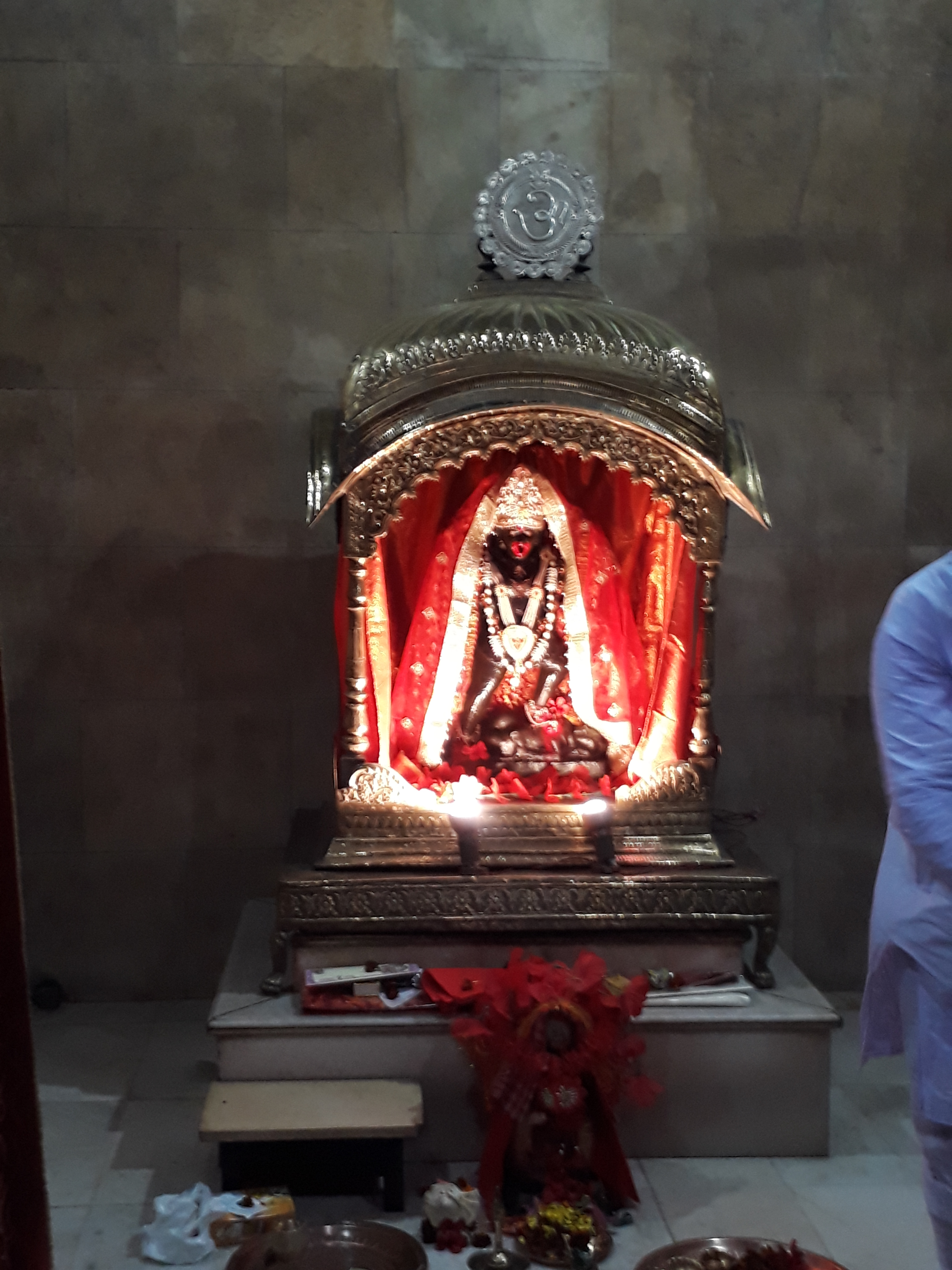
Dimapur Kalibari vigraha (idol)
