= Khonoma =

Khonoma Khwünoria
- Village
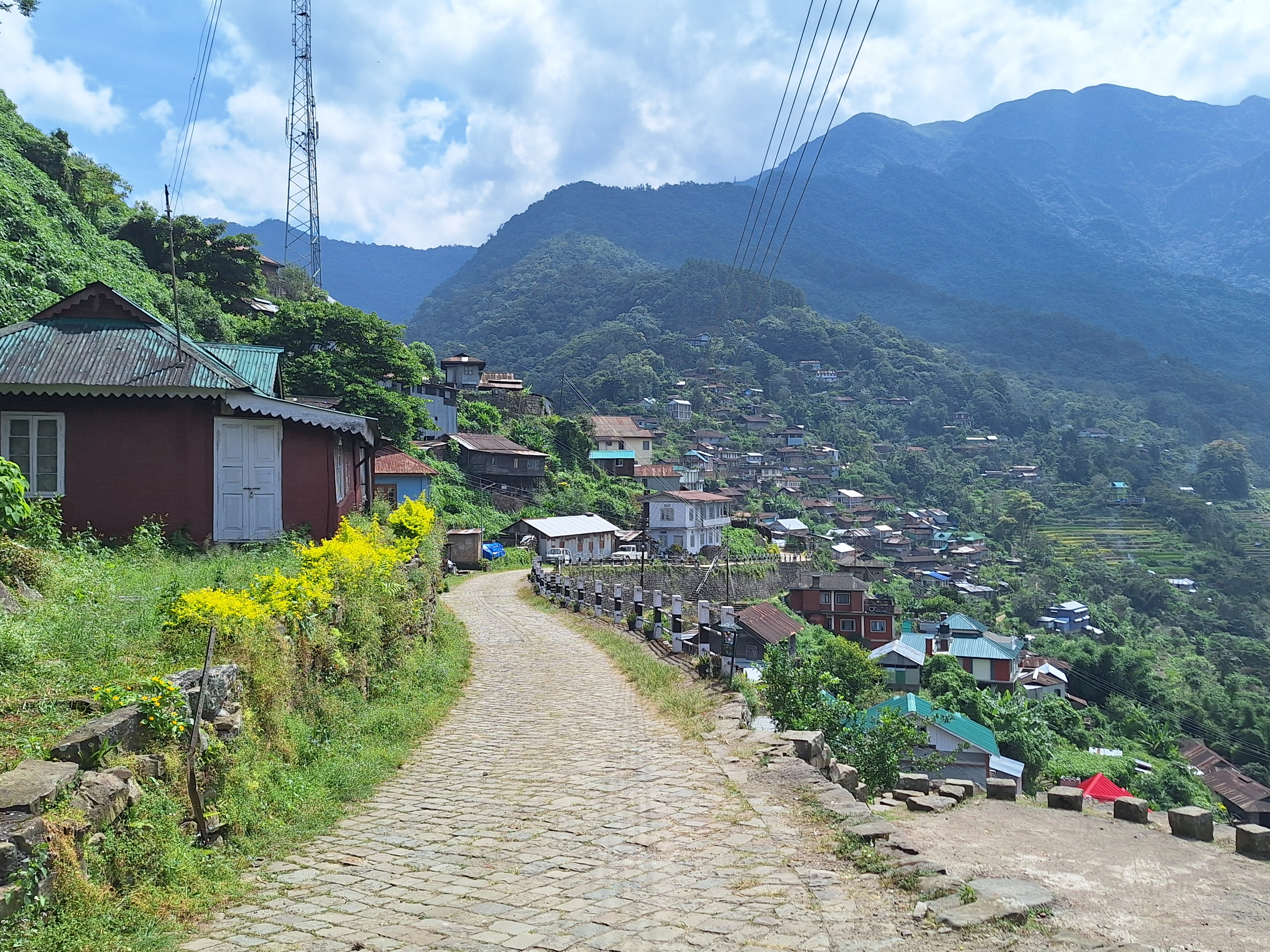
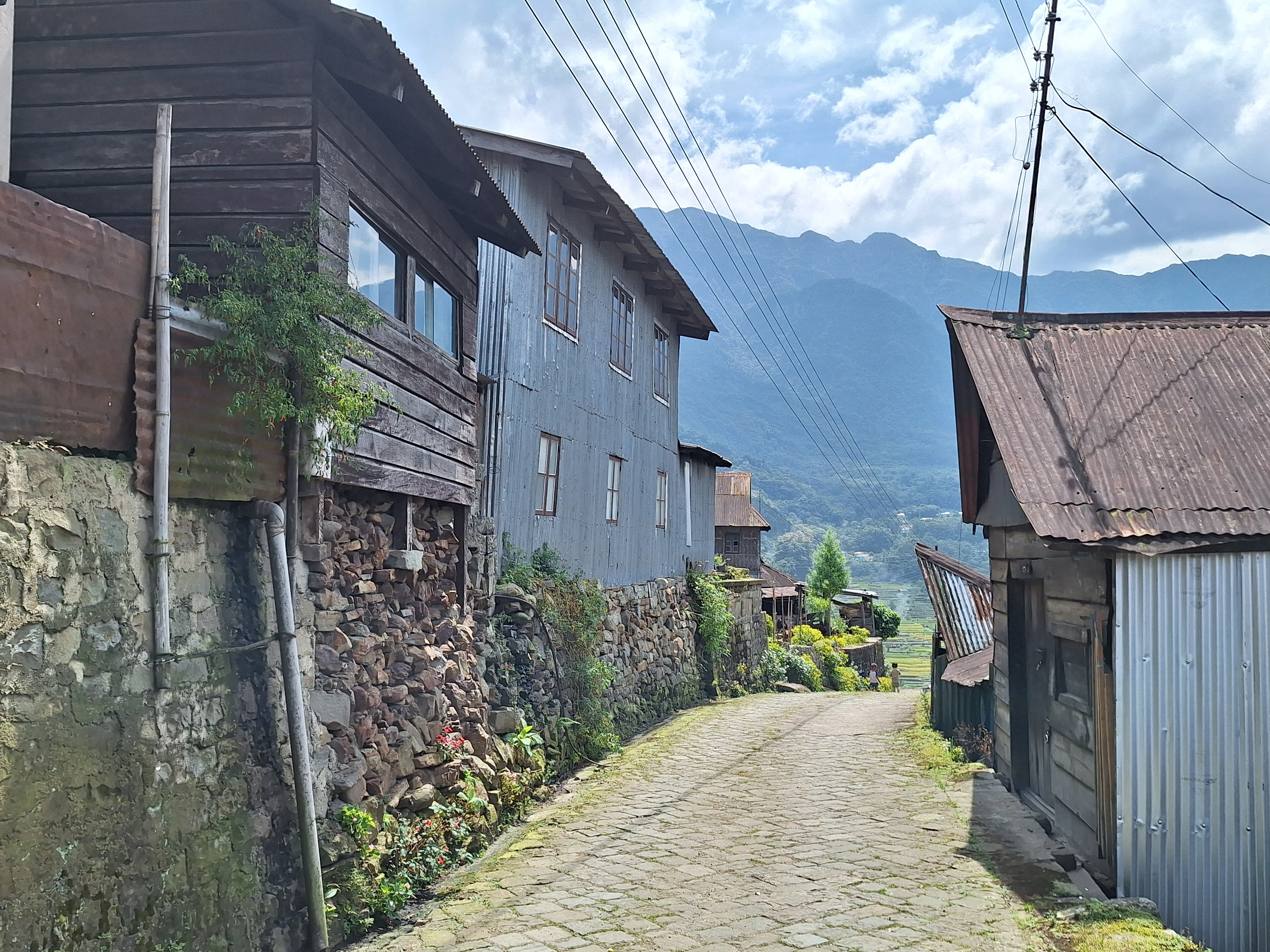
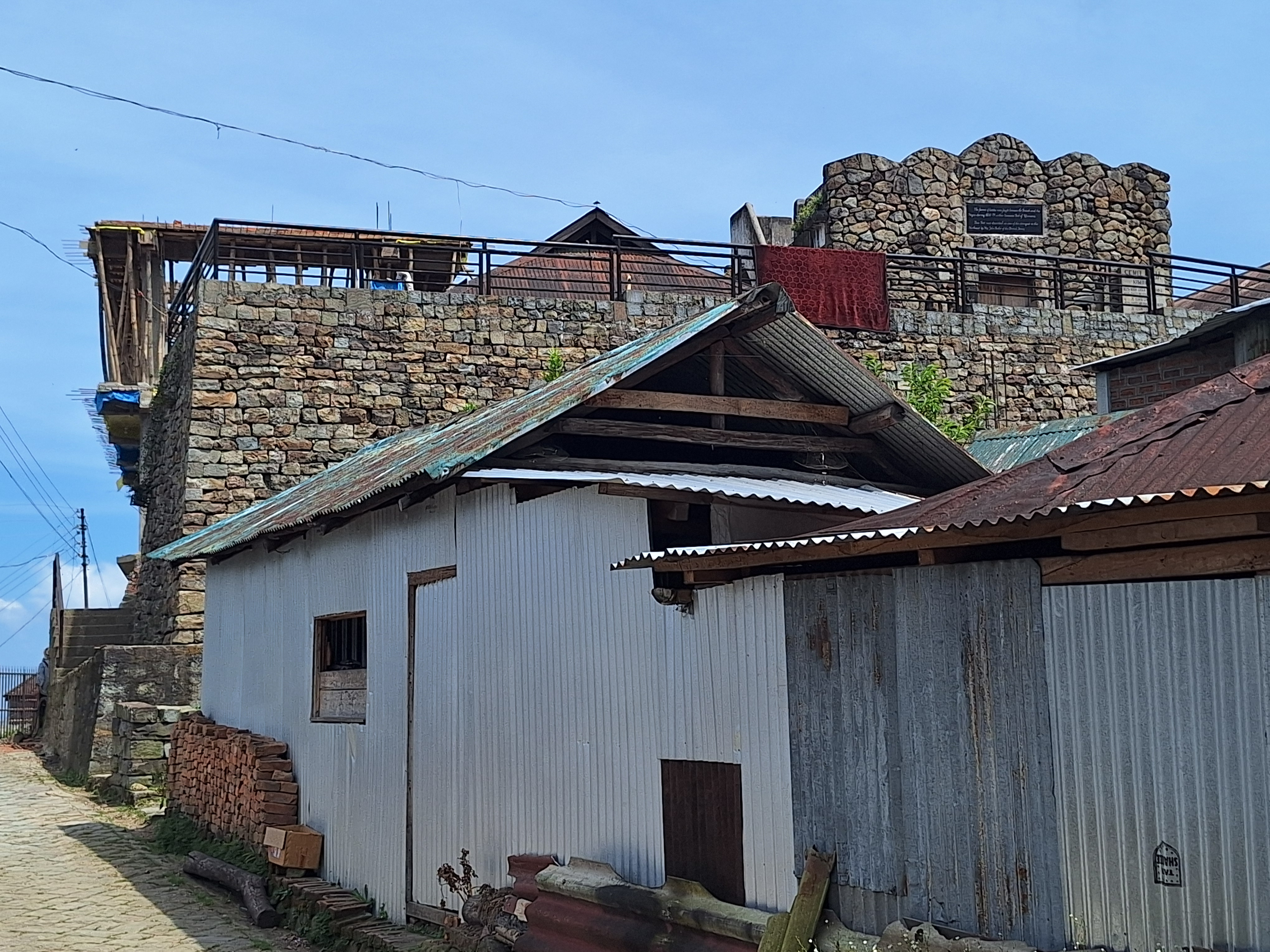
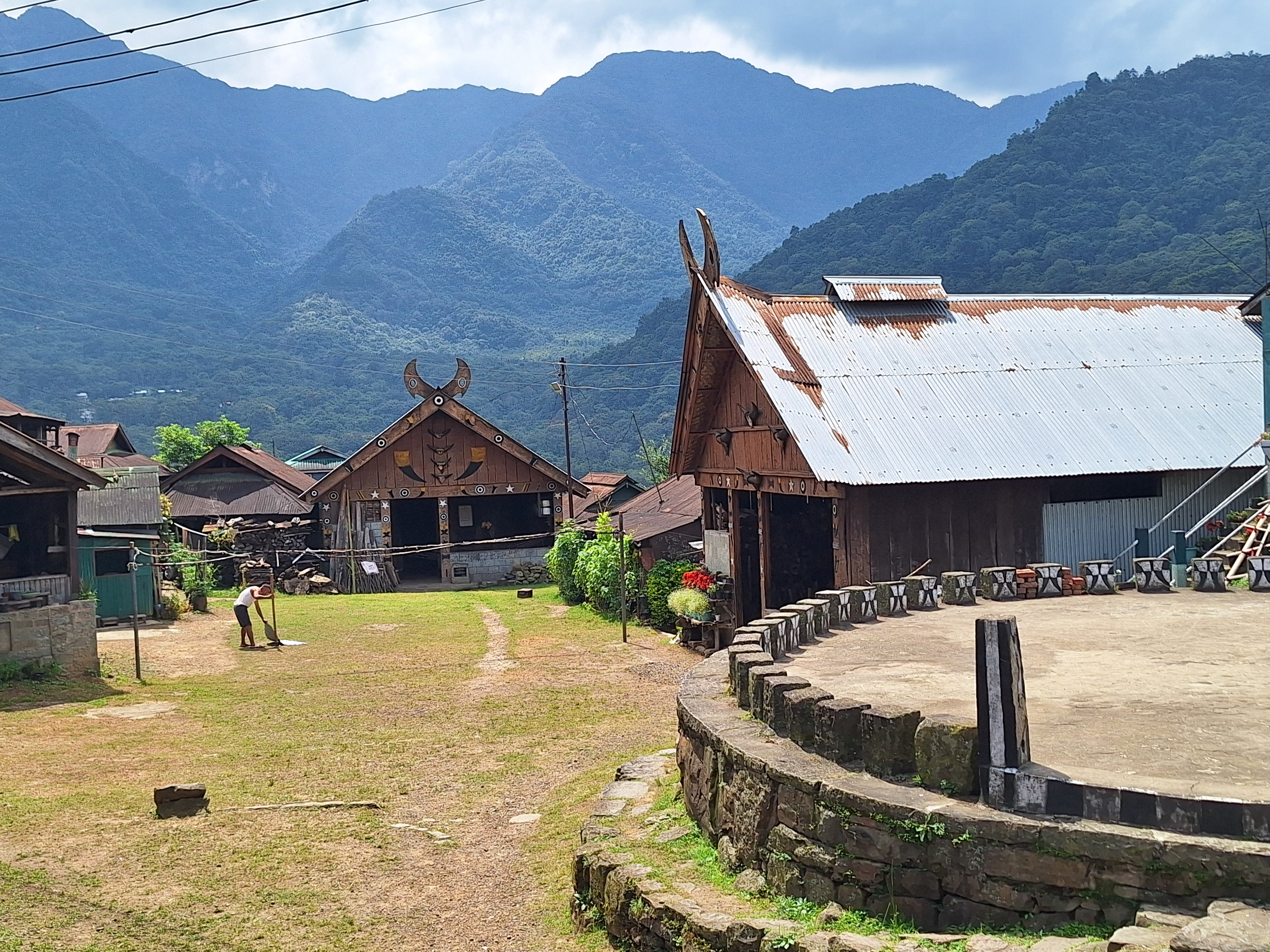
- View of Khonoma Streetscape Khonoma Fort (Semoma) Morungs

- Location of Khonoma Khonoma (India)
- Coordinates: 25.650°N 94.033°E
- Country: India
- Region: Northeast India
- State: Nagaland
- District: Kohima District

Government
  - Type: Village Council
  - Chairman: Ngusa Ratsa
  - Body: Khonoma Village Council
- Elevation: 1,621 m (5,318 ft)

Population (2011)
  - Total: 1,943
  - Dialect: Khwüno
- Time zone: UTC+5:30 (IST)
- PIN: 797002
- Vehicle registration: NL-01
- Sex ratio: 1024 females per 1000 males ♂/♀
- Website: nagaland.nic.in

Khonoma is a Western Angami Naga village located about 20 km west from Kohima, the capital of the Indian state of Nagaland. The village is referred to as Khwüno-ra (named after the Angami term for a local plant, Glouthera fragrantissima). The total population of the village is about 1,943, settled in 424 households. It is the first green village in India and Asia.

== History ==
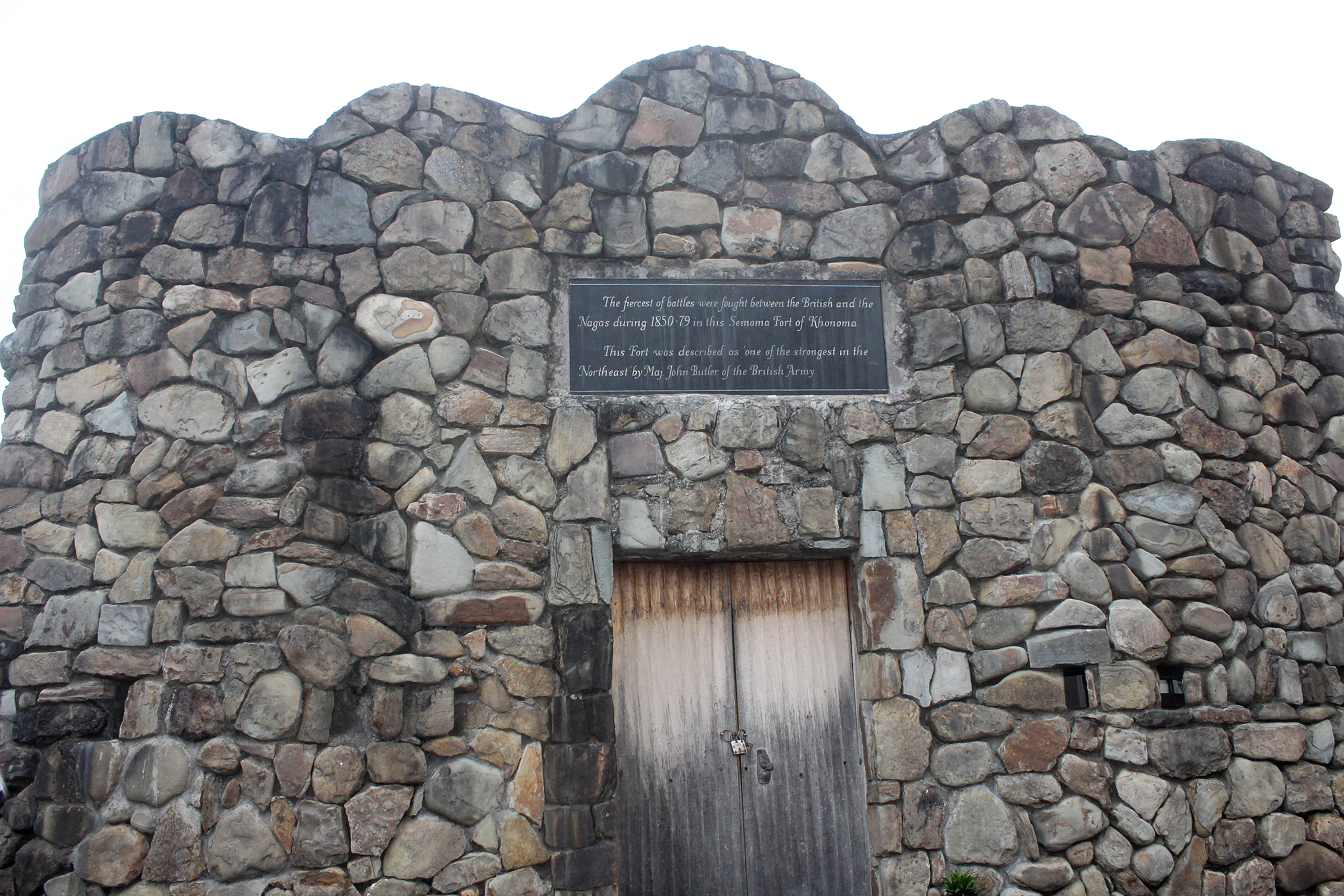
Khonoma Fort, where Angami warriors fought battles against the British

From 1830 to 1880, Angami Naga warriors from Khonoma fought a series of fierce battles against the British to stop them from forced recruitment of Nagas as bonded labourers. On 13 October 1879, Guybon Henry Damant, a political officer of the Naga Hills, led a troop of 87 British soldiers to Khonoma to enforce a tax and the British recruitment of bonded labour. The British troop was ambushed by the Angami warriors on 14 October and in the ensuing battle, 27 British including Damant were killed.

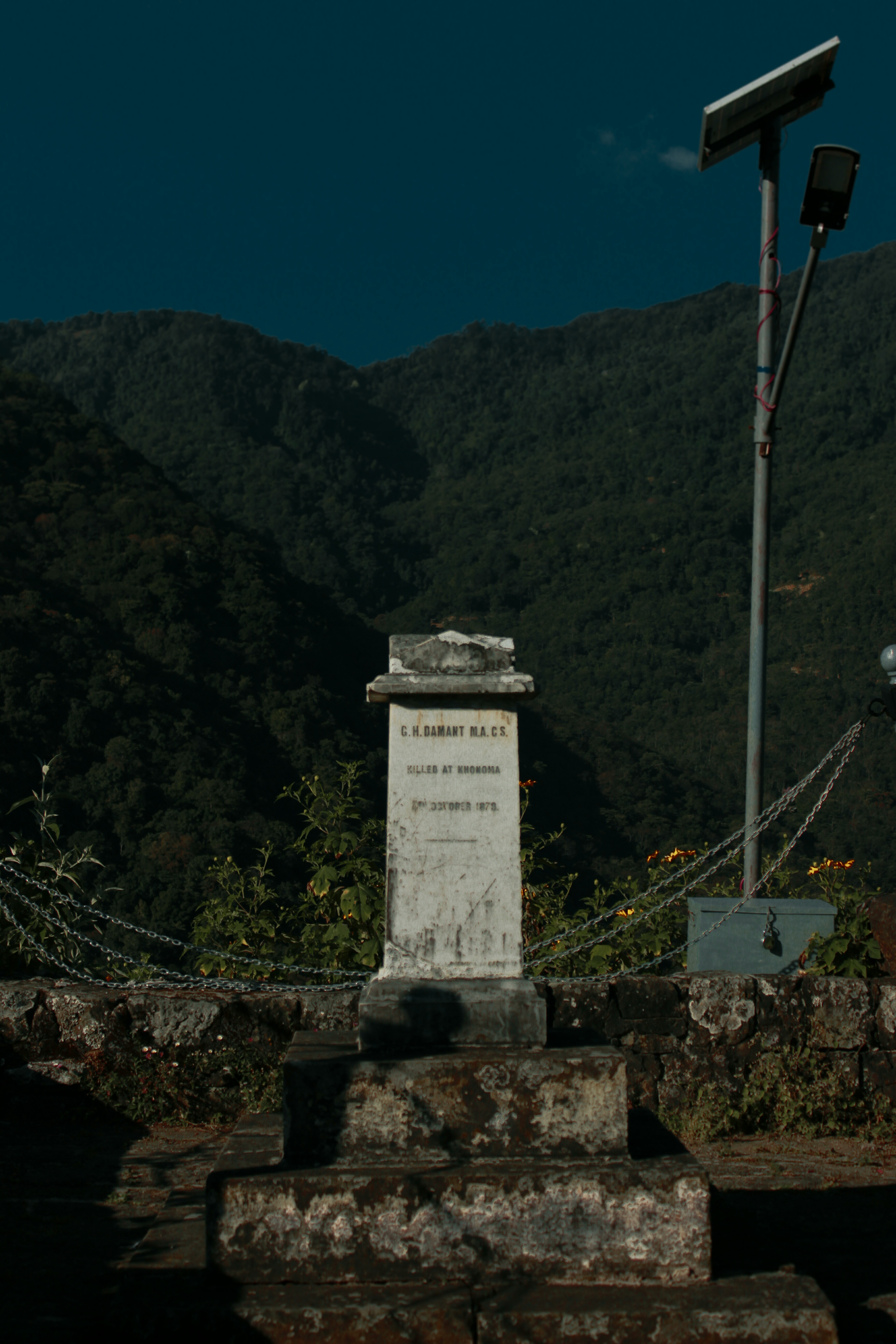
Memorial of Guybon Henry Damant

Thereafter, the British called in reinforcements and laid siege to the tiny village. After holding out for four months, a peace treaty was eventually signed with the British on 27 March 1880. Known as the 'Battle of Khonoma' this was the last organised resistance by the Nagas against the British.

In 1890, the British introduced Christianity, and over a period of time, most of the villagers became Christians.

== Geography ==
The terrain of the village is hilly, ranging from gentle slopes to steep and rugged hillsides. The hills are covered with lush forestland, rich in various species of flora and fauna. The state bird, Blyth's tragopan, a pheasant now nationally endangered, is found here.

== Demographics ==
Khonoma is a medium size village located in Sechü Zubza sub-division of Kohima District, Nagaland with total 424 families residing. The Khonoma village has population of 1943 of which 919 are males while 1024 are females as per Population Census 2011.

The village is divided into three clans (thinuos), namely Merhü-ma (M-Khel), Semo-ma (S-Khel) and Thevo-ma (T-Khel).

Khonoma village has higher literacy rate compared to Nagaland. In 2011, literacy rate of Khonoma village was 83.41% compared to 79.55% of Nagaland. In Khonoma, male literacy stood at 93.72% while female literacy rate was 74.19%.

== Khonoma Nature Conservation and Tragopan Sanctuary ==
In 1998, alarmed after 300 endangered Blyth's tragopans (Tragopan blythii) were killed by the villagers in one week as part of a hunting competition, the village council demarcated a 20 sq km area within which hunting was banned and the Khonoma Nature Conservation and Tragopan Sanctuary (KNCTS) was created. In 2005, due to the successful conservation efforts of the village, the village was named India's first "green village".

== Notable people ==
- Kevichüsa Angami, politician (1903 – 1990)
- Zapu Phizo, leader of Naga National Council (1904 –1990)
- Theyiechüthie Sakhrie, politician (1908 – 1956)
- John Bosco Jasokie, politician (1927 – 2005)
- Razhukhrielie Kevichüsa, bureaucrat and musician (1941 – 2022)
- Chalie Kevichüsa, journalist (1943 – 1992)
- Tubu Kevichüsa, politician (1948 – 1996)

== See also ==
- Dzüleke
