= Kevichüsa Angami =

Indian politician (1903–1990)

Kevichüsa Angami MBE

Member of Parliament, Lok Sabha
- In office 1971–1977
- Preceded by: S. C. Jamir
- Succeeded by: Rano M. Shaiza
- Constituency: Nagaland

Personal details
- Born: Kevichüsa; 15 April 1903 Khonoma, Naga Hills District, North-East Frontier, British India (Now in Kohima District, Nagaland, India)
- Died: 28 December 1990 (aged 87)
- Party: United Front of Nagaland
- Spouse: Germanthangi (Mannie) (m. 1931)
- Children: 10, including Chalie, Razhukhrielie and Tubu
- Relatives: Kevichüsa family

Kevichüsa Nisier Meru MBE (15 April 1903 – 28 December 1990) was an Indian politician and a Member of Parliament, representing Nagaland in the Lok Sabha, the lower house of India's Parliament. He was the first Naga IAS Officer and also the first Naga graduate. Kevichüsa was conferred the Member of the Most Excellent Order of the British Empire (MBE).

== Early life ==
Kevichüsa Nisier Meru was born on 15 April 1903 to an Angami Naga family from Khonoma.

He did his graduation from St. Paul's Cathedral College, Calcutta.

His father Nisier Meru was the first Christian convert from Khonoma. Kevichüsa was educated at Baptist Mission School.

== Political career ==
=== Naga National Council ===
The Naga National Council (NNC) had 29 officially elected members representing their respective tribal councils at its inception. These were elected from various clans or village councils. Kevichüsa was amongst its earliest members. Along with many representatives from the Angami and Zeme tribes, Kevichüsa then endorsed complete independence for the Nagas once the British left. In the NNC meeting held at Wokha in June 1946, he insisted,

Self-government should mean a government of the Nagas, for the Nagas, by the Nagas. Nothing else means anything to the Nagas. We have to be masters of our own country and be free.

After the 1951 plebiscite, Kevichüsa and some of the early leaders of NNC took a step back from their early articulations of self-determination as the movement evolved into a mass movement amidst intensified state repression. Kevichüsa soon resigned from the NNC. John Thomas places these actions amongst certain sections of the 'educated' Naga elites as typical response of national bourgeoise elsewhere.

In the 1969 Nagaland Legislative Assembly election, Kevichüsa stood as the United Front's candidate from Dimapur Town and Dimapur Outer constituencies. He lost in both seats. While Kevichüsa polled 706 votes in the Dimapur Outer constituency, the Naga Nationalist Organisation candidate secured 3186 votes.

=== Member of Parliament ===
In 1971, as a candidate of the United Front of Nagaland, Kevichüsa stood against S. C. Jamir in the Lok Sabha elections. Jamir, then, was the Deputy Minister of Agriculture in the Indira Gandhi government. During the election campaign, Kevichüsa attacked the Naga Nationalist Organisation for its failure to implement the "16 Point Agreement" with the approval of the Indian government. He promised to work towards the negotiation of a new political settlement. Kevichüsa registered an overwhelming victory with 102,596 votes (63.3%) defeating Jamir.

== Personal life ==
Kevichüsa married Germanthangi on 15 October 1931. Together the couple had six daughters and five sons.

== Legacy ==
In 2017, his family-run foundation–The Kevichüsa Foundation–instituted the A. Kevichüsa Citizenship Award to recognise an individual or group from the indigenous community who have 'championed, demonstrated, and embodied' the ideal of citizenship.
