= Khuochiezie =

Public ground in Kohima, Nagaland

- Kohima Local Ground
- Interactive map of Khuochiezie
- Location: Khuochiezie, Kohima, Nagaland, India
- Coordinates: 25.672040°N 94.108240°E
- Capacity: 8000
- Type: Public ground
- Surface: Artificial turf

Construction
- Renovated: 2022

Khuochiezie, commonly known as the Kohima Local Ground, is a multi-purpose public ground located in Kohima, the capital city of the Indian state of Nagaland.

== History ==
On 16 May 1951, the Naga National Council conducted a plebiscite in which Nagas gathered at Khuochiezie to give their thumb impressions in support of Naga independence. The Naga Plebiscite campaign achieved 99.99 percent support for independence.

Renovation for Khuochiezie under Smart Cities Mission began in 2022.

== Sports ==
Khuochiezie is best known as the venue for the Naga Wrestling Championship.

== See also ==
- Indira Gandhi Stadium (Kohima)
