= Phulchand Sethi =

Indian writer

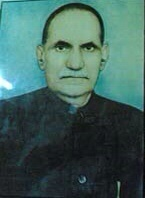
- Born: November 1911; Kohima, Nagaland
- Died: 2 October 1976 (aged 64); Dimapur, Nagaland
- Notable work: Founding father of Nagaland SD Jain Community
- Spouse: Lada Devi Sethi
- Children: 5 sons and 6 daughters

Phulchand Sethi (November 1911 – 2 October 1976) was a social worker, philanthropist and businessman from Dimapur, Nagaland in Northeast India. He was amongst the first proponents of Jainism in Nagaland. He was awarded the Commendation Certificate by the Governor of Nagaland, Lallan Prasad Singh, on 15 August 1975 for Social and Humanitarian activities. In 1959, he established the Dimapur Chamber of Commerce. Sethi could speak many local dialects such as Angami, Sümi, Lotha, Kuki, Manipuri and Assamese. He died on 2 October 1976 in Dimapur.

== Early life and education ==
Phulchand Sethi was born in November 1911, in Kohima, Nagaland to Hardev Sethi. He was schooled at Digambar Jain M. E. School (Kohima) in Nagahills, an institution of which he was later the secretary between 1928-1940.

Sethi married Lada Devi Sethi in 1935, a well-known personality of the Jain community, and with her had five sons and six daughters. His sons and daughters have all held various important positions in the Digambar Jain Mahasabha and Jain Communities across India.

Along with his family, Sethi left Kohima in 1944 due to Japanese invasion during World War II. They moved to Dimapur, Nagaland. His father along with his brothers had come from Chhapra, Rajsathan to Kohima in the 1880s. They were the first non-Naga settlers in Nagaland.

== Career highlights ==
Sethi successfully promoted and managed diversified businesses. He was the secretary of the Digambar Jain M. E. School (Kohima). He was the President of the Kohima Marwari Sammelan and founded the Shree Digambar Jain Temple in Dimapur in 1944. He was the first Secretary (Maha Mantri) of Shree Digambar Jain Samaj Dimapur and continued in the post until 1976. He set up the Shree Digambar Jain School Dimapur in 1947 and also Dimapur Chamber of Commerce in 1959. He founded the Jain Mahavir Charitable Hospital Dimapur in 1975, the first charitable hospital in Nagaland. He also established the SD Jain Kirthi Stumbh in 1974, a very famous landmark in Dimapur. He was the first President of Multi-purpose Co-operative Society. He was also the founding Treasurer of Dimapur College of Arts & Commerce. He was the first Secretary of Durga Mandir Dimapur. He became the first non Naga nominated Member of Dimapur Town Committee in 1960. He was appointed Member of Railway Consultant Committee & Central Excise Advisory Committee by the government of India. He was also the Secretary of the first ever Jain Temple in Nagaland which was built in 1920 in Kohima.

== Gallery ==
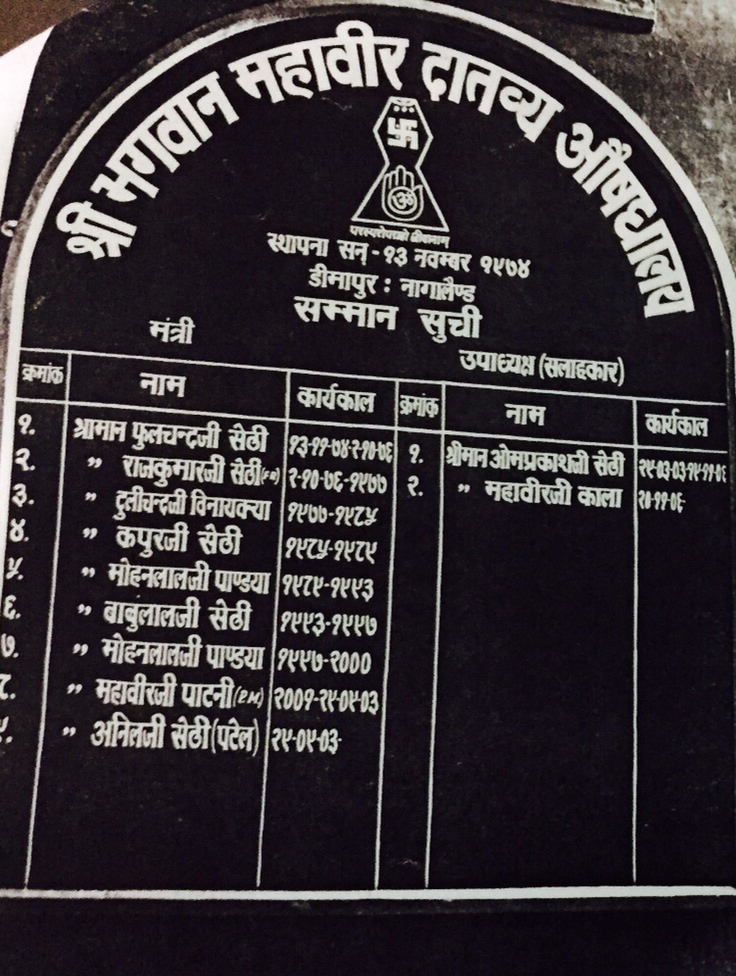
The names of the secretaries of the SD Jain Charitable Hospital in chronological order

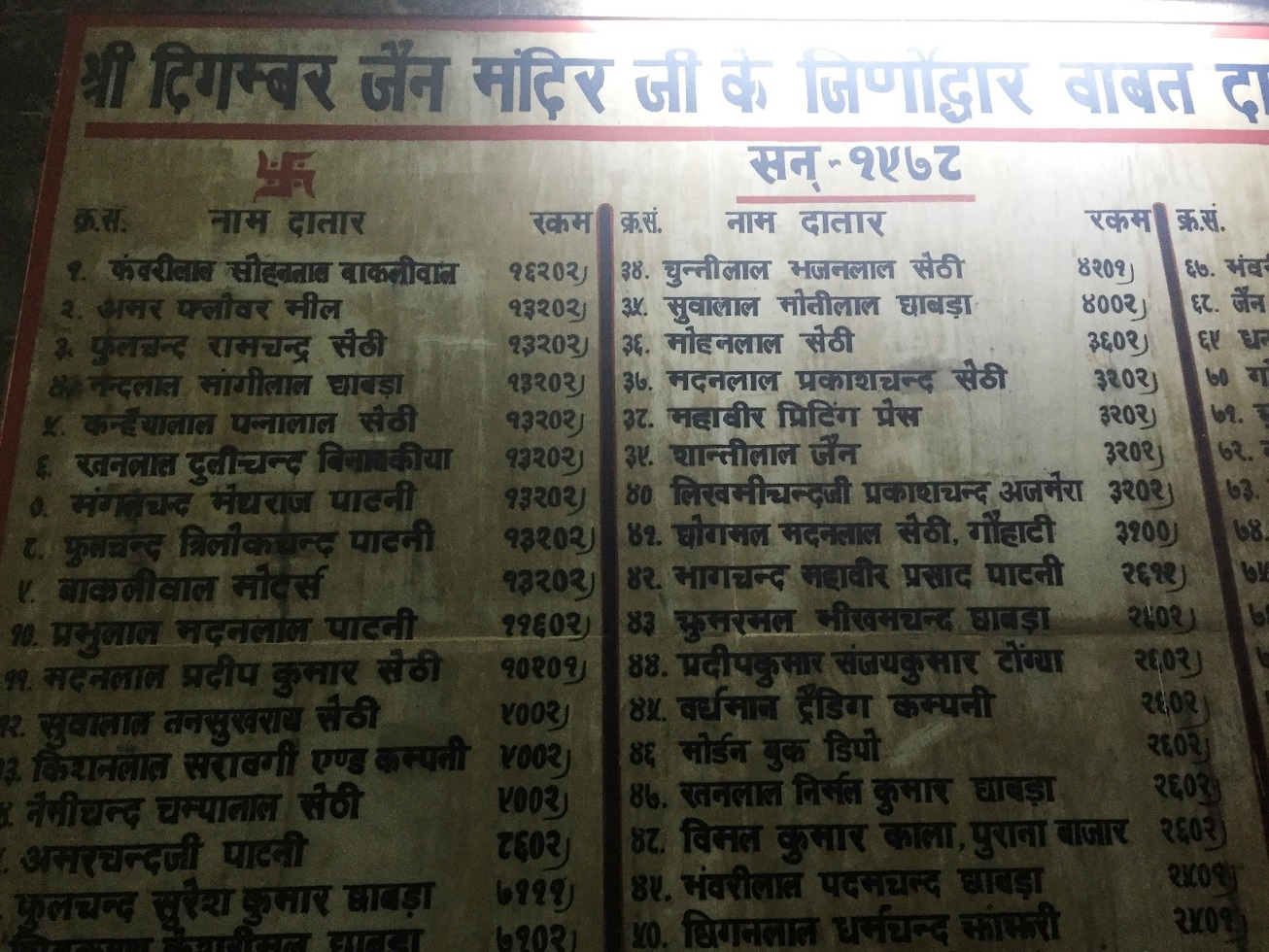
The Original list of Donor's of Jain Temple Dimapur

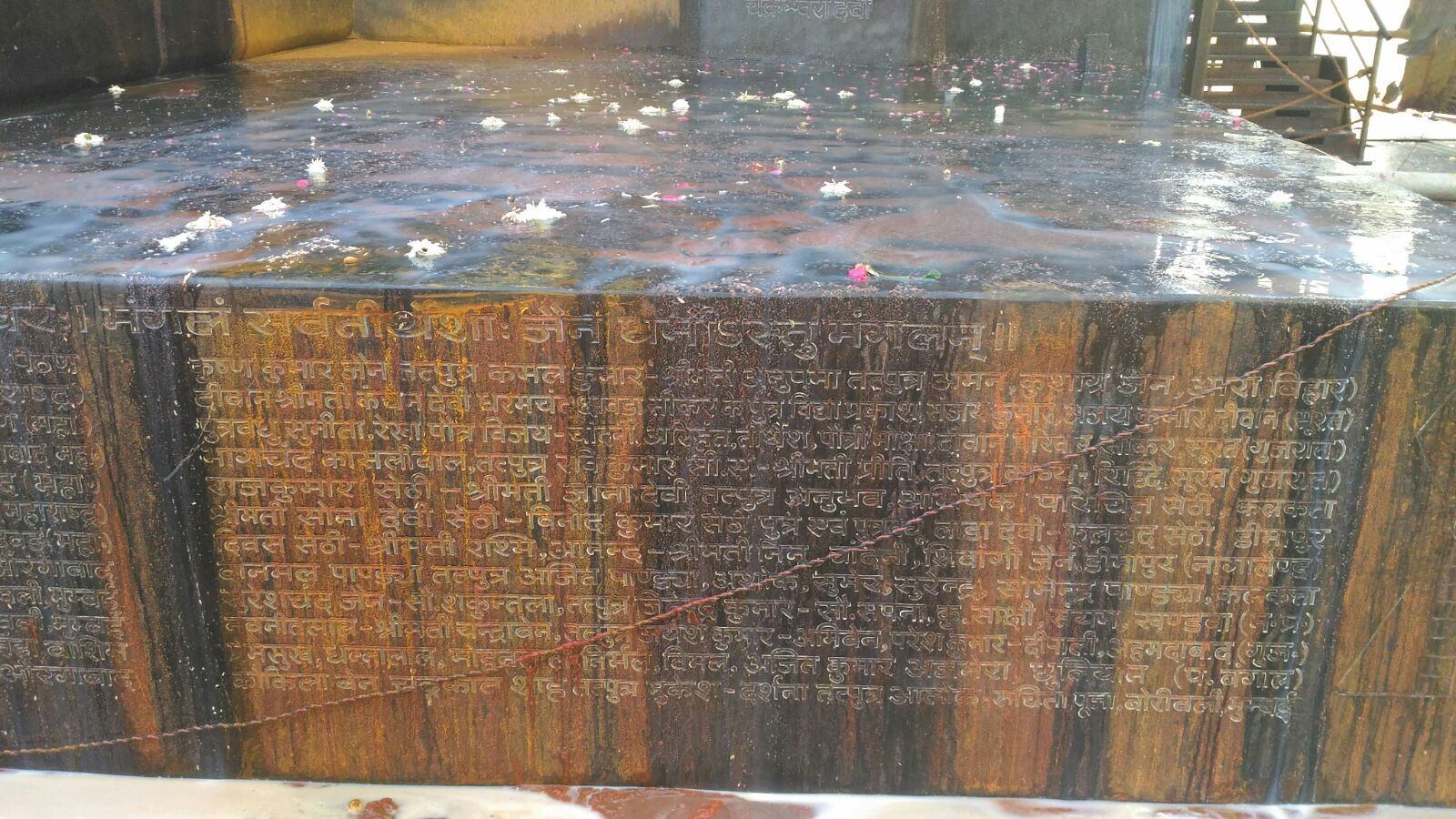
The Pedestal of Statue of Ahimsa, Mangi Tungi

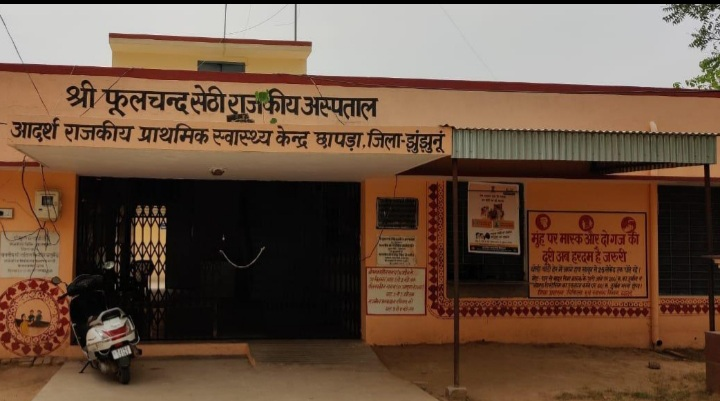
Shri Phulchand Sethi State Hospital Chhapra, Jhunjhunu, Rajasthan

== See also ==
- Bhagwan Vasupujya Pratima Champapur
- Jainism in Nagaland
