= Naga Plebiscite =

1951 political plebiscite organized by the Naga National Council

- Date: 16 May 1951; 75 years ago
- Location: Khuochiezie, Kohima (Now in Nagaland, India)
- Organized by: Naga National Council (NNC)
- Participants: Nagas
- Outcome: Claimed 99.9% support for Naga independence

The Naga Plebiscite was a political plebiscite conducted on 16 May 1951 by the Naga National Council (NNC) under the leadership of A. Z. Phizo. Its purpose was to determine whether the Naga people supported sovereignty and independence from the Republic of India. Over 99.9% of participants voted in favor of independence through thumb impressions and signatures. The Government of India however did not recognize the plebiscite and rejected its legitimacy.

== Background ==
The origins of the plebiscite lie in the emergence of Naga political nationalism during the late British colonial period. The Naga National Council was founded in 1946 to represent Naga political aspirations. Prior to Indian independence, the Naga Club submitted a memorandum asserting that Nagas should be allowed to determine their own political future.

On 14 August 1947, one day before Indian independence, the Naga declared Naga independence. Continued disagreements with the Government of India over sovereignty led the NNC to organize a plebiscite in 1951.

== Procedure ==
Thumb impression being recorded during the Naga Plebiscite

The plebiscite was held on 16 May 1951 at Khuochiezie (Kohima Local Ground). Rather than a secret ballot, participation was recorded through thumb impressions and signed affirmations collected by NNC volunteers.

According to the NNC, nearly all eligible Nagas of both sexes and above the age of 16 (those born before 1935), participated and 99.9% endorsed independence. The methodology of the plebiscite has been critiqued.

== Impact ==
The Government of India rejected the plebiscite results and continued to regard the Naga Hills as part of India. The failure to achieve recognition contributed to escalating tensions, eventually leading to armed insurgency and the formation of later nationalist groups such as the National Socialist Council of Nagalim (NSCN).

For many Naga nationalist organizations, the plebiscite remains a symbolic and political basis for claims to self-determination. Annual commemorations of Naga Plebiscite Day are observed on 16 May in Naga-inhabited regions.

== See also ==
- Naga conflict
- Insurgency in Northeast India
