= Dimapur =

- City and municipality
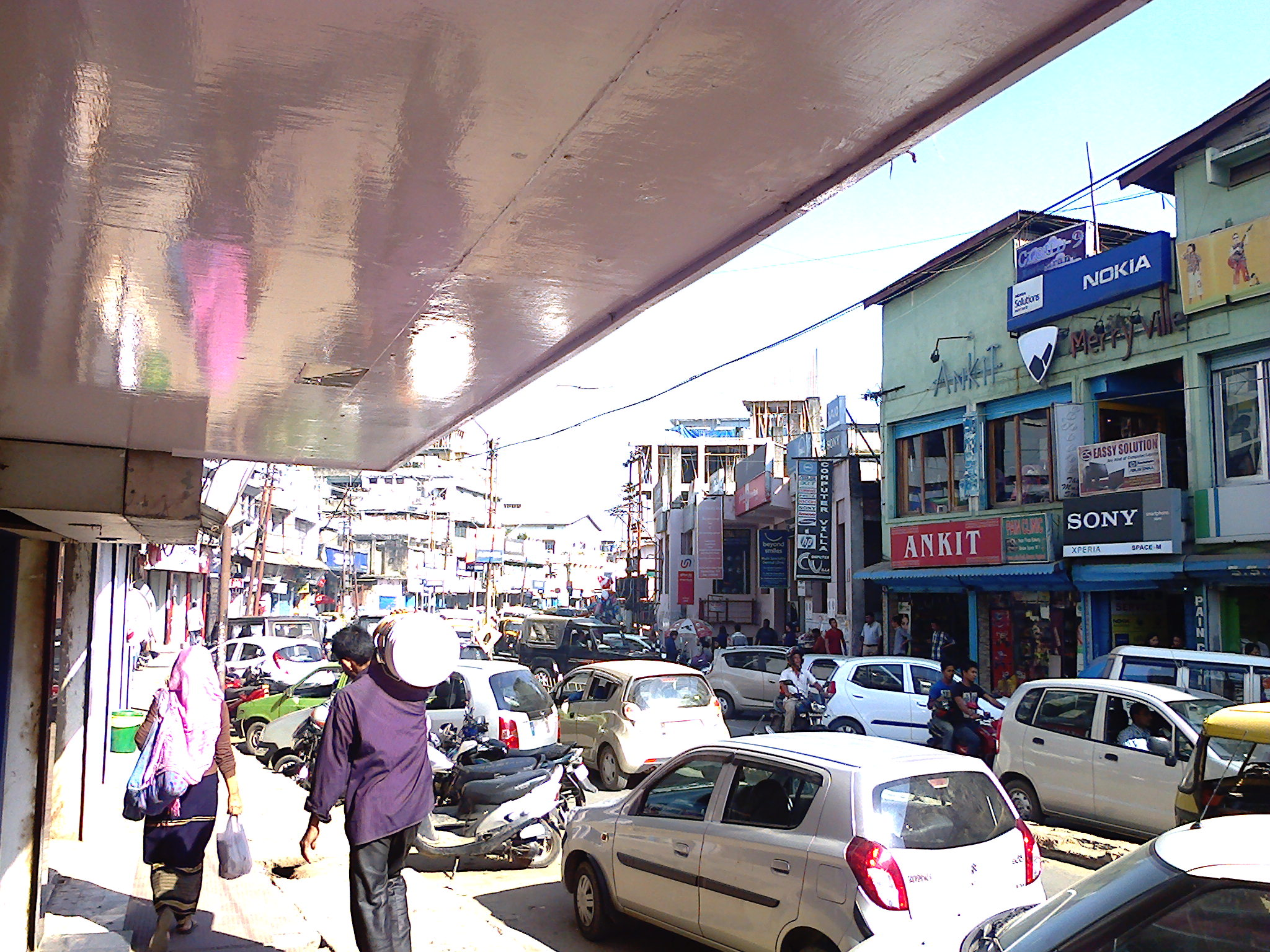
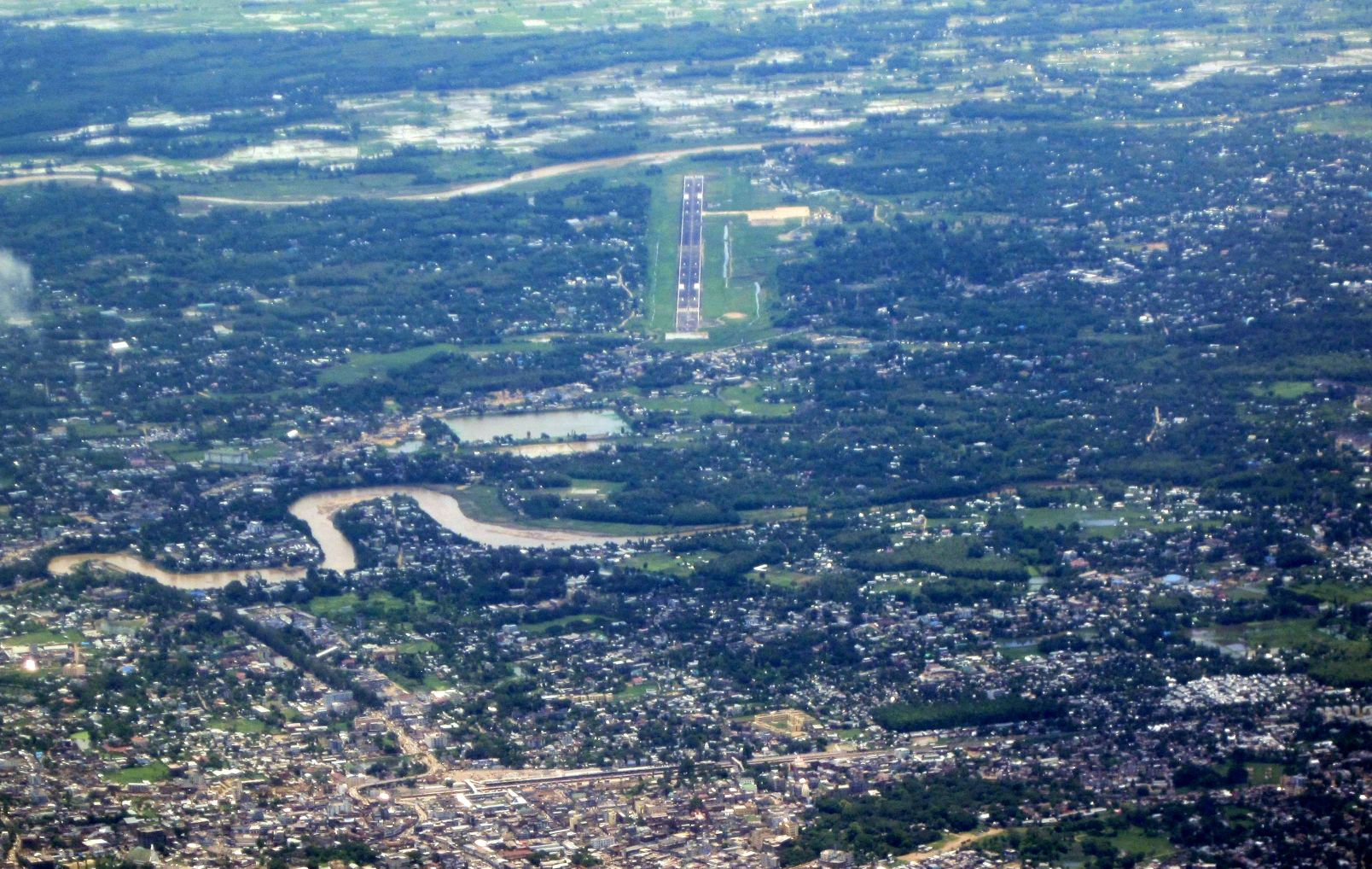
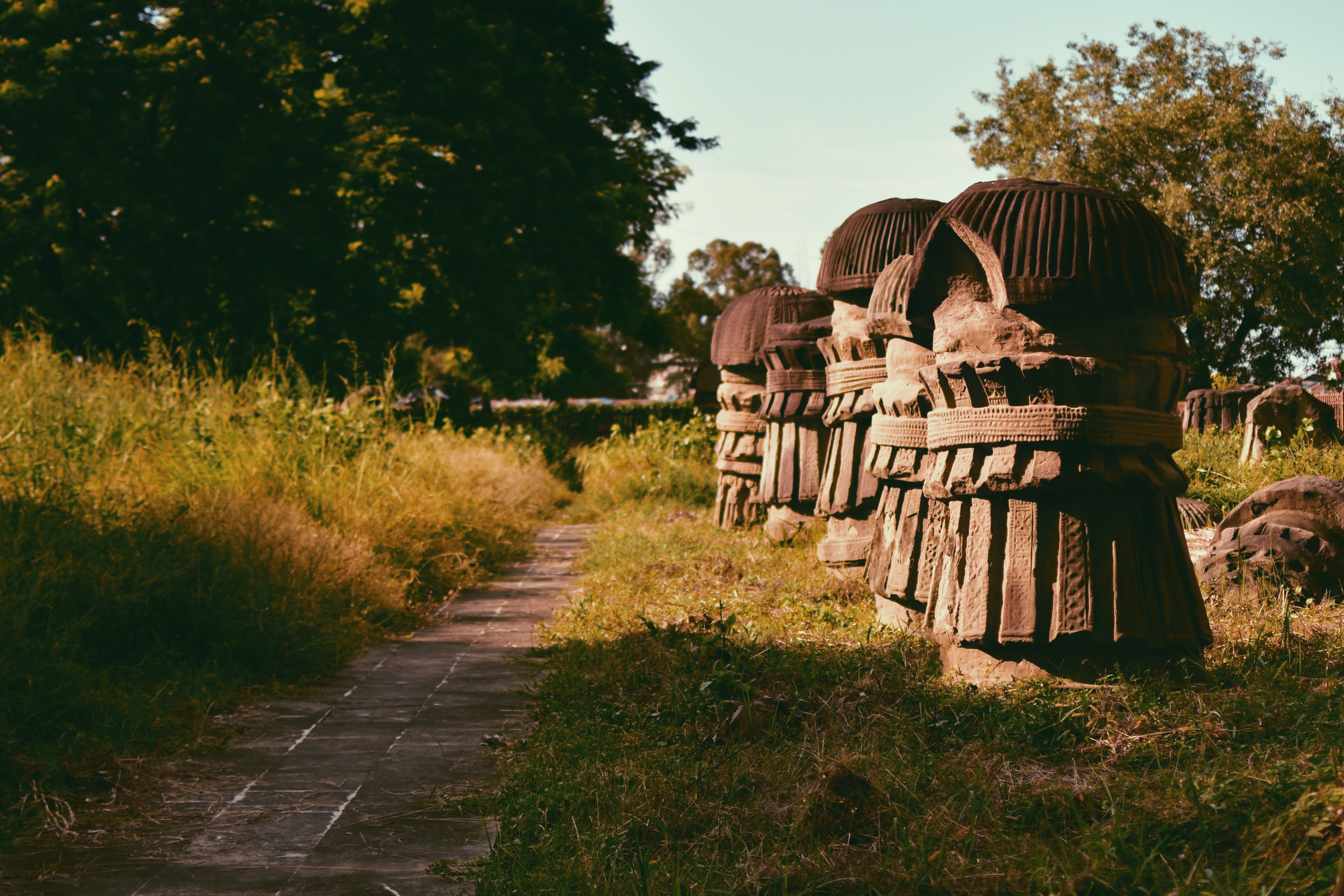
- From Top (Clockwise): Dimapur street; Aerial view of Dimapur; Ruins of Kachari Rajbari;
- Interactive map of Dimapur
- Location of Dimapur in Nagaland Dimapur (India)
- Coordinates: 25.909174°N 93.726602°E
- Country: India
- State: Nagaland
- District: Dimapur

Government
  - Type: Municipality
  - Body: Dimapur Municipal Council
  - Chairperson: Hukheto Yepthomi (Naga People's Front)
  - Deputy Chairperson: Imlinaro Stephanie Ezüng (Naga People's Front)
  - Police Commissioner: Kevithuto Sophie, IPS

Area
  - City and municipality: 18.13 km^{2} (7.00 sq mi)
  - Metro: 70 km^{2} (27 sq mi)
- Elevation: 145 m (476 ft)

Population
  - City and municipality: 122,834
  - Rank: 1st in Nagaland

Languages
  - Official: English
  - Other major spoken languages: Angami; Ao; Chakhesang; Lotha; Nagamese; Sümi; Zeliang
- Time zone: UTC+5:30 (IST)
- Telephone code: 91 - (0) 03862
- Vehicle registration: NL-07
- Website: dimapur.nic.in

Dimapur (/diməˈpʊər/) is the largest city and municipality in the Indian state of Nagaland. As of 2024, the municipality had a population of 172,000. The city is the main gateway and commercial centre of Nagaland. It is located near the border with Assam, along the banks of the Dhansiri River. Its main railway station is the second busiest station in Northeast India. It was an important logistics and supply hub for the Allied forces during the Second World War.

== Etymology ==
Many historians explain the name 'Dimapur' as the city of the Dimasa people. The compound word is derived from the Dimasa Kachari words: di (water), ma (big), and pur (settlement).

In the Ahom Buranjis, Dimapur is referred to sometimes as Che-din-chi-pen (town-earth-burn-make) meaning "Brick-town" and its rulers as khun timisa (distorted word for Dimasa).

== History ==
Situated on the banks of the Dhansiri (originally known as Dong-siri meaning a ravine of peaceful habitation), Dimapur was described as the 'Brick City' by the European scholars and by the Ahoms.

=== Medieval period ===
==== Capital of the Kachari Kingdom ====
In the 13th century, the city was the capital of the Dimasa Kingdom. In the heart of the city there is an old relic of the Dimasa Kingdom which speaks about the once prosperous era.

The city of Dimapur is said to have been founded by a Kachari king Mahamanipha (1330-1370) and it remained as the capital of the Kacharis until it was captured by the Ahom ruler Suhungmung in 1526 A.D.

==== With the Ming dynasty and kingdom of Ava (1400–1500) ====
Dimapur under the kingdom of Mong Mao (yellow) in the heyday of the Si Kefa period (1360)

It appears that Chinese Ming dynasty had political contacts with the Dimasa and other neighbouring kingdoms between 1406 and 1439. The Ming dynasty canonised the Dimasa kingdom as a tusi in 1406. A Pacification superintendency was established in the Dimasa kingdom and Lawangpa was appointed as the Di-ma-sa Pacification Superintendent. The Ming court sent Zhou Rang, a Supervising Secretary to bestow Imperial orders, patent, seals, paper money, silks etc. to the kingdom and in return, the chieftain of Dimasa sent horses and local products as a sign of tribute. In 1425, paper money, ramie-silks, silk gauzes and thin silk were conferred to Mazhiasa who was sent to the Ming court by Diedaomangpa, the acting head of Di-ma-sa Pacification Superintendency.

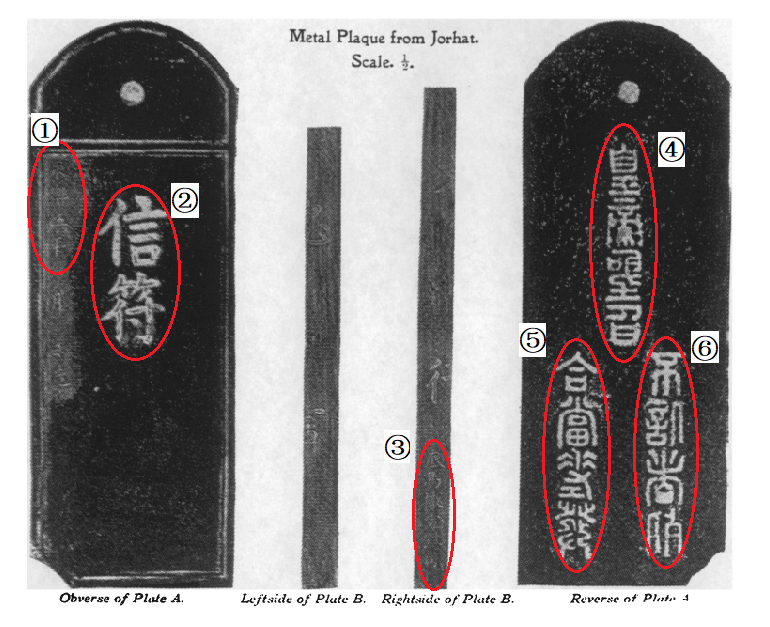
Chinese plate for Dimasa of the era of Emperor Yong-le (1407 AD.) (Note: Plate was discovered in Jorhat Assam from Ahom royal family. ① 永樂五年: Yong-le emperor 5 years: 1407 AD. ② 信符: Plate. ③ 底馬撒宣慰司: Di-ma-sa Xuanwei Si ④ 皇帝聖旨: Imperial edict ⑤ 合當差發: “合當” means must or should, "差發" is a commercial form in the early Ming dynasty that frontier ethnic groups or tribes exchange horses for tea with Ming officials. "合當差發" could be understood as if you have this plate then you can exchange horses for tea with a Ming official. The Ming dynasty prohibits the folk tea trade with frontier ethnics and tribes. "合當差發" is the only way they can get tea from Ming. ⑥ 不信者斬: If somebody does not comply, he should be killed.)

It is speculated that Dimasa kingdom is referred to as Timmasala in the Yan-anng-myin pagoda inscription of Burma in 1400 A.D. In this inscription by Minkhaung I, the kingdom of Ava is said to extend on the east to Shan Pyi, northwest to Timmasala, west to Kula Pyi, and south to Talaing Pyi.

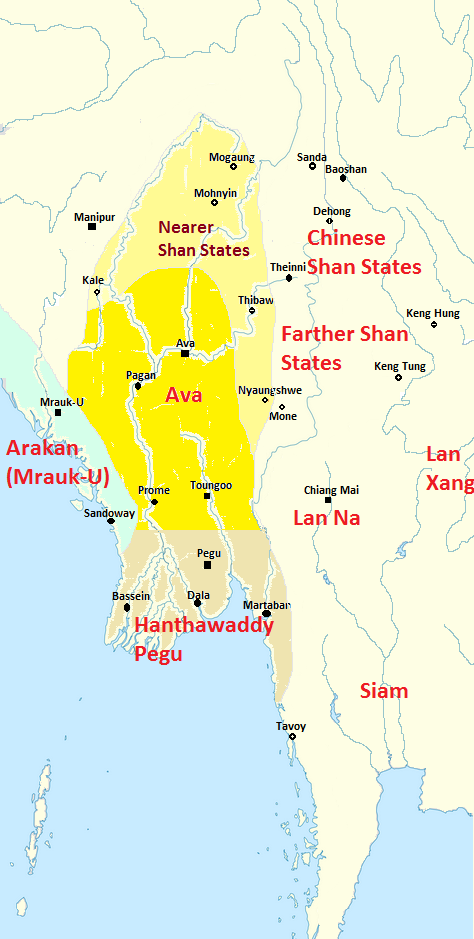
Ava in 1400s

In a 1442 inscription from Pagan of Burma mentions Timmasala (Hill Kacharis) to be one of the 21 principalities under Mong Mao ruler Thonganbwa (1413–1445/6), who was later captured by the Governor of Taungdwin and presented to King Narapati I of Ava.

The ruins of Dimasa Kingdom in Dimapur include a brick wall of the length of nearly 2 miles and 2 tanks about 300 yards square, are indicative of a city of considerable size.

=== 19th century Sanskritisation ===
During the early 19th century, the Dimasa chiefs with the assistance of Brahmins claimed themselves to be descendent of Hidimba. According to the legend constructed in the court, during their exile, the Pandavas came to the Kachari Kingdom where Bhima fell in love with Hidimbi (sister of Hidimba). Bhima married princess Hidimbi according to the Gandharva system and a son was born to princess Hidimbi, named Ghatotkacha. He ruled the Kachari Kingdom for many decades. Thereafter, kings of his lineage ruled over the vast land of the "Dilao" river ( which translates to "long river" in English), now known as Brahmaputra River for centuries until 4th century AD.

=== 20th century ===
==== World War II ====
During World War II, Dimapur was the centre of action between British India and Imperial Japan. It was the staging post for the Allied offensive. The Japanese could reach Kohima where a siege was laid. Allied reinforcement came through Dimapur by rail and road for the push against the Japanese. An airport at Dimapur was also in use for supplies to the allied forces in Burma. The Battle of Kohima about 77 km from Dimapur is considered the turning point for the Japanese retreat from Southeast Asia.

William Slim in his Defeat into Victory mentions that three all-weather roads were prepared by the Allied forces during World War II: Ledo Road in the north:Central Front road from Dimapur to Imphal; and a southern road from Dohazari to Arakan(Even though a road from Dimapur from Imphal already existed, a new road was made in 1942-43 with assistance from the pioneers of The 7th Battalion Worcestershire Regiment). Out of these, the Dimapur- Imphal Road proved to be the most critical as the events unfolded.

==== Assam lease Dimapur to Nagaland ====
In 1918, Dimapur was leased to then Naga Hills District (Now Nagaland) by then erstwhile Assam Province of British of India for 30 years for construction of Railways lines (unclear from which district). In 1963, it was again leased to now state of Nagaland for 99 years. There is controversy surrounding this claim, as both state governments have not come forward to comment on the matter.

=== 21st century ===
==== 2004 Dimapur bombings ====
On 2 October 2004, two powerful bombs were set off—one at the Dimapur Railway Station and the other at the Hong Kong Market killing 30 and injuring over 100 others.

== Geography ==
Dimapur is located in the southwest of Nagaland. The vast majority of this area is flat with the Dhansiri River, a tributary of the Brahmaputra River flowing east of the city.

=== Climate ===
Dimapur is hot and humid in summers and moderately cold in winters.

Climate data for Dimapur
Month	Jan	Feb	Mar	Apr	May	Jun	Jul	Aug	Sep	Oct	Nov	Dec	Year
Mean daily maximum °C (°F)	21.3 (70.3)	24.0 (75.2)	27.5 (81.5)	28.5 (83.3)	29.2 (84.6)	29.7 (85.5)	29.5 (85.1)	29.4 (84.9)	28.9 (84.0)	27.3 (81.1)	24.8 (76.6)	22.0 (71.6)	26.8 (80.3)
Mean daily minimum °C (°F)	10.6 (51.1)	12.6 (54.7)	15.6 (60.1)	18.7 (65.7)	21.4 (70.5)	22.9 (73.2)	24.3 (75.7)	24.1 (75.4)	23.1 (73.6)	20.0 (68.0)	15.5 (59.9)	12.0 (53.6)	18.4 (65.1)
Average precipitation mm (inches)	24 (0.9)	45 (1.8)	96 (3.8)	214 (8.4)	241 (9.5)	259 (10.2)	247 (9.7)	239 (9.4)	199 (7.8)	105 (4.1)	26 (1.0)	15 (0.6)	1,710 (67.2)
Average rainy days	4	5	7	12	17	17	17	18	16	10	3	2	128
Average relative humidity (%)	78	72	66	76	82	84	85	85	86	85	81	80	80

Dimapur has been ranked 28th best “National Clean Air City” under (Category 3 population under 3 lakhs cities) in India.

== Demographics ==
According to the 2011 census, the city-population of the old Town Committee area (up to the old dhansiri bridge) at 122,834. Males constitute 52% of the population and females 48%. Dimapur has an average literacy rate of 86% male literacy is 88% and, female literacy is 84%. In Dimapur, 12% of the population is under 6 years of age. Unlike other places in the state, this city has a heterogeneous mix of people from all over India, and for which it is also known as "Mini India".

=== Religion ===
Religions in Dimapur City (2011)
Religion	Percent
Christianity	45.10%
Hinduism	41.11%
Islam	11.21%
Jainism	1.73%
Other or not stated	0.85%

Christianity is the most followed religion in the city making up 45.10% of the city's population, closely followed by Hinduism at 41.11%. Islam is followed by 11.21%, Jainism by 1.73%, Buddhist by 0.48% and Sikhs by 0.19% respectively.

Languages in Dimapur City
1. Bengali (25.5%)
2. Hindi (18.7%)
3. Ao (14.3%)
4. Lotha (6.52%)
5. Nepali (3.76%)
6. Angami (2.45%)
7. Manipuri (2.30%)
8. Zeliang (2.11%)
9. Assamese (2.01%)
10. Sema (1.91%)
11. Kabui (1.77%)
12. Sangtam (1.07%)
13. Chakhesang (0.81%)
14. Others (16.8%)

== Tourism ==
=== Religious and historical sites ===
- Ruins of Kachari Rajbari

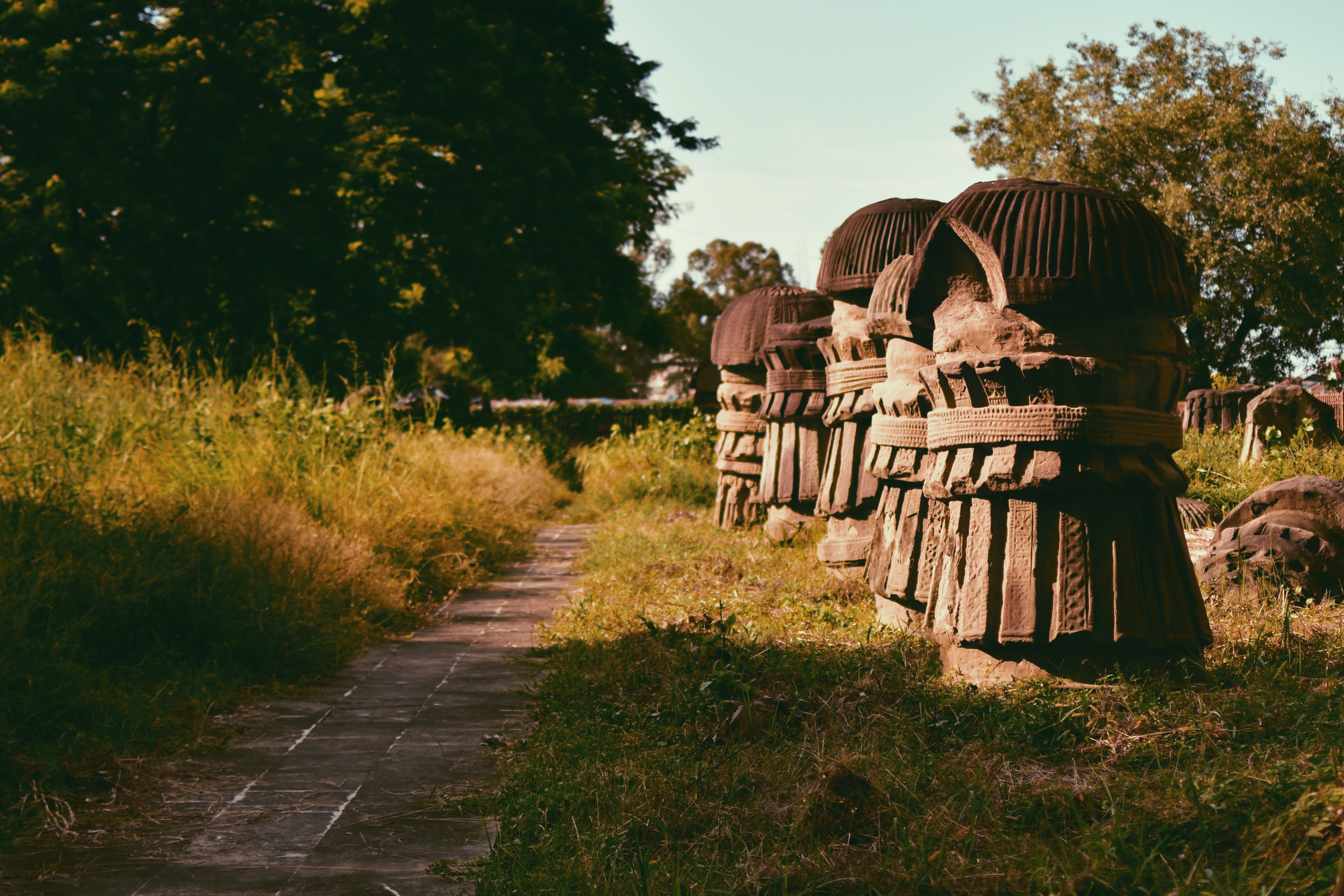
Kachari Rajbari Ruins

Although is left in ruins after centuries of abandonment, after facing conflict with the Ahom King in 18th century and with the settlement of township occupying almost half of its former glorious fortress, is still a national heritage site. It signifies great historical importance for the region of North-East. It also gives great value to the state of Nagaland.

- Dimapur City Tower

The Dimapur City Tower is a major landmark of the city. It is located at Circular Road in the heart of Dimapur. Also known as the Clock Tower, the tower is decorated with Christmas Lights during the Christmas season.

- Dimapur Jain Temple

The Dimapur Jain Temple was built in 1947. The temple has some intricate glass work. The temple is considered very auspicious by the people of Dimapur. The temple was built by the tireless effort of Shri Jethmal Sethi, Shri Phulchand Sethi, Shri Udayram Chabra, Shri Chunnilal Kishanlal Sethi, Shri Kanhaiyal Sethi, Shri Mangilal Chabra, Motilal Patni, Subhkaran Sethi and other Jain families present in Dimapur at that time.

=== Parks and other highlights ===
Dimapur has several places where tourist can visit such as Nagaland Science Center, Stone Park, Hazi Park, Shiv Mandir and Kali Temple. The Rangapahar Wildlife Sanctuary, Nagaland Zoological Park, Green Park, Niathu Resort, Noune Resort, The Triple Falls, Nagaland Science Centre, Aqua Mellow Park and Agri Expo site in the neighbouring Chümoukedima District can be easily accessible from Dimapur.

== Transportation ==
=== Airport ===
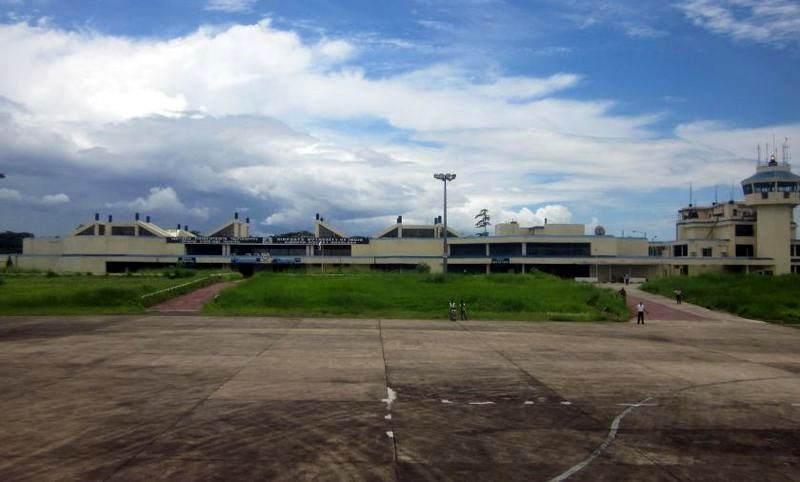
Dimapur Airport

Dimapur is served by the Dimapur Airport located at 3rd Mile (AH1), Chümoukedima District. It is the only civil airport in the state and operates routes to Kolkata, Guwahati, Imphal, and Dibrugarh.

Bangladesh Air Force is born in Dimapur on 28 September 1971.

=== Roadways ===
==== Highways passing through Dimapur ====
- Asian Highway 1
- Asian Highway 2
- NH 29: National Highway 29 (India)
- NH 129: National Highway 129 (India)
- NH 129A: National Highway 129A (India)

=== Railway ===
Dimapur has direct train services to cities like Guwahati, Kolkata, Patna, New Delhi, Bangalore, Chandigarh, Amritsar, Dibrugarh and Chennai from the Dimapur railway station. The station is categorised as an A category railway station which lies on the Lumding-Dibrugarh section under the Lumding railway division of Northeast Frontier Railway.

It is one of the two railway stations in Nagaland. The other railway station is Shokhüvi railway station.

== Sports ==
The Dimapur District Sports Council Stadium is multi-purpose sports stadium in the city while the Nagaland State Stadium is another multi-disciplinary sports stadium currently under construction.

== Economy ==
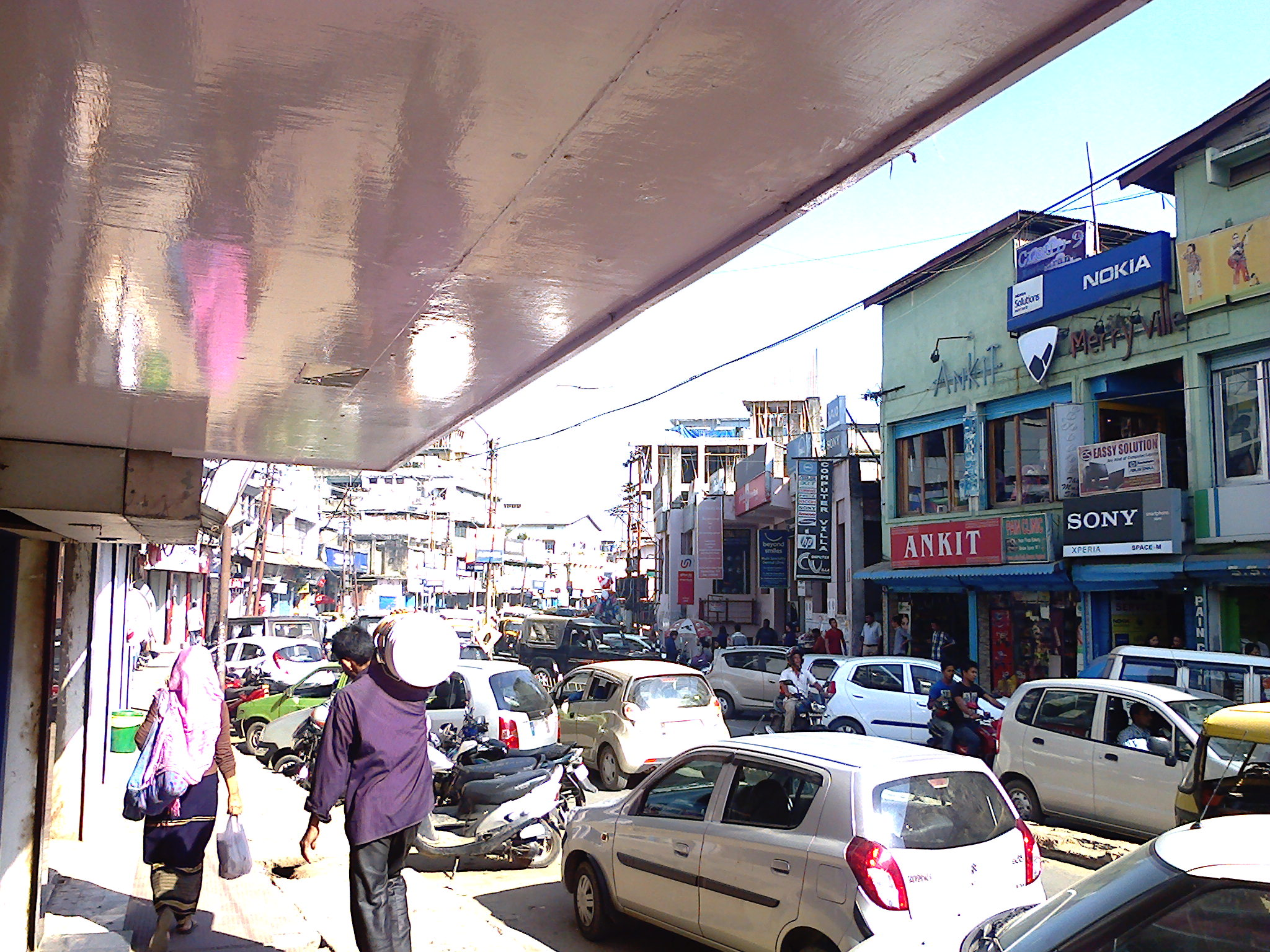
Market Area, Dimapur

Dimapur is the commercial centre of Nagaland. It also acts as a transit hub for trading goods brought in from trains at Dimapur railway station and by road via National Highway 29 to other parts of Nagaland. Many private and central banks are also located in the city. Some major hotels are Hotel Acacia (3-star hotel), Hotel Saramati, Hotel Lake Shiloi among many others.

=== Commerce ===
A number of shopping centers and markets have sprung up in Dimapur, with the HongKong Market, Central Plaza, New Market, Bank colony (Super Market Area) and Circular and NL roads serving as the main commercial areas in the city. The Complexes and shopping centres have sprung up to Notun Bosti.

The stretch from Purana Bazaar to Chümoukedima along the AH-1 is also rapidly developing into commercial areas.

The city's Hong Kong Market is well known for imported goods from Thailand, China, and Burma and is the main Shopping Attraction for Tourists visiting Nagaland. The wholesale foodgrain items are available at KL Sethi Market Complex, Jasokie Market, etc. at GS Road, Dimapur.

== Education ==
=== Colleges ===
- Dimapur Government College
- Public College of Commerce
- Salesian College of Higher Education
- Sakus Mission College
- Trinity Theological College
- Unity College
- Pranab College
- S D Jain Girls College
- Cornerstone College
- Ngullie Memorial College
- School of Engineering & Technology, Nagaland University
- Yemhi Memorial College
- St. John College

=== Schools ===
- Assam Rifles Public School
- Assembly Of God Higher Secondary School
- Don Bosco Higher Secondary School
- Government Higher Secondary School
- Greenwood School
- Holy Cross School
- Christian Higher Secondary School
- Little Star Higher Secondary School
- Living Stone Foundation Higher Secondary School
- N. N. Nagi School
- Pranab Vidyapith Higher Secondary School
- St. John Higher Secondary Residential School
- King David School, Kushiabill
- Hollotoli school

== Notable people ==
- Kevichüsa Angami (1903–1990), Politician
- Zhokhoi Chüzho, Actor
- Zuboni Hümtsoe (1990–2017), Entrepreneur
- Hekani Jakhalu Kense, Politician
- Chalie Kevichüsa (1943–1992), Journalist
- Razhukhrielie Kevichüsa (1941–2022), Bureaucrat and Musician
- Tubu Kevichüsa (1948–1996), Nationalist Leader
- Dolly Kikon, Anthropologist
- James Kithan, Sportsperson
- Viseyie Koso, Sportsperson
- Alobo Naga, Musician
- Phulchand Sethi (1911–1976), Businessperson
- Kihoto Hollohon Yepthomi (1932–2021), Politician

== See also ==
- Chümoukedima
