= Timeline of Naga history =

This is a timeline of the history of the Nagas.

== Before 19th century ==
- 1228: The Nagas first comes into contact with the Ahoms.

== 19th century ==
- 1832: The first Europeans enter the Naga Hills. Captains Jenkins and Pemberton enter Angami territory.
- 1839: Miles Bronson, the first missionary to the Naga Hills arrives in Namsang under Tirap District of present-day Arunachal Pradesh.
- 1851: The Battle of Kikrüma was fought on 11 and 12 February between the forces of the British East India Company and the Eastern Angamis.
- 1866: The British Raj establishes its first headquarters of the Naga Hills District at Samaguting (present day Chümoukedima).
- 1878: The headquarters was transferred to Kohima creating a city that remains an important center of administration, commerce and culture for Nagaland.
- 1879: 4 October, British Political Agent G. H. Damant and 35 of his team men were shot dead at Khonoma which led the British Raj to return and respond. The subsequent defeat of Khonoma marked the end of serious and persistent ultimatums in the Naga Hills.
- 1881: 27 March, The Naga Hills was officially annexed into British India.

== 20th century ==
- 1918: The Naga Club was formed.
- 1929: The Naga Club writes to the Simon Commission demanding that “Nagas should not be included within the Reformed Scheme of India”.
- 1944: 4 April, The Battle of Kohima begins.
- 1946: February, The Naga Club was reorganized as a political organization called Naga National Council (NNC).
- 1947: 14 August, The Naga Army declares its independence from British rule.
- 1960: 6 September, The 16th Punjab Regiment of the Indian Army commits an act of mass murder against the village of Matikhrü.
- 1951: 16 May, The Naga Plebiscite was held at Khuochiezie, Kohima in course of three months starting 16 May.
- 1963: 1 December, The state of Nagaland was inaugurated as the 16th state of the Indian Union.
- 1975: 11 November, The Shillong Accord of 1975 was signed between the Naga National Council and the Government of India (GoI).
- 1980: 31 January, The National Socialist Council of Nagaland (NSCN) is formed.
- 1985: 4–8 June, A violent confrontation broke out between police forces from the states of Assam and Nagaland over a border fence dispute, resulting in significant casualties and widespread destruction in the Merapani area of the Doyang Reserve Forest.
- 1986: 20 March, Two students Kekuojalie Sachü and Vikhozo Yhoshü were killed in indiscriminate firing by Nagaland Police when they participated in a peaceful protest called by the Naga Students' Federation (NSF) to rally against the state government's decision on the introduction of Indian Police Service (IPS) cadres and the extension of the Disturbed Area Belt from 5 to 20 km along the Indo-Myanmar (Indo-Burma) border. The event was so tumultuous that it led three Cabinet ministers and five State Ministers of Nagaland to resign.
- 1988: 30 April, The National Socialist Council of Nagaland (NSCN) splits into two—the NSCN Isak–Muivah (NSCN-IM) and the NSCN Khaplang (NSCN-K)
- 1993: 23 January, The Isak–Muivah group of the NSCN was admitted to the Unrepresented Nations and Peoples Organization (UNPO).
- 1994: 27 December, The 10th Assam Rifles and the 12th Maratha Light Infantry of the Indian Army raided upon the civilian populace of Mokokchung leaving 12 killed.
- 1995: 5 March, The forces of the 16th Rashtriya Rifles of the Indian Army fired upon the civilian populace of Kohima after mistaking a tyre burst of one their own vehicle for a bomb attack. 7 civilians were killed in the incident.
- 1997: 25 July, A cease-fire agreement signed between Government of India and NSCN-IM.
- 1997: 1 August, The cease-fire agreement comes into effect.

== 21st century ==
- 2000: 1 December, The Hornbill Festival was first held in Kohima.
- 2004: 2 October, Two powerful bombs were set off—one at the Dimapur Railway Station and the other at Hong Kong Market killing 30.
- 2007: 31 July, The cease-fire agreement signed in 1997 between GoI and NSCN-IM extended indefinitely.
- 2015: 3 August, The Naga Peace Accord was signed between the NSCN-IM and the Government of India.
- 2017: January – February, Nagaland goes into a state of civil unrest and protests in response against the announcement to implement 33% women reservation in the Civic Elections.
- 2021: 4 December, A unit of 21st Para Special Forces, the special forces unit, killed six civilian labourers near Oting village in the Mon District of Nagaland. Eight more civilians and a soldier were killed in subsequent violence. The incident was widely condemned with many voicing out to repeal and revoke the Armed Forces Special Powers Act.

== See also ==
- History of the Nagas
- Timeline of the Naga conflict
