= 1998 Kwakeithel shooting =

1998 shooting in Manipur, India

- Location: Kwakeithel Akham Leikai, Imphal, Manipur, India
- Date: 29 August 1998
- Deaths: 5
- Injuries: 1
- Perpetrator: Manipur Police commando

The 1998 Kwakeithel shooting occurred on 29 August 1998 at Kwakeithel Akham Leikai in Imphal in the Indian state of Manipur, when armed personnel of the Manipur Police commandos opened fire on a vehicle near Tiddim Road. The incident resulted in the deaths of five individuals, including Major Shimreingam Shaiza, while Thenucho Tünyi, a politician from Nagaland, survived with multiple bullet injuries.

The incident has been widely described in later investigations as an alleged extrajudicial killing or "fake encounter".

== Incident ==
On 29 August 1998, Thenucho Tünyi was on his way to Imphal Airport to board a flight to New Delhi.

Tünyi was accompanied by his driver and two armed Nagaland Police security guards. Upon arriving from Kohima by road, he stopped to meet his friend, Maj. Shimreingam Shaiza, at his residence at Mantripukhri in Imphal. Following a meal there, Shaiza accompanied him to the airport.

On the way, just few kilometres from the airport at Kwakeithel Akham Leikai, their car, a Maruti Esteem bearing NL-01/1005 was signalled to stop by the Manipur Police commandos. As soon as the car stopped, the commando team opened fire at the vehicle.

Shaiza exited the car and identified himself to the commandos in Meiteilon but he was fatally shot. As a result of the firing, the car was riddled with 39 bullet holes.

=== Victims ===
The shooting resulted in the deaths of five individuals:

- Maj. Shimreingam Shaiza – The first Indian army officer among the Tangkhul Nagas. He was seated on the front passenger seat and received 10 gunshot injuries. He succumbed to his injuries within minutes while being taken to the Jawaharlal Nehru Hospital.
- Tüsovehu Chakhesang – A Nagaland Police personnel seated in the rear of the vehicle. He died instantaneously from gunshot injuries.
- Kikheto Sema – A Nagaland Police personnel seated in the rear of the vehicle. He died instantaneously from gunshot injuries.
- Rükoshele Chakhesang – The driver of the vehicle. He died instantaneously from gunshot injuries.
- Hidam Budha Singh – A civilian who was working on his homestead land nearby. He sustained gunshot injuries and died within minutes while being taken to hospital.

Thenucho Tünyi was the sole survivor and sustained multiple bullet injuries.

== Investigation ==
Initial reports described the incident as an encounter between security forces and suspected insurgents. However, subsequent accounts and investigations raised questions about the circumstances of the killing.

A judicial inquiry headed by Justice C. Upendra was constituted shortly after the incident and submitted its report on 15 January 1999.

Subsequent investigations indicated that the encounter may have been staged and that evidence may have been fabricated to justify the killings.

== Charges ==
In 2025, a sessions court in Imphal framed charges against four former Manipur Police commandos in connection with the incident. The accused were:

- Thokchom Krishnatombi (Sub-Inspector)
- Khundongbam Inaobi (Constable)
- Thangkhongam Lungdim (Constable)
- Md. Akhtar Hussain (Constable)

They were charged under Sections 302 (murder), 307 (attempt to murder), 201 (causing disappearance of evidence) and 34 (common intention) of the Indian Penal Code.

== Legacy ==
In 2006, Thenucho Tünyi, then serving as the Home Minister of Nagaland attended the 9th All Naga Students' Association, Manipur (ANSAM) General Conference at Khumji in Tamenglong District as the Chief Guest. During the event, Tünyi paid tribute to his late associate Major Shimreingam Shaiza and announced financial assistance for the welfare of students in his memory. This initiative led to the establishment of the Maj. Shimreingam Shaiza Award, instituted to support students.

== See also ==
- 1991 Lahorijan ambush
- Human rights abuses in Manipur
- Insurgency in Northeast India
- Extrajudicial killings in India
