= 1991 Lahorijan ambush =

Terrorist incident in India

- Part of the Naga conflict
- Date: 14 August 1991
- Location: Lahorijan (near Dimapur), Karbi Anglong District, Assam, India
- Type: Ambush
- Target: Thenucho Tünyi
- Deaths: 12
- Injuries: several

The 1991 Lahorijan ambush occurred on 14 August 1991, when the NSCN-K attacked the convoy carrying Thenucho Tünyi, the then Speaker of the Nagaland Legislative Assembly, near Dimapur at Lahorijan in the Karbi Anglong District of Assam. The ambush resulted in the deaths of twelve, including nine Nagaland Police personnel, while Tünyi survived the assassination attempt with injuries.

== Incident ==
On 14 August 1991, the NSCN-K carried out an ambush in an assassination attempt on Thenucho Tünyi at Lahorijan, near Dimapur in the Karbi Anglong District of Assam. Tünyi was en route to Mon to grace the Independence Day celebrations on 15 August as the Chief Guest. The incident took place between Lahorijan and Khatkhati, where suspected NSCN-K militants ambushed Tünyi's convoy. The ambush resulted in the death of twelve individuals and injuring several others.

=== Victims ===
The twelve victims:

- Nine Nagaland Armed Police personnel including Pudi Kikhi, Lallen Kipgen, Viketol Angami, Viprakhwel Kera and others
- Tünyi's Personal Assistant (PA)
- Tünyi's bodyguard
- Tünyi's driver

Tünyi suffered three bullet injuries in his right arm and was rushed to a hospital in Dimapur.

Among the individuals in the convoy was Rev. Yankey Patton, the state's first chaplain, who was seated next to Tünyi. Although several bullets pierced and tore the back of his blazer, he escaped without sustaining any injuries.

== See also ==
- 1996 Dimapur car bombing
- 1998 Kwakeithel shooting
- 2019 Khonsa ambush
