= Timeline of the Naga conflict =

The following is a timeline of the Naga conflict. This timeline covers the period since the 1950s. The conflict is ongoing.

== 1960s ==
=== 1960 ===
- 6 September

The 16th Punjab Regiment of the Indian Army commits an act of mass murder against the village of Matikhrü.

== 1970s ==
=== 1975 ===
- 11 November

The Shillong Accord of 1975 was signed between the Naga National Council (NNC) and the Government of India (GoI).

== 1980s ==
=== 1980 ===
- 31 January

The National Socialist Council of Nagaland (NSCN) is formed.

=== 1988 ===
- 30 April

The National Socialist Council of Nagaland (NSCN) splits into two—the NSCN Isak–Muivah (NSCN-IM) and the NSCN Khaplang (NSCN-K)

== 1990s ==
=== 1991 ===
- 14 August

Twelve, including nine Nagaland Police personnel were killed and several were injured after being ambushed by NSCN-K militants in Lahorijan, Assam.

=== 1993 ===
- 23 January

The Isak–Muivah group of the NSCN was admitted to the Unrepresented Nations and Peoples Organization (UNPO).

=== 1994 ===
- 27 December

The 10th Assam Rifles and the 12th Maratha Light Infantry of the Indian Army raided upon the civilian populace of Mokokchung leaving 12 killed.

=== 1995 ===
- 5 March

The forces of the 16th Rashtriya Rifles of the Indian Army fired upon the civilian populace of Kohima after mistaking a tyre burst of one their own vehicle for a bomb attack. 7 civilians were killed in the incident.

=== 1996 ===
- 25 December

The NSCN-IM triggered a powerful car bomb from remote control in an assassination attempt on Kihoto Hollohon and his family.

=== 1997 ===
- 25 July

A cease-fire agreement signed between Government of India and NSCN-IM.

- 1 August

The cease-fire agreement comes into effect.

== 2000s ==
=== 2004 ===
- 2 October

Two powerful bombs were set off—one at the Dimapur Railway Station and the other at Hong Kong Market killing 30.

=== 2007 ===
- 31 July

The cease-fire agreement signed in 1997 between GoI and NSCN-IM extended indefinitely.

== 2010s ==
=== 2015 ===
- 4 June

UNLFW separatists ambushed a military convoy in Chandel district, Manipur, resulting in the death of at least 20 Indian soldiers.

- 3 August

The Naga Peace Accord was signed between the NSCN-IM and the Government of India.

=== 2019 ===
- 21 May

Eleven were killed and several were injured after being ambushed by NSCN-IM militants in Pansumthong, near Khonsa in the Tirap district of Arunachal Pradesh.

== 2020s ==
=== 2021 ===
- 4 December

A unit of 21st Para Special Forces, the special forces unit, killed six civilian labourers near Oting village in the Mon District of Nagaland. Eight more civilians and a soldier were killed in subsequent violence. The incident was widely condemned with many voicing out to repeal and revoke the Armed Forces Special Powers Act.

== See also ==
- Timeline of Naga history
- List of massacres in Nagaland
