= 1985 Merapani Incident =

Cross-border armed clashes

- Part of the Insurgency in Northeast India
Date	4–8 June 1985
Location	Assam–Nagaland border
Result	status quo ante bellum

Belligerents
Assam	Nagaland; Naga Rebels	India

Units involved
Assam Police	Nagaland Police; Naga Rebels	Border Security Force; Assam Rifles

Casualties and losses
28 killed	Unknown	None
- 13–100+ civilians killed (Assam only)

The 1985 Merapani Incident was a violent confrontation between police forces from the Indian states of Assam and Nagaland. Lasting for over three days from the evening of 4 June 1985, to the early hours of 8 June 1985, the conflict arose over a border fence dispute, resulting in significant casualties and widespread destruction in the Merapani area of the Doyang Reserve Forest.

== Background ==
The inter-state boundary dispute between Assam and Nagaland originated in 1963 when Nagaland was carved out of Assam. The two states share a 512.1 km-long border.

Nagaland's creation was formalized by an act of Parliament, specifying the boundary between Tuensang district and Assam, and the Nagaland State Act of 1962 defined borders according to a 1925 notification, but Nagaland contested this delineation, demanding the inclusion of Naga-dominated areas in Assam. They also asserted historical claims that extended further north. The Sundaram Commission (1972–76) concluded that Nagaland's claim to 4,975 square miles of Assam's territory lacked verifiable evidence. The colonial merger of the Naga Hills district with Assam in 1873 was cited as evidence by the commission.

Despite constitutional arbitration and commissions' findings, Nagaland pursued a policy of extending its northern boundary. Neutral forces in the region also failed to take action.

The Merapani Clash was not an isolated incident. Previous clashes in 1965, 1968, 1979, and 1982 had occurred, killing thousands among them. The Assam government had filed a case in the Supreme Court seeking the identification of boundaries and resolution of border disputes, which remained pending by 1985.

== Events ==
=== Immediate background ===
Prior to the clash, there was a culmination of escalating tensions, triggered by the construction of a check post and border fence by the Assam Forest Department near Merapani police station, violating a 1972 agreement between Assam and Nagaland. Disputes over territory and frequent assaults on civilians further heightened tensions.

=== Conflict ===
The clash commenced on the evening of June 4, 1985, coinciding with discussions between commissioners of the two states aimed at defusing tensions. Nagaland stated that the reason for the clash was the aforementioned violation of the 1972 agreement, whereas the Assamese government insisted the attack was unprovoked. The ensuing violence resulted in the destruction of Merapani Bazar, the Assam police station, and numerous civilian settlements. Over 27,000 villagers were rendered destitute. Conservative estimates suggested at least 41 fatalities, with over 28 being police officers, and over a hundred wounded.

Sporadic incidents continued despite the presence of the Assam Rifles, prompting senior Central government officials, including Minister of State for Home Affairs Ram Dulari Sinha, to intervene.

Survivors reported Naga Armed Police units perched on hills, using medium machine guns, three inch mortars, and rocket launchers to attack Assam police positions. The fusillade continued all night, leading to the destruction of Merapani Bazar and police station.

The Nagaland Government claimed that tension escalated when the Assam Forest Department constructed a checkpost near Merapani police station, violating the 1972 agreement on maintaining status in disputed areas. The Assamese, however, asserted that the Nagaland attack was unprovoked and followed a series of assaults on civilians.

== Casualties and destruction ==
According to Assamese government records, the three-day clash resulted in 41 deaths, including 28 Assamese police personnel, and 89 policemen and 12 civilians were injured. The casualties on the Naga side are unknown. Extensive destruction occurred in the Merapani area, affecting 96 villages, displacing 32,229 refugees, and damaging numerous structures, including schools, temples, and police stations.

Other sources indicate that over a hundred Assamese villagers were massacred after the Naga gained control of the area.

== Aftermath ==
The Nagas eventually returned to their side of the border, and neutral forces eventually took up patrol positions in the region.

The boundary dispute had economic dimensions, with timber and oil resources in the region adding complexity to the issue. In the conflicts aftermath, the destruction of forests affected plywood factories, and unscrupulous logging exacerbated tensions.

Despite assurances from both state governments that such incidents would not recur, the aftermath of the clash witnessed ongoing tensions and sporadic incidents of arson and assaults on civilians. The Centre faced challenges in dealing with the situation firmly due to ongoing crises in Punjab and Gujarat. Despite meetings between chief ministers and central officials, a lasting resolution remained elusive. The border problem continued to be volatile, with concerns about the involvement of armed groups and external influences.

In 2004, clashes in Golaghat once again ignited fears of a repeat incident leading to hundreds fleeing.

Other violent incidents took place along the border in 1989, 2011, and 2014.
