= Yankey Patton =

Naga Chaplain

The Reverend Yankey Patton

Chaplain of Naga National Council
- In office 1956–1960

Nagaland State Chaplain
- In office 1989–2003
- Preceded by: Office Established
- Succeeded by: Deo Vihienuo

Personal details
- Born: 15 March 1927
- Died: 28 January 2022 (aged 94) Diphupar, Chümoukedima District, Nagaland, India
- Spouse: Orenyimi Tsanglao (m. 1954; died 2014)
- Children: 1
- Occupation: Chaplain
- Awards

Religious life
- Religion: Christianity
- Denomination: Baptist (Nagaland Baptist Church Council)
- Church: Protestant
- Profession: Evangelist

Yankey Patton (15 March 1927 – 28 January 2022) was an Indian chaplain from Nagaland. He served as the first chaplain of the Naga National Council and also the first state chaplain of Nagaland.

== Early life and career ==
Yankey Patton was born on 15 March 1927 to a Lotha Naga family from Ralan.

On 12 July 1956, he was appointed as the first chaplain of the Naga National Council.

In 1989, Patton served as the first state chaplain of Nagaland. He served till 2003.

=== 1991 Lahorijan ambush ===
On 14 August 1991, Patton was among the individuals in the convoy that was ambushed by the NSCN-K at Lahorijan, near Dimapur, in the Karbi Anglong District of Assam. Twelve were killed, including Nagaland Police personnel and several sustained injuries. Patton, was seated next to Thenucho Tünyi, the then Speaker of the Nagaland Legislative Assembly. Although several bullets pierced and tore the back of his blazer, he escaped without sustaining any injuries.

== Death ==
Patton died on 28 January 2022 at his personal residence in Diphupar, Chümoukedima after a prolonged illness at aged 94.

== Personal life ==
=== Family ===
Patton married Orenyimi Tsanglao, the first Lotha Naga woman evangelist, in 1966. She died in 2014. Together the couple had one son, seven grandchildren and three great-grandchildren.
