= Environment and Forests Department =

Environment and Forests Department may refer to these government agencies in India:

- Environment and Forests Department (Arunachal Pradesh)
- Environment and Forests Department (Assam)
- Environment and Forests Department (Tamil Nadu)
