= Human trafficking in Peru =

Peru ratified the 2000 UN TIP Protocol in January 2002.

In 2009, Peru was a source, transit, and destination country for men, women, and children subjected to trafficking in persons, specifically forced labor and forced prostitution. Several thousand persons were estimated to be subjected to conditions of forced labor within Peru, mainly in mining, logging, agriculture, brick making, and domestic servitude. Many trafficking victims were women and girls from impoverished rural regions of the Amazon, recruited and coerced into prostitution in urban nightclubs, bars, and brothels, often through false employment offers or promises of education. Indigenous persons were particularly vulnerable to debt bondage. Forced child labor remained a problem, particularly in informal gold mines, cocaine production, and transportation. There were reports the terrorist group Sendero Luminoso, or Shining Path, recruited children as soldiers and drug mules. To a lesser extent, Peruvians were subjected to forced prostitution in Ecuador, Spain, Italy, Japan, and the United States, and forced labor in Argentina, Chile, and Brazil. Peru was also a destination country for some Ecuadorian and Bolivian females in forced prostitution, and some Bolivian citizens in conditions of forced labor. Child sex tourism was present in Iquitos, Madre de Dios, and Cuzco. Traffickers reportedly operated with impunity in certain regions where there was little or no government presence. In 2006, International Labour Organisation estimated that there were 33,000 people in conditions of forced labor in the Peruvian Amazon, primarily in the regions of Ucayali, Madre de Dios, Loreto, Pucallpa, Atalaya and Puerto Maldonado.

In 2010, the Government of Peru did not fully comply with the minimum standards for the elimination of Trafficking; however, it made significant efforts to do so. Last year, the government increased law enforcement efforts against trafficking crimes and maintained public awareness initiatives. However, the government failed to provide adequate victim services and made insufficient efforts to address the high incidence of labor trafficking in the country.

In October 2011, almost 300 women and young girls were rescued from sexual exploitation in a raid in an Amazonian region of Peru known as a gold mining hub.

The U.S. State Department's Office to Monitor and Combat Trafficking in Persons placed the country in "Tier 2" in 2017 and 2023.

In 2021, the Organised Crime Index gave the country a score of 7 out of 10 for human trafficking, noting that most trafficking was linked to mining works.

== History (1894-1910) ==
During the rubber boom, thousands of indigenous people were enslaved along the Peruvian Amazon through Correrías, a term synonymous with slave raids, so that their labor could be exploited to extract rubber. Anthropologist Søren Hvalkof noted that Correrías were common along the Ucayali River as well as its tributaries and they affected all of the indigenous groups in that area. Correrías on the Peruvian side of the Madre de Dios River began around 1894, after the development of the Isthmus of Fitzcarrald, named after the Peruvian rubber baron Carlos Fitzcarrald. Fitzcarrald's enterprise was dependent on indigenous slave labor, primarily from the Asháninka, Mashco-Piro, Harákmbut, Shipibo and Conibo nations. In certain areas of the Peruvian Amazon, Correrías primarily captured women and children while the elderly as well as men were killed.

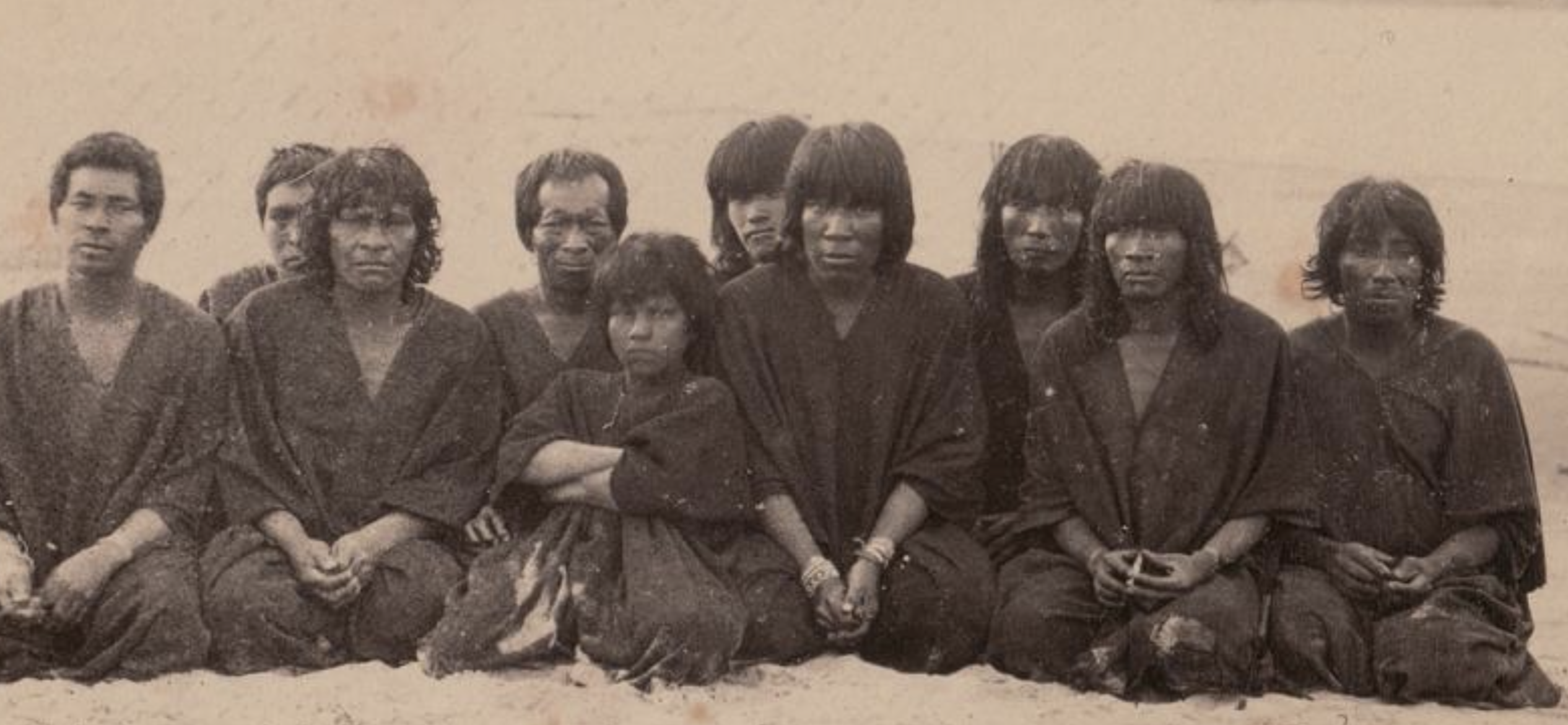
Natives in the Upper Amazon Valley

The exploitation of indigenous people enslaved by Carlos Fitzcarrald's enterprise continued after Fitzcarrald's death in 1897. Carlos Scharff assumed responsibility for a large portion of Fitzcarrald's enterprise as well as its workforce, he eventually became the most powerful rubber baron on the Ucayali, Urubamba Rivers and their tributaries. Scharff began a series of forced migrations for his work force with the intention of exploiting new rubber sources on the Purus River. Due to the nature of rubber extraction in the area Scharff's enterprise operated, his workforce was constantly required to relocate once local rubber sources were exhausted. Hundreds of indigenous people were relocated from the Ucayali and Juruá Rivers towards the Purus River by 1901. In 1905, Scharff began another series of migrations for his workforce from the Purus River to the Las Piedras River. Scharff was later killed in 1909 in a mutiny by his workforce. While travelling through the region that Scharff's enterprise was active, anthropologist William Curtis Farabee noted the presence of a rubber tapper referred to as Torres. Torres was a migrant from the Putumayo River basin and he trafficked around twenty Huitoto families from that region to the Madre de Dios area. Farabee noted that this was a journey of more than one thousand miles, and some of the trafficked indigenous people must have died along the way from dysentary and fevers.

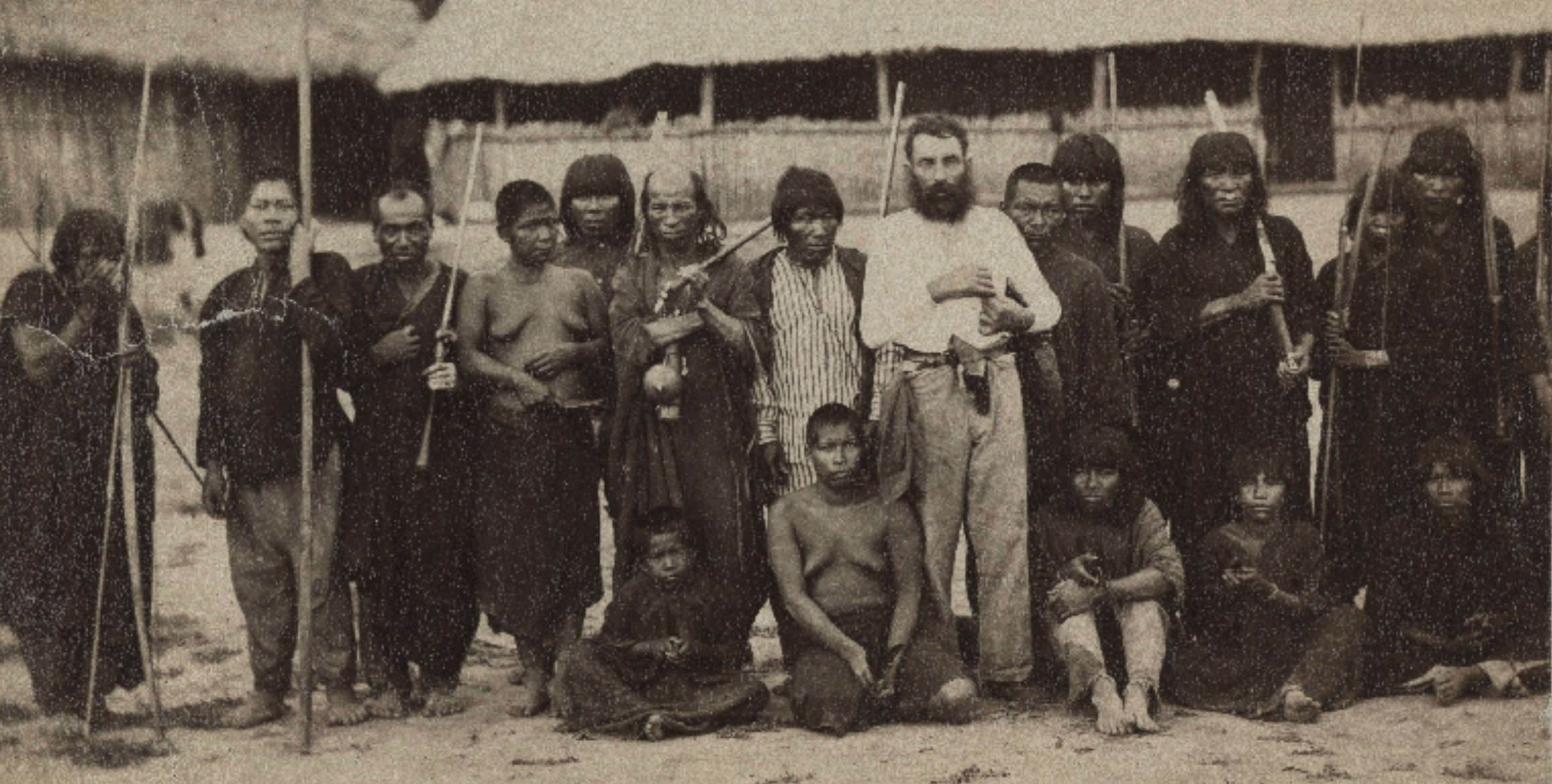
An Italian man surrounded by Shipibo and Conibo natives at a settlement near the Ucayali River.

Several government officials from Loreto and missionaries that travelled along the Ucayali and Marañon Rivers reported the perpetration of atrocities against indigenous people on those rivers as well as human trafficking. Government commissioner Joaquin Capello attempted to combat human trafficking in the department of Loreto by issuing a decree that required patron's to pay a bond for peon's that were travelling to another country. Several rubber merchants protested this decree to Prefect Hildebrando Fuentes in 1904 and pursued its annulment. The continuance of human trafficking in Loreto was denounced by subprefect Benito Lores in 1903, Lores emphasized that instances of trafficking were covered up under the pretense of transferring a peon's debt from one patron to another. Lores claimed that wealthy merchants in Iquitos were responsible for trafficking indigenous people towards Brazil "[w]here there is no law other than the whip or the bullet." Fuentes believed that this practice was depopulating the department of Loreto, specifically around Rioja, Moyobamba, Lamas, Tarapoto, Nauta, Parinari and Pebas.

Fuentes described the practice of correrías in a book he published in 1908, he noted that men and elderly women were typically killed while children as well as young females were trafficked to nearby rubber camps or Iquitos. correrías were referred to as "the great crime of the mountain" by Fuentes, however he claimed that his government was incompetent to put an end to them because they occurred beyond the reach of authorities. According to Fuentes, the majority of indigenous servants located at Iquitos in 1908 were captured during correrías and they were often sold in Iquitos for prices ranging between £30 and £50. The American engineer Walter Ernest Hardenburg also corroborated the claim that indigenous people were sold at Iquitos, for prices ranging between £20 and £40. Peruvian engineer César Cipriani also detailed the occurrence of correrías in the Gran Pajonal region. In Ciprani's words, the rubber barons "encourage and force the savages to surrender to the so called correrías, which means murders, crimes, bloody scenes, all concluding with the theft of children and women and the complete disappearance of a family, whose weak and unfortunate members have to be traded material."

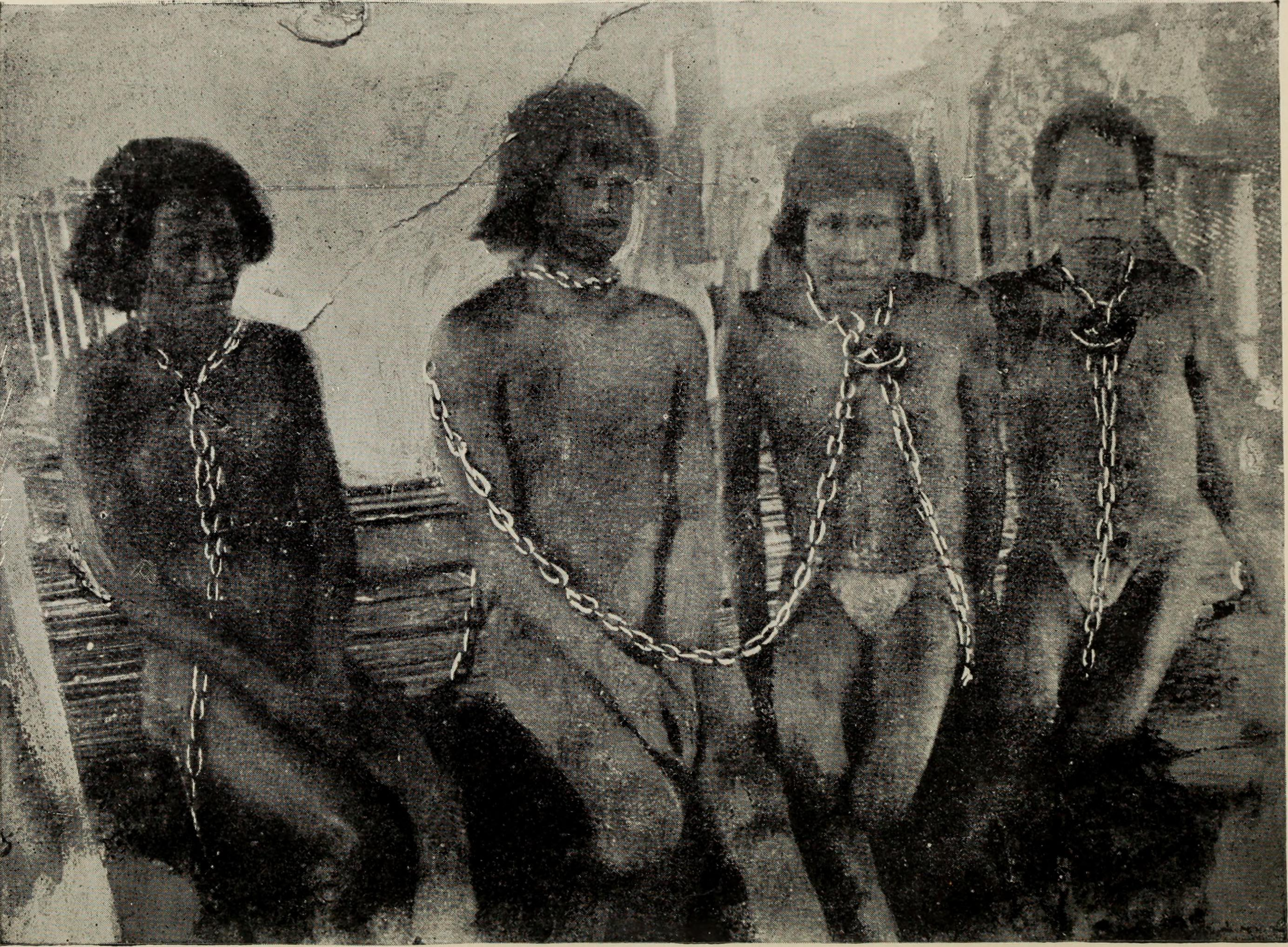
Natives imprisoned by the Peruvian Amazon Company, photograph circa 1912.

== Prosecution (2010) ==
The Government of Peru improved efforts to combat human trafficking through law enforcement last year. Law 28950 prohibits all forms of trafficking in persons, prescribing penalties of eight to 25 years’ imprisonment depending on the circumstances. These penalties are sufficiently stringent and commensurate with those prescribed for other serious crimes, such as rape. During the reporting period, police investigated 137 trafficking cases; of these, 34 involved forced labor and 103 involved sex trafficking, with a total of 185 reported victims. Authorities brought forth 78 trafficking cases to the judiciary and secured the convictions of nine sex trafficking offenders, who received sentences ranging from three to 30 years’ imprisonment, in addition to fines. In comparison, Peruvian authorities prosecuted 54 cases and convicted five sex trafficking offenders the previous year. However, there were very few prosecutions and no convictions reported for forced labor offenses, despite an estimated high incidence of forced labor in the country. The government's dedicated anti-trafficking police unit consisted of approximately 30 officers.

Police maintained and expanded the use of an electronic case tracking system for human trafficking investigations, although this system did not track judicial activity, such as prosecutions and convictions. Corruption among low-level officials enabled trafficking in certain instances, and individual police officers tolerated the operation of unlicensed brothels and the prostitution of children. No investigations or allegations of official complicity with trafficking activity were reported last year. The government provided training on human trafficking to law enforcement officials, immigration officials, diplomats, and legal officials, among others. The government collaborated with foreign governments on anti-trafficking initiatives and investigations.

== Protection (2010) ==
The government provided limited assistance to trafficking victims last year. The government did not employ a formal mechanism for identifying trafficking victims among vulnerable populations, such as adult women in prostitution. While the government had no formal process for referring trafficking victims for treatment, authorities could refer child victims of trafficking to government-operated children's homes for basic shelter and care, two of which provide specialized care to victims of commercial sexual exploitation. Similarly, the government operated general shelters for adult female victims of abuse, which some trafficking victims accessed during the reporting period.

Non-governmental organizations (NGOs) provided care to sexually exploited women; however, specialized services and shelter for trafficking victims remained largely unavailable. The government did not provide financial assistance to anti-trafficking NGOs, though it provided in-kind support; adequate victim services remained unavailable in many parts of the country. The most well-known NGO is CHS Alternativo, with headquarters in Lima, Iquitos, Cusco and Madre de Dios, which has more than fifteen years promoting human rights, especially those of women and minors vulnerable to trafficking in persons, sexual exploitation, child labour and forced labour.

Foreign victims had access to the same services as Peruvian victims. Last year, Peruvian authorities identified 185 trafficking victims, 159 women and 26 men – though the number of victims in the country is thought to be much higher – and provided 19 of these victims with legal, social, and psychological services. Some trafficking victims were not advised of their rights or provided with medical treatment, and some police officers released them without recognizing their victim status or referring them to shelters; some of these victims ended up returning to brothels in search of shelter and food.

Lack of victim participation in the investigation or prosecution of traffickers remained a problem, in addition to the lack of a witness protection program. Some victims may not have pursued legal redress because they could not afford legal representation. The government did not penalize victims for unlawful acts committed as a direct result of being trafficked. Trafficking victims were eligible for temporary and permanent residency status under Peruvian refugee law, and at least 11 victims were granted such permanent residency. During the year, authorities assisted foreign trafficking victims with voluntary repatriation. Many of the country's 412 labor inspectors have received training on forced labor; in 2009, the government created an elite team of five inspectors to address forced labor in the Amazon, but the team found their budget was insufficient to complete the mission.

== Prevention (2010) ==
The Government of Peru sustained anti-trafficking prevention efforts. The government maintained an anti-trafficking campaign and operated and promoted a hotline for trafficking-related crimes and information, which received 44 reports of trafficking in 2009. The government continued to air anti-trafficking videos in transportation hubs, warning travelers of the legal consequences of engaging in trafficking activity or consuming services from trafficked persons. Although some areas of the country are known child sex tourism destinations and Peruvian laws prohibit this practice, there were no reported convictions of child sex tourists. The government trained 710 government officials and tourism service providers about child sex tourism, conducted a public awareness campaign on the issue, and reached out to the tourism industry to raise awareness about child sex tourism; to date, 60 businesses have signed code of conduct agreements nationwide. No efforts to reduce demand for commercial sex acts or forced labor were reported. The government provided Peruvian peacekeepers with human rights training prior to deployment.

== See also ==
- Human rights in Peru
- Child camel jockey
- Child labour
- Child laundering
- Comfort woman
- Commercial sexual exploitation of children
- Debt bondage
- Exploitation
- Sexual exploitation
- Forced labour
- Forced prostitution
- Illegal immigration
- ILO
- Kidnapping
- Military use of children
- People smuggling
- Serious and Organised Crime Group
- Sharecropping
- South East Asia Court of Women on HIV and Human Trafficking
- Trafficking of children
