= Wildlife Trust of India =

Wildlife Trust of India (WTI)
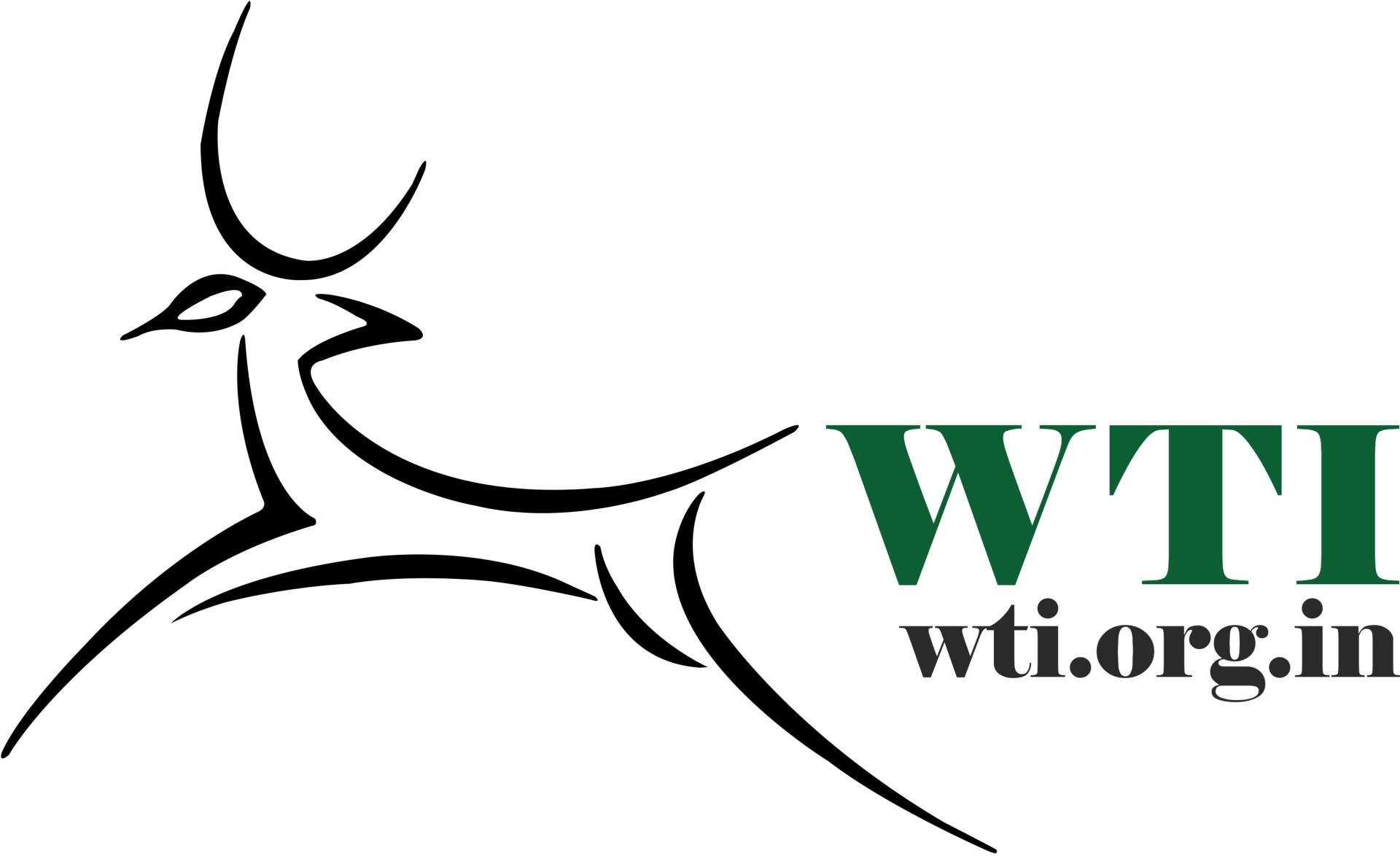
- Type: Charitable Trust under Government of India Act.
- Industry: Wildlife Conservation
- Founded: 1998, New Delhi, INDIA
- Headquarters: NOIDA, Uttar Pradesh INDIA
- Area served: All India
- Key people: Vivek Menon (Founder)
- Services: Emergency Rescue, Species Recovery, Conservation Action, Wildlife Rehabilitation, Enforcement and Law
- Revenue: 182,208,000 Indian rupee (2025)
- Total assets: 589,286,000 Indian rupee (2025)
- Number of employees: 200+
- Website: www.wti.org.in

The Wildlife Trust of India (WTI) is an Indian wildlife conservation action institution. It works closely with the Ministry of Environment, Forest and Climate Change under the Government of India, as well as with the respective state government forest and wildlife departments.

== History ==
WTI was established in 1998 in response to the numerous crises confronting India’s wildlife and wild habitats. Its mission is to conserve nature, especially endangered species and threatened habitats, in partnership with communities and governments.

With more than 45 conservation projects spanning 23 states, WTI's initiatives range from the Pir Panjal mountains in Kashmir to the mangrove forests of Kannur in Kerala, and from the habitats of Himalayan black bears in Arunachal Pradesh to whale shark aggregation grounds off the coast of Gujarat.

== Wildlife Centres ==
The Centre for Wildlife Rehabilitation and Conservation (CWRC) is a wildlife care facility that is run by Wildlife Trust of India and Assam Forest Department, with financial support from International Fund for Animal Welfare.

The Centre for Bear Rehabilitation and Conservation (CBRC) is the first specialised rehabilitation centre for Asiatic black bears in India. It is jointly run by Wildlife Trust of India, the Department of Environment, Forest & Climate Change, Govt. of Arunachal Pradesh with financial support from International Fund for Animal Welfare.

== Big ideas ==
=== Wild Aid ===
Wild Aid is the outreach arm of WTI. It strives to deliver assistance during emergencies and pressing conservation challenges, aiming to address issues promptly and introduce solutions to longstanding problems.

Wild Aid, is dedicated to offering short-term, focused aid, encompassing both financial and technical support, to address emergencies and emerging conservation issues. The organization responds to distressed animals, introduces pilot initiatives and creative concepts to bolster conservation efforts, and directs public attention to conservation crises. There are over 400 Wild Aid projects in India.

=== Wild Rescue ===
“To increase the welfare of individual displaced animals while enhancing conservation and pioneering science-based rehabilitation and wildlife health across India, and in doing so to save at least 40,000 lives in the decade.”

Wildlife displacement, as conceptualized within the framework of the Wild Rescue division's "Big Idea," refers to the undesired dislodgment of wild animals, either spatially outside their natural habitat or functionally within their habitat.

To tackle these displacements, dedicated wildlife rehabilitation facilities play a crucial role. The Centre for Wildlife Rehabilitation and Conservation (CWRC) near Kaziranga Tiger Reserve in Assam and the Centre for Bear Rehabilitation and Conservation (CBRC) near Pakke Tiger Reserve in Pakke Kesang District of Arunachal Pradesh serve as key centres. Additionally, Mobile Veterinary Service (MVS) units are stationed in Protected Areas where such displacements are prevalent. WTI has also taken the lead in establishing a network of wildlife rehabilitators in India through the Emergency Relief Network (ERN) who contribute to the rehabilitation of distressed wildlife.

=== Species Recovery ===
“Recover population/sub-populations of at least six threatened species by improving their recovery states (categories) and demonstrating recovery through improved recovery scores.”

This division uses improved techniques, intensive management, conservation breeding, reintroduction, and restocking to recover populations of threatened species.

WTI has helped the recovery of the last remaining wild buffalo sub-species in central India through cloning and conservation breeding. Notably, the organization contributed to the restoration of the Eastern swamp deer population in Manas National Park by relocating individuals from Kaziranga National Park in Assam. Additionally, habitats for cheer pheasants in Himachal Pradesh were restocked, and surveys in Jammu and Kashmir confirmed the presence of markhor in new areas.

=== Protected Area Recovery ===
“To improve the existing functionality of six selected Protected Areas (PAs) and restore their ecological integrity.”

Focused on India’s Protected Area Recovery, the strategic approach of this division includes habitat improvement activities, restocking and/or monitoring of populations of endangered species, providing specialized training to frontline forest staff, sensitizing fringe communities (especially school children) about the importance of conservation, and legal and political interventions required to preserve or expand the territory of protected wildlife habitats.

Since 2003, WTI, in partnership with the International Fund for Animal Welfare (IFAW), the Bodoland Territorial Council (BTC), and the Assam Forest Department, has led conservation efforts to ‘Bring Back Manas, a UNESCO World Heritage Site whose flora and fauna were ravaged by militancy through the late 1980s and 1990s.

Another crucial intervention has been conducted in the Valmiki Tiger Reserve in Bihar.

WTI Protected Area Recovery also assisted in expanding India’s Protected Area network by getting new reserves demarcated in Jammu and Kashmir, Tamil Nadu, and Maharashtra.

=== Conflict Mitigation ===
“Demonstrate seven innovative and replicable models of Human-Wildlife Conflict mitigation to catalyze appropriate changes in policy.”

Conflict between humans and large carnivores is an escalating problem across the country and WTI has been successfully implementing proactive approaches towards mitigating such conflicts. Under WTI’s holistic model, a team comprising a biologist, sociologist and veterinarian is constituted as a Rapid Response Team (RRT) in high human-wildlife conflict areas. The veterinarian responds to wildlife emergencies, the biologist determines why animals could be straying into human habitation areas in that particular landscape, while the sociologist works with local communities to sensitize and prepare them for possible conflict scenarios. The RRT works with the State Forest Department and the Primary Response Teams (PRTs) which comprise local volunteers and influential people.

=== Enforcement and Law ===
Enforcement and Law aims to reduce wildlife crime by assisting enforcement agencies in

1. Illegal Wildlife Trade (IWT) control
2. Championing litigation against wildlife crime in trial courts and
3. Strengthening frontline field staff through training, capacity building and morale boosting.

Trade control works through various projects across the country to assist enforcement agencies through field-level support. Information regarding IWT is shared with the state forest departments, Wildlife Crime Control Bureau (WCCB) and other enforcement agencies for necessary action. The division has assisted in several raids and over 275 seizures of wildlife articles ranging from tiger bones and skins, ivory, shahtoosh shawls and wool, bear bile, hathajodi to mongoose hair and brushes.

Under Pan India Enforcement Assistance, the division assists in the prosecution of wildlife offenders by providing legal intervention and assistance at the District and High Court levels. This ensures that suspects who are involved in IWT face fair trials and legal procedures as per the laws of the country. The organization has assisted agencies in some high-profile cases in the past including the ones against Late Sansar Chand, Salman Khan and MAK Pataudi.

=== Wild Lands ===
Wild Land securement is a strategy that aims to secure critical habitats outside the traditional protected area system. The secured lands include important habitat linkages, wetlands, mangroves, grasslands, Important Bird Areas (IBAs), sacred groves etc. The focus of this Big Idea is to secure critical habitats and restore degraded and fragmented ecosystems like coral reefs, wetlands and mangroves.

Presently, the division has five projects under it the Garo Green Spine Conservation Project, Meghalaya; Kannur Kandal Project, Kerala; Sarus Habitat Securement Project, Uttar Pradesh; Mithapur Coral Reef Recovery Project, Gujarat; and the Forgotten Cats of Shergaon in Arunachal Pradesh.

=== Natural Heritage Campaign ===
“To create a positive and measurable change in people’s perceptions to improve the conservation and welfare of wildlife in India with at least six planned campaigns.”

The Natural Heritage Campaign (NHC) division is the voice of conservation action in WTI. As the name suggests the division aspires to create a positive and measurable change in people’s perceptions of wildlife conservation and Natural Heritage in India. NHC bridges the gap between conservation action and community participation.

=== Right of Passage ===
Within the Wild Lands Division, the Right of Passage big idea aims to secure connectivity and safe passage for large mammals like elephants and tigers across their identified corridors.

WTI along with Govt. of India and top scientists have identified and surveyed 101 such functional corridors across 11 states for the 29,000 odd Asian Elephants in India (60% of the species global population). The organization, in partnership with the Government of India's Project Elephant, the forest departments of elephant range states, and various non-governmental organizations, is dedicated to safeguarding and securing elephant corridors, while simultaneously strengthening human-elephant coexistence among communities in corridor areas.

== See also ==
- Bombay Natural History Society (BNHS)
- Sanctuary Asia
- Protected areas of India
- Wildlife Institute of India (WII)
- Zoo Outreach Organisation
