= Matikhrü Massacre =

1960 massacre in Nagaland, India

- Part of Naga conflict
- Location: Matikhrü (now in Phek District, Nagaland)
- Date: 6 September 1960; 10:00 a.m. to 3:00 p.m. (IST)
- Target: Civilians
- Attack type: Massacre
- Deaths: 23
- Perpetrators: Indian Army: 16th Punjab Regiment

The Matikhrü Massacre, took place on 6 September 1960, when forces of the 16th Punjab Regiment of the Indian Army committed an act of mass murder against the village of Matikhrü.

== Prelude ==
On 14 August 1960, the Naga Home Guards commanded by the Sümi Naga Generals attacked the 16th Assam Rifles outpost at Thuda (Phor village) in Pochury Naga area.

=== Aircraft shootdown ===
On 26 August an Indian Air Force Dakota DC-3 registered HJ233 trying to drop relief materials and ammunitions to the besieged post was shot down by the Naga Army and its crew members led by Capt. Anand Singha and 8 others members were captured at Zathsü. Outraged by the act, the Government of India unleashed a heavy army operation in the Pochury Naga area to search and rescue the captured airmen.

Despite under intense provocation, none of the captured Indian Air Force crew members were ill-treated, tortured or harmed under the custody of the Naga Home Guards and the Federal Government of Nagaland. (Out of the nine captured—five were released on September itself and the rest four were released on 16 May 1962)

=== Indian Army Rampage ===
In the events following the attack on the Thuda 16th Assam Rifles' camp and the shooting down of the aircraft, the Indian Army went on a rampage, burning all neighbouring villages, arresting, torturing and killing of innocent villagers in the Pochury Naga area.

==== September 1 ====
Six from Phor village were tortured to death.

==== September 2 ====
Two from Moke village were beaten and slaughtered to death.

==== September 3 ====
Three from Yisi village were beaten to death.

==== September 4 ====
One person from Lurari village was buried alive after severe beating and two people of Meluri village were beheaded.

==== September 5 ====
The armed soldiers went to Lephori village, arrested thirteen villagers, tortured them and poured boiling water on their bodies after tying them together to a post. Many women were also raped.

== Matikhrü Massacre ==
On 6 September 1960, the 16th Punjab Regiment posted at Kanjang Village reached Matikhrü Village at around 10:00 a.m. and surrounded the village in three rings to prevent any from escaping. All the villagers were then ordered to gather in one place with men folk were separated from women and children. The soldiers then started to hit the villagers with their gun butts demanding where the undergrounds are hiding and where the arms and ammunitions were kept.

Then the men were made to continuously jump and do sit-ups for more than five hours in the blistering sun. Wooden logs were rolled on their bodies and boiling water was poured on them. By late afternoon all women and children were threatened to leave. Then the Indian Army dragged all the men inside the house of the village chief where nine of them were butchered and beheaded to death.

Thah, the chief in his last words shouted to his men:

“It is a man's pride to sacrifice for his birthright, and I shall never surrender nor compromise. I am ready to sacrifice my life for the future generation of the Nagas.”

In the melee, one managed to escape by pushing through the rear door. The soldiers sprayed bullets at him but he could manage to outrun them. He died a few days later due to Post Traumatic Stress and his injuries.

The Indian soldiers later burnt the dead bodies inside the house along with the entire village and the granaries to ashes.

== Aftermath ==
Due to fear of further atrocities by the Indian Army, the survivors of the village wandered into deep jungle without food and shelter. They later entered Burma and stayed at a Naga Army camp in Sathi.

In late 1961, Gavin Young of The Observer visited the survivors at Sathi camp. In his book Indo-Naga War page 29 & 30 he mentioned that during his meeting with the survivors there were only a pathetic thirty survivors and in one of the photographs one can see some males, females and children standing near a medical officer in torn and tattered clothes.

Matikhrü Village was re-established in 1963.

== Legacy ==
The 6 of September is recognised as a Black Day by the Pochury Students' Union and is observed annually since 1993 by the rest of the Nagas.

== See also ==
- List of massacres in Nagaland
- List of massacres in India
