= Human rights in Peru =

Within Peru, human rights are protected under the Constitution. The Peruvian Constitution underscores the importance of the state to preserve the dignity of all human beings. The Constitution includes articles that promote the right to self-determination, equality and non-discrimination, and life. Ever since the end of the internal conflict in Peru that occurred from 1980 to 2000, the country has worked to integrate humanitarian regulations and statuses into national law. However, there are still instances of particular rights being challenged. The 2014 Human Rights Report by the United States Department of State explains how even with the Constitution protecting these basic human rights, many violations continue to occur despite these laws. In spite of the country's progress since the Maoist insurgency, many problems are still visible and show the continued marginalization and displacement of those who suffered through the systematic violence of the Peruvian conflict. In 2001, the Truth and Reconciliation Commission was founded to address the abuses that took place during this conflict.

== Background ==
In the 1980s, a decade of systematic violation of human rights occurred in Peru in the war against terrorism, characterized by guerilla groups like the Shining Path and the Tupac Amaru Revolutionary Army against the Peruvian government. Over 600,000 people were displaced as a direct result of the armed conflict, while many others disappeared. In response to greater land reform and social and economic rights, the conflict instead led to increased human rights violations. As opposition grew towards the Fujimori government, so did violence. However, both the Peruvian security forces as well as the guerrilla insurgencies were responsible for the drastic increase in human rights violations throughout the period of violence. It is estimated that more than 27,000 Peruvians died due to these human rights abuses on both sides of the conflict. Thousands of bombings, assassinations, and instances of torture were carried out against members of the government, as well as civilians, throughout the period of insurgency. The Shining Path was known to attack government leaders, community leaders, trade unionists, ethnic minorities, religious workers, human rights activists, and foreign tourists. Most of the resulting casualties were civilians, making the Peruvian internal conflict one of the most violent in its history.

At the turn of the century, Alberto Fujimori resigned from the Presidency, and the violence came to a halt. As the country began to recover from the decades of conflict, programs like the Truth and Reconciliation Commission emerged, recommending levels of compensation for those individuals and communities in areas such as "mental and physical health, education, economic support and the provision of identification documents, regardless of the resulting financial implications. The Commission worked to look into prosecuting former Peruvian security forces for committing these human rights violations for decades. However, despite these movement towards improving the human rights situation in Peru and accepting the effects of the internal conflict on specific populations, these populations continue to be displaced, evidencing that implementation processes are not occurring at a rate where sustainable solutions can be successful.

The Peruvian Constitution addresses topics of human rights from its first article. It states within the first two articles that every human has a right to their respect and dignity, as well as their life, equality, and various freedoms relating to personal opinions and security. These "fundamental rights of the person" are delineated throughout the Constitution, and act as a legal resource for human rights. However, despite this legal document and the progression past internal conflict, the country continues to face challenges in the protection of human rights. Peru is also associated with the American Convention on Human Rights, which makes it subject to the Inter-American Commission on Human Rights and the Inter-American Court of Human Rights.

== Respect for integrity ==
The second article of the Peruvian Constitution states that every person has the right "to life, his identity his normal psychical, and physical integrity, and his free development and well-being." Martha Nussbaum discusses the importance of bodily integrity in her book Creating Capabilities. In many ways, this includes the right to control your own body, and the right to be secure in good health. The Peruvian Constitution protects for these rights. In terms of labor and health rights, the Constitution discusses the instance of equal opportunity without discrimination for all Peruvian citizens.

=== Labor rights ===
Within the United States-Peru Trade Promotion Agreement, "labor law" is defined as those labor rights that are internationally recognized. These rights include "freedom of association; the effective recognition of the right to collective bargaining; the elimination of all forms of forced of compulsory labor; the effective abolition of child labor, a prohibition of the worst forms of child labor, and other labor protections for minors; the elimination of discrimination in respect of employment and occupation; and acceptable conditions of work with respect to minimum wages, hours of work, and occupational safety and health."

In Peru, labor unions are freely organized. However, they must abide by certain rules and requirements set forth in the legislation. The labor movement was originally linked with the American Popular Revolutionary Alliance, allowing for the emergence of the Confederation of Peruvian Workers in 1964. Union activity increased throughout the military years, introducing the Industrial Reform Law, which in turn led to a decrease in formal sector employment. As a result of the armed conflict in Peru in the early 1980s, economic decline increased, removing power from labor unions. Near the turn of the century, many strikes occurred throughout labor and opposition groups against Fujimori's reelection bid. Some believe that these protests were among the most successful pro-democracy mobilizations in Peru.

Between 1995 and 2003, the Peruvian government issued around 1.2 million urban household property titles. These land titles positively influenced economic outcomes for the people of Peru. The government titling program, unlike most other welfare programs, helped to increase employment opportunities in Peru, bringing more people into the labor force.

With respect to child labor, Peruvian children continue to be engaged in industry. The Peruvian government has established laws for child labor. The minimum age for work in Peru is 14 years old, and 18 years old when participating in hazardous work. In 2014, around 68% of child laborers under the legal working age were working in rural areas on farms, while 31% of child laborers worked in the urban service sector in numerous hazardous occupations. Frequently, those children in work settings live in poor, indigenous communities who rely on child labor to survive. Those children who live in extreme poverty are four times more likely to be simultaneously studying and working than those children from non-poor families. Both labor and criminal law enforcement agencies in Peru have worked to combat child labor by suggesting different forms of government action to eliminate it entirely, like expanding access to education and social programs.

=== Health rights ===
Different areas of Peru have inhabitants who experience varying levels of discrimination and poverty. These differences heighten the discrepancies in morbidity and mortality rates, as well as preventable diseases, within poor, indigenous populations. As of 2011, Peru had an infant mortality rate at 17 per 1,000 live births, and a maternal mortality rate of 98 per 100,000 live births. Although many advances in the health sector have occurred within Peru since the end of the war against terrorism, the health system has not adopted full and equal rights for all citizens of Peru. With regards to race, ethnicity, and gender, there are still visible disparities in health services. Even though Peru's national health plan expresses a clear commitment to universal access, the country still suffers to provide quality health care access to all citizens.

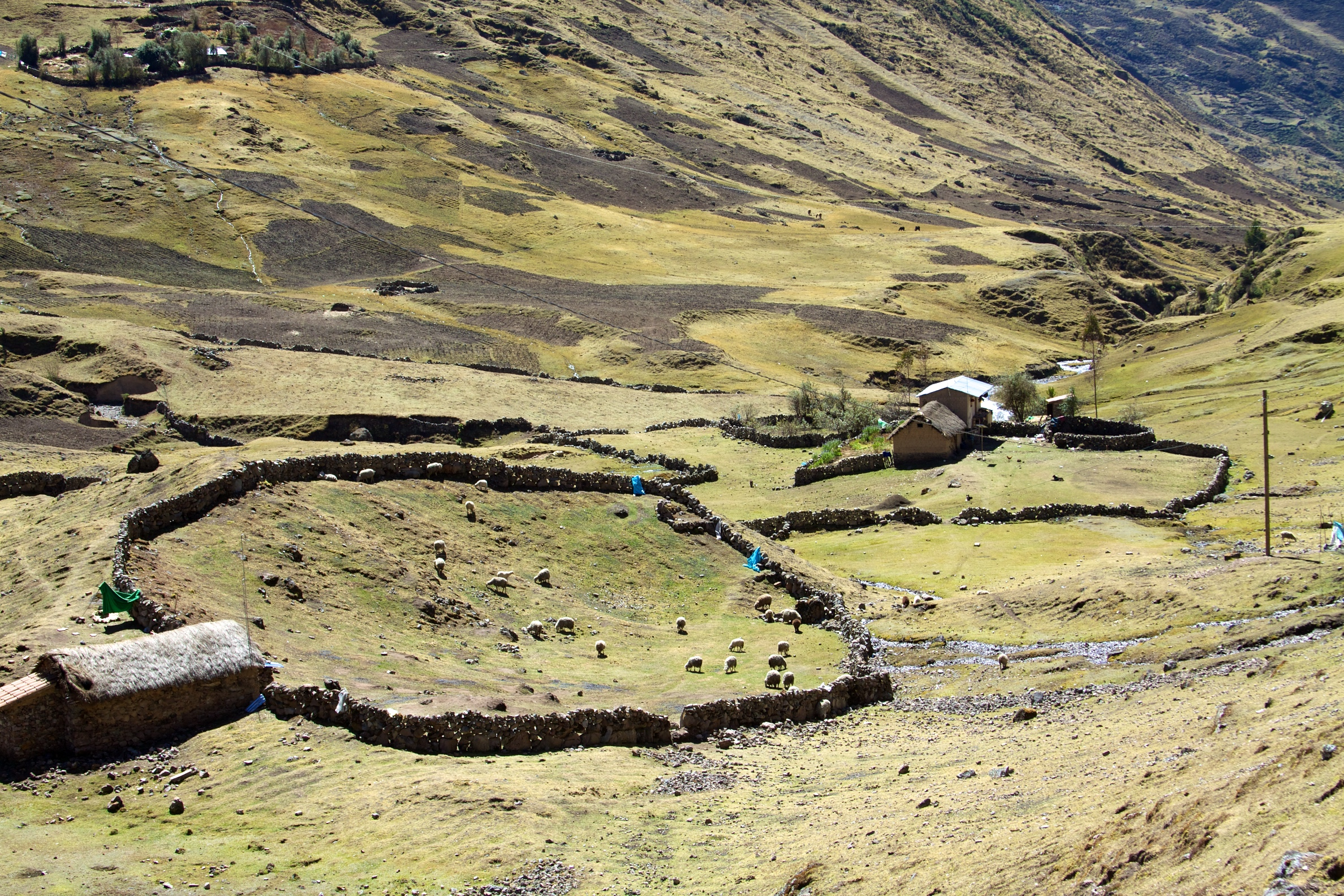
A rural home in the highlands of Peru.

In 2002, a civil-society network labelled ForoSalud was created to act as a space to have conversations regarding health. By uniting 80 member organizations throughout Peru, the program aims to develop new health policies centered on efficiency and extension of health services. The goal of the network is to fully establish health as a universal right for residents of Peru. In order for this to be accomplished, the organization has worked to promote good quality health services to reach those who live in poverty and exclusion from greater Peruvian society. It is estimated that 40% of the Peruvian population has no access to health care and larger health services. ForoSalud has prioritized health participation among citizens in order to impact larger health decisions being made on the national and regional levels. Their proposal promotes a more "bottom-up approach to participation," striving to "promote accountability of government officers for both the achievements and shortcomings of health policy."

Another group of organizations, CARE-Peru and Physicians for Human Rights, have both supported monitoring accountability and maintenance for health rights and access within Peru. Today, CARE works to structure their programs around discriminated and vulnerable populations like women, indigenous groups and rural populations, in order to help them exercise their rights as citizens of Peru. In Peru, CARE focuses on maternal health, working to reduce the high infant and maternal mortality rates, and nutrition, promoting food security and sustainable economic development initiatives to improve the health and well-being of the vulnerable citizens of Peru. All the partnerships within Peru work to help these vulnerable populations be better positioned to advocate for changes in their communities within more national health service contexts.

On June 19, 2020, Swedish public pension fund AP7 blacklisted three firms namely South Korean company SK Holdings, Canadian cannabinoid firm Cronos Group and Egyptian electrical company Elsewedy Electric for alleged human rights abuses in Peru.

== Civil liberties ==
The Constitution also protects various civil liberties, which guarantees personal freedoms. Education and freedom of religion are essential liberties that are included within the Peruvian Constitution. Education is a basic human right and within Peru, every individual is entitled to an education without discrimination. Similarly, freedom of religion is a human right that Peru acknowledges in their Constitution, preventing the instance of discrimination for religious differences.

On 11 April 2022, the Human Rights Watch stated that several decrees issued by Pedro Castillo in certain areas of the country suspend basic rights and amount to disproportionate measures that open the door to abuse.

=== Education rights ===
The Peruvian Constitution outlines that primary and secondary education are universal for those between ages 6–16, and free through the secondary level of schooling. However, in practice, free education is not as accessible in Peru as a result of parental association fees, administration, and many education materials, making it difficult for vulnerable populations to have access to a quality education. The poor, indigenous populations that reside in Peru have struggled to obtain quality education, as a result of access and language. Through models like Intercultural Bilingual Education, Peru has worked to promote education within indigenous populations across the country. However, gender, ethnicity, place of residence, and vernacular all have significant effects on attendance, reinforcing the need for more early childhood care and education programs.

There are many limitations within the education sector in Peru that do not make the system universally equal. In rural areas, the students generally were of an older age in the early-childhood programs, suggesting that rural students do not receive the strong education programs that their counterparts do in urban areas. Even though the progress of integrating women into schools has improved dramatically as a result of the Ministry of Education, the progress of integrating indigenous Peruvians into the education sector has been lacking. Indigenous students believe that the education system in place in Peru forces them to "blend with the dominant culture," because they are encouraged to discard their traditional clothing and household dialect. In 1972, the National Policy of Bilingual Education worked to promote the implementation of bilingual education within areas of Peru where Spanish was not spoken. Even though bilingual education has started to include students from different areas and from different language backgrounds, literacy and fluency in Spanish is still virtually necessary to participate in Peruvian society.

=== Religious rights ===
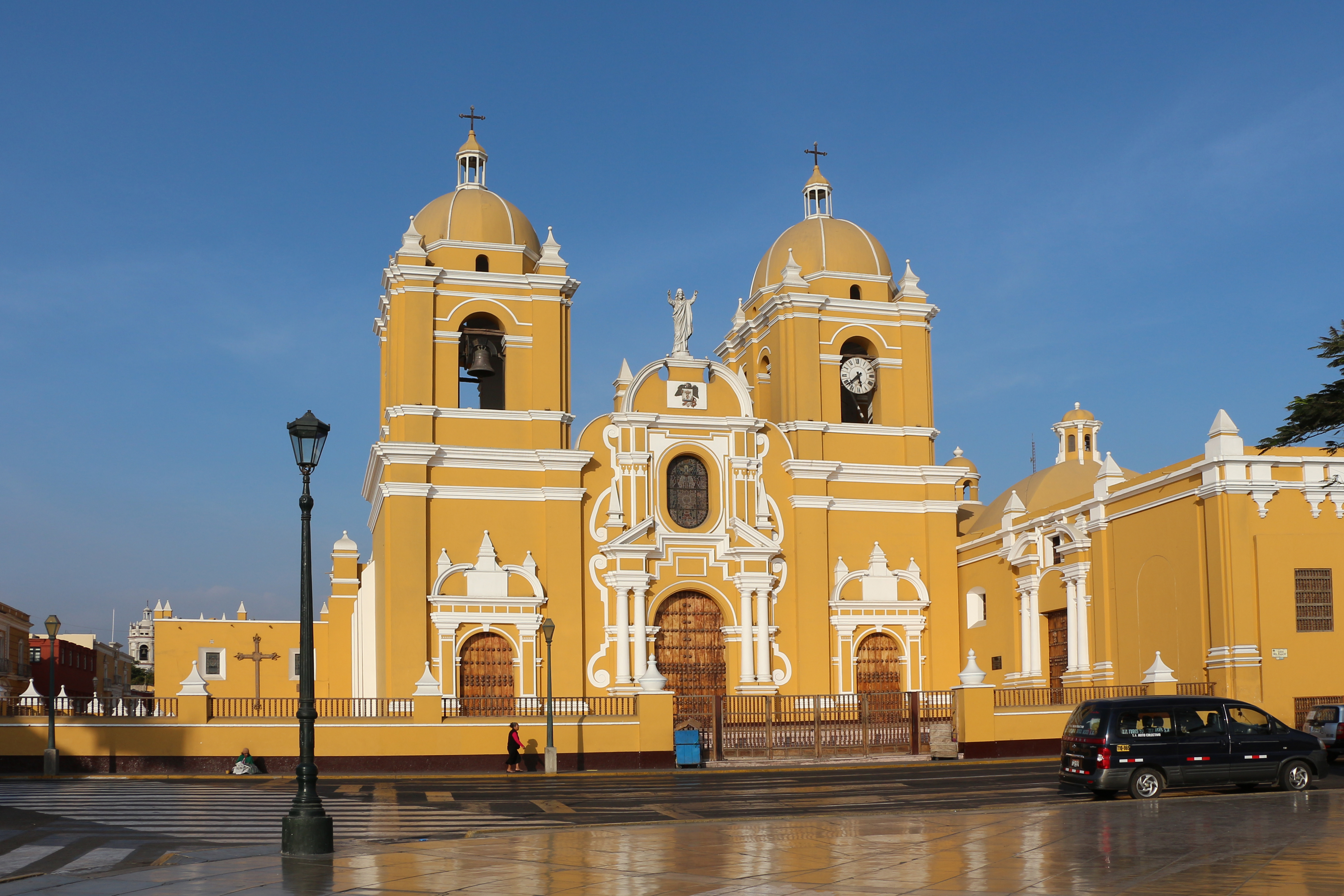
The Roman Catholic Cathedral of Trujillo in Peru.

The Constitution, along with numerous laws and policies, protect the freedom of religion. However, in the past, non-Catholic groups have continuously struggled to obtain the same freedoms given to those who are Catholic. Non-Catholic religious groups were unable to receive certain benefits provided to those in the Catholic Church, and frequently experience societal abuses as a result of their religious affiliation and beliefs. In Article 50 of the Constitution, it states that the state "extends its contribution" to the Catholic Church and "may" to other religions.

The 2017 census stated that 76% of the population was Catholic, 14% was Protestant (mainly evangelical), 5.1% were nonreligious and 4.9% followed other religions; other religious groups included Israelites of the New Universal Pact (an evangelical Christian group blending biblical and Andean religious beliefs, with an emphasis on communal farming life), Jehovah's Witnesses, The Church of Jesus Christ of Latter-day Saints (Church of Jesus Christ), Jews, Muslims, Baha'is, Buddhists, Orthodox Christians, and the International Society of Krishna Consciousness. In the past, minority religious groups have criticized religious freedom laws, claiming they do not address the problem of inequality, and can be discriminatory and unconstitutional. Many Peruvians continue to have problems with Christian religious groups who impose their culture on those populations who have different beliefs and ways of life. However, Peru has taken many steps toward establishing more legal rights for numerous religious groups. Through the development of the Office of Interfaith Affairs, Peru has worked to address problems with religious tolerance. Many minority groups have said that they were pleased with adjustments made by the government in 2011 and 2016 to reduce favoritism toward the Catholic Church and relax organization registration requirements. Even though there are still inequalities to be addressed when it comes to religious freedom, the Peruvian government has worked to combat problems surrounding non-Catholic religious groups, and continues to push for institutional equality.

== Discrimination abuses ==
In order to protect discrimination from occurring within Peru, there are many articles of the Constitution that focus on women and indigenous peoples. The Constitution reinforces equality regardless of gender, language, origin, or race. It also specifies that persons should not be the victims of moral, psychological, or physical violence. Mothers are protected under the Constitution for social and economic rights. Also under the Constitution, the unborn child is a rights-bearing subject (Article 2.1).

=== Women and reproductive rights ===
Peru is a predominantly Catholic country, making issues of sexuality and reproductive health particularly sensitive. In Peru, a mother is the "pillar of the family unit" and "the family unit is the pillar of a society." However, even though the Constitution supports gender equality, women in Peru do not have access to equal resources or power. Throughout the Fujimori regime, women were forced to abide by aggressive population policies, limiting a woman's reproductive rights. Peru's socioeconomic and health statistics are among the worst when considering equity in terms of gender and residence. Although many abuses occurred under Fujimori, when Alejandro Toledo assumed power, the Ministry of Health restricted access to contraceptives, and increased the severity of repercussions for abortions. Numerous policies were found to discriminate against women on reproductive topics, treating women (especially poor, rural women) as "objects of a policy rather than as people who have rights and are entitled to participate in decisions, programmes, and policies affecting their health at all levels."

Due to society's discrimination and traditional interpretations of the role of women at home, women battle against poverty and unemployment in Peru. Throughout Fujimori's reign, the Ministry of Health justified abstinence and the traditional role of women as obedient wives and mothers. Educationally, women in more rural areas are illiterate (33.7%) as compared to men (10.9%). Many of the women in these rural communities have no access to transportation, making walking the only alternative to get to health facilities. These facilities are usually inadequate and do not provide culturally appropriate services for non-Spanish speakers, making new or expectant mothers unwilling to seek emergency obstetric care. Foundations to Enhance Management of Maternal Emergencies (FEMME) was a project established by CARE to focus on the emergency obstetric care that was lacking in Peru. By providing responsive care to the population, this system has helped transform health systems into functional institutions to provide emergency obstetric care.

Topics of sexuality and reproduction have been political issues for decades in Peru. Policies that have been created on women's bodies, sexuality, and reproductive abilities have "corresponded mainly with the interests of the state and other powerful entities, such as the Catholic Church and conservative groups." Through the interchanging power dynamic between political elites, the Catholic Church, and feminists, topics of contraception and reproductive rights were debated. In 2004, with the emergence of ForoSalud, the Monitoring Group on Sexual and Reproductive Rights paved the way for free choice in Peru. Although many advancements have been made following the Fujimori regime, debates on sexual and reproductive rights are of limited importance to political parties, making the progress towards equal rights for women slow.

=== Sexual rights ===
Even though sexual rights are protected under the Constitution, socially, many people are excluded when they identify as a different gender. Homosexuality was legalized in the 1924 Penal Code in Peru, but is still socially stigmatized. The interpretations of homosexuality vary among different sectors in Peru. In modern sectors, it is sexual acts between two individuals of the same sex; in traditional sectors, it represents the adoption of sexual norms of the opposite gender; in the media, homosexuality includes transvestites and "feminine" men; and in news media, homosexuality is considered morally wrong and is associated with common vices like drug abuse. It was not until the introduction of the Movimiento Homosexual de Lima (MHOL) in the early 1980s that LGBT activism in Peru began. With the emergence of the HIV/AIDS epidemic, LGBT activism became increasingly visible, which increased international funding for the HIV/AIDS epidemic in the gay community. Homosexuality has been decriminalized within Peru, and by 2011, anti-gay discrimination laws were in place.

When the HIV/AIDS epidemic emerged in the 1980s, the media spread panic about the disease and its origins in "sexual promiscuity" within gay communities. The HIV infection in Peru was largely attributed to homosexual or bisexual behavior. In Peru today, HIV infections are concentrated among many low-income Peruvian men who have engaged in same-sex sexual contact. It was found that within this population, there was limited education and even if the Peruvian men knew their personal risk for the HIV infection, they were not more likely to try and obtain contraception. However, the promotion of safe sex and contraception throughout the HIV/AIDS epidemic and the promotion of positive LGBT themes has increased awareness and normalized the concept of sexual diversity within Peru.

=== Indigenous rights ===
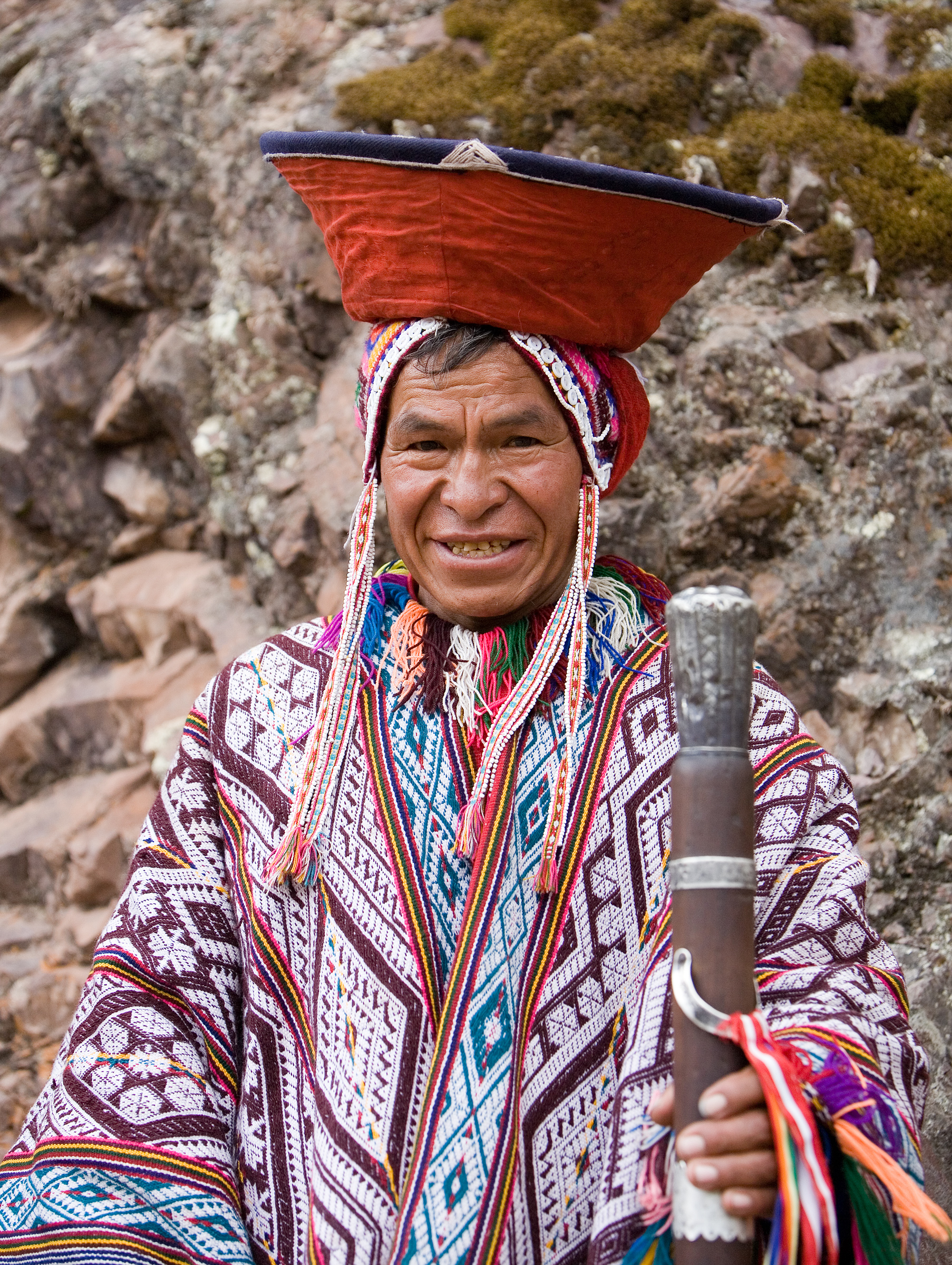
Indigenous man in Peru.

Although the Constitution delineates equality for race and ethnicity, the indigenous population within Peru is one of the most marginalized groups within the country. In 2014, the indigenous population constituted about 45% of the larger Peruvian population. Those who are indigenous speak Quechua, Aymara, or other indigenous languages. Within Peru, the "social pyramid" places Spanish-speaking European descendants on top, followed by mesitizos (speak mostly Spanish), cholos (Spanish-speaking indigenous), and lastly, monolingual indigenous speakers. As a result of the war against terrorism, numerous indigenous groups were uprooted, ostracized, and killed, removing them from Peruvian society.

All languages are recognized in Peru, but indigenous languages are understood as being of a lower status. Because Peru is largely a Spanish-speaking country, in order to be an advocate in society and participate, one must understand and speak Spanish. In terms of education, monolingual indigenous students struggle in Spanish-speaking teaching programs. Similarly, most of the indigenous population resides in rural areas, making access to resources a large problem for the individuals in those communities. Therefore, in Peru, the indigenous people are at a disadvantage when it comes to the labor force, education, and health access, placing them lower socially and economically in comparison to the larger population within Peru.

== See also ==
- Constitution of Peru
- Coordinadora Nacional de Derechos Humanos
- LGBT rights in Peru
- Capital punishment in Peru
- Human trafficking in Peru
- Women in Peru
- Indigenous peoples in Peru
