= Shimreingam Shaiza =

Indian Army officer

- Born: Shimreingam Shaiza
- Died: 29 August 1998; Imphal, Manipur, India
- Occupation: Indian Army officer
- Father: Shangyang Shaiza
- Relatives: Yangmaso Shaiza (brother); Hangmila Shaiza (sister in law)

Shimreingam Shaiza (died 29 August 1998) was an officer of the Indian Army from the Indian state of Manipur. He served as the first Indian Army officer among the Tangkhul Nagas. Shaiza was also known for his death in the 1998 Kwakeithel shooting incident in Imphal, which was later investigated as an extrajudicial killing.

== Early life and career ==
Shimreingam Shaiza was born to a Tangkhul Naga family. His father was Shangyang Shaiza served as the first President of Tangkhul Union Education, now known as the Tangkhul Naga Long, the apex tribal body of the Tangkhul Nagas.

His brother, Yangmaso Shaiza, served as the Chief Minister of Manipur twice, first from July to December 1974 and second from June 1977 until November 1979.

Shaiza was the first among the Tangkhul Nagas to serve as an officer in the Indian Army.

== Death ==
On 29 August 1998, Shaiza was killed in a shooting incident at Kwakeithel in Imphal when the car, a Maruti Esteem, he was travelling in was fired indiscriminately by Manipur Police commandos.

Initial reports described the incident as an encounter between security forces and suspected insurgents. However, subsequent accounts and investigations raised questions about the circumstances of the killing.

In later years, the case came under judicial scrutiny. In 2017, the Supreme Court of India directed the Central Bureau of Investigation (CBI) to examine a number of alleged extrajudicial killing cases in Manipur, including the death of Shaiza. Investigations later indicated that the incident may have been a staged encounter.

In 2025, a sessions court framed charges against four police personnel in connection with the case.

== Legacy ==
An award named after him, the Maj. Shimreingam Shaiza Award, has been given in recognition of academic achievement among students.

His death has also widely been referenced in discussions concerning extrajudicial killings in Manipur.

== See also ==
- Human rights abuses in Manipur
- Extrajudicial killings in India
