= Thenucho Tünyi =

Indian politician

Member of Nagaland Legislative Assembly
- In office 1982–1993
- Preceded by: Lhiweshelo Mero
- Succeeded by: Kewekhape Therie
- Constituency: Pfütsero

Speaker of Nagaland Legislative Assembly
- In office 1990–1993
- Preceded by: T. N. Ngullie
- Succeeded by: Neiba Ndang

Personal details
- Born: Thenucho Tünyi; 2 October 1952 (age 74) Kikrüma (present day Phek District, Nagaland, India)
- Party: United Naga Democratic Party; Naga People's Front
- Education: Government Law College, Bombay

Thenucho Tünyi (born 2 October 1952) is an Indian politician from Nagaland. He was elected to the Nagaland Legislative Assembly three times, representing Pfütsero Assembly constituency. Tünyi served as a member of the legislative assembly from 1982 to 1993.

== Early life ==
Thenucho Tünyi was born on 2 October 1952 to a Chakhesang Naga family from Kikrüma.

He attended Government Law College, Bombay in 1977.

== Political career ==
Tünyi was first elected to the Nagaland Legislative Assembly in 1982 on a Naga National Democratic Party ticket from Pfütsero constituency.

== Personal life ==
=== Attempted assassination ===
On 14 August 1991, twelve, including nine Nagaland Police personnel were killed and Tünyi sustained injuries in an ambush carried out by the NSCN-K at Lahorijan, near Dimapur, in the Karbi Anglong District of Assam. The convoy was en route to Mon to attend the Independence Day celebrations on 15 August where Tünyi was to grace the occasion as the Chief Guest.

=== 1998 Kwakeithel shooting ===
On 29 August 1998, Thenucho Tünyi was on his way to Imphal Airport to board a flight to New Delhi when the vehicle, a Maruti Esteem, in which he was travelling was fired upon by Manipur Police commandos at Kwakeithel Akham Leikai in Imphal. The shooting resulted in the deaths of four individuals inside the car: Maj. Shimreingam Shaiza, Nagaland Police personnel Tüsovehu Chakhesang and Kikheto Sema, driver Rükoshele and Hidam Budha Singh, a civilian working in his homestead land. Tünyi, the sole survivor, sustained multiple bullet injuries.

In 2025, four former Manipur Police commandos were charged in connection with the incident. The accused were identified as Thokchom Krishnatombi, who was serving as a Sub-Inspector at the time along with constables Khundongbam Inaobi, Thangkhongam Lungdim and Md. Akhtar Hussain.
