= 2004 Dimapur bombings =

Two coordinated attacks on public transport and market

- Location: Dimapur, Nagaland, India
- Date: 2 October 2004; 22 years ago 9:30 a.m. Indian Standard Time (UTC+05:30)
- Target: Dimapur Railway Station and Hong Kong Market
- Attack type: bombings
- Weapon: Improvised explosive devices
- Deaths: 30
- Injuries: ≈ 100
- Perpetrators: 11 people (Hukum Ali and 10 others)
- Motive: Separatism

The 2004 Dimapur bombings, were a series of two coordinated attacks carried out by terrorists on the morning of Saturday, 2 October 2004 in Dimapur that targeted passengers at the Dimapur Railway Station and shoppers at the Hong Kong Market during the morning rush hour. The attack killed 30 people and about 100 others were injured.

The attacks occurred simultaneously at around 09:30. One attack was at the Dimapur Railway Station, significantly damaging the platform at its surroundings, and the other at the Hong Kong Market. To date, it remains the deadliest terrorist incident to occur in Nagaland.

== Attacks ==
At 09:30 on 2 October 2004, two bombs were detonated almost simultaneously at the Dimapur Railway Station and the Hong Kong Market.

The bomb at the station was reportedly planted in the station manager's room. The blast was so powerful that the entire platform of the station was blown off.

In the aftermath all the trains en route between Guwahati and Dibrugarh passing through Dimapur were suspended.

=== Victims ===
Officials reported that 15 were killed at the railway station, 10 at the Hong Kong Market and 5 others succumbed to their injuries at the Dimapur Civil Hospital.

== Investigation ==
A Special Investigation Team (SIT), led by the State IGP (Crime) and comprising nine senior officers was initially formed but failed to make progress and the case was closed. The case was reopened on 3 August and 6 September 2010 by the then OC of Dimapur East Police Station.

On 17 August 2010, Dimapur Police arrested Mangal Mahato at a liquor joint in Dimapur's Super Market, who claimed to know those involved. Mahato revealed he overheard conversations in Central Jail, Chümoukedima (then Central Jail, Dimapur) during a four-month imprisonment for an auto rickshaw theft. He stated the blasts were carried out by ten convicts serving life sentences there since 2005.

Mahato disclosed that one Hukum Ali and his gang were arguing inside the prison about a promised ₹10 lakh payment from Abas Ali for executing the bombings. During remand, Hukum Ali confessed that Abas Ali and two unidentified Kachari accomplices hired them and handed over the bombs at Dimapur's Railgate and instructed them to plant them, one at the railway station and the other at Hong Kong Market.

Each gang member was promised ₹1 lakh, with an advance of ₹1 lakh given to Hukum Ali. However, the full promised amount of ₹10 lakh was never paid by Abas Ali and his Kachari associates.

== Perpetrators ==
On 20 September 2010, a joint interrogation by the Assam Rifles, SIB, CRPF, Special Branch and Dimapur Police examined Abdul Kalam, Babul Hussain, Haizul Ali, and Shajan Ali. Babul Hussain admitted to planting the bomb at Hong Kong market on orders from Hukum Ali, in the presence of Panas Ali, the late Nazim Uddin, Nur Jamal and Haizul Ali.

The nine accused ultimately charge-sheeted were Abdul Kalam, Haizul Ali, Shajan Ali, Panas Ali, Kudus Ali, Nur Jamal, Sahab Uddin, Babul Hussain and Hukum Ali

Abas Ali and his two Kachari accomplices remained at large.

One Nazim Uddin committed suicide in police custody on 9 September 2010 and the other Hukum Ali, the leader of the group who planted the bomb at the station, died in April 2014 of natural causes.

== See also ==
- 1996 Dimapur car bombing
- List of terrorist incidents
- Timeline of Naga history
