= 1996 Dimapur car bombing =

1996 assassination attempt in India

- Part of the Naga conflict
- Location: Ara Mile, Dimapur, Nagaland
- Date: 25 December 1996
- Target: Kihoto Hollohon
- Attack type: car bomb (remote)
- Deaths: 5

The 1996 Dimapur car bombing occurred on 25 December 1996, when the NSCN-IM detonated a powerful car bomb triggered from remote control in the Ara Mile neighbourhood of Dimapur, Nagaland in an attempted assassination on Kihoto Hollohon, the then Minister of Industries & Commerce of Nagaland. Hollohon escaped as he was not in the vehicle. The blast killed his wife, daughter, granddaughter, grandson and one other on the spot.

== Incident ==
On 25 December 1996, the NSCN-IM triggered a car bomb from remote control in an assassination attempt on Hollohon and his family while they were returning home from a Christmas service in the Ara Mile neighbourhood of Dimapur.

Hollohon escaped as he was not in the vehicle at that time. The vehicle, a Maruti Suzuki Gypsy, in which his wife Vitoli, daughter Nishela, grand-daughter Hollotoli and grand-son Ninoto (2 year old) and one other were seated exploded killing everyone on the spot.

== See also ==
- 2004 Dimapur bombings
- 1991 Lahorijan ambush
- 2019 Khonsa ambush
