= List of massacres in Nagaland =

The following is a list of massacres that have occurred in Nagaland.

== Before Statehood (prior to 1963) ==
Name	Date	Location	Deaths	Notes
Yengpang Massacre	15 November 1954	Yengpang village	60 civilians	Committed by Indian army soldiers.
Matikhrü Massacre	6 September 1960	Matikhrü, Phek District	9 civilians	Committed by 16th Punjab Regiment

== After Nagaland Statehood (since 1963) ==
Name	Date	Location	Deaths	Notes
Mokokchung Massacre	27 December 1994	Mokokchung	12 civilians	Committed by 16th Maratha Light Infantry and 10th Assam Rifles
Kohima Massacre	5 March 1995	Kohima	7 civilians	Committed by the 16th Rashtriya Rifles
Oting Massacre	4 December 2021	Yatong–Langkhao, Oting, Mon District	13 civilians	Committed by 21st Para Special Forces and Assam Rifles

== Incidents attributed to Naga insurgent groups ==
Naga insurgent factions, primarily various groups under the National Socialist Council of Nagaland (NSCN), have been responsible for numerous killings, massacres, and atrocities against civilians, rival factions, political workers, and alleged informers during the Naga insurgency.

Name / Incident	Date	Location	Deaths	Notes
Naga raids on Assam villages	January 1979	Border villages in Assam	~50+	Naga tribal raiders from Nagaland attacked multiple villages in neighboring Assam.
Killing of civilians (various NSCN factions)	1990s–2010s	Various locations in Nagaland & Manipur	Dozens	Multiple incidents of civilians killed as alleged informers or in factional clashes between NSCN-IM and NSCN-K.
Assassination of political figures and civilians	Ongoing	Nagaland	Varied	NSCN groups have been accused of extortion, kidnapping, and targeted killings of those opposing them.

== Concerns regarding scope and sourcing ==
The article has been criticized for presenting an incomplete picture of violence in Nagaland. While titled as a general list of massacres, the included incidents are predominantly those attributed to Indian security forces, with limited coverage of atrocities committed by Naga insurgent groups such as the National Socialist Council of Nagaland (NSCN) factions and inter-tribal violence.

Critics argue this selective scope may give a biased view of the Naga conflict, which has involved violence from multiple parties including state forces, insurgents, and factional clashes.

=== Sourcing issues ===
Sources for older incidents often rely on local newspapers, memorials, and personal accounts, which are valuable but generally considered less reliable for contentious historical claims compared to academic studies, government inquiries, or reports from multiple independent outlets. More recent entries tend to have stronger corroboration from national and international media.

== See also ==
- Ethnic conflict in Nagaland
