= South East Asia Court of Women on HIV and Human Trafficking =

2009 conference on South East Asian women's issues

The South East Asia Court of Women on HIV and Human Trafficking was a conference held on 6 August 2009 in Nusa Dua, Bali, Indonesia, organised by the United Nations Development Programme (UNDP) and other regional bodies. A report was subsequently published, drawing attention to the issues of human immunodeficiency virus (HIV) and human trafficking among women in South-East Asia.

== Co-sponsors ==
As well as the UNDP the event was sponsored by: Asian Women's Human Rights Council (AWHRC); the Indonesian NGO, Yakeba; United Nations Office on Drugs and Crime (UNODC); United Nations Development Fund for Women (UNIFEM); United Nations Inter-Agency Project on Human Trafficking (UNIAP); and Asia Pacific Network of people living with HIV (APN +), with financial support from the Japanese Government. The event was arranged in coordination with the 9th International Congress on AIDS in Asia and the Pacific (ICAAP), which opened on 9 August, also on Bali.

== Structure ==
The event took the form of a "symbolic court", in which a panel ("jury") of six experts in the field of legal and human rights heard first-hand testimonies from 22 South-East Asian women who described how they had undergone trafficking, violence and exploitation. There were also presentations of data and analysis on the extent of violation of dignity and human rights experienced by South East Asian women. Those attending included political leaders as well as individuals and groups working to empower women and reduce their vulnerability to trafficking and HIV in the region. Sessions included: human rights of vulnerable communities; public health impact of anti-trafficking legislation; and responses from communities.

== Conclusion ==
Following the proceedings the Jury issued a statement to the effect that "the vulnerabilities of women to trafficking and HIV are rooted in the disproportionate human insecurity, poverty, illiteracy and disempowerment that they face in their daily lives". They added that some women who are trafficked are treated as illegal migrants, prosecuted as criminals, or denied their rights.

The event resulted in a report, "The South-East Asia Court of Women on HIV and Human Trafficking: From Vulnerability to Free, Just, and Safe Movement", published by the UNDP the following January, with the aim of promoting further discussion and action on issues relating to HIV and human trafficking among women in South-East Asia.

== See also ==
- Human rights issues in Northeast India
- Breakthrough (human rights)
