= 1994 Mokokchung Massacre =

1994 massacre in Nagaland, India

- Part of Naga conflict
- A victim being nursed by Red Cross volunteers
- Location: Mokokchung, Nagaland
- Date: 27 December 1994; 10:20 a.m. to 12:30 p.m. (IST)
- Target: Civilians
- Attack type: Massacre
- Deaths: 12
- Perpetrators: Indian Army •10th Assam Rifles •16th Maratha Light Infantry

The 1994 Mokokchung Massacre also referred to as Ayatai Mokokchung by the citizens of the town, took place on 27 December 1994, when forces of the 10th Assam Rifles and the 12th Maratha Light Infantry of the Indian Army raided upon civilian populace of Nagaland's Mokokchung.

The incident lasted for about 2 hours and left 89 shops, 48 houses, 17 vehicles and 7 two-wheelers razed to ashes, excluding those destroyed by gunfire and shelling. 7 civilians were gunned down, another 5 burned alive including a child, several women raped and more than a dozen gone missing.

== Incident ==
On 27 December 1994 at around 10:20 a.m., a patrol of the 16th Maratha Light Infantry (MLI) was moving near the Police Point in Mokokchung, Nagaland. According to MLI sources, the troops were fired upon by armed insurgents which led to the death of one MLI soldier.

The MLI reacted by firing and then dousing woollen balls and other inflammable materials with fuel and started setting shops, houses and other buildings on fire.

As the shooting intensifies, the military cordoned off the civilians who were in and around the main shopping area of the town. The women and children were then made to crawl towards the open space of the Main Traffic Island whereas men were systematically tortured.

== Investigation ==
According to reports, in order to create a fear psychosis among the people, the event was systematically premeditated to prevent any mishap to Indian Army Chief Shankar Roychowdhury as he was visiting Kohima that same day to "discuss the Law and Order problem in Nagaland" with the then Chief Minister of Nagaland, S. C. Jamir. Also earlier that day starting from around 7:00 a.m. all telephone lines in the town were mysteriously out of service which led to the apprehension that the incident was planned beforehand.

== Legacy ==
In January 2020, a number of Naga civil societies and various individuals showed their resentment against the construction of a War Memorial in Mokokchung by the Assam Rifles, one of the perpetrators of the infamous incident in the heart of the town.

== Gallery ==
A building brought down to the ground by a mortar

Vehicles and buildings razed down to ashes

== See also ==
- List of massacres in Nagaland
- List of massacres in India
