= Matikhrü =

- Village
- Location of Matikhrü
- Coordinates: 25.595668°N 94.580150°E
- Country: India
- Region: Northeast India
- State: Nagaland
- District: Meluri District

Population (2011)
  - Total: 1,196
  - Dialect: Pochuri
- Time zone: UTC+5:30 (IST)
- PIN: 797114
- Vehicle registration: NL-08
- Sex ratio: 951 ♂/♀
- Website: nagaland.nic.in

Matikhrü is a Pochury Naga village located in Meluri District of Nagaland.

== History ==
=== Matikhrü Massacre ===
On 6 September 1960, forces of the 16th Punjab Regiment of the Indian Army occupied Matikhrü and carried out the systematic and brutal Matikhrü massacre. The armed troops later completely destroyed the village and the survivors were left to wander in the wilderness for almost three years. Matikhrü was then re-established in 1963.

== Demographics ==
Matikhrü is situated in Meluri circle of Phek District in Nagaland. As per the Population Census 2011, there are total 246 families residing in Matikhrü. The total population of Matikhrü is 1196.

== See also ==
- List of villages in Nagaland
