= Naga Home Guards =

The term "Naga Home Guard" has been used to describe two distinct organizations in Nagaland, India, during different historical periods.

== Naga Home Guard (1958–1963) ==
In the late 1950s, amidst escalating tensions between Naga nationalist movements and the Indian government, the Naga National Council (NNC) recognized the need for an organized military force. On March 22, 1956, they established the Naga Safe Guard (NSG), with General Thongdi Chang serving as its first chief. In 1958, the NSG was restructured and renamed the Naga Home Guard (NHG), under the leadership of General Kaito Sukhai. The NHG aimed to defend Naga territories and assert the region's quest for self-determination. As the movement intensified, the NHG evolved into a more structured military entity, leading to the formation of the Naga Army on January 3, 1963, with General Mowu Angami as its chief.

== Nagaland Home Guards (Established 1988) ==
In a separate development, the Government of Nagaland, inspired by the erstwhile separatist Naga Home Guard, established the Department of Civil Defence in 1982 to enhance the state's internal security and disaster response capabilities. This department was restructured and, on March 1, 1988, became the Nagaland Home Guards, following the enactment of the Nagaland Home Guards Ordinance in 1987. The Nagaland Home Guards Act was subsequently passed by the State Legislative Assembly on May 12, 1988. This organization serves as a voluntary force tasked with augmenting and assisting the civil police in maintaining law and order, regulating traffic, and providing support during elections and disasters. Recognizing the complementary roles of civil defence and home guards, the department was re-designated as the Department of Home Guards and Civil Defence on June 6, 1998. With the establishment of the Nagaland State Disaster Management Authority (NSDMA) in 2012, the department expanded its focus to include disaster management activities. Consequently, on August 20, 2020, it was re-designated as the Department of Home Guards, Civil Defence, and State Disaster Response Force (SDRF).

The Central Training Institute, located in Toluvi, Dimapur, serves as the backbone of this department, conducting basic and specialized training for Home Guards, Civil Defence, and SDRF personnel, as well as various stakeholders involved in disaster management.
