= Human rights issues in Northeast India =

Sushanta Chowdhury (Minister of Tripura)

Northeast India
- Location of Northeast states within India
- Population: 38,857,769
- Area: 262,230 km^{2} (101,250 sq mi)
- Population density: 148/km^{2} (380/sq mi)
- Time zone: IST (UTC+5:30)
- States and territories: Arunachal Pradesh, Assam, Manipur, Meghalaya, Mizoram, Nagaland, Sikkim, Tripura
- Largest cities (2008): Guwahati, Dimapur, Agartala, Shillong, Aizawl,
- Official languages: Assamese, Bengali, Bodo, English, Garo, Khasi, Kokborok, Meitei, Mizo, Nepali, Pnar, Sikkimese
- Religion: Christianity, Buddhism, Hinduism, Islam

Human rights issues in northeast India have been widely reported in the press and by human rights activists. Northeast India refers to the north-easternmost region of India consisting of the states of Arunachal Pradesh, Assam, Manipur, Meghalaya, Mizoram, Nagaland, Sikkim, and Tripura, as well as parts of northern West Bengal (districts of Darjeeling, Jalpaiguri, and Koch Bihar).

== Background ==
An ongoing separatist struggle has continued in the region since the late 1940s, making it the longest running separatist struggle in South Asia. There are multiple parties involved in the struggles including different ethnic groups and states, some of whom want total independence from India while others call for a restructuring of the states.

There are existing territorial conflicts within the Northeastern states, including Manipur and Nagaland, Nagaland and Assam, Meghalaya and Assam, and Mizoram and Assam. These are often based on historical border disputes and differing ethnic, tribal or cultural affinities. There has been a number of insurgent activities and regional movements in all parts of the northeast, often unique in character to each state. Military action by the armed and paramilitary forces and political action have led to the intensity of these insurgencies fluctuating and to the resolution of the insurgency in Mizoram.

Human rights abuses on the part of Indian forces in the area are frequently traced to immunity granted to Indian security forces under the Armed Forces (Special Powers) Act, 1958. The act has been criticized by Human Rights Watch as a "tool of state abuse, oppression and discrimination".

The South Asian Human Rights Documentation Centre argues that the governments' call for increased force is part of the problem.

"This reasoning exemplifies the vicious cycle which has been instituted in the North East due to the AFSPA. The use of the AFSPA pushes the demand for more autonomy, giving the people of the North East more reason to want to secede from a state which enacts such powers and the agitation which ensues continues to justify the use of the AFSPA from the point of view of the Indian Government."

A report by the Institute for Defense Studies and Analysis points to multiple occurrences of violence by security forces against civilians in Manipur since the passage of the Act. The report states that residents believe that the provision for immunity of security forces urge them to act more brutally.

== Examples ==
Violence broke out between Bodo tribes and Bengali-speaking Muslim migrant settlers in the Kokrajhar district of Assam on 20 July 2012, leaving at least 40-45 people dead and approximately 1,70,000 displaced in the month of July. According to Human Rights Watch, the fighting has led to a strict curfew, with police being given "shoot at sight" orders for curfew violators. Multiple police shootings were reported after the order was given.

== Allegations of sexual assault ==
Women are mostly raped or sexually assaulted during military crackdowns where men of the villages or towns are gathered outside their homes and women are forced to stay indoors. Furthermore, most of the raped go unreported due to the social stigma and fear of backlash.

== See also ==
- Insurgency in North East India
