= Merapani =

Assamese border town

Merapani is a town and a subdivision of Golaghat district in the state of Assam and Nagaland. Half of Merapani lies in the Wokha district of Nagaland and half lies in Golaghat District of Assam. There is a Border Magistrate Office in Merapani, Wokha. The Nagaland Seed Farm is also in Merapani. The dominant tribe of Merapani are the Lotha Naga.There are many Gorkhas family living in Merapani. Since 2000s many Bangladeshi illegal immigrants has settled in Merapani thereby changing the whole social structure of the town. Politically, Merapani falls under 40th Bhandari Assembly Constituency of Nagaland. In almost all General Elections, Merapani has been the bellwether town of 40th Bhandari Assembly constituency and has voted for the winning candidate in every Election. Achumbemo Kikon of NPF is present MLA.

The nearest Railway station is Furkating Junction railway station. The nearest airport is Jorhat Airport which is 65 km away.

== Geography ==
Merapani is located at 26.3224975°N 94.0842533°E.

== Notable people ==
- Nanda Kirati Dewan, Indian Gorkha leader
