= Assam Forest Department =

Governmental department of Assam

The Department of Environment and Forests, Government of Assam is a department under the Government of Assam.

== See also ==
- Van Vigyan Kendra (VVK) Forest Science Centres
- Indian Council of Forestry Research and Education
