= Manipur Police =

Police Service of Manipur

Manipur Police ꯃꯅꯤꯄꯨꯔ ꯄꯨꯂꯤꯁ
- Manipur Police Insignia

Jurisdictional structure
- Operations jurisdiction: Manipur, India
- Map of Manipur Police's jurisdiction
- Legal jurisdiction: State of Manipur
- General nature: Civilian police

Operational structure
- Overseen by: Home Office, Government of Manipur
- Headquarters: State Police Headquarters
- Agency executive: Mukesh Singh IPS, Director General of Police-Manipur State (DGP)
- Parent agency: Home Office, Ministry of Home Affairs, Government of Manipur

Website
- www.manipurpolice.gov.in

The Manipur Police is the law enforcement agency for the state of Manipur in India.

== Organizational structure ==
Manipur Police comes under direct control of Department of Home Affairs, Government of Manipur. The Manipur Police is headed by Director General of Police (DGP) Mukesh Singh.

== Organisation ==
The Manipur Police has nine operational groups under the three main departments.

- Crime branch
- Training
- Traffic Police

== Police ranks ==
The Manipur Police maintains the following ranks:

1. Director General of Police
2. Additional Director General of Police
3. Inspector General of Police
4. Deputy Inspector General of Police
5. Superintendent of Police
6. Additional Superintendent of Police
7. Deputy Superintendent of Police
8. Police Inspector
9. Police Sub Inspector
10. Assistant Police Sub Inspector
11. Head Constable
12. Police constable

PPDSD

== Insignia of Manipur Police (State Police) ==
State Police Services rank insignia
Insignia

Rank

Superintendent of police (Note: In an armed police battalion, the equivalent rank is "Commandant.)
Additional superintendent of police (Note: In an armed police battalion, the equivalent rank is Deputy Commandant)
Deputy superintendent of police (Note: In an armed police battalion, the equivalent rank is Assistant Commandant.)

Abbreviation

SP
Addl.SP
DSP/Dy.SP

- Note: Gazetted officers in State Police Services (SPS) begins from DSP and above.
- In the Indian Police Service (IPS), rank starts from Assistant Superintendent of Police (ASP), which is equivalent to DSP in state services.
