= Nagaland Police =

Indian state police agency

- Motto: Security, Service, Sacrifice

Jurisdictional structure
- Operations jurisdiction: Nagaland, India
- Map of Nagaland Police's jurisdiction
- Area: 16,579 km^{2} (6,401 sq mi)
- Population: 1.9 million
- Governing body: Nagaland Home Department
- General nature: Civilian police

Operational structure
- Headquarters: Nagaland Police Headquarters, Police Reserve Hill, Kohima, Nagaland
- Sworn members: 28,113
- Director General of Police responsible: Rupin Sharma, IPS

Facilities
- Stations: 88

Website
- Nagaland Police

Nagaland Police is the law enforcement agency for the Indian state of Nagaland. The headquarters of the Nagaland Police is located in Police Reserve Hill, Kohima. It is headed by a Director General of Police (DGP).

== Organisational structure ==
Nagaland Police comes under the direct control of the Department of Home Affairs, Government of Nagaland. As of August 2025, Rupin Sharma, IPS, is the DGP, having assumed charge in January 2023.

The organisational structure of the Nagaland Police includes:

- NAP (Nagaland Armed Police) Battalions
- District Executive Force (DEF)
- Nagaland Police Telecommunication Org. (NPTO)
- Nagaland Armed Police Training Centre (NAPTC)
- Police Training School (PTS)
- Intelligence Branch
- Crime Branch (In the Police Headquarters and in every district)
- Forensic Science Laboratory (FSL)

== Notable Officers ==
Dr. Pritpal Kaur, IPS
